= Demographics of the United Kingdom =

- Population pyramid in 2021
- Population: ▲69,483,939 (2025)
- Density: 287/km^{2} (740/sq mi) (2025)
- Growth rate: ▲0.85% (2022)
- Birth rate: ▲10.3/1,000 population (2021)
- Death rate: ▼10.0/1,000 population (2021)
- Life expectancy
  - male: ▼78.6 years of age (2020–2022)
  - female: ▼82.6 years of age (2020–2022)
- Fertility rate: ▼1.53 (2021)
- Infant mortality: ▲4.0 deaths/1,000 live births (2021)
- Net migration rate: ▼2.9 migrants/1,000 population (2024 est.)
- Immigrant share: 17.1% (2024)

Age structure
- 0–14 years: 17.2% (2022)
- 15–64 years: 64.0% (2022)
- 65 and over: 18.8% (2022)

Sex ratio
- Total: 0.99 male(s)/female (2024 est.)
- At birth: 1.05 male(s)/female (2024 est.)
- Under 15: 1.05 male(s)/female (2024 est.)
- 15–64 years: 1.02 male(s)/female (2024 est.)
- 65 and over: 0.85 male(s)/female (2024 est.)

Nationality
- Nationality: British citizen
- Major ethnic: ▼ White (83.05%) (Note: Scotland held its census a year later after England, Wales and Northern Ireland due to the COVID-19 pandemic. As a result, the data shown is from two separate years.); British or Irish (76.80%); Romani (0.15%); Gypsy or Irish Traveller (0.11%); Other White (5.99%); Polish (1.26%); Romanian (0.83%); Italian (0.44%); German (0.43%); Other (3.03%)
- Minor ethnic: ▲ Asian (8.60%); Indian (2.88%); Pakistani (2.48%); Bangladeshi (0.97%); Chinese (0.75%); Other (1.52%); ▲ Black (3.71%); Black Caribbean (0.94%); Nigerian (0.44%); Somalis (0.31%); Other (2.02%); ▲ Multiracial (2.68%); Mixed White-Asian (0.73%); Mixed White-Black (0.37%); Other (1.58%); ▲ Other (1.96%)

Language
- Official: English
- Spoken: Scots · Irish · Scottish Gaelic · Welsh · Cornish

The population of the United Kingdom was estimated at 69.5 million in 2025. It is the 21st most populated country in the world and has a population density of 287 people per square kilometre (740 people/mi^{2}), with England having significantly greater density than Wales, Scotland, and Northern Ireland. Almost a third of the population lives in south east England, which is predominantly urban and suburban, with 9,122,909 people in the capital city, London, whose population density was 5,804 inhabitants per square kilometre (15,030/sq mi) in 2025.

The population of the UK has undergone demographic transition— from a typically pre-industrial population, with high birth and mortality rates and slow population growth, through a stage of falling mortality and faster rates of population growth, to a stage of low birth and mortality rates with, again, lower rates of growth. This growth through "natural change" has been accompanied since the 1990s by growth through net immigration into the United Kingdom, which since 1999 has exceeded natural change.

The United Kingdom's high literacy rate of 99% at age 15 and above, is attributable to universal state education, introduced at the primary level in 1870 (Scotland 1872, free 1890) and at the secondary level in 1900. Parents are obliged to have their children educated from the ages of 5 to 16 years. In England, 16–17-year olds should remain in education, employment or training in the form of A-Levels, vocational training, and apprenticeships, until the age of 18.

The United Kingdom's population is predominantly White British (75.98% at the 2021 Census), but due to migration mostly from Commonwealth nations, Britain has become ethnically diverse. The second and third largest non-white racial groups are Asian British at 8.6% of the population, followed by Black British people at 3.71%.

The main language of the United Kingdom is British English. Scots is widely spoken in many parts of Scotland, as is Scottish Gaelic, a Celtic language. Cornish and Irish have been revived to a limited degree in Cornwall and Northern Ireland, but the predominant language in all these areas is English. Welsh is widely spoken as a first language in parts of North and West Wales, and to lesser extent in South East Wales, where English is the dominant first language.

== Background ==
At the end of the 4th century, Roman Britain had an estimated population of 3.6 million but even after a period of significant Anglo-Saxon settlement the overall population is believed to have fallen precipitously due to political upheavals and plagues.

=== England before the Union ===
The compilation of the Domesday Book in the 11th century did not count the population but it has been regarded as one of the first attempts to produce a census of the country. There may have been between 1.25 and 2 million people living in England at that time.

Between 1086 and 1750, the English population fluctuated in size due to civil war, famines and plagues. By the end of the 13th century, the population is estimated to have reached between four and six million people. A combination of factors such as widespread famine and disease in the following century reduced the population dramatically. An agricultural crisis in 1315 to 1322 and the Black Death in 1348 to 1350 reduced the population by over a third. In 1377, the population is estimated based on a poll tax on all people aged 14 and over, depending on the numbers under 14, to be around 2.2 million to 3.1 million.

Periods of instability over the 15th century, such as the Wars of the Roses, caused the population to increase at a slower pace. The general factors behind this were a high mortality rate due to war, fewer marriages within the population, late marriages (keeping fertility levels low) and a net emigration of English people out of the country. By the 16th century, the situation had changed due to political stability under the Tudor monarchy and less civil unrest, which would have resulted in a higher mortality rate. While this was overturned with the English Civil War in 17th century, it allowed the population to grow at a faster pace, causing the population of England to reach a total of 5.74 million by 1750.

=== Scotland before the Union ===
Population growth in Scotland was generally slower than south of the border, resulting in the total being significantly lower in the late 17th and early 18th centuries. This is often ascribed to similar factors halting it such as a high mortality rate, especially for infants, and later marriage and childbearing patterns. Ireland before the 19th century consistently had rapid population growth, which has been ascribed to higher fertility rates and earlier age of marriage than in England. The Plantation of Ulster in the 17th century also affected the population of Scotland, with an estimated 100,000 Scots migrating to Ulster. The Jacobite rebellion in 1745 also caused significant emigration. The estimated population total of Scotland in 1691 was 1.23 million.

== History ==
=== First census and the demographic transition, 1800–2000 ===
The impetus to collect population data was reinforced due to food supply concerns and war against France in the late 18th century and the beginning of the early 19th century. In 1800, the Census Act was passed, authorising the first modern census in British history to be conducted.

Population growth in England and then the UK since 1800

The first Census in 1801 revealed that the population of Great Britain was 10.5 million. England's population was 8.3 million, Wales' population was 0.6 million, and Scotland had a population of 1.6 million. In Ireland, the population was between 4.5 and 5.5 million inhabitants. Since 1801, a census has been conducted almost every decade. In Ireland, it was conducted for the first time in 1821.

During the Industrial Revolution, the demographic transition started in the United Kingdom, going from a pre-industrial society demographically to an industrialised society. At the 1841 Census, the population of England and Wales was 15.9 million, having doubled in the space of 40 years. Ireland had 8.2 million and Scotland had 2.6 million. The slightly lower rate of growth for Scotland may be attributed to higher net emigration of Scottish people out of the nation, and two typhus epidemics in 1837 and 1847.

Factors often associated with the beginning of the demographic transition began to change dramatically as well, which contributed to the rapid increase. For example, child mortality decreased dramatically: the proportion of children born in London who died before the age of five decreased from 74.5% in 1730–1749, to 31.8% in 1810–1829. General mortality was thought to have declined as well, especially after 1850. This, as well as an increased birth rate, caused the English population to sustain itself in the second phase of the transition from 1750 to 1870.

In the second half of the 19th century the population of England continued to grow quickly, from 16.8 million in 1851 to 30.5 million in 1901. Similar rapid growth was seen in other countries of the UK. In Wales, the population increased from 0.6 million in 1801, to 2 million in 1901. In Scotland, the population increased from 1.6 million in 1801, to 4.5 million in 1901. In contrast, the Great Irish Famine, which began in the 1840s, caused the deaths of 1 million Irish people, and caused well over a million to emigrate.

Mass emigration became entrenched as a result of the famine, and Ireland's population decreased rapidly, from 8.2 million in 1841 to 3.2 million in 1901. This massive population collapse did not affect Northern Ireland to the same extent, as it was more industrialised and urbanised. While the Northern Ireland population declined, it recovered by the beginning of the 20th century. This prolonged period of emigration and net population decline in Irish history was not reversed until the middle of the 20th century.

The total fertility rate of the UK population declined from 4.88 children per woman in 1871, to 2.4 by 1921, representing a transition to the third stage of the demographic transition. Traditional means of birth control, such as abstinence and withdrawal, facilitated the collapse of the birth rate. By the 1930s, this was hastened by more modern methods of contraception, which were beginning to gain increased acceptance. From 1840 to 1930 there was a net emigration of English people out of the country, which scaled back population growth.

During the first half of the 20th century, the United Kingdom began to approach the fourth stage of the demographic transition. The deaths of troops in the First World War, coupled with the 1918 influenza outbreak, are estimated to have totalled over 900,000 deaths in the United Kingdom. This reduced the male population of the Lost Generation and altered the sex ratio, which slowed the growth rate of the population. By the end of the Second World War, the fourth stage transition was completed. There was a low but fluctuating birth rate, a low death rate and a slower population growth rate. The British Nationality Act 1948 allowed many people from the British Empire's colonies to migrate to the country, being classed in nationality as the same as a native of the United Kingdom. This law, while an unintentional side-effect, led to the start of modern immigration to the United Kingdom.

In the 1960s, there was also major social change in the United Kingdom. Liberalisation of society led to the Abortion Act 1967, which legalised abortion in the United Kingdom for the first time, and the Divorce Reform Act 1969, which made divorce easier. Between these years, the population fluctuated: from the 1950s onwards the population increased through natural growth. By the mid-1970s, the population decreased due to emigration, which took net migration to a negative, and deaths exceeded births. For the first time in 1973, the birth rate of the country fell below replacement level. By the 1980s, the decline of population growth had recovered to an extent due to a reversal of net emigration.

In the 1990s, international migration began to contribute more to population growth. In 1998, this overtook natural increase as the main cause of growth. Liberalisation of immigration rules under the Blair government allowed a rapid increase of the number of migrants arriving, quadrupling the number from a net migration rate of 50,000 a year, to 200,000 a year.

=== Modern century, 2000–present ===
By the beginning of the 21st century, the population of the United Kingdom was 59,113,000 people. In each constituent nation, the population of England was 49,449,700, Scotland had a population of 5,064,200, Wales had a population of 2,910,200 and Northern Ireland a population of 1,689,300. The rapid increase in international migration at the end of the 20th century brought greater heterogenisation to the British population in ethnicity, race and country of birth.

In 2001, the White British population was registered to be 88.52% of the total population. In 2011, this proportion of the population had dropped to 81.88%. Other ethnic groups rose by 50% of their respective total population in 2001, or doubled entirely.

Such rapid immigration growth boosted population growth in the United Kingdom. In 2011, the population was around 63 million people.

== Population ==
The population of the UK in the last recorded census in 2011 was 63 million, of whom 31 million were male and 32 million female. The 2011 census recorded the population of England as 53.0 million, Scotland as 5.3 million, Wales as 3.1 million, and Northern Ireland as 1.8 million. At the last recorded population estimate, it was estimated that the UK population was at a total of 67,081,234 people.

There are 13 urban areas that exceed 500,000 inhabitants: they are centred on London, Birmingham, Glasgow, Leeds and Bradford, Southampton and Portsmouth, Sheffield, Liverpool, Leicester, Manchester, Belfast, Bristol, Newcastle-upon-Tyne and Nottingham.

(Note: Crude migration change (per 1000) is a trend analysis, an extrapolation based average population change (current year minus previous) minus natural change of the current year (see table vital statistics). As average population is an estimate of the population in the middle of the year and not end of the year.)

The total number of registered deaths, 1838 to 2018

=== Population by country ===
Population distribution across the UK
Constituent country	Population (mid-2025)		Area		Population density per km^{2} (per mi^{2})
Constituent country	Numbers	% of UK	km^{2} (mi^{2})	% of UK	Population density per km^{2} (per mi^{2})
England	58,834,800	84.6%	130,309 (50,313)	53.7%	434 (1,124)
Scotland	5,545,500	8.0%	77,911 (30,082)	32.1%	70 (181)
Wales	3,175,200	4.6%	20,736 (8,006)	8.5%	153 (396)
Northern Ireland	1,931,300	2.8%	13,793 (5,326)	5.7%	137 (355)
United Kingdom	69,487,000	100%	242,749 (93,726)	100%	274 (710)

Population of individual countries over time

England

Scotland

Wales

Northern Ireland

=== Population change over time ===
Population change in England, Wales and Northern Ireland from 2011 to 2021 and 2011 to 2022 in Scotland More than −3% –0 – 3% +0 – 5% +5 – 10% More than +10%

The following table shows the total UK population estimated at census dates. Pre 1901 figures include the whole of Ireland, whereas from 1901 onwards only the population of Northern Ireland is included.

United Kingdom population at census dates
Intercensal period	Population at start of period	Average annual numbers of					Population density at start of period (per km^{2})
Intercensal period	Population at start of period	Overall change	Births	Deaths	Net natural change	Net migration etc.	Population density at start of period (per km^{2})
1851–1861	27,368,800	154,910	Unknown	Unknown	Unknown	Unknown	87
1861–1871	28,917,900	256,680	Unknown	Unknown	Unknown	Unknown	92
1871–1881	31,484,700	344,980	Unknown	Unknown	Unknown	Unknown	100
1881–1891	34,934,500	286,790	Unknown	Unknown	Unknown	Unknown	111
1891–1901	37,802,400	373,580	Unknown	Unknown	Unknown	Unknown	120
1901–1911	38,237,000	385,000	1,091,000	624,000	467,000	−82,000	156
1911–1921	42,082,000	195,000	975,000	689,000	286,000	−92,000	172
1921–1931	44,027,000	201,000	824,000	555,000	268,000	−67,000	180
1931–1951	46,038,000	213,000	793,000	603,000	190,000	22,000	188
1951–1961	50,225,000	258,000	839,000	593,000	246,000	12,000	205
1961–1971	52,807,000	312,000	962,000	638,000	324,000	−12,000	216
1971–1981	55,928,000	42,000	736,000	666,000	69,000	−27,000	229
1981–1991	56,357,000	108,000	757,000	655,000	103,000	5,000	231
1991–2001	57,439,000	161,000	731,000	631,000	100,000	61,000	235
2001–2011	59,113,000	324,000	722,000	588,000	134,000	191,000	242
2011–2021	63,285,100	370,000	755,000	605,000	150,000	220,000	259
2021–2031	67,026,300	—N/a	—N/a	—N/a	—N/a	—N/a	274

Population density calculated on:

- Pre–1901: 243,820 km^{2} total land area for the current United Kingdom plus 70,273 km^{2} land area of the current Republic of Ireland.
- Post–1901: its current boundaries.

==== Future projections ====
Population projections from the UN for the United Kingdom to 2100

The UK government first began publishing population projections for the country in the 1920s under the Government Actuary's Department (GAD) which were mainly produced to be used for long-term financial estimates for pensions and other schemes of social insurance. However, since the Second World War, population projections have taken an expanded role in all areas of influencing government policy. The GAD produced population projections every year from 1955 to 1979 and then switched it to every 2 years up to 1991. The Office for National Statistics took control of producing population projections for the country in 2006.

The British Office for National Statistics' 2016-based National Population Projections indicated that, if recent trends continue, the UK's population would increase by 3.6 million between mid-2016 and mid-2026. This represents an average annual growth rate of 0.5%. Over the same period, the population of England is projected to grow by 5.9%; for Wales, this figure is 3.1%, while for Scotland and Northern Ireland the figures are 3.2% and 4.2% respectively. These projections did not allow for any possible effects of the UK leaving the European Union.

=== Fertility ===
Total fertility rate of the United Kingdom from 1541 to 2019

Total fertility rate of the United Kingdom across local authorities in 2021 1 to 1.4 1.4 to 1.7 1.7 to 1.9 1.9 to 2.1 2.1+

Since 1838 it has been compulsory to register a birth or death in the United Kingdom.

Official data on the fertility rate of the country was first made available in 1938, However, it is possible to estimate the total fertility rate (TFR) from 1541 onwards.

The fertility rate of the United Kingdom before the 19th century remained at around 5 children per woman. This rate has been falling since 1870, when the country began into transition into the third stage of the demographic transition. This transition represents the change in reproductive strategy from how many children a mother 'needs' to how many she 'wants', and a substitution of quality over quantity in the offspring produced. From the 1880s onwards, the birth rate began to decline rapidly from its previous levels. In England the rate declined by 44% between 1875 and 1920.

The decline has been attributed to a number of factors, including biological, technological, societal socio-economic reasons and cultural trends. The Industrial Revolution led to large scale movements of people to high density urban population centres; income per capita rose significantly especially in the last half of the 19th century, while economic growth improved the livelihoods of the working and middle classes. This growth in the standard of living led also reduced mortality rates (which had been in decline since the early 18th century) and especially in infant mortality. The decline of child labour at the same time meant there was less economic need for a large number of children. Educational standards improved during the same time period, which gave children more economical potential.

The increasing number of women in the workforce in the 19th century also contributed to the birth rate decline.

Improvements in nutrition, which are linked to biological factors such as a decline in lactation, have also been cited as a potential factor in the decline of the fertility rate. Technological developments also began to have an effect; contraceptives became more usable in the latter half of the 19th century due to developments in the production of rubber. Abortion, while illegal, was also used, though the extent is unknown.

A decline in religious adherence during the 19th century (despite a shortage of data) has also been considered as a reason. While there is debate among demographers as to the relative importance of these factors, it is generally accepted that the combined effect was that mothers could begin to invest more time and nurture 'quality' into their offspring rather than having an increased 'quantity' of children, and that this led to the decrease of the total fertility rate.

By 1914, the birthrate was around 2.88 children per woman, but by 1918 this had collapsed by almost 50% due to World War One and sank to 2.03 children. In the post-World War One period, while the birthrate initially boomed reaching a peak of 3.08 children in 1920, this was followed by a rapid decline and had slumped to historic lows by the 1930s, for the first time in the country's history falling below a replacement level fertility rate. The rate did not recover until the end of the Second World War in 1945.

In the post-World War Two period, the fertility rate of the country boomed once again, reaching levels not seen since the late 19th century. This peaked in 1964, with a TFR of 2.95. However, by 1973, the fertility rate of the country again dropped below replacement levels, and has continued to decline until the present day.

It is said that the sub-replacement level fertility rate is not viewed by the government as a major issue. Little incentive has been provided to increase the birth rate throughout the UK's post war period. Compared to other countries in Western Europe, the United Kingdom's rate remains relatively high.

Family planning policies were enacted during the 1970s as a result of the rapid population growth during the 1960s. The 1973 NHS Reorganisation Act is one example: this Act made family planning advice and supplies available to the public. With previous liberalising acts such as the Abortion Act and the Divorce Reform Act, and scientific developments such as increased access to contraceptive methods such as the contraceptive pill, it is generally accepted that these social changes contributed to the decline of the fertility rate below replacement level in the latter half of the 20th century. With these changes also, pre-marital conceptions fell to 1950 levels by the late 1970s. This decline in the birth rate follows a similar pattern to other European countries.

The government's position was explained in 1984 at the UN Conference on Population in Mexico;

The United Kingdom government does not pursue a population policy in the sense of actively trying to influence the overall size of the population, its age structure, or the components of change except in the field of immigration. Nor has it expressed a view about the size of population, or the age structure, that would be desirable... The current level of births has not been the cause of general anxiety. The prevailing view is that decisions about fertility and childbearing are for people themselves to make, but that it is proper for government to provide individuals with the information and the means necessary to make their decisions effective. To this end, the government provides assistance with family planning as part of the National Health Service. The ageing of the population does raise social and economic issues. However, it is believed that these will prove manageable; and also, to a degree, that society will adapt...’

In 2003, Right to Request was set up which allowed the parents of small children to request flexible working times which included shorter working hours for parents to care for their children. However, a report in 2006 found that its impact was negligible as mothers tended to switch employers to get reduced hours regardless.

Migration in the late 1990s and 2000s led to the overall total fertility rate of the country rising by 0.1% between 2004 and 2011.

In 2012, the UK's total fertility rate (TFR) was 1.92 children per woman, below the replacement rate, which in the UK is 2.075. In 2001, the TFR was at a record low of 1.63, but it then increased every year until it reached a peak of 1.96 in 2008, before decreasing again. In 2012 and 2013, England and Wales's TFR decreased to 1.85. In Scotland however TFR was lower: it decreased from 1.75 in 2010 to 1.67 in 2012. Northern Ireland has the highest TFR in the UK, standing at 2.02 in 2010 and 2.03 in 2012.

Total fertility rate (TFR) from 1552 to 1899
Years
1552	1556	1560	1565	1570	1575	1580	1590	1595	1600	1605	1610	1615	1620	1625	1630	1640	1650
5.12	4.78	4.7	5.31	4.64	4.48	4.62	4.25	4.47	4.63	4.79	4.47	4.51	4.78	4.35	4.45	4.71	3.49
1660	1665	1670	1675	1680	1690	1695	1700	1705	1710	1715	1720	1725	1730	1735	1740	1750	1755
3.83	4.1	3.97	3.75	3.97	4.29	4.37	4.39	4.37	3.79	4.25	4.16	4.51	4.28	4.94	4.58	4.73	4.64
1760	1765	1770	1775	1780	1785	1790	1795	1797	1799	1800	1801	1802	1803	1804	1805	1806	1807
4.56	4.81	4.98	4.96	4.9	5.09	5.35	5.21	5.4	5.11	4.97	4.6	5.3	5.61	5.65	5.55	5.49	5.45
1808	1809	1810	1811	1812	1813	1814	1815	1816	1817	1818	1819	1820	1821	1822	1823	1824	1825
5.4	5.24	5.36	5.43	5.31	5.45	5.46	6.02	5.73	5.69	5.54	5.45	5.4	5.55	5.69	5.54	5.42	5.38
1826	1827	1828	1829	1830	1831	1832	1833	1834	1835	1836	1837	1838	1839	1840	1841	1842	1843
5.36	5.07	5.23	4.85	4.83	4.78	4.78	5	4.89	4.83	4.86	4.79	4.78	4.93	4.9	4.89	4.83	4.82
1844	1845	1846	1847	1848	1849	1850	1851	1852	1853	1854	1855	1856	1857	1858	1859	1860	1861
4.83	4.75	4.9	4.58	4.71	4.78	4.85	4.94	4.94	4.78	4.89	4.85	4.94	4.9	4.79	4.97	4.86	4.88
1862	1863	1864	1865	1866	1867	1868	1869	1870	1871	1872	1873	1874	1875	1876	1877	1878	1879
4.92	4.94	4.96	4.94	4.92	4.94	4.97	4.82	4.88	4.85	4.89	4.94	4.93	4.92	4.9	4.89	4.88	4.81
1880	1881	1882	1883	1884	1885	1886	1887	1888	1889	1890	1891	1892	1893	1894	1895	1896	1897
4.75	4.68	4.62	4.55	4.47	4.39	4.32	4.24	4.16	4.11	4.06	4	3.95	3.9	3.84	3.79	3.73	3.68
1898	1899																
3.62	3.58																

Birth statistics

Mean age of mother by birth order in England and Wales

Mean age of parents at birth in England and Wales

Stillbirth rate in England and Wales

Live births by age group in England and Wales

Percentage of women childless by age 30 in England and Wales by mother's year of birth

Average number of children by year of birth of the mothers in England and Wales

Percentage of births born outside of wedlock in England and Wales

Conception rate per 1000 women by age groups in England and Wales

Teenage conception rate per 1000 women in England and Wales

Total live births over time

==== Mother's mean age at first birth ====
The first available data on when a mother gives birth for the first time was in 1920.

The reduction of the total fertility rate of the United Kingdom has also had an effect on the mean age in which a mother gives birth to her first child.

The age in which a mother gives birth to her first child has changed depending on the time period, but since the 1970s the age in which someone gives birth has been trending upwards.

Mean age of childbearing
Year	Mean age of childbearing
1920	25.6
1941	23.8
1959	25.7
1960	27.8
1965	27.1
1970	26.3
1975	26.5
1980	26.9
1985	27.3
1990	27.7
2018	29

==== Family size ====
The reduction of the fertility rate has also had an effect on the general family size of mothers in the United Kingdom, with the two being interlinked with each other. The family size of the average UK family can be estimated for a "completed family size" (CFS), which is an estimate of the amount of children a woman has birthed by the end of her childbearing years.

Family size within the UK has shifted towards two or one children in recent decades, rather than in the past when larger family sizes were more prominent and sought after. This pattern is similar to other European countries, where couples are having fewer children. Increasingly, there are also more couples who are completely childless; this has been increasing since the 1950s.

Development of family size distribution (percentages)
No. of children	Years								
No. of children	1920	1925	1930	1935	1940	1945	1950	1955	1960
0	21	17	13	12	11	10	14	17	21
1	21	22	18	15	13	13	12	12	12
2	27	28	30	32	37	43	43	40	35
3	16	17	19	21	22	21	20	20	21
4 or more	15	16	20	20	17	13	11	11	11
Average family size (Completed family size of all women)	2	2.12	2.35	2.42	2.36	2.17	2.03	2.02	1.95

=== Life expectancy ===
Life expectancy in UK since 1543

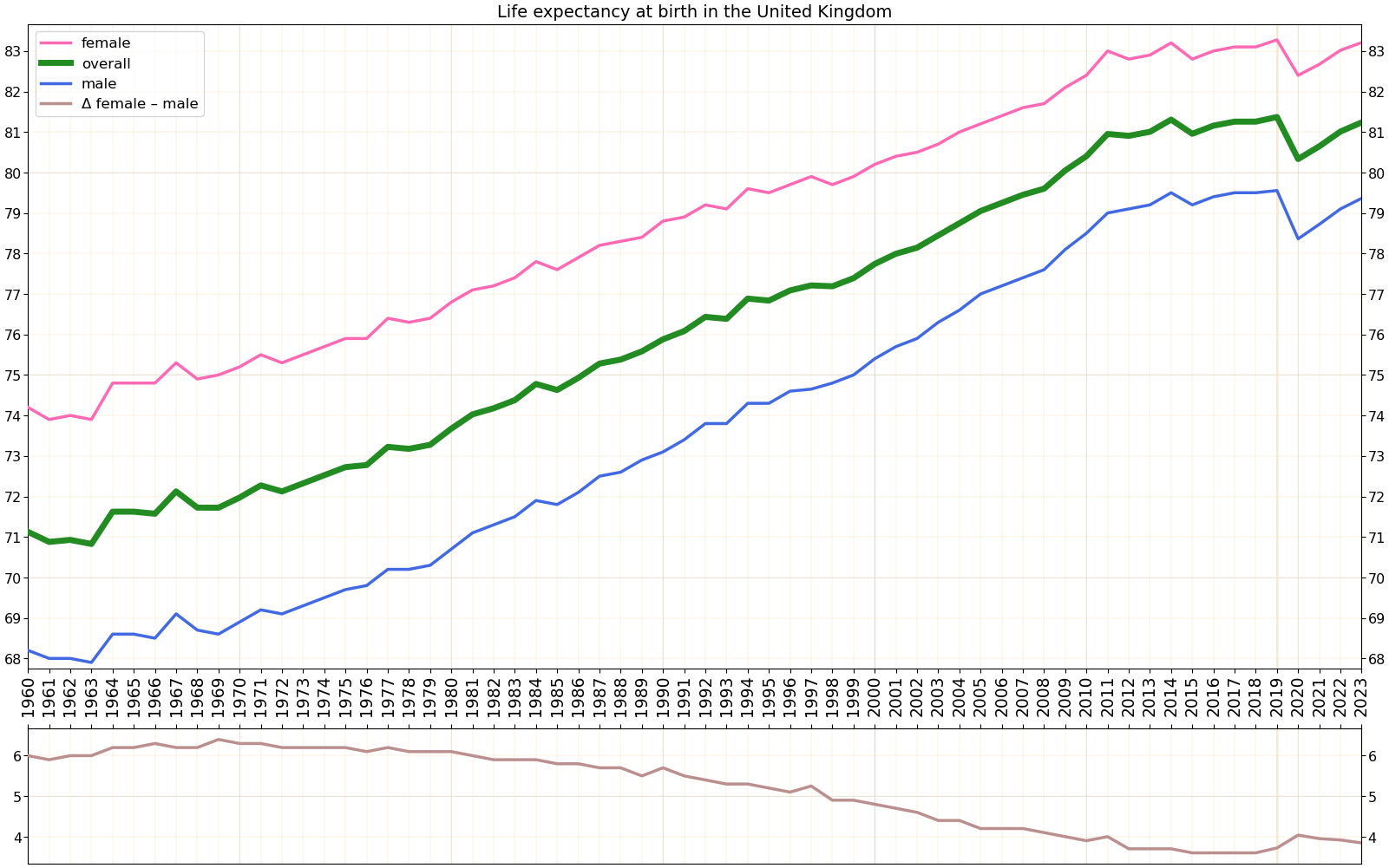
Life expectancy in UK since 1960 by gender

Life expectancy has increased in the United Kingdom since the 18th century due to precipitate declines in child mortality, see below, and from relatively minor improvements in healthcare. A life expectancy of 40, the historical norm, does not mean that person is likely to die at 40 years old but rather when he or she is very old or very young; much in line with a bathtub curve.

At the start of the 20th century, the life expectancy at birth was only 45.6 years.

By 1950, life expectancy at birth had risen to 68.6 years. During the latter half of the century, further factors influenced the increase of life expectancy: diseases and the improvement of healthcare in the 1950s, decline in smoking in the mid-1970s and improvements in treating heart disease in the 1990s contributed to its decline.

At the start of the 21st century, the life expectancy at birth was 77.8 years.

In 2011 the life expectancy at birth of the UK was around 80.4 years, but the rate of increase has been stalling. Potential factors behind this may be austerity measures imposed in the beginning of the 2010s, which coincidentally since then mortality rates have slowed down in decline or older people dying off at faster rates than expected. On the topic of austerity measures, Professor Richard Faragher has said that "It is possible to have high or rising life expectancy during austerity, as is the case in Japan. Similarly, you can have rising life expectancy despite high levels of inequality – this was the case in Britain from 1900–1950." but noted that austerity measures to social services like the NHS, especially social care support for the elderly may be causing a stalling of life expectancy increase due to a decreased quality of life for older generations.

Life expectancy from 1543 to 2015
Years
1543	1548	1553	1558	1563	1568	1573	1578	1583	1588	1593	1603	1608	1613	1618	1623	1628	1633
33.9	38.8	39.6	22.4	36.7	39.7	41.1	41.6	42.7	37.1	38.1	38.5	39.6	36.8	40.3	33.4	39.7	39.7
1638	1643	1648	1653	1658	1663	1668	1673	1678	1683	1688	1693	1698	1703	1713	1718	1723	1728
34.0	36.3	39.7	39.1	33.0	33.3	33.5	37.4	32.4	31.3	35.9	36.5	38.1	38.5	36.9	35.8	35.5	25.3
1733	1738	1743	1748	1753	1758	1763	1768	1773	1778	1783	1788	1793	1798	1803	1808	1813	1818
36.3	35.3	34.3	36.5	39.8	38.1	35.4	36.2	39.1	37.7	35.8	39.0	37.9	38.9	40.0	40.6	41.3	40.8
1823	1828	1833	1838	1842	1843	1844	1845	1846	1847	1848	1849	1850	1851	1852	1853	1854	1855
40.5	41.4	40.9	40.6	41.0	41.6	41.2	42.2	40.2	38.5	39.9	37.7	42.8	41.0	40.4	40.0	39.5	40.7
1856	1857	1858	1859	1860	1861	1862	1863	1864	1865	1866	1867	1868	1869	1870	1871	1872	1873
42.5	40.9	39.5	40.4	41.9	41.6	42.1	40.4	39.6	39.8	40.1	42.0	41.7	41.3	40.6	41.1	42.7	43.3
1874	1875	1876	1877	1878	1879	1880	1881	1882	1883	1884	1885	1886	1887	1888	1889	1890	1891
42.1	41.5	42.7	43.7	42.0	43.5	43.0	45.1	44.0	44.0	43.6	44.6	44.6	45.1	46.3	45.9	44.1	44.4
1892	1893	1894	1895	1896	1897	1898	1899	1900	1901	1902	1903	1904	1905	1906	1907	1908	1909
45.6	44.7	48.3	45.4	47.1	46.4	46.1	45.2	45.6	46.9	48.3	49.5	48.1	49.9	49.6	50.6	51.0	51.7
1910	1911	1912	1913	1914	1915	1916	1917	1918	1919	1920	1921	1922	1923	1924	1925	1926	1927
53.3	51.2	54.3	53.4	53.2	51.2	54.2	54.2	47.3	54.3	57.3	58.1	57.0	59.3	58.1	58.4	59.6	59.0
1928	1929	1930	1931	1932	1933	1934	1935	1936	1937	1938	1939	1940	1941	1942	1943	1944	1945
59.9	57.6	60.8	60.0	60.5	60.6	61.3	62.0	61.8	62.3	63.2	63.6	60.9	61.4	64.0	64.0	64.8	65.8
1946	1947	1948	1949	1950													
66.3	66.3	68.4	68.1	68.6													
1950–55			1955–60			1960–65			1965–70			1970–75			1975–80		
69.4			70.6			71.0			71.7			72.3			73.0		
1980–85			1985–90			1990–95			1995–2000			2000–05			2005–10		
74.2			75.1			76.3			77.2			78.4			79.7		
2010–15																	
81.0

==== Infant mortality ====
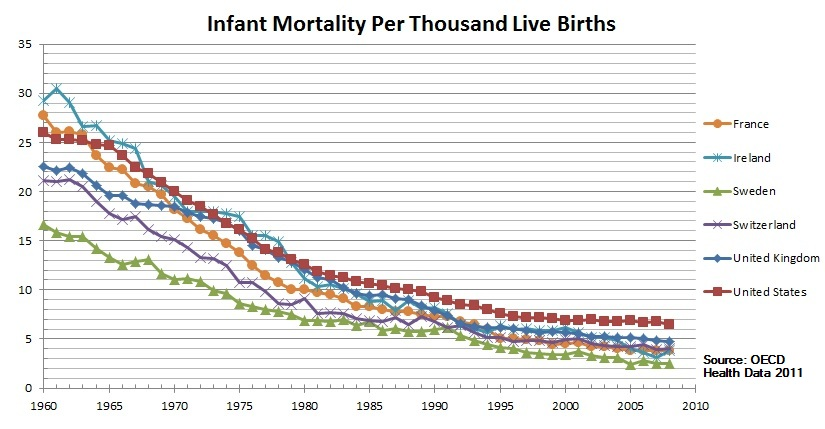
Infant mortality trends since 1960

Infant mortality has been on the decline since the Second Industrial Revolution, although the majority of the decline came around from the start to the end of the 20th century. In raw terms for example, infant mortality in England sat around 151 deaths to 1000 live births in 1901 but by the end of the century it had plummeted down to only 6 deaths per 1000 births.

There are two general lines of thought which are usually taken from into analysing the decline of infant mortality rates, the first line of thought comes from social historians, who ascribe the decline of infant mortality to social phenomenons of the time such as the need for a healthy population for the sake of the nation's fighting capabilities and political issues surrounding women. The second line of thought comes from demographers themselves which more or less ascribe the decline of infant mortality itself more to the general decline of mortality altogether in the society than any particular reason why.

Physical unfitness during the Boer War came into national prominence as many recruits came back to be too medically unfit for service. With this, In 1904, the Report of the Inter-Departmental Committee on Physical Deterioration was published which listed large amounts of details of the failings of the British population, and for that matter government, in sustaining a healthy population.

The current rate of infant mortality in the United Kingdom is roughly around 3.82 deaths per 1,000 live births.

=== Age structure ===
Population pyramid from 1950 to 2022

Population pyramid projections of the United Kingdom from 2023 up to 2100

Interlinked with fertility and mortality, the age structure of the United Kingdom has varied with how rates of fertility and mortality have changed throughout the country's history. Over the last two centuries, the United Kingdom has undergone a 'demographic transition', that is to say a transition from a high birth rate, high mortality rate society to a low birth rate, low mortality rate society, as a result of transitioning from an agrarian society to an industrialised one.

Before the 18th century, the United Kingdom retained an age structure universal to societies in the first stage of the transition theory, with high fertility rates and high mortality rates. In the late 18th century, the Industrial Revolution began, kickstarting the country's transition into the second phase: mortality rates declined but birth rates stayed at the same level; by 1870, the country had begun to transition into the third phase: the birth rate declined from around 5 children per woman to below replacement level in the 1930s. The fourth phase of the transition began in the 1960s, when the fertility rate rose, and peaked during the middle of the decade, but then collapsed by 1973 to below the replacement rate. Since then, the rate has not risen to an above replacement level fertility rate; this has resulted in a population which is currently ageing: in 2007, for the first time in the country's history, there were more people over the age of 60 than there were under the age of 16.

Peaks and bands within the population represent different periods in which people were born, for example, a large peak of people aged 70–74, born following the Second World War, and a wide band for those aged 50–59, born during the 1960s baby boom. Those aged 80 and upwards would have been born in the 1930s baby dearth when the birth rate was below replacement level. On the younger band of the population there is a noticeable gap between the ages of 14 and 20, this due to a lower number of children being born at the beginning of the 21st Century (and a subsequent lower TFR), however in the following years the birth rate rose during the 2010s and a 'broadening' of the pyramid began for those in the younger years. In relation to the sex ratio of the country, there are more women than men in the older bands of the population, reflecting the higher life expectancies of women in the population. There were estimated to be over half a million people (556,270) aged 90 and over living in the UK in 2015, up from 194,670 people in 1985, and there were estimated to be 14,570 centenarians and 850 people aged 105 or over. In the younger bands there are more men than women because there are slightly more boys born each year than girls. The Office for National Statistics has also wrote in their mid-2016 report on population projections that the median age of the British population was 40 years of age, and that this will continue to rise with an ageing population and a below-replacement level fertility level not refilling the population. This will make the number of people aged 85 and over double from 1.6 million in mid-2016 to 3.2 million in mid-2041.

Geographically, the demographic ageing of the population is not evenly spread, as people in rural areas are typically older than those living in metropolitan areas, such as Greater London.

Age structure of the population in 2020
1. 0 – 14 years (17.6%)
2. 15 – 24 years (11.5%)
3. 25 – 54 years (39.7%)
4. 55 – 64 years (12.7%)
5. 65+ years (18.5%)
Population pyramids of each constituent country

England (2020 estimate)

Scotland (2020 estimate)

Wales (2020 estimate)

Northern Ireland (2020 estimate)
Age brackets as a percentage of the total population in local authorities in 2021

Under 15 years old
Less than 15%
15 to 18%
18 to 20%
Above 20%

16 to 64 years old (working age)
Less than 60%
60 to 65%
65 to 70%
Above 70%

Above the age of 65 years old
5 to 15%
15 to 20%
20 to 25%
25% and above

Median age 1950–2100

Map of population density in the UK as at the 2011 census

Age structures 1976–2019
Ages	1976	1986	1999	2016	2019
0–15 years (%)	24.5	20.5	20.4	18.9	19.0
16–64 years (%)	61.2	64.1	63.8	63.1	62.5
65 years and over (%)	14.2	15.4	15.8	18.0	18.5

Median age of the population (projected)
Median age	1950	1960	1971	1981	1991	2000	2010	2020	2030	2040	2050	2060	2070	2080	2090	2100
Total	34.9	35.6	34.1	34.5	35.8	37.6	39.6	40.6	42.4	43.8	43.9	44.7	45.5	46.0	46.7	47.7
Male	–	–	–	–	–	–	–	39.6	–	–	–	–	–	–	–	–
Female	–	–	–	–	–	–	–	41.7	–	–	–	–	–	–	–	–

=== Urbanisation and population density ===
==== Population density ====
The United Kingdom is one of the most densely populated countries in Europe; in 2020 it was the 8th most densely populated country.

The current largest urban areas are listed below:

Largest cities or towns in the United Kingdom (England and Wales: 2011 census built-up area; Scotland: 2016 estimates settlement; Northern Ireland: 2001 census urban area)
Rank	Name	Urban area	Pop.	Rank	Name	Urban area	Pop.
1	London	Greater London	9,787,426	11	Bristol	Bristol	617,280
2	Manchester	Greater Manchester	2,553,379	12	Edinburgh	Edinburgh	512,150
3	Birmingham	West Midlands	2,440,986	13	Leicester	Leicester	508,916
4	Leeds	West Yorkshire	1,777,934	14	Belfast	Belfast	483,418
5	Glasgow	Greater Glasgow	985,290	15	Brighton	Brighton & Hove	474,485
6	Liverpool	Liverpool	864,122	16	Bournemouth	South East Dorset	466,266
7	Southampton	South Hampshire	855,569	17	Cardiff	Cardiff	390,214
8	Newcastle upon Tyne	Tyneside	774,891	18	Middlesbrough	Teesside	376,633
9	Nottingham	Nottingham	729,977	19	Stoke-on-Trent	Stoke-on-Trent	372,775
10	Sheffield	Sheffield	685,368	20	Coventry	Coventry	359,262

==== Urbanisation ====
Population expansion over time of major cities (excluding London)

Rapid urbanisation began with the onset of the Industrial Revolution in the mid to late 18th century, shifting jobs and more importantly people away from rural Britain's dominance at the time which was primarily agricultural, to manufacturing jobs within urban areas which started to spring up. In 1750, an estimated total of around only 1 million people lived in some sort of urban area such as a town or city, which was around 1/6th of the estimated total population but a century later this had risen to 8 million people in 1850, equating to just over half of the nation.

While this mass urbanisation affected pre-existing cities to a large degree such as London, smaller and 'newer' towns were in particular effected by the re-distribution of the population and exploded in raw population growth. Cities such as Birmingham, Bristol, Edinburgh, Glasgow, Liverpool, Manchester, Leeds, Sheffield and Newcastle for example had an explosive expansion in population numbers around the middle of the 19th century due to the industrial expansion of said cities bringing jobs and again people in for work. London during the 19th century become noted as the 'premier city' of the world, being the most populated city from 1825 to 1900 and being the first city in Europe and one of the first in the world to reach the figure of one million inhabitants, and then 5 million inhabitants. This urbanisation in the 19th century has had two phases. This mass influx of the population into the cities resulted in a centralisation of the population into the inner city areas however by the time of the late 19th century and early 20th century when technological advancements in transport kicked off allowing cities to expand their 'peripherals' from the inner areas to create large scale 'city regions' of their own. London in particular during the 19th century had the majority of its population within the city living in the inner centre, however by the 20th century a massive expansion of 'Outer London' began which slowly became larger in population size by the middle of the century than Inner London.

By the end of the 20th century the figure of urbanisation was 80% of the country. Importance in population size however of the capital declined during the latter half of the 20th century. By the end of the 20th century, London's ranking on the most populated cities of the world had fallen down to not even being in the top 20.

The current classification of an 'urban' area, also termed as a 'built-up area' (BUA) in the 2011 census, is a settlement which takes variables from both numerical population numbers and population density; in population numbers this is roughly more than or 10,000 people living in an area. Anything below that is classified as 'rural', having several levels of distinction to define a rural town and fringe, village or hamlet which is usually taken from population density figures. These areas are then defined within 'output areas' (OA's) themselves, which are geographic areas of the United Kingdom. The population which resides within classified 'urban' areas was 84.4% of total population in 2022 and the annual rate of urbanisation change is estimated to be around 0.8% between 2020 and 2025.

== Vital statistics ==
=== Statistics since 1887 ===
Vital statistics in England and Wales

Crude birth rate and death rate over time in England and Wales

Births and deaths over time in England and Wales

Marriages and divorces over time in England and Wales

Notable events in British demographics:

- 1890-1895 – Russian Flu
- 1914-1918 – First World War
- 1918-1919 – Spanish Flu epidemic
- 1939-1945 – Second World War
- 1946-64 – Post-World War II baby boom
- 1967 – Abortion Act came into force
- 2020-2023 – COVID-19 pandemic

	Average population (Mid-year)	Live births	Deaths	Natural change	Natural change (per 1000)	Crude migration change (per 1000)	Total Fertility Rate (Note: In fertility rates, 2.1 and above is a stable population and has been marked blue, 2 and below leads to an aging population and the result is that the population decreases.)
1887	36,599,100	1,041,937	629,287	412,650	11.3		4.24
1888	36,881,300	1,034,144	605,899	428,245	11.6	−4	4.16
1889	37,178,900	1,039,166	615,033	424,133	11.4	−3.4	4.11
1890	37,484,800	1,021,361	665,758	355,603	9.5	−1.3	4.06
1891	37,802,400	1,071,382	696,490	374,892	9.9	−1.5	4.00
1892	38,134,100	1,053,205	661,273	391,932	10.3	−1.6	3.95
1893	38,490,300	1,073,011	673,722	399,289	10.4	−1.1	3.90
1894	38,859,100	1,045,631	593,808	451,823	11.6	−2.1	3.84
1895	39,221,100	1,080,527	676,110	404,417	10.3	−1.1	3.79
1896	39,599,100	1,076,812	620,108	456,704	11.5	−2	3.73
1897	39,987,300	1,082,889	645,630	437,259	10.9	−1.2	3.68
1898	40,380,800	1,086,212	654,812	431,400	10.6	–0.9	3.62
1899	40,774,300	1,091,106	685,510	405,596	9.9	−0.3	3.58
1900	41,154,600	1,089,487	695,867	393,620	9.6	−0.3	3.53
1901	41,538,200	1,092,781	655,646	437,135	10.5	−1.3	3.49
1902	41,892,700	1,103,483	636,650	466,833	11.1	−2.7	3.44
1903	42,246,600	1,113,086	613,726	499,360	11.8	−3.4	3.40
1904	42,611,400	1,109,542	651,301	458,241	10.8	−2.2	3.35
1905	42,980,800	1,092,108	617,516	474,592	11	−2.4	3.30
1906	43,361,100	1,098,475	629,955	468,520	10.8	−2.0	3.24
1907	43,737,800	1,077,851	625,271	452,580	10.3	−1.7	3.19
1908	44,123,800	1,102,345	621,427	480,918	10.9	−2.2	3.14
1909	44,519,500	1,073,781	614,910	458,871	10.3	−1.4	3.07
1910	44,915,900	1,051,240	578,091	473,149	10.5	−1.7	2.99
1911	42,189,800	1,033,395	620,828	412,567	9.8	−74.4	2.92
1912	42,373,600	1,025,828	580,977	444,851	10.5	−6.2	2.90
1913	42,582,300	1,032,286	600,554	431,732	10.1	−5.2	2.93
1914	42,956,900	1,032,734	611,970	420,764	9.8	−1.1	2.88
1915	41,361,500	956,877	666,322	290,555	7	−45.6	2.59
1916	40,536,300	922,085	599,621	322,464	8	−28.3	2.60
1917	39,780,700	790,736	589,416	201,320	5.1	−24.1	2.10
1918	39,582,000	787,427	715,246	72,181	1.8	−6.8	2.03
1919	42,944,100	826,202	602,188	224,014	5.2	73.1	2.31
1920	43,646,400	1,126,849	555,326	571,523	13.1	3	3.08
1921	43,904,100	1,001,725	544,140	457,585	10.4	−4.6	2.69
1922	44,331,500	924,740	579,480	345,260	7.8	1.9	2.44
1923	44,563,100	900,130	526,858	373,272	8.4	−3.2	2.38
1924	44,885,600	865,329	563,891	301,438	6.7	0.5	2.28
1925	45,040,000	842,405	558,132	284,273	6.3	−2.9	2.20
1926	45,217,600	825,174	536,411	288,763	6.4	−2.5	2.15
1927	45,432,000	777,520	568,655	208,865	4.6	0.1	2.01
1928	45,622,200	783,052	543,664	239,388	5.2	−1.1	2.01
1929	45,731,000	761,963	623,231	138,732	3	−0.7	1.95
1930	45,888,900	769,239	536,860	232,379	5.1	−1.6	1.95
1931	46,073,600	749,974	573,908	176,066	3.8	0.2	1.89
1932	46,335,000	730,079	567,986	162,093	3.5	2.1	1.83
1933	46,520,000	691,560	579,467	112,093	2.4	1.6	1.72
1934	46,666,000	711,483	558,072	153,411	3.3	−0.2	1.76
1935	46,869,500	711,426	561,324	150,102	3.2	1.1	1.75
1936	47,081,300	720,129	580,942	139,187	3	1.5	1.77
1937	47,288,600	723,779	597,798	125,981	2.7	1.7	1.79
1938	47,494,100	735,573	559,598	175,975	3.7	0.6	1.84
1939	47,547,700	726,632	581,857	144,775	3.0	−1.9	1.84
1940	46,026,200	701,875	673,253	28,622	0.6	−33.7	1.74
1941	44,870,400	695,726	627,378	68,348	1.5	−27.3	1.72
1942	44,323,000	771,851	562,356	209,495	4.7	−17.1	1.93
1943	48,261,000	810,524	585,582	224,942	3.7	76.9	2.03
1944	48,261,600	878,298	573,570	303,728	6.3	−17	2.25
1945	48,668,900	795,868	567,027	228,841	4.7	3.7	2.05
1946	48,987,800	955,266	573,361	381,905	7.8	−1.3	2.47
1947	49,538,700	1,025,427	600,728	424,699	8.6	2.5	2.69
1948	50,033,200	905,182	546,002	359,180	7.2	2.7	2.39
1949	50,331,000	855,298	589,876	265,422	5.3	0.6	2.26
1950	50,381,500	818,421	590,136	228,285	4.5	−3.5	2.08
1951	50,286,900	796,645	632,786	163,859	3.3	−5.1	2.10
1952	50,429,200	792,917	573,806	219,111	4.3	−1.5	2.15
1953	50,592,900	804,269	577,220	227,049	4.5	−1.3	2.20
1954	50,764,900	794,769	578,400	216,369	4.3	−0.9	2.26
1955	50,946,100	789,315	595,916	193,399	3.8	−0.2	2.33
1956	51,183,500	825,137	597,981	227,156	4.4	0.2	2.40
1957	51,430,200	851,466	591,200	260,266	5.1	−0.3	2.48
1958	51,652,500	870,497	604,040	266,457	5.2	−0.9	2.55
1959	51,956,300	878,561	606,115	272,446	5.2	0.6	2.63
1960	52,372,500	918,286	603,328	314,958	6.0	1.9	2.71
1961	52,807,400	944,365	631,788	312,577	5.9	2.3	2.78
1962	53,291,800	975,635	636,051	339,584	6.4	2.7	2.87
1963	53,624,900	990,160	654,288	335,872	6.3	−0.1	2.90
1964	53,990,800	1,014,672	611,130	403,542	7.5	−0.7	2.95
1965	54,349,500	997,275	627,798	369,477	6.8	−0.2	2.88
1966	54,642,700	979,587	643,754	335,833	6.1	−0.8	2.80
1967	54,959,000	961,800	616,710	345,090	6.3	−0.5	2.69
1968	55,213,500	947,231	655,998	291,233	5.3	−0.7	2.61
1969	55,460,600	920,256	659,537	260,719	4.7	−0.2	2.51
1970	55,632,200	903,907	655,385	248,522	4.5	−1.4	2.44
1971	55,928,000	901,648	645,078	256,570	4.6	0.7	2.40
1972	56,096,000	833,984	673,938	160,046	2.9	0.1	2.20
1973	56,223,000	779,545	669,692	109,853	2.0	0.3	2.03
1974	56,235,000	737,138	667,359	69,779	1.2	−1.0	1.92
1975	56,225,000	697,518	662,477	35,041	0.6	−0.8	1.81
1976	56,216,000	675,526	680,799	−5,273	−0.1	−0.1	1.74
1977	56,189,000	657,038	655,143	1,895	0.0	−0.5	1.69
1978	56,178,000	686,952	667,177	19,775	0.4	−0.5	1.75
1979	56,240,000	734,572	675,576	58,996	1.0	0.1	1.86
1980	56,329,000	753,708	661,519	92,189	1.6	−0.1	1.90
1981	56,357,000	730,712	657,974	72,738	1.3	−0.8	1.82
1982	56,290,000	718,999	662,081	56,918	1.0	−2.2	1.78
1983	56,315,000	721,238	659,101	62,137	1.1	−0.7	1.77
1984	56,409,000	729,401	644,918	84,483	1.5	0.2	1.77
1985	56,554,000	750,520	670,656	79,864	1.4	1.2	1.79
1986	56,683,000	754,805	660,735	94,070	1.7	0.6	1.78
1987	56,804,000	775,405	644,342	131,063	2.3	−0.2	1.81
1988	56,916,000	787,303	649,178	138,125	2.4	−0.5	1.82
1989	57,076,000	777,036	657,733	119,303	2.1	0.7	1.79
1990	57,237,500	798,364	641,799	156,565	2.7	0.1	1.83
1991	57,438,700	792,269	646,181	146,088	2.5	1.0	1.82
1992	57,584,500	780,779	634,238	146,541	2.5	0	1.79
1993	57,713,900	761,526	658,194	103,332	1.8	0.5	1.76
1994	57,862,100	750,480	626,222	124,258	2.1	0.4	1.74
1995	58,024,800	731,882	641,712	90,170	1.6	1.2	1.71
1996	58,164,400	733,163	638,879	94,284	1.6	0.8	1.73
1997	58,314,200	726,622	632,517	94,105	1.6	1.0	1.72
1998	58,474,900	716,888	627,592	89,296	1.5	1.2	1.71
1999	58,684,400	699,976	629,476	70,500	1.2	2.4	1.68
2000	58,886,100	679,029	610,579	68,450	1.2	2.3	1.64
2001	59,113,000	669,123	604,393	64,730	1.1	2.6	1.63
2002	59,365,700	668,777	608,045	60,732	1.0	3.2	1.63
2003	59,636,700	695,549	612,085	83,464	1.4	3.1	1.70
2004	59,950,400	715,996	584,791	131,205	2.2	3	1.77
2005	60,413,300	722,549	582,964	139,585	2.3	5.4	1.76
2006	60,827,100	748,563	572,224	176,339	2.9	3.9	1.82
2007	61,319,100	772,245	574,687	197,558	3.2	4.9	1.87
2008	61,823,800	794,383	579,697	214,686	3.5	4.7	1.96
2009	62,260,500	790,204	559,617	230,587	3.7	3.4	1.89
2010	62,759,500	807,721	561,666	246,055	3.9	4.1	1.92
2011	63,285,100	807,776	552,232	255,544	4.0	4.4	1.91
2012	63,705,000	812,970	569,024	243,946	3.8	2.8	1.92
2013	64,105,700	778,803	575,458	203,345	3.2	3.1	1.83
2014	64,596,800	776,352	570,341	206,011	3.2	4.5	1.82
2015	65,110,000	777,165	602,782	174,383	2.7	5.2	1.80
2016	65,648,100	774,835	595,659	179,176	2.7	5.5	1.79
2017	66,040,200	755,066	607,172	147,894	2.2	3.5	1.74
2018	66,435,600	731,213	616,014	115,199	1.7	3.6	1.68
2019	66,796,800	712,699	604,707	107,992	1.6	3.1	1.63
2020	67,081,234	681,560	689,629	−8,069	−0.1	1.7	1.56
2021	67,026,292	694,685	666,659	28,026	0.4	3.7	1.54
2022	67,596,300	673,141	657,278	15,863	0.3	10.1	1.49
2023	68,265,200	656,847	660,772	−3,925	−0.0	13.5	1.42
2024	69,281,437	659,876	648,954	10,922	0.1	9.4	1.41
2025	69,483,900	649,410	650,468	–1,058	–0.0	2.9	1.39(e)

In 2023, 208,877 (31.8%) of all live births were to non-UK-born mothers in England and Wales. 37.3% of live births were to parents where either one or both were born outside the UK.

=== Current vital statistics ===
Period	Live births	Deaths	Natural increase
January–June 2025	320,944	337,114	–16,170
January–June 2026	318,497	329,551	–11,054
Difference	▼ –2,447 (–0.76%)	▼ –7,563 (–2.24%)	▲ +5,116

=== Total fertility rates by region ===
2023
Regions	TFR
Northern Ireland	1.68
West Midlands	1.58
East of England	1.53
South East	1.48
Yorkshire and the Humber	1.47
North West	1.46
East Midlands	1.45
North East	1.44
United Kingdom	1.42
Wales	1.42
South West	1.36
London	1.34
Scotland	1.26

==== Total fertility rate by local authority district ====
2024
Local authority district	TFR
County Durham	1.31
Darlington	1.55
Hartlepool	1.44
Middlesbrough	1.68
Northumberland	1.40
Redcar and Cleveland	1.50
Stockton-on-Tees	1.60
Gateshead	1.43
Newcastle upon Tyne	1.21
North Tyneside	1.36
South Tyneside	1.37
Sunderland	1.43
Blackburn with Darwen	1.78
Blackpool	1.56
Cheshire East	1.43
Cheshire West and Chester	1.30
Halton	1.45
Warrington	1.35
Cumberland	1.43
Westmorland and Furness	1.31
Bolton	1.80
Bury	1.62
Manchester	1.32
Oldham	1.90
Rochdale	1.70
Salford	1.33
Stockport	1.44
Tameside	1.55
Trafford	1.41
Wigan	1.47
Burnley	1.71
Chorley	1.41
Fylde	1.46
Hyndburn	1.73
Lancaster	1.32
Pendle	1.82
Preston	1.53
Ribble Valley	1.45
Rossendale	1.55
South Ribble	1.42
West Lancashire	1.43
Wyre	1.39
Knowsley	1.49
Liverpool	1.24
Sefton	1.42
St. Helens	1.44
Wirral	1.41
East Riding of Yorkshire	1.38
City of Kingston upon Hull	1.56
North East Lincolnshire	1.61
North Lincolnshire	1.62
York	1.04
North Yorkshire	1.47
Barnsley	1.52
Doncaster	1.60
Rotherham	1.57
Sheffield	1.29
Bradford	1.86
Calderdale	1.53
Kirklees	1.62
Leeds	1.28
Wakefield	1.53
Derby	1.54
Leicester	1.45
Nottingham	1.29
Rutland	1.45
North Northamptonshire	1.52
West Northamptonshire	1.49
Amber Valley	1.47
Bolsover	1.44
Chesterfield	1.40
Derbyshire Dales	1.25
Erewash	1.29
High Peak	1.40
North East Derbyshire	1.47
South Derbyshire	1.52
Blaby	1.45
Charnwood	1.36
Harborough	1.46
Hinckley and Bosworth	1.36
Melton	1.45
North West Leicestershire	1.30
Oadby and Wigston	1.49
Boston	1.73
East Lindsey	1.44
Lincoln	1.22
North Kesteven	1.32
South Holland	1.43
South Kesteven	1.36
West Lindsey	1.38
Ashfield	1.52
Bassetlaw	1.56
Broxtowe	1.19
Gedling	1.32
Mansfield	1.54
Newark and Sherwood	1.49
Rushcliffe	1.25
County of Herefordshire	1.53
Shropshire	1.40
Stoke-on-Trent	1.72
Telford and Wrekin	1.53
Cannock Chase	1.39
East Staffordshire	1.60
Lichfield	1.47
Newcastle-under-Lyme	1.31
South Staffordshire	1.44
Stafford	1.43
Staffordshire Moorlands	1.41
Tamworth	1.42
North Warwickshire	1.52
Nuneaton and Bedworth	1.57
Rugby	1.48
Stratford-on-Avon	1.47
Warwick	1.29
Birmingham	1.75
Coventry	1.45
Dudley	1.60
Sandwell	1.91
Solihull	1.51
Walsall	1.80
Wolverhampton	1.80
Bromsgrove	1.44
Malvern Hills	1.46
Redditch	1.44
Worcester	1.28
Wychavon	1.50
Wyre Forest	1.50
Bedford	1.57
Central Bedfordshire	1.59
Luton	2.00
Peterborough	1.69
Southend-on-Sea	1.50
Thurrock	1.62
Cambridge	0.95
East Cambridgeshire	1.52
Fenland	1.67
Huntingdonshire	1.43
South Cambridgeshire	1.58
Basildon	1.54
Braintree	1.52
Brentwood	1.65
Castle Point	1.53
Chelmsford	1.42
Colchester	1.44
Epping Forest	1.59
Harlow	1.73
Maldon	1.37
Rochford	1.53
Tendring	1.57
Uttlesford	1.53
Broxbourne	1.60
Dacorum	1.56
Hertsmere	1.49
North Hertfordshire	1.42
Three Rivers	1.46
Watford	1.58
St Albans	1.45
Welwyn Hatfield	1.34
East Hertfordshire	1.53
Stevenage	1.41
Breckland	1.55
Broadland	1.28
Great Yarmouth	1.44
King's Lynn and West Norfolk	1.56
North Norfolk	1.36
Norwich	1.05
South Norfolk	1.44
Babergh	1.49
Ipswich	1.56
Mid Suffolk	1.45
East Suffolk	1.44
West Suffolk	1.46
Camden	1.05
City of London	0.32
Hackney	1.33
Hammersmith and Fulham	1.16
Haringey	1.32
Islington	0.99
Kensington and Chelsea	1.09
Lambeth	1.11
Lewisham	1.29
Newham	1.54
Southwark	1.05
Tower Hamlets	1.18
Wandsworth	1.10
Westminster	1.00
Barking and Dagenham	1.99
Barnet	1.53
Bexley	1.45
Brent	1.50
Bromley	1.45
Croydon	1.58
Ealing	1.49
Enfield	1.58
Greenwich	1.31
Harrow	1.64
Havering	1.64
Hillingdon	1.69
Hounslow	1.61
Kingston upon Thames	1.25
Merton	1.35
Redbridge	1.81
Richmond upon Thames	1.34
Sutton	1.40
Waltham Forest	1.55
Bracknell Forest	1.47
Brighton and Hove	0.97
Isle of Wight	1.35
Medway	1.56
Milton Keynes	1.51
Portsmouth	1.23
Reading	1.28
Slough	1.96
Southampton	1.18
West Berkshire	1.43
Windsor and Maidenhead	1.42
Wokingham	1.46
Buckinghamshire	1.58
Eastbourne	1.34
Hastings	1.44
Lewes	1.42
Rother	1.40
Wealden	1.56
Basingstoke and Deane	1.50
East Hampshire	1.42
Eastleigh	1.40
Fareham	1.29
Gosport	1.52
Hart	1.42
Havant	1.51
New Forest	1.39
Rushmoor	1.52
Test Valley	1.54
Winchester	1.46
Ashford	1.58
Canterbury	1.25
Dartford	1.63
Dover	1.59
Gravesham	1.79
Maidstone	1.59
Sevenoaks	1.61
Folkestone and Hythe	1.55
Swale	1.67
Thanet	1.52
Tonbridge and Malling	1.54
Tunbridge Wells	1.60
Cherwell	1.54
Oxford	1.08
South Oxfordshire	1.50
Vale of White Horse	1.56
West Oxfordshire	1.39
Elmbridge	1.59
Epsom and Ewell	1.34
Guildford	1.29
Mole Valley	1.41
Reigate and Banstead	1.48
Runnymede	1.51
Spelthorne	1.54
Surrey Heath	1.38
Tandridge	1.55
Waverley	1.48
Woking	1.51
Adur	1.40
Arun	1.37
Chichester	1.44
Crawley	1.55
Horsham	1.45
Mid Sussex	1.51
Worthing	1.29
Bath and North East Somerset	1.19
Bournemouth, Christchurch and Poole	1.23
City of Bristol	1.15
Cornwall and Isles of Scilly	1.31
Dorset	1.41
North Somerset	1.45
Plymouth	1.23
South Gloucestershire	1.33
Swindon	1.46
Torbay	1.29
Wiltshire	1.45
Somerset	1.47
East Devon	1.38
Exeter	1.05
Mid Devon	1.56
North Devon	1.45
South Hams	1.29
Teignbridge	1.29
Torridge	1.44
West Devon	1.40
Cheltenham	1.29
Cotswold	1.43
Forest of Dean	1.68
Gloucester	1.45
Stroud	1.36
Tewkesbury	1.55
Isle of Anglesey	1.48
Gwynedd	1.29
Conwy	1.42
Denbighshire	1.48
Flintshire	1.48
Wrexham	1.51
Powys	1.43
Ceredigion	1.36
Pembrokeshire	1.47
Carmarthenshire	1.46
Swansea	1.21
Neath Port Talbot	1.40
Bridgend	1.40
Vale of Glamorgan	1.42
Cardiff	1.19
Rhondda Cynon Taf	1.32
Merthyr Tydfil	1.51
Caerphilly	1.35
Blaenau Gwent	1.50
Torfaen	1.50
Monmouthshire	1.41
Newport	1.64

=== Structure of the population ===
Population by Sex and Age Group (Census 27.III.2011):

Age Group	Male	Female	Total	%
Total	31,028,143	32,154,035	63,182,178	100
0–4	2,002,494	1,911,459	3,913,953	6.19
5–9	1,799,999	1,716,616	3,516,615	5.57
10–14	1,878,838	1,790,488	3,669,326	5.81
15–19	2,040,725	1,955,727	3,996,452	6.33
20–24	2,164,141	2,133,057	4,297,198	6.80
25–29	2,145,054	2,161,286	4,306,340	6.82
30–34	2,059,312	2,066,137	4,125,449	6.53
35–39	2,082,310	2,112,167	4,194,477	6.64
40–44	2,283,902	2,341,733	4,625,635	7.32
45–49	2,293,572	2,349,528	4,643,100	7.35
50–54	2,028,748	2,065,706	4,094,454	6.48
55–59	1,785,598	1,828,480	3,614,078	5.72
60–64	1,868,912	1,939,062	3,807,974	6.03
65–69	1,463,355	1,554,125	3,017,480	4.78
70–74	1,162,621	1,300,124	2,462,745	3.90
75–79	903 433	1,102,586	2,006,019	3.17
80–84	615 163	883 733	1,498,896	2.37
85–89	324 063	594 280	918 343	1.45
90–94	104 072	264 353	368 425	0.58
95–99	19 756	73 195	92 951	0.15
100+	2 075	10 193	12 268	0.02
Age group	Male	Female	Total	Per cent
0–14	5,681,331	5,418,563	11,099,894	17.57
15–64	20,752,274	20,952,883	41,705,157	66.01
65+	4,594,538	5,782,589	10,377,127	16.42

Population Estimates by Sex and Age Group (30.VI.2020) (Excluding Channel Islands (Guernsey and Jersey) and Isle of Man, shown separately, if available. Data refer to usual resident population.):

Age Group	Male	Female	Total	%
Total	33,145,709	33,935,525	67,081,234	100
0–4	1,941,390	1,840,940	3,782,330	5.64
5–9	2,125,958	2,021,455	4,147,413	6.18
10–14	2,073,515	1,971,599	4,045,114	6.03
15–19	1,893,268	1,790,412	3,683,680	5.49
20–24	2,132,032	2,001,126	4,133,158	6.16
25–29	2,280,809	2,195,821	4,476,630	6.67
30–34	2,263,511	2,258,464	4,521,975	6.74
35–39	2,179,535	2,224,565	4,404,100	6.57
40–44	2,032,071	2,059,472	4,091,543	6.10
45–49	2,126,397	2,177,570	4,303,967	6.42
50–54	2,269,897	2,346,120	4,616,017	6.88
55–59	2,216,617	2,294,234	4,510,851	6.72
60–64	1,888,526	1,967,292	3,855,818	5.75
65–69	1,624,419	1,730,962	3,355,381	5.00
70–74	1,606,864	1,757,042	3,363,906	5.01
75–79	1,114,488	1,289,271	2,403,759	3.58
80–84	759 183	967 040	1,726,223	2.57
85–89	420 012	629 854	1,049,866	1.57
90–94	162 110	308 580	470 670	0.70
95–99	32 420	91 300	123 710	0.18
100+	2 700	12 420	15 120	0.02
Age group	Male	Female	Total	Per cent
0–14	6,140,863	5,833,994	11,974,857	17.85
15–64	21,282,650	21,315,062	42,597,712	63.50
65+	5,722,196	6,786,469	12,508,665	18.65

=== Births in England and Wales by place of birth of parents ===
Parents' country of birth:

Place of birth of parent	Number of births by place of birth of father (% of total births)																Number of births by place of birth of mother (% of total births)															
Place of birth of parent	2010	2011	2012	2013	2014	2015	2016	2017	2018	2019	2020	2021	2022	2023	2024	2025	2010	2011	2012	2013	2014	2015	2016	2017	2018	2019	2020	2021	2022	2023	2024	2025
Total	723 165 (100)	723 913 (100)	729 674 (100)	698 512 (100)	695 233 (100)	697 852 (100)	696 271 (100)	679 106 (100)	657 076 (100)	640 370 (100)	613 936 (100)	624 828 (100)	605 479 (100)	591 072 (100)	594 677 (100)	585 396 (100)	723 165 (100)	723 913 (100)	729 674 (100)	698 512 (100)	695 233 (100)	697 852 (100)	696 271 (100)	679 106 (100)	657 076 (100)	640 370 (100)	613 936 (100)	624 828 (100)	605 479 (100)	591 072 (100)	594 677 (100)	585 396 (100)
United Kingdom	511 264 (70.70)	510 370 (70.50)	512 136 (70.19)	487 046 (69.73)	482 314 (69.37)	481 227 (68.96)	476 354 (68.42)	462 923 (68.17)	448 411 (68.24)	434 113 (67.79)	413 208 (67.30)	427 313 (68.39)	402 503 (66.48)	384 404 (65.04)	376 114 (63.25)	367 509 (62.78)	541 321 (74.85)	539 364 (74.51)	540 572 (74.08)	513 411 (73.50)	507 587 (73.01)	505 588 (72.45)	499 974 (71.81)	486 417 (71.63)	471 476 (71.75)	456 328 (71.26)	434 024 (70.70)	445 055 (71.23)	422 109 (69.71)	403 057 (68.19)	392 984 (66.08)	382 732 (65.38)
Total outside United Kingdom	169 393 (23.42)	171 702 (23.72)	175 639 (24.07)	172 139 (24.64)	175 118 (25.19)	179 795 (25.76)	183 764 (26.39)	180 951 (26.65)	174 579 (26.57)	173 119 (27.03)	168 742 (27.49)	168 476 (26.96)	173 197 (28.60)	178 700 (30.23)	191 993 (32.29)	192 675 (32.91)	181 827 (25.14)	184 529 (25.49)	189 079 (25.91)	185 075 (26.50)	187 610 (26.99)	192 227 (27.55)	196 254 (28.19)	192 651 (28.37)	185 569 (28.24)	184 003 (28.73)	179 881 (29.30)	179 726 (28.76)	183 309 (30.28)	187 975 (31.80)	201 660 (33.91)	202 612 (34.61)
Not Stated	42 508 (5.88)	41 841 (5.78)	41 899 (5.74)	39 327 (5.63)	37 801 (5.44)	36 830 (5.28)	36 153 (5.19)	35 232 (5.19)	34 086 (5.19)	33 138 (5.17)	31 986 (5.21)	29 039 (4.65)	29 779 (4.92)	27 968 (4.73)	26 570 (4.47)	25 212 (4.31)	17 (0.00)	20 (0.00)	23 (0.00)	26 (0.00)	36 (0.00)	37 (0.00)	43 (0.00)	38 (0.00)	31 (0.00)	39 (0.00)	31 (0.01)	47 (0.01)	61 (0.01)	40 (0.01)	33 (0.01)	52 (0.01)
Total outside United Kingdom detail :																																
EU	41 269 (5.71)	43 335 (5.99)	46 418 (6.36)	47 607 (6.82)	50 512 (7.27)	55 334 (7.93)	57 858 (8.31)	58 565 (8.62)	57 540 (8.76)	55 626 (8.69)	52 325 (8.52)	51 720 (8.28)	47 423 (7.83)	42 630 (7.21)	38 949 (6.55)	35 414 (6.05)	52 699 (7.29)	55 058 (7.61)	58 911 (8.07)	60 448 (8.65)	64 067 (9.22)	69 070 (9.90)	71 669 (10.29)	71 472 (10.52)	69 775 (10.62)	67 645 (10.56)	63 732 (10.38)	62 992 (10.08)	58 037 (9.59)	51 855 (8.77)	47 475 (7.98)	43 776 (7.48)
Germany	4 368 (0.60)	4 298 (0.59)	4 187 (0.57)	3 957 (0.57)	3 988 (0.57)	3 972 (0.57)	3 875 (0.56)	3 687 (0.54)	3 653 (0.56)	3 198 (0.50)	3 107 (0.51)						5 328 (0.74)	5 108 (0.71)	5 064 (0.69)	4 838 (0.69)	4 708 (0.68)	4 667 (0.67)	4 560 (0.65)	4 245 (0.63)	3 917 (0.60)	3 816 (0.60)	3 609 (0.59)	3 511 (0.56)	3 154 (0.52)			
New EU	25 758 (3.56)	27 962 (3.86)	30 695 (4.21)	31 992 (4.58)	34 139 (4.91)	38 009 (5.45)	39 985 (5.74)	40 636 (5.98)	39 933 (6.08)	38 490 (6.01)	35 651 (5.81)	34 666 (5.55)	31 515 (5.20)	27 333 (4.62)	23 934 (4.02)	20 763 (3.55)	34 194 (4.73)	37 063 (5.12)	40 821 (5.59)	42 523 (6.09)	45 344 (6.52)	49 642 (7.11)	51 962 (7.46)	51 863 (7.64)	50 840 (7.74)	48 716 (7.61)	45 034 (7.34)	43 823 (7.01)	39 896 (6.59)	34 739 (5.88)	30 406 (5.11)	26 841 (4.59)
Romania			3 867 (0.53)	4 387 (0.63)	5 414 (0.78)	7 856 (1.13)	10 684 (1.53)	12 856 (1.89)	14 269 (2.17)	15 211 (2.38)	14 791 (2.41)	15 099 (2.42)	14 651 (2.42)	12 884 (2.18)	11 404 (1.92)	9 942 (1.70)			4 406 (0.60)	4 956 (0.71)	6 102 (0.88)	8 734 (1.25)	11 721 (1.68)	13 717 (2.02)	15 196 (2.31)	16 069 (2.51)	15 713 (2.56)	15 894 (2.54)	15 518 (2.56)	13 717 (2.32)	12 182 (2.05)	10 649 (1.82)
Poland	15 619 (2.16)	16 150 (2.23)	16 432 (2.25)	16 436 (2.35)	16 950 (2.44)	17 704 (2.54)	16 956 (2.44)	15 610 (2.30)	13 838 (2.11)	12 041 (1.88)	10 542 (1.72)	9 458 (1.51)	7 613 (1.26)	6 344 (1.07)	5 249 (0.88)	4 438 (0.76)	19 762 (2.73)	20 495 (2.83)	21 156 (2.90)	21 275 (3.05)	22 122 (3.18)	22 928 (3.29)	22 382 (3.21)	20 779 (3.06)	18 765 (2.86)	16 737 (2.61)	14 633 (2.38)	13 373 (2.14)	11 107 (1.83)	9 420 (1.59)	7 855 (1.32)	6 943 (1.19)
Lithuania						3 512 (0.50)		3 454 (0.51)										3 788 (0.52)	4 535 (0.62)	4 595 (0.66)	4 786 (0.69)	4 872 (0.70)	4 912 (0.71)	4 803 (0.71)	4 517 (0.69)	4 133 (0.65)	3 619 (0.59)	3 499 (0.56)				
Rest of Europe (non EU)	7 392 (1.02)	7 276 (1.01)	7 705 (1.06)	7 608 (1.09)	8 185 (1.18)	8 776 (1.26)	9 289 (1.33)	9 552 (1.41)	9 697 (1.48)	10 553 (1.65)	10 765 (1.75)	11 346 (1.82)	11 557 (1.91)	12 175 (2.06)	12 226 (2.06)	11 549 (1.97)	7 548 (1.04)	7 537 (1.04)	7 890 (1.08)	7 959 (1.14)	8 562 (1.23)	9 208 (1.32)	9 930 (1.43)	10 385 (1.53)	10 599 (1.61)	11 418 (1.78)	11 574 (1.89)	11 974 (1.92)	12 053 (1.99)	12 573 (2.13)	12 373 (2.08)	11 829 (2.02)
Albania												3 344 (0.54)	3 768 (0.62)	4 377 (0.74)	4 399 (0.74)	4 123 (0.70)												3 260 (0.52)	3 515 (0.58)	3 891 (0.66)	3 651 (0.61)	3 483 (0.59)
Africa	40 816 (5.64)	39 746 (5.49)	39 026 (5.35)	37 563 (5.38)	37 067 (5.33)	36 876 (5.28)	36 667 (5.27)	35 459 (5.22)	33 741 (5.14)	33 375 (5.21)	32 197 (5.24)	31 800 (5.09)	35 053 (5.79)	38 950 (6.59)	43 273 (7.28)	45 000 (7.69)	39 828 (5.51)	38 523 (5.32)	37 837 (5.19)	36 264 (5.19)	35 030 (5.04)	34 960 (5.01)	34 437 (4.95)	32 875 (4.84)	31 158 (4.74)	30 753 (4.80)	29 660 (4.83)	29 150 (4.67)	32 315 (5.34)	36 623 (6.20)	41 145 (6.92)	42 589 (7.28)
North Africa	4 939 (0.68)	4 650 (0.64)	4 504 (0.62)	4 632 (0.66)	4 737 (0.68)	4 760 (0.68)	4 762 (0.68)	4 669 (0.69)	4 669 (0.71)	4 874 (0.76)	4 808 (0.78)	4 531 (0.73)	4 720 (0.78)	4 713 (0.80)	5 066 (0.85)	5 255 (0.90)	3 839 (0.53)	3 562 (0.49)	3 488 (0.48)	3 661 (0.52)	3 733 (0.54)	3 853 (0.55)	3 901 (0.56)	3 907 (0.58)	3 945 (0.60)	4 145 (0.65)	4 270 (0.70)	4 006 (0.64)	4 256 (0.70)	4 262 (0.72)	4 699 (0.79)	4 951 (0.85)
Western Africa	14 240 (1.97)	14 336 (1.98)	14 546 (1.99)	14 314 (2.05)	14 508 (2.09)	14 350 (2.06)	14 383 (2.07)	13 733 (2.02)	13 246 (2.02)	12 992 (2.03)	12 689 (2.07)	12 828 (2.05)	15 696 (2.59)	19 753 (3.34)	23 102 (3.88)	24 339 (4.16)	13 217 (1.83)	13 067 (1.81)	13 344 (1.83)	12 906 (1.85)	12 613 (1.81)	12 472 (1.79)	12 254 (1.76)	11 381 (1.68)	10 809 (1.65%)	10 625 (1.66)	10 468 (1.71)	10 487 (1.68)	13 313 (2.20)	17 644 (2.99)	20 932 (3.52)	22 078 (3.77)
Nigeria	8 129 (1.12)	8 335 (1.15)	8 628 (1.18)	8 397 (1.20)	8 467 (1.22)	8 339 (1.19)	8 208 (1.18)	7 821 (1.15)	7 494 (1.14)	7 201 (1.12)	7 124 (1.16)	7 492 (1.20)	10 042 (1.66)	13 815 (2.34)	16 188 (2.72)	17 116 (2.92)	7 332 (1.01)	7 476 (1.03)	7 685 (1.05)	7 267 (1.04)	7 030 (1.01)	6 829 (0.98)	6 635 (0.95)	6 074 (0.89)	5 769 (0.88)	5 634 (0.88)	5 575 (0.91)	5 907 (0.95)	8 458 (1.40)	12 312 (2.08)	14 671 (2.47)	15 509 (2.65)
Ghana	3 487 (0.48)	3 346 (0.46)					3 545 (0.51)		3 405 (0.52)	3 366 (0.53)	3 241 (0.53)	3 085 (0.49)	3 418 (0.56)	3 798 (0.64)	4 759 (0.80)	5 101 (0.87)	3 566 (0.49)													3 363 (0.57)	4 374 (0.74)	4 722 (0.81)
Central Africa	2 468 (0.34)	2 271 (0.31)	2 228 (0.31)	2 196 (0.31)	2 212 (0.32)	2 212 (0.32)	2 216 (0.32)	2 248 (0.33)	2 126 (0.32)	2 033 (0.32)	1 926 (0.31)	1 805 (0.29)	1 950 (0.32)	1 874 (0.32)	1 775 (0.30)	1 733 (0.30)	2 599 (0.36)	2 364 (0.33)	2 356 (0.32)	2 288 (0.33)	2 275 (0.33)	2 343 (0.34)	2 247 (0.32)	2 245 (0.33)	2 117 (0.32%)	2 075 (0.32)	1 890 (0.31)	1 838 (0.29)	1 848 (0.31)	1 781 (0.30)	1 687 (0.28)	1 634 (0.28)
Eastern Africa	14 427 (1.99)	13 930 (1.92)	13 172 (1.81)	12 280 (1.76)	11 656 (1.68)	11 719 (1.68)	11 510 (1.65)	11 145 (1.64)	10 350 (1.58)	10 224 (1.60)	9 529 (1.55)	9 340 (1.49)	9 514 (1.57)	9 540 (1.61)	10 323 (1.74)	10 649 (1.82)	15 417 (2.13)	14 800 (2.04)	14 149 (1.94)	13 305 (1.90)	12 586 (1.81)	12 499 (1.79)	12 371 (1.78)	11 899 (1.75)	11 017 (1.68%)	10 759 (1.68)	10 013 (1.63)	9 751 (1.56)	9 895 (1.63)	10 029 (1.70)	10 860 (1.83)	11 036 (1.89)
Somalia	5 311 (0.73)	5 171 (0.71)	4 877 (0.67)	4 540 (0.65)	4 334 (0.62)	4 286 (0.61)	4 346 (0.62)	4 139 (0.61)	3 635 (0.55)	3 586 (0.56)	3 289 (0.54)	3 168 (0.51)	3 039 (0.50)				5 882 (0.81)	5 654 (0.78)	5 300 (0.73)	4 897 (0.70)	4 696 (0.68)	4 636 (0.66)	4 621 (0.66)	4 390 (0.65)	3 765 (0.57)	3 698 (0.58)	3 347 (0.55)					
Southern Africa	4 633 (0.64)	4 465 (0.62)	4 477 (0.61)	4 051 (0.58)	3 887 (0.56)	3 767 (0.54)	3 736 (0.54)	3 612 (0.53)	3 305 (0.50)	3 208 (0.50)	3 204 (0.52)	3 238 (0.52)	3 127 (0.52)	3 038 (0.51)	2 982 (0.50)	3 007 (0.51)	4 675 (0.65)	4 651 (0.64)	4 425 (0.61)	4 032 (0.58)	3 765 (0.54)	3 743 (0.54)	3 613 (0.52)	3 395 (0.50)	3 231 (0.49)	3 113 (0.49)	2 985 (0.49)	3 018 (0.48)	2 952 (0.49)	2 883 (0.49)	2 942 (0.49)	2 872 (0.49)
South Africa	4 485 (0.62)	4 325 (0.60)	4 337 (0.59)	3 885 (0.56)	3 744 (0.54)	3 618 (0.52)	3 559 (0.51)	3 473 (0.51)	3 178 (0.48)								4 456 (0.62)	4 430 (0.61)	4 231 (0.58)	3 824 (0.55)		3 537 (0.51)										
The Americas and the Caribbean	10 865 (1.50)	10 673 (1.47)	10 861 (1.49)	10 196 (1.46)	10 541 (1.52)	10 360 (1.48)	10 606 (1.52)	10 236 (1.51)	10 061 (1.53)	10 030 (1.57)	9 844 (1.60)	10 169 (1.63)	10 259 (1.69)	10 056 (1.70)	10 149 (1.71)	9 957 (1.70)	11 494 (1.59)	11 286 (1.56)	11 317 (1.55)	10 933 (1.57)	11 191 (1.61)	11 346 (1.63)	11 441 (1.64)	11 102 (1.63)	11 097 (1.69)	10 927 (1.71)	10 912 (1.78)	11 439 (1.83)	11 487 (1.90)	11 294 (1.91)	11 298 (1.90)	11 176 (1.91)
North America	3 648 (0.50)	3 680 (0.51)	3 710 (0.51)	3 465 (0.50)	3 728 (0.54)	3 596 (0.52)	3 711 (0.53)	3 482 (0.51)	3 461 (0.53)	3 407 (0.53)	3 329 (0.54)	3 468 (0.56)	3 236 (0.53)	3 231 (0.55)	3 390 (0.57)	3 417 (0.58)	4 604 (0.64)	4 518 (0.62)	4 567 (0.63)	4 382 (0.63)	4 586 (0.66)	4 564 (0.65)	4 633 (0.67)	4 429 (0.65)	4 476 (0.68)	4 338 (0.68)	4 206 (0.69)	4 583 (0.73)	4 257 (0.70)	4 316 (0.73)	4 350 (0.73)	4 453 (0.76)
United States Of America																								3 271 (0.48)	3 333 (0.51)	3 240 (0.51)	3 145 (0.51)	3 446 (0.55)	3 200 (0.53)	3 229 (0.55)		
Central America	233 (0.03)	252 (0.03)	221 (0.03)	249 (0.04)	243 (0.03)	284 (0.04)	284 (0.04)	254 (0.04)	274 (0.04)	279 (0.04)	279 (0.05)	342 (0.05)	383 (0.06)	415 (0.07)	384 (0.06)	405 (0.07)	343 (0.05)	373 (0.05)	345 (0.05)	365 (0.05)	403 (0.06)	414 (0.06)	402 (0.06)	410 (0.06)	428 (0.07)	412 (0.06)	427 (0.07)	494 (0.08)	513 (0.08)	565 (0.10)	540 (0.09)	543 (0.09)
South America	2 427 (0.34)	2 363 (0.33)	2 461 (0.34)	2 438 (0.35)	2 624 (0.38)	2 698 (0.39)	2 935 (0.42)	2 930 (0.43)	3 027 (0.46)	3 095 (0.48)	3 245 (0.53)	3 414 (0.55)	3 651 (0.60)	3 583 (0.61)	3 547 (0.60)	3 521 (0.60)	3 378 (0.47)	3 282 (0.45)	3 285 (0.45)	3 301 (0.47)	3 419 (0.49)	3 594 (0.52)	3 799 (0.55)	3 823 (0.56)	3 813 (0.58)	3 939 (0.62)	4 117 (0.67)	4 238 (0.68)	4 509 (0.74)	4 409 (0.75)	4 398 (0.74)	4 354 (0.74)
Caribbean	4 557 (0.63)	4 378 (0.60)	4 469 (0.61)	4 044 (0.58)	3 946 (0.57)	3 782 (0.54)	3 676 (0.53)	3 570 (0.53)	3 299 (0.50)	3 249 (0.51)	2 991 (0.49)	2 945 (0.47)	2 989 (0.49)	2 827 (0.48)	2 828 (0.48)	2 614 (0.45)	3 169 (0.44)	3 113 (0.43)	3 120 (0.43)	2 885 (0.41)	2 783 (0.40)	2 774 (0.40)	2 607 (0.37)	2 440 (0.36)	2 380 (0.36)	2 238 (0.35)	2 162 (0.35)	2 124 (0.34)	2 208 (0.36)	2 004 (0.34)	2 010 (0.34)	1 826 (0.31)
Middle East and Asia	65 060 (9.00)	66 963 (9.25)	67 999 (9.32)	65 764 (9.41)	65 634 (9.44)	65 419 (9.37)	66 259 (9.52)	64 234 (9.46)	60 879 (9.27)	61 081 (9.54)	61 258 (9.98)	61 002 (9.76)	66 899 (11.05)	72 936 (12.34)	85 346 (14.35)	88 815 (15.17)	66 348 (9.17)	68 534 (9.47)	69 667 (9.55)	66 324 (9.50)	65 725 (9.45)	64 748 (9.28)	65 961 (9.47)	64 126 (9.44)	60 431 (9.20)	60 881 (9.51)	61 760 (10.06)	61 854 (9.90)	67 342 (11.12)	73 691 (12.47)	87 311 (14.68)	91 265 (15.59)
Middle East	8 035 (1.11)	7 967 (1.10)	7 926 (1.09)	8 049 (1.15)	8 392 (1.21)	8 753 (1.25)	9 229 (1.33)	9 578 (1.41)	9 801 (1.49)	9 693 (1.51)	9 452 (1.54)	9 687 (1.55)	10 302 (1.70)	10 622 (1.80)	11 650 (1.96)	12 699 (2.17)	6 657 (0.92)	6 793 (0.94)	6 781 (0.93)	6 773 (0.97)	7 073 (1.02)	7 409 (1.06)	7 883 (1.13)	8 269 (1.22)	8 433 (1.28)	8 600 (1.34)	8 387 (1.37)	8 676 (1.39)	9 255 (1.53)	9 651 (1.63)	10 746 (1.81)	11 750 (2.01)
Central Asia	166 (0.02)	161 (0.02)	190 (0.03)	185 (0.03)	220 (0.03)	188 (0.03)	193 (0.03)	189 (0.03)	223 (0.03)	179 (0.03)	210 (0.03)	222 (0.04)	219 (0.04)	265 (0.04)	318 (0.05)	313 (0.05)	296 (0.04)	360 (0.05)	375 (0.05)	364 (0.05)	376 (0.05)	422 (0.06)	403 (0.06)	397 (0.06)	432 (0.07)	363 (0.06)	415 (0.07)	368 (0.06)	352 (0.06)	394 (0.07)	433 (0.07)	451 (0.08)
Eastern Asia	4 019 (0.56)	4 030 (0.56)	4 493 (0.62)	3 724 (0.53)	4 118 (0.59)	3 724 (0.53)	3 912 (0.56)	3 457 (0.51)	3 104 (0.47)	3 016 (0.47)	2 721 (0.44)	2 419 (0.39)	2 657 (0.44)	2 813 (0.48)	3 017 (0.51)	2 728 (0.47)	5 931 (0.82)	5 928 (0.82)	6 541 (0.90)	5 605 (0.80)	6 072 (0.87)	5 538 (0.79)	5 836 (0.84)	5 346 (0.79)	4 765 (0.73)	4 614 (0.72)	4 129 (0.67)	3 871 (0.62)	4 075 (0.67)	4 042 (0.68)	4 336 (0.73)	3 968 (0.68)
China																		3 611 (0.50)			3 882 (0.56)		3 596 (0.52)									
Southern Asia	48 722 (6.74)	50 693 (7.00)	51 472 (7.05)	50 389 (7.21)	49 602 (7.13)	49 468 (7.09)	49 799 (7.15)	48 143 (7.09)	45 047 (6.86)	45 482 (7.10)	46 059 (7.50)	45 924 (7.35)	50 645 (8.36)	55 707 (9.42)	66 429 (11.17)	69 107 (11.81)	46 737 (6.46)	48 817 (6.74)	49 302 (6.76)	47 755 (6.84)	46 485 (6.69)	45 795 (6.56)	46 409 (6.67)	44 953 (6.62)	42 007 (6.39)	42 556 (6.65)	44 008 (7.17)	44 170 (7.07)	48 645 (8.03)	54 152 (9.16)	65 844 (11.07)	69 023 (11.79)
India	12 799 (1.77)	14 181 (1.96)	13 991 (1.92)	13 662 (1.96)	13 639 (1.96)	13 798 (1.98)	14 007 (2.01)	13 715 (2.02)	12 968 (1.97)	13 569 (2.12)	14 631 (2.38)	15 452 (2.47)	18 013 (2.97)	21 750 (3.68)	26 333 (4.43)	27 662 (4.73)	13 575 (1.88)	14 892 (2.06)	14 621 (2.00)	14 044 (2.01)	13 735 (1.98)	13 780 (1.97)	13 883 (1.99)	13 476 (1.98)	12 675 (1.93)	13 108 (2.05)	14 404 (2.35)	15 260 (2.44)	17 745 (2.93)	21 513 (3.64)	26 146 (4.40)	27 601 (4.71)
Pakistan	19 091 (2.64)	19 612 (2.71)	20 280 (2.78)	20 068 (2.87)	19 601 (2.82)	19 236 (2.76)	19 131 (2.75)	18 513 (2.73)	17 334 (2.64)	17 519 (2.74)	17 140 (2.79)	16 375 (2.62)	17 393 (2.87)	18 227 (3.08)	21 389 (3.60)	21 816 (3.73)	17 840 (2.47)	18 434 (2.55)	19 091 (2.62)	18 578 (2.66)	17 943 (2.58)	17 342 (2.49)	17 367 (2.49)	17 099 (2.52)	15 996 (2.43)	16 320 (2.55)	16 460 (2.68)	15 791 (2.53)	16 654 (2.75)	17 715 (3.00)	21 524 (3.62)	22 058 (3.77)
Bangladesh	9 105 (1.26)	9 027 (1.25)	9 033 (1.24)	8 776 (1.26)	8 534 (1.23)	8 699 (1.25)	8 876 (1.27)	8 286 (1.22)	7 754 (1.18)	7 371 (1.15)	7 244 (1.18)	7 184 (1.15)	7 435 (1.23)	8 160 (1.38)	9 822 (1.65)	10 085 (1.72)	8 360 (1.16)	8 371 (1.16)	8 224 (1.13)	7 982 (1.14)	7 783 (1.12)	7 752 (1.11)	8 106 (1.16)	7 426 (1.09)	7 027 (1.07)	6 774 (1.06)	6 767 (1.10)	6 790 (1.09)	7 007 (1.16)	7 889 (1.33)	9 832 (1.65)	10 334 (1.77)
Afghanistan										3 232 (0.50)	3 275 (0.53)	3 345 (0.54)	4 254 (0.70)	3 818 (0.65)	4 490 (0.76)	5 072 (0.87)													3 875 (0.64)	3 388 (0.57)	4 083 (0.69)	4 663 (0.80)
Sri Lanka	3 717 (0.51)	3 698 (0.51)	3 745 (0.51)	3 530 (0.51)	3 509 (0.50)												3 511 (0.49)															
South East Asia	4 048 (0.56)	4 040 (0.56)	3 860 (0.53)	3 374 (0.48)	3 237 (0.47)	3 226 (0.46)	3 075 (0.44)	2 831 (0.42)	2 660 (0.40)	2 661 (0.42)	2 769 (0.45)	2 711 (0.43)	3 041 (0.50)	3 499 (0.59)	3 899 (0.66)	3 934 (0.67)	6 650 (0.92)	6 561 (0.91)	6 592 (0.90)	5 774 (0.83)	5 641 (0.81)	5 519 (0.79)	5 365 (0.77)	5 117 (0.75)	4 725 (0.72)	4 681 (0.73)	4 755 (0.77)	4 714 (0.75)	4 955 (0.82)	5 405 (0.91)	5 889 (0.99)	6 018 (1.03)
Antarctica and Oceania	3 991 (0.55)	3 709 (0.51)	3 630 (0.50)	3 401 (0.49)	3 179 (0.46)	3 030 (0.43)	3 085 (0.44)	2 905 (0.43)	2 661 (0.40)	2 454 (0.38)	2 353 (0.38)	2 439 (0.39)	2 006 (0.33)	1 953 (0.33)	2 050 (0.34)	1 940 (0.33)	3 910 (0.54)	3 591 (0.50)	3 457 (0.47)	3 147 (0.45)	3 035 (0.44))	2 895 (0.41)	2 816 (0.40)	2 691 (0.40)	2 509 (0.38)	2 379 (0.37)	2 243 (0.37)	2 317 (0.37)	2 075 (0.34)	1 939 (0.33)	2 058 (0.35)	1 977 (0.34)
Australasia	3 707 (0.51)	3 434 (0.47)	3 344 (0.46)	3 124 (0.45)	2 903 (0.42)	2 788 (0.40)	2 861 (0.41)	2 667 (0.39)	2 439 (0.37)	2 257 (0.35)	2 182 (0.36)	2 251 (0.36)	1 820 (0.30)	1 768 (0.30)	1 822 (0.31)	1 757 (0.30)	3 660 (0.51)	3 350 (0.46)	3 232 (0.44)	2 921 (0.42)	2 800 (0.40)	2 695 (0.39)	2 602 (0.37)	2 499 (0.37)	2 335 (0.36)	2 219 (0.35)	2 101 (0.34)	2 185 (0.35)	1 921 (0.32)	1 790 (0.30)	1 881 (0.32)	1 817 (0.31)
Other Oceania	284 (0.04)	274 (0.04)	286 (0.04)	277 (0.04)	276 (0.04)	242 (0.03)	224 (0.03)	238 (0.04)	222 (0.03)	197 (0.03)	171 (0.03)	188 (0.03)	186 (0.03)	185 (0.03)	228 (0.04)	183 (0.3)	249 (0.03)	239 (0.03)	223 (0.03)	226 (0.03)	235 (0.03)	200 (0.03)	214 (0.03)	192 (0.03)	174 (0.03)	160 (0.02)	142 (0.02)	132 (0.02)	154 (0.03)	149 (0.03)	177 (0.03)	160 (0.03)

== Social issues ==
=== Marriage, divorce, families and household types ===
==== Marriage and divorce ====
Marriage status of England and Wales in 2020

In 2004, 58% of births were conceived within a married couple, 35% by non-married couples registered by both parents and 7% by non-married mothers who registered the birth alone.

This varied from each constituent nation, Wales for example had the highest births outside of marriage at 51% in 2004, In England this percentage was 42% and in Scotland 47%. Northern Ireland had the lowest of 35% in 2004.

Number of marriages in the United Kingdom 1887–2016

Opposite sex marriage rate over time in England and Wales

Number of divorces in England and Wales 1858–2020

Opposite sex divorce rate in England and Wales

Median age at divorce in England and Wales

Culmulative percentage of marriages ending in divorce by year of marriage in England and Wales
Age structure of population groups relating to marriage

Never Married

Married or in Civil partnership

Divorced or dissolved Civil partnership

Widowed or surviving member of Civil partnership

==== Household and family type ====
Type of households out of total households in 2021

Family types out of total families in 2021

Percentage of age group living with parents in 2021

=== Sexual orientation ===
Sexual identification 2014–2020

Out of the 600,000 people in the UK that applied to go to university through UCAS in 2020, 7.2%, or 40,000, described themselves as LGBT on their application form. UCAS estimates this to be a rate 2.5 times higher than the overall UK population. The UCAS report in collaboration with Stonewall also found LGBT students were more likely to come from disadvantaged backgrounds (compared to those who identified as heterosexual or didn't specify), have a disability (compared to non-LGBT students) and have a mental health condition (compared to non-LGBT students).

For the first time, the 2021 United Kingdom census included a question on sexual orientation. Results for Scotland are expected to be published from spring 2024 onwards.

Results of the 2021 United Kingdom census
Sexual orientation (aged 16 and over)
Sexual orientation (aged 16 and over)	England and Wales	Northern Ireland
Straight or Heterosexual	89.4%	90.0%
Gay or Lesbian	1.5%	1.2%
Bisexual	1.3%	0.8%
All other sexual orientations	0.3%	0.2%
Not answered	7.5%	7.9%

=== Gender identity ===
In the 2021 United Kingdom census, in England and Wales, 262,000 people (0.5%) answered that their gender identity was different from their sex assigned at birth, including 0.10% who identified as a trans man, 0.10% as a trans woman, and 0.06% as non-binary. 1% of people aged 16 to 24 years said that their gender identity was different from their sex assigned at birth.

=== Abortion ===
Percentage of conceptions leading to an abortion overtime from 1969 to 2020

Abortion in the United Kingdom (however not Northern Ireland) was officially decriminalised under the Abortion Act 1967, allowing women for the first time to get an abortion under numerous medical grounds outlined within the act. Previously, this was outlawed under the Offences Against the Person Act 1861 and then the updated Infant Life (Preservation) Act 1929 which only permitted an abortion if the death of a child was "done in good faith for the purpose only of preserving the life of the mother".

In 2020, the number of conceptions which led to an abortion was around 25.3%

Conceptions leading to an abortion from 1969 to 2022
Year	Percentage of conceptions leading to an abortion
1969	5.98%
1971	11.32%
1976	15.17%
1981	17.09%
1986	18.02%
1991	19.6%
1996	20.55%
2001	23%
2006	22.26%
2011	20.88%
2016	21.5%
2021	26.5%
2022	29.7%

== Health ==
=== General health ===
Semantic scale of general health (self-identified) in England & Wales
	2001		2011		2021	
	Number	%	Number	%	Number	%
Very good health	35,676,210	68.6%	26,434,409	47.1%	28,827,308	48.4%
Good health	35,676,210	68.6%	19,094,820	34.1%	20,046,220	33.6%
Fair health	11,568,363	22.2%	7,401,881	13.2%	7,597,001	12.7%
Bad health	4,797,343	9.2%	2,428,668	4.3%	2,412,358	4.0%
Very bad health	4,797,343	9.2%	716,134	1.3%	714,655	1.2%
Total	52,041,916	100%	56,075,912	100%	59,597,542	100%

Death rate and cause

Leading causes of death for males, 2001–2018

Leading causes of death for females, 2001–2018

=== Health issues ===
Health issues in graphs

UK obesity rates, 1990–2022

The UK smoking rate from 1974 to 2020

The percentage of the UK public who consume alcohol weekly, 2005–2017

The suicide rate in England and Wales per 100,000 people, 1981–2020

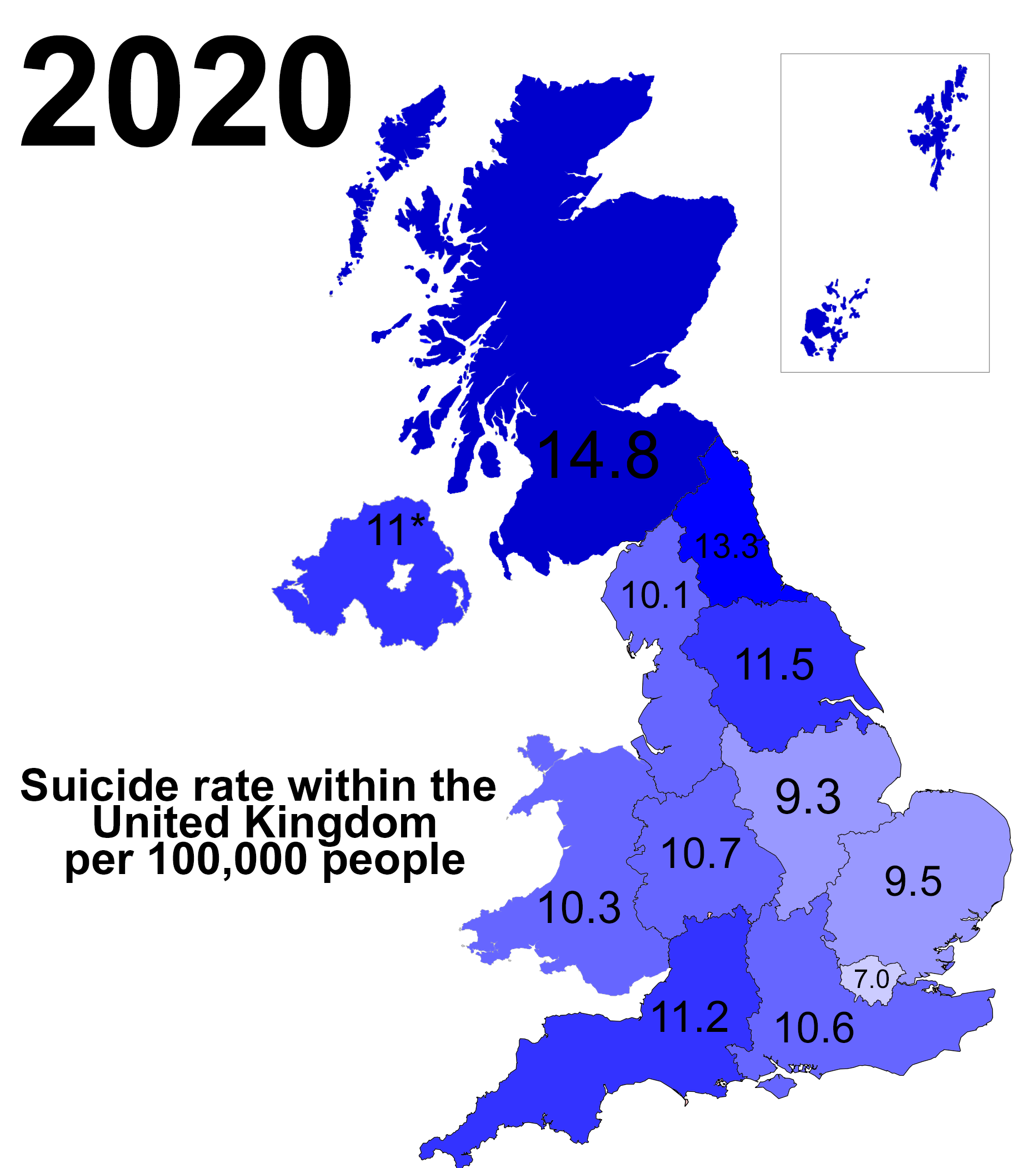
UK suicide rates by region, 2020

UK drug misuse deaths in England and Wales, 1993–2020

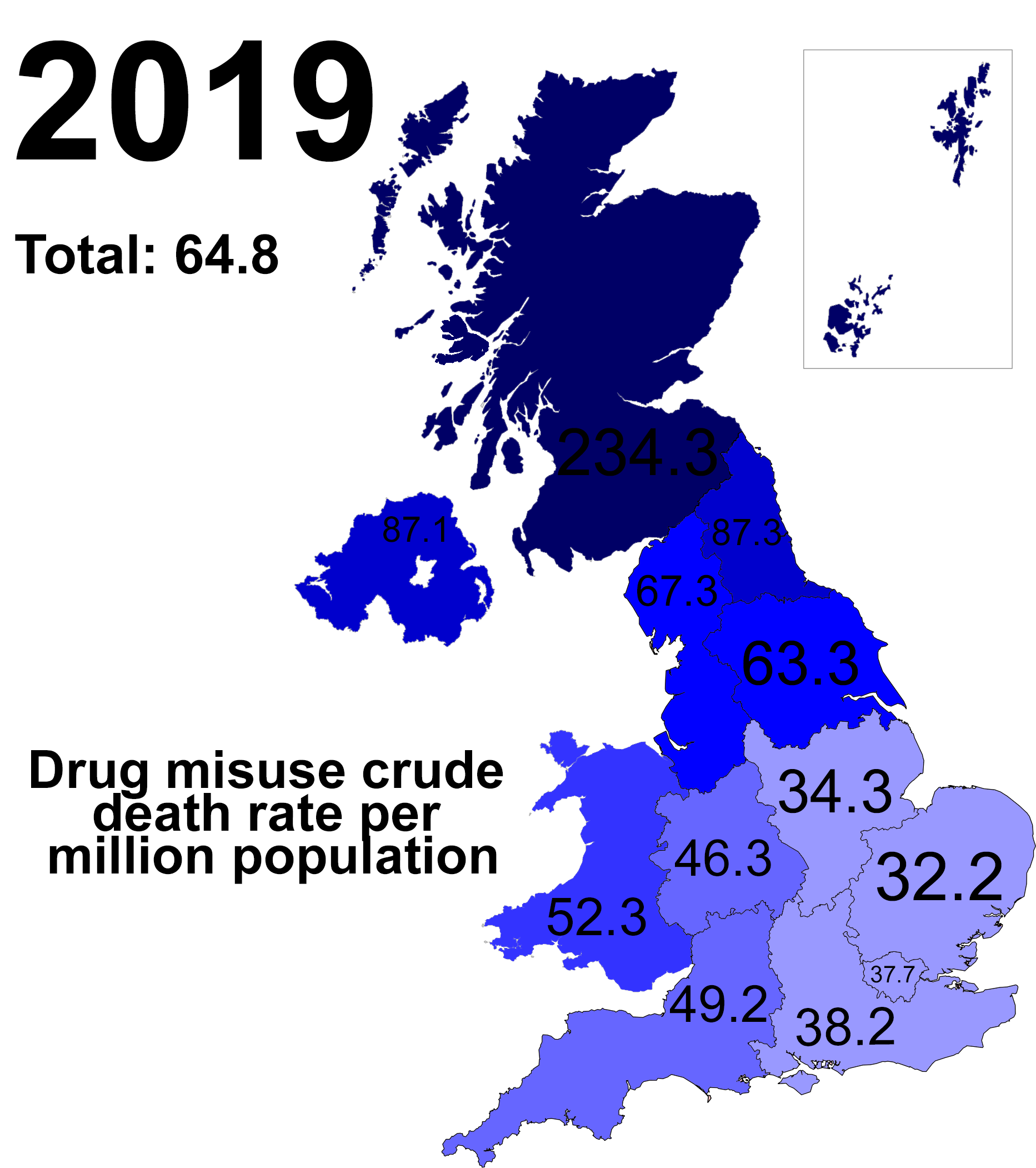
The UK drug misuse crude death rate by region, 2019

==== Disability ====
A population pyramid of the disabled population in England and Wales, 2021

Disability status	England and Wales							
Disability status	1991 (long-term illness)		2001 (limiting long-term illness)		2011		2021	
Disability status	Number	%	Number	%	Number	%	Number	%
Disabled (under the Equality Act)	6,039,455	11.9%	9,484,856	18.2%	10,048,441	17.9%	10,444,776	17.5%
Disabled under the Equality Act: Day-to-day activities limited a little	–	–	–	–	5,278,729	9.4%	5,985,013	10.0%
Disabled under the Equality Act: Day-to-day activities limited a lot	–	–	–	–	4,769,712	8.5%	4,459,763	7.5%
Not disabled (under the Equality Act)	–	–	–	–	46,027,471	82.1%	49,152,766	82.5%
Not disabled under the Equality Act: No long term physical or mental health conditions	–	–	–	–	46,027,471	82.1%	45,090,197	75.7%
Not disabled under the Equality Act: Has long term physical or mental health condition but day-to-day activities are not limited	–	–	–	–	–	–	4,062,569	6.8%
Total	50,748,000	100%	52,041,916	100%	56,075,912	100%	59,597,542	100%

== Employment and income ==
In 2019, the unemployment rate for the youth aged 15–24 was 11.2%. It was 13% for males and 9.2% for females.

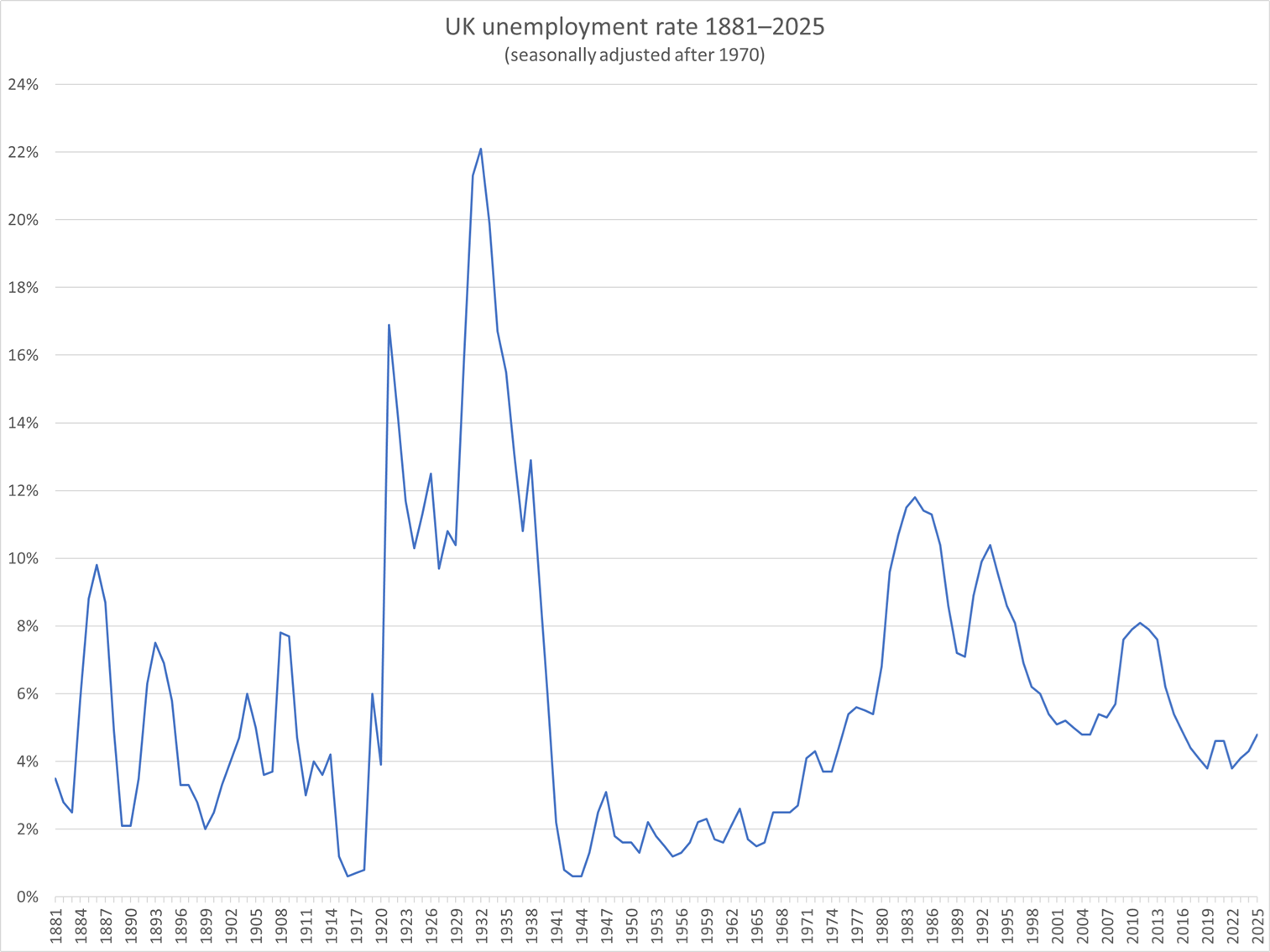
The unemployment rate, 1881–2017

The percentage of the labour force working in each broad sector, 1841–2011

UK employment by broad industry sector, 2020

UK employment by public or private sector, 2021

Average weekly earnings over time, seasonally adjusted, 2000–2021

Average household income 1977–2021

The percentage of young people who are not in education, employment or training (NEET), 2012–2022

The economically inactive percentage of the population, by local authority area, 2021

A map of gross disposable household income (GDHI) across the UK, 2020

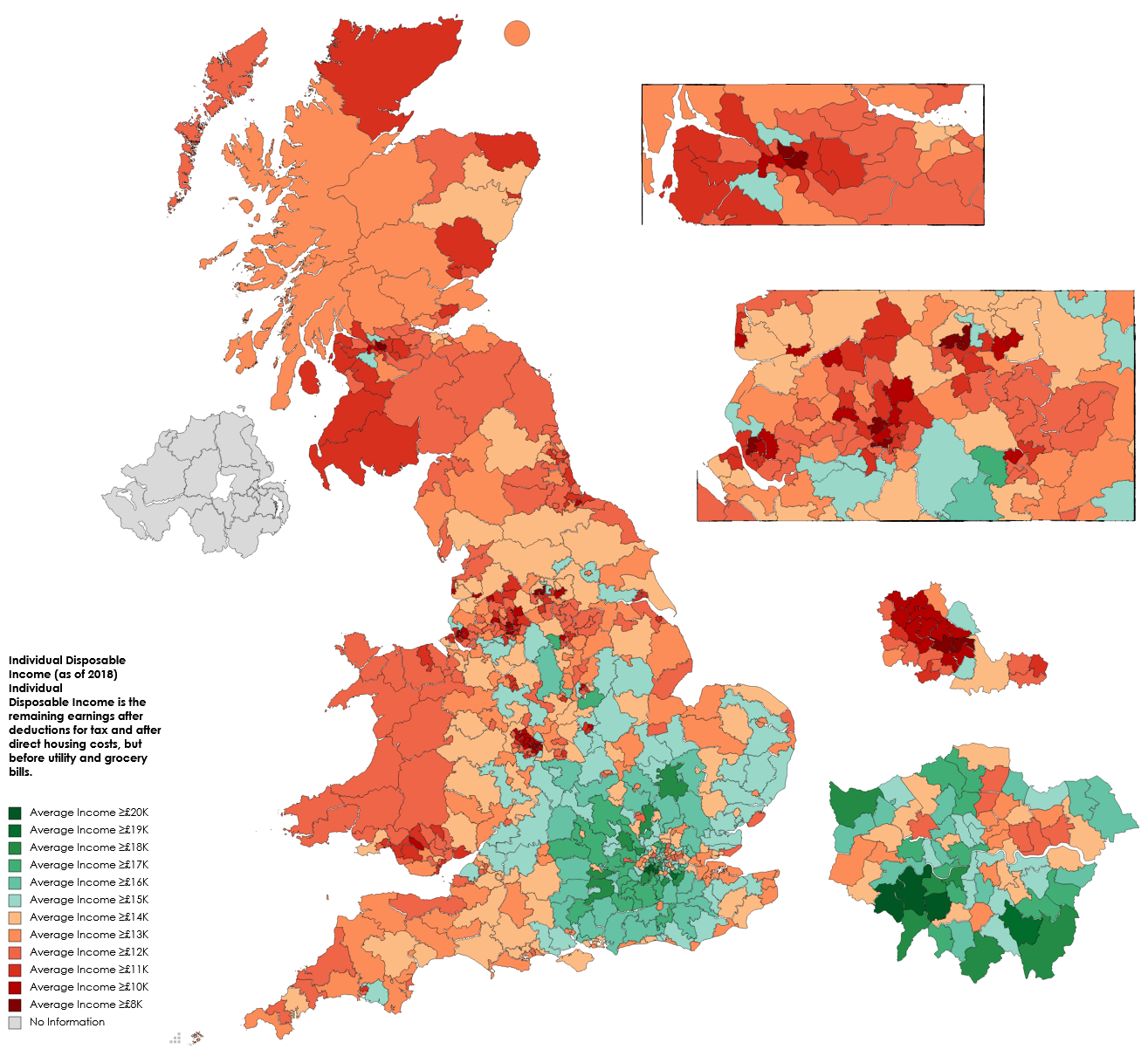
A map of Median Individual Disposable income, 2018

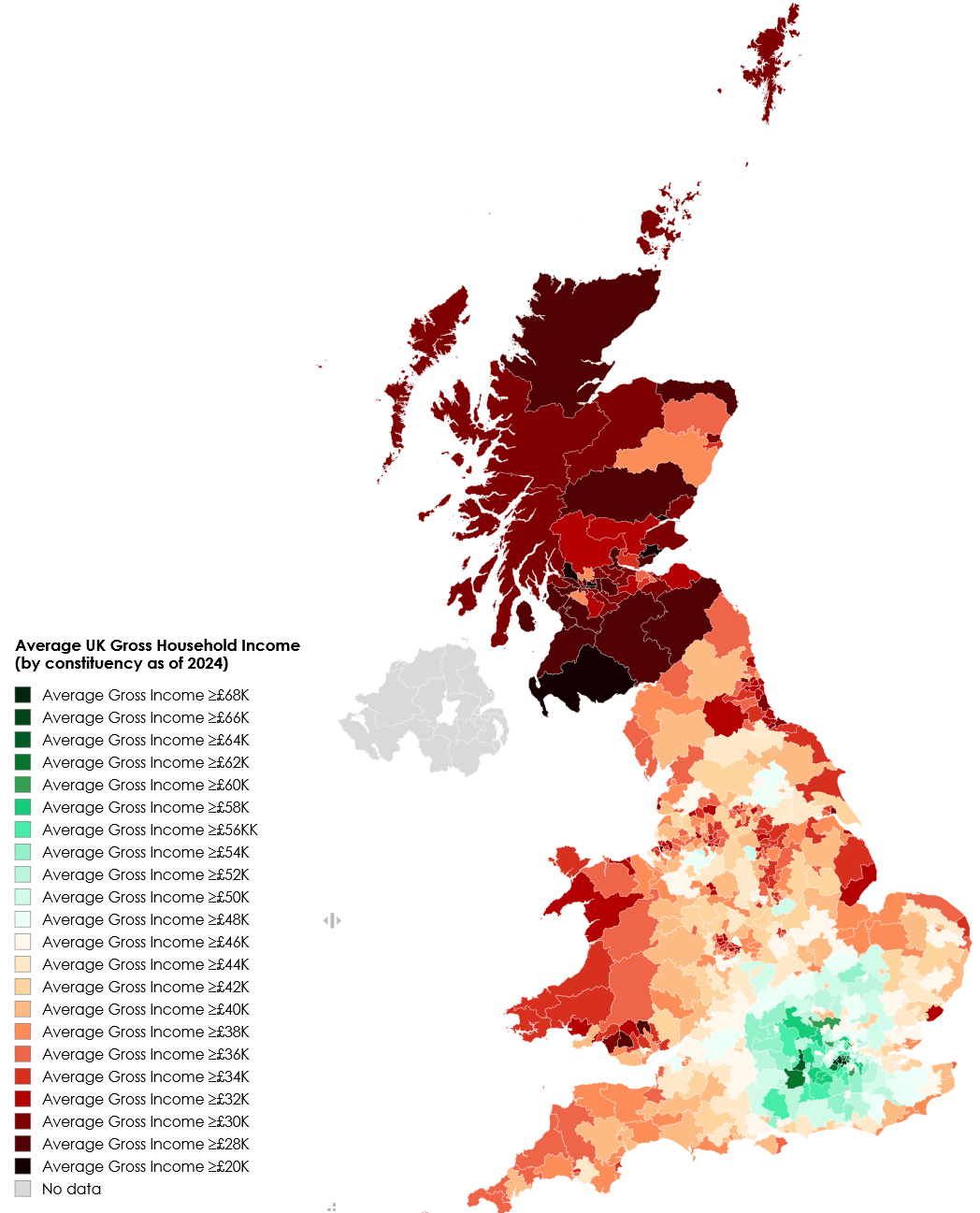
A map of Median Gross Household Income, 2018

=== Method of transportation to work ===
Method of transportation	England and Wales (aged 16 and over in employment)									
Method of transportation	1981 (10% sample)		1991 (10% sample)		2001		2011		2021	
Method of transportation	Number	%	Number	%	Number	%	Number	%	Number	%
Work mainly at or from home	77,711	3.7%	105,715	4.9%	2,170,547	9.2%	1,422,708	5.4%	8,671,722	31.2%
Underground, metro, light rail, tram	42,717	2.1%	–	–	706,477	3.0%	1,028,800	3.9%	505,311	1.8%
Train	80,751	3.9%	129,325	6.1%	957,713	4.1%	1,371,025	5.2%	529,461	1.9%
Bus, minibus or coach	315,767	15.2%	196,554	9.2%	1,742,300	7.4%	1,949,442	7.3%	1,160,990	4.2%
Taxi	–	–	–	–	121,380	0.5%	137,988	0.5%	200,490	0.7%
Motorcycle, scooter or moped	61,244	2.9%	32,828	1.5%	257,474	1.1%	214,244	0.8%	128,849	0.5%
Driving a car or van	806,735	38.8%	1,148,863	53.7%	13,012,850	55.3%	15,264,527	57.5%	12,524,571	45.1%
Passenger in a car or van	248,400	12.0%	159,317	7.5%	1,472,576	6.3%	1,357,280	5.1%	1,083,447	3.9%
Bicycle	80,084	3.9%	66,739	3.1%	648,433	2.8%	762,334	2.9%	569,295	2.0%
On foot	318,606	15.3%	247,987	11.6%	2,352,386	10.0%	2,846,588	10.7%	2,113,657	7.6%
Other method of travel to work (and Not stated)	47,482	2.3%	50,517	2.4%	86,916	0.4%	171,400	0.6%	285,873	1.0%
Total	2,079,497	100%	2,137,845	100%	23,529,052	100%	26,526,336	100%	27,773,666	100%

Population pyramids of Method of transportation to work groups in 2021

Drive car to work

Work from or at home

== Migration ==
Migration to the United Kingdom from 1970 to 2021

The Foreign-born population of England and Wales, 1851 to 2021

The foreign-born and UK born population pyramid from 1981 to 2021 in England and Wales

The percentage born to foreign-born mothers in England and Wales, 1969 to 2021

=== Historical and present net numbers ===
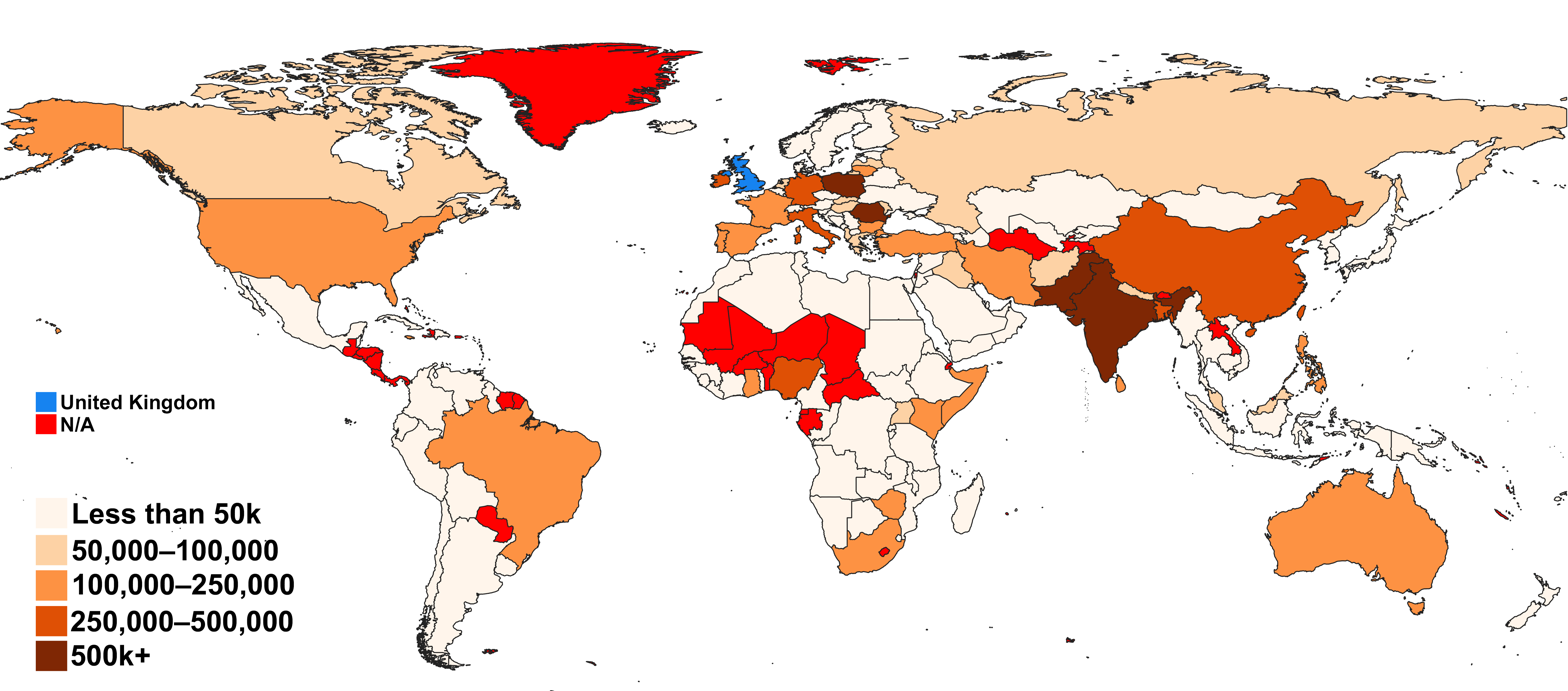
A map of the country of birth of England and Wales' foreign-born population in 2021

Migration to the UK has varied through its history. Irish migration from the Great Famine predominated during the 19th century. Additionally Jewish migration from Russia also arrived famously into Bethnal Green in London.

Starting from the 1950s onwards, following on from the British Nationality Act 1948, which de jure allowed the migration of upwards 800,000,000 British subjects who were now British citizens in law, modern mass migration to the United Kingdom began. In the 1950s, West Indians from the Caribbean, Jamaica, St Vincent and the Grenadines, and Dominica began to arrive.

In the middle of the 1960s to the 1970s, the majority of those arriving were of South Asian origin from the Indian sub-continent. Immigration restrictions, in response to the ever increasing number arriving, were introduced, such as the Commonwealth Immigrants Act 1962, Commonwealth Immigrants Act 1968 and the Immigration Act 1971.

In the 1970s, 1980s and early 1990s, net migration to the United Kingdom was often negative in terms of numbers, with more people leaving the country, than entering.

Since 1994, net migration in numbers has been in the positives, with more people entering the country, rather than leaving. Migration increased fourfold following the election of Tony Blair in 1997. Immigration restrictions were undone, such as the primary purpose rule.

In 2004, along with Ireland and Sweden, Britain was one of the only countries within the EU to not implement 'transitional controls' on migration flows from the newly joined A8 countries from Eastern Europe. Around 453,000 immigrants, which has been revised upwards in recent years, from these new counties were estimated in 2015 to have migrated to the UK.

=== United Kingdom migration data ===
UK Immigration Data (YE June 2012 – present)
Period	Non-EU	EU	British	Total Long-Term Immigration
YE Jun 2012	238,000	327,000	74,000	639,000
YE Sep 2012	232,000	322,000	76,000	630,000
YE Dec 2012	230,000	334,000	79,000	643,000
YE Mar 2013	224,000	350,000	75,000	649,000
YE Jun 2013	222,000	373,000	75,000	669,000
YE Sep 2013	233,000	410,000	78,000	720,000
YE Dec 2013	234,000	402,000	76,000	713,000
YE Mar 2014	236,000	414,000	80,000	731,000
YE Jun 2014	236,000	420,000	82,000	737,000
YE Sep 2014	239,000	441,000	81,000	761,000
YE Dec 2014	241,000	457,000	81,000	778,000
YE Mar 2015	240,000	457,000	83,000	780,000
YE Jun 2015	241,000	454,000	83,000	778,000
YE Sep 2015	240,000	453,000	81,000	774,000
YE Dec 2015	238,000	481,000	78,000	797,000
YE Mar 2016	235,000	490,000	78,000	803,000
YE Jun 2016	237,000	521,000	74,000	832,000
YE Sep 2016	238,000	496,000	70,000	804,000
YE Dec 2016	237,000	465,000	70,000	772,000
YE Mar 2017	239,000	447,000	72,000	759,000
YE Jun 2017	241,000	399,000	78,000	718,000
YE Sep 2017	251,000	425,000	78,000	754,000
YE Dec 2017	257,000	411,000	84,000	752,000
YE Mar 2018	261,000	399,000	76,000	736,000
YE Jun 2018	269,000	407,000	81,000	757,000
YE Sep 2018	284,000	397,000	85,000	766,000
YE Dec 2018	330,000	421,000	74,000	825,000
YE Mar 2019	346,000	429,000	74,000	849,000
YE Jun 2019	347,000	413,000	61,000	821,000
YE Sep 2019	351,000	376,000	66,000	793,000
YE Dec 2019	368,000	349,000	71,000	788,000
YE Mar 2020	388,000	347,000	80,000	815,000
YE Jun 2020	331,000	333,000	72,000	736,000
YE Sep 2020	260,000	293,000	53,000	606,000
YE Dec 2020	294,000	316,000	52,000	662,000
YE Mar 2021	297,000	287,000	44,000	629,000
YE Jun 2021	368,000	279,000	62,000	709,000
YE Sep 2021	534,000	249,000	96,000	878,000
YE Dec 2021	611,000	172,000	108,000	891,000
YE Mar 2022	721,000	138,000	110,000	968,000
YE Jun 2022	848,000	121,000	108,000	1,078,000
YE Sep 2022	984,000	114,000	94,000	1,192,000
YE Dec 2022	1,030,000	116,000	88,000	1,234,000
YE Mar 2023	988,000	128,000	87,000	1,202,000
YE Jun 2023	968,000	129,000	84,000	1,180,000

UK Emigration Data (YE June 2012 – present)
Period	Non-EU	EU	British	Total Long-Term Emigration
YE Jun 2012	181,000	140,000	156,000	477,000
YE Sep 2012	178,000	139,000	156,000	473,000
YE Dec 2012	169,000	128,000	151,000	448,000
YE Mar 2013	164,000	127,000	154,000	446,000
YE Jun 2013	166,000	131,000	157,000	454,000
YE Sep 2013	169,000	135,000	158,000	461,000
YE Dec 2013	171,000	141,000	157,000	469,000
YE Mar 2014	170,000	151,000	154,000	475,000
YE Jun 2014	171,000	161,000	157,000	489,000
YE Sep 2014	166,000	171,000	160,000	497,000
YE Dec 2014	154,000	180,000	161,000	494,000
YE Mar 2015	146,000	182,000	156,000	484,000
YE Jun 2015	141,000	187,000	154,000	482,000
YE Sep 2015	137,000	191,000	153,000	481,000
YE Dec 2015	150,000	193,000	151,000	494,000
YE Mar 2016	155,000	196,000	155,000	506,000
YE Jun 2016	155,000	199,000	157,000	511,000
YE Sep 2016	155,000	202,000	157,000	514,000
YE Dec 2016	147,000	213,000	163,000	523,000
YE Mar 2017	143,000	213,000	163,000	519,000
YE Jun 2017	149,000	212,000	157,000	518,000
YE Sep 2017	152,000	233,000	163,000	549,000
YE Dec 2017	144,000	235,000	164,000	544,000
YE Mar 2018	139,000	240,000	165,000	543,000
YE Jun 2018	127,000	249,000	165,000	541,000
YE Sep 2018	129,000	259,000	152,000	539,000
YE Dec 2018	152,000	250,000	147,000	549,000
YE Mar 2019	155,000	274,000	146,000	575,000
YE Jun 2019	167,000	287,000	143,000	597,000
YE Sep 2019	180,000	262,000	150,000	591,000
YE Dec 2019	182,000	269,000	153,000	605,000
YE Mar 2020	222,000	266,000	157,000	645,000
YE Jun 2020	216,000	263,000	146,000	625,000
YE Sep 2020	199,000	249,000	123,000	571,000
YE Dec 2020	192,000	247,000	130,000	569,000
YE Mar 2021	147,000	226,000	123,000	496,000
YE Jun 2021	142,000	211,000	135,000	488,000
YE Sep 2021	121,000	233,000	82,000	436,000
YE Dec 2021	115,000	234,000	76,000	424,000
YE Mar 2022	118,000	244,000	81,000	443,000
YE Jun 2022	128,000	254,000	89,000	471,000
YE Sep 2022	145,000	249,000	89,000	483,000
YE Dec 2022	157,000	239,000	92,000	489,000
YE Mar 2023	171,000	231,000	96,000	497,000
YE Jun 2023	200,000	215,000	93,000	508,000

UK Net migration data (YE June 2012 – present)
Period	Non-EU	EU	British	Total Long-Term Net Migration
YE Jun 2012	57000	187000	−83000	162000
YE Sep 2012	54000	183000	−80000	157000
YE Dec 2012	61000	206000	−72000	195000
YE Mar 2013	60000	223000	−79000	204000
YE Jun 2013	56000	242000	−83000	215000
YE Sep 2013	64000	275000	−80000	259000
YE Dec 2013	63000	262000	−81000	244000
YE Mar 2014	67000	263000	−74000	256000
YE Jun 2014	65000	258000	−75000	248000
YE Sep 2014	73000	270000	−79000	264000
YE Dec 2014	87000	277000	−80000	284000
YE Mar 2015	94000	275000	−73000	296000
YE Jun 2015	101000	267000	−72000	296000
YE Sep 2015	103000	262000	−72000	293000
YE Dec 2015	88000	287000	−73000	303000
YE Mar 2016	80000	294000	−77000	298000
YE Jun 2016	82000	322000	−83000	321000
YE Sep 2016	83000	294000	−87000	290000
YE Dec 2016	90000	253000	−94000	249000
YE Mar 2017	97000	235000	−91000	240000
YE Jun 2017	91000	188000	−79000	200000
YE Sep 2017	98000	192000	−85000	205000
YE Dec 2017	114000	176000	−81000	208000
YE Mar 2018	122000	160000	−89000	193000
YE Jun 2018	143000	158000	−84000	216000
YE Sep 2018	155000	138000	−67000	226000
YE Dec 2018	178000	170000	−72000	276000
YE Mar 2019	190000	155000	−72000	274000
YE Jun 2019	179000	126000	−82000	224000
YE Sep 2019	171000	114000	−83000	202000
YE Dec 2019	186000	80000	−82000	184000
YE Mar 2020	166000	81000	−77000	170000
YE Jun 2020	115000	70000	−74000	111000
YE Sep 2020	60000	45000	−70000	35000
YE Dec 2020	101000	70000	−78000	93000
YE Mar 2021	150000	61000	−79000	132000
YE Jun 2021	226000	68000	−73000	221000
YE Sep 2021	413000	16000	14000	443000
YE Dec 2021	496000	−62000	32000	466000
YE Mar 2022	603000	−106000	29000	526000
YE Jun 2022	720000	−133000	20000	607000
YE Sep 2022	839000	135000	6000	709000
YE Dec 2022	873000	−123000	−4000	745000
YE Mar 2023	817000	−102000	−9000	705000
YE Jun 2023	768000	−86000	−10000	672000

=== Country of birth ===
Country of birth was first asked as a census question in 1841.

Rank	Country of birth	Population
1	India	863,000
2	Poland	818,000
3	Pakistan	547,000
4	Romania	427,000
5	Ireland	360,000
6	Germany	289,000
7	Bangladesh	260,000
8	South Africa	252,000
9	Italy	233,000
10	China	217,000
11	Nigeria	215,000
12	France	185,000
13	Lithuania	168,000
14	Portugal	165,000
15	United States	161,000
16	Spain	159,000
17	Australia	153,000
18	Philippines	153,000
19	Zimbabwe	128,000
20	Bulgaria	128,000
21	Sri Lanka	126,000
22	Jamaica	123,000
23	Kenya	121,000
24	Ghana	114,000
25	Brazil	101,000
26	Somalia	99,000
27	Hungary	98,000
28	Canada	95,000
29	Latvia	89,000
30	Afghanistan	79,000
31	Nepal	76,000
32	Iran	72,000
33	Slovakia	72,000
34	Turkey	71,000
35	Netherlands	68,000
36	Iraq	67,000
37	New Zealand	67,000
38	Greece	66,000
39	Malaysia	61,000
40	Russia	59,000
41	Cyprus	57,000
42	Thailand	54,000
43	Uganda	52,000
44	Taiwan	49,000
45	Syria	48,000
46	Albania	47,000
47	Singapore	44,000
48	Czech Republic	44,000
49	Sweden	42,000
50	Egypt	39,000
51	Japan	39,000
52	Ukraine	38,000
53	Colombia	38,000
54	Belgium	35,000
55	Mauritius	34,000
56	Saudi Arabia	33,000
57	Sudan	33,000
58	Kosovo	29,000
59	Zambia	29,000
60	Malta	27,000
61	Vietnam	27,000

In the 1980s to 1990s, around 12 to 13% of births were born to foreign-born mothers. In 2004, 20% of births were born to foreign-born mothers. In 2020, the fertility rate of non-UK born women was 1.98. The fertility rate was 1.50 amongst UK born women.

Country of birth from 1951 to 2011
Country of birth	Year													
Country of birth	1951		1961		1971		1981		1991		2001		2011	
Country of birth	Number	%	Number	%	Number	%	Number	%	Number	%	Number	%	Number	%
Europe	–	–	–	–	52,325,821	96.71%	52,939,273	96.13%	53,960,525	95.57%	–	–		
United Kingdom	48,168,300	95.8%	50,233,900	95.1%	51,016,100	94.29%	51,706,978	93.89%	52,659,965	93.27%	54,216,400	91.7%	55,188,698	87.34%
Other Europe	–	–	–	–	1,309,721	2.4%	1,232,295,	2.2%	1,300,560	2.3%				
Republic of Ireland	–	–	–	–	693,435	1.28%	607,428	1.10%	627,930	1.11%				
Other EEC/EU	–	–	–	–	–	–	–	–	497,985	0.88%				
Other Europe	–	–	–	–	616,286	1.13%	624,867	1.13%	174,645	0.30%				
Asia	–	–	–	–	547,340	1.01%	765,383	1.38%	925,725	1.63%	–	–		
Republic of India	–	–	–	–	313,630	0.57%	391,874	0.71%	410,008	0.72%				
Republic of Pakistan	–	–	–	–	137,112	0.25%	188,198	0.34%	234,312	0.41%				
Republic of Bangladesh	–	–	–	–	–	–	48,517	–	105,066	0.18%				
China	–	–	–	–	–	–	–	–	23,998	–				
Other Asia	–	–	–	–	96,598	0.17%	136,794	0.24%	152,341	0.26%				
Africa	–	–	–	–	155,738	0.28%	290,453	0.52%	332,195	0.58%	–	–		
East Africa	–	–	–	–	–	–	–	–	221,170	0.39%				
Other Africa	–	–	–	–	–	–	–	–	111,025	0.2%				
Caribbean and Americas	–	–	–	–	296,347	0.54%	295,179	0.53%	264,781	0.46%	–	–		
Old Commonwealth	–	–	–	–	136,148	0.25%	152,747	0.27%	180,828	0.32%	–	–		
Other (New Commonwealth)	–	–	–	–	114,521	0.21%	162,358	0.29%	194,647	0.34%	–	–		
Other: Total	–	–	–	–	526,587	0.97%	461,410	0.83%	600,065	1.06%	–	–		
Foreign-born: Total	2,118,600	4.2%	2,573,500	4.9%	3,190,300	5.8%	3,429,100	6.2%	3,835,400	6.7%	4,896,600	8.3%	7,993,480	12.7%
Total:	50,286,900	100%	52,807,400	100%	54,102,502	100%	55,066,803	100%	56,458,766	100%	59,113,000	100%	63,182,178	100%

TFR by country of birth (Note: This table has been suggested by the author of the study that it can be correlated with the table on TFR's on different ethnic groups, see below section for said table) (Note: Discontinuity in estimates from 1993 to 1996. This increase in total fertility arises from a re-basing of the population estimates for ethnic minorities from the results of the 1991 census. These fertility estimates were not published in 1998–2000 and the only years for which estimates are now published are 1991 and 2001.)
Country of birth	Year											
Country of birth	1971	1979	1981	1983	1985	1987	1989	1991	1993	1995	1997	2001
United Kingdom	2.30	–	1.70	1.70	1.70	1.80	1.80	1.80	1.70	1.70	1.65	1.6
New Commonwealth	4.00	3.50	2.90	2.80	2.90	2.80	2.70	2.90	2.80	2.96	3.09	2.8
India	4.30	3.90	3.10	2.80	2.90	2.70	2.40	2.60	2.20	2.19	2.32	2.3
Pakistan, Bangladesh	9.30	7.10	6.50	6.10	5.60	5.20	4.70	5.00	5.10	5.20	–	–
Pakistan	–	–	–	–	–	–	–	4.8	–	–	5.30	4.7
Bangladesh	–	–	–	–	–	–	–	3.9	–	–	4.83	3.9
East Africa	2.7	–	2.1	2	2.1	1	1.9	2	1.7	1.8	1.76	1.6
Other Africa	4.2	–	3.4	3.1	3	3.2	4.2	3.1	3.1	3.58	3.52	2.0
West Indies	3.4	2.5	2	1.8	1.8	1.9	1.6	1.9	1.8	2.33	2.57	–
Mediterranean	–	–	2.1	2.1	2.2	2	1.9	2.1	1.7	1.89	1.8	–
Hong Kong, Far East	2.70	–	1.7	1.9	2	1.8	1.7	1.8	1.6	1.6	1.39	–
Other New Commonwealth	–	–	2.3	2.4	2.3	2.5	2.4	2.2	2	2.63	2.94	2.2
Rest of the World	–	–	2.00	1.90	2.00	1.90	1.90	1.90	1.90	2.04	2.09	1.8
Total:	2.38	1.84	1.80	1.76	1.78	1.81	1.80	1.82	1.77	1.72	1.73	1.65

Population groups by country of birth distributed in 2011 (if not noted)

Foreign-born population in the UK in 2021

Born in Poland

Born in Lithuania

Born in France

Born in South Africa
Country of birth population pyramids in 2021 in England and Wales

UK born

Foreign-born: Total

Africa born

Middle East and Asia born

Other Europe born

=== Internal migration ===
Population movements within the UK have fluctuated over time. In the 1800s, during the urbanisation of the UK, large amounts of people moved to London and nearby industrial cities. In recent years there has been a general trend of de-urbanisation, as parts of the population have moved back to the countryside. In the 2000s, 220,000 White British Londoners left London, and moved to other areas of England and Wales. In the 2010s, around 550,000 people left London. By age group, those leaving London tend to be in their 30s and 40s. People entering London tend to be in their 20s.

== Ethnicity ==
=== Ethnic demographic breakdown ===
The ethnic demography of the United Kingdom, 1951 to 2021/2022

Ethnicity in the United Kingdom, 1981 to 2021
Ethnic group	1981 estimates		1991 census (Note: For 1991, Only data from Great Britain itself has been used, due to Northern Ireland not conducting an question on ethnicity within there. If Northern Ireland population data was added in as substitute as the jurisdiction had virtually no ethnic minorities during that period, the White population would rise to 94.65% of the population.)		2001 census		2011 census		2021/2022 census (Note: In 2021 and 2022, Scotland held its census a year later after England, Wales and Northern Ireland due to the COVID-19 pandemic. As a result, the data shown is from two separate years.)	
Ethnic group	Number	%	Number	%	Number	%	Number	%	Number	%
White: Total	52,609,977	96%	53,062,288	94.5%	54,153,898	92.1%	55,073,145	87.2%	55,592,837	83.0%
White: British	–	–	–	–	52,728,717	89.7%	52,320,080	82.8%	51,406,667	76.8%
White: Irish	–	–	837,464	1.5%	52,728,717	89.7%	52,320,080	82.8%	51,406,667	76.8%
White: Gypsy / Traveller / Irish Traveller	–	–	–	–	1,710	–	62,981	0.1%	73,721	0.1%
White: Roma	–	–	–	–	–	–	–	–	102,510	0.1%
White: Other	–	–	–	–	1,423,471	2.4%	2,690,084	4.3%	4,009,940	6.0%
Asian / Asian British: Total	1,282,062	2.4%	1,911,922	3.5%	2,578,826	4.4%	4,373,661	6.9%	5,758,104	8.6%
Asian / Asian British: Indian	627,842	1.2%	876,997	1.6%	1,053,411	1.79%	1,452,156	2.3%	1,927,150	2.9%
Asian / Asian British: Pakistani	344,529	0.6%	500,295	0.9%	747,285	1.27%	1,174,602	1.9%	1,662,286	2.5%
Asian / Asian British: Bangladeshi	87,762	0.2%	171,516	0.3%	283,063	0.48%	451,529	0.7%	652,535	1.0%
Asian / Asian British: Chinese	111,488	0.2%	160,806	0.3%	247,403	0.42%	433,150	0.7%	502,216	0.8%
Asian / Asian British: Other	110,441	0.2%	202,308	0.4%	247,664	0.42%	862,224	1.4%	1,013,917	1.5%
Black / Black British: Total (Note: For the purpose of harmonising results to make them comparable across the UK, the ONS includes individuals in Scotland who classified themselves in the "African" category (29,638 people), which in the Scottish version of the census is separate from "Caribbean or Black" (6,540 people), in this "Black or Black British" category. The ONS note that "the African categories used in Scotland could potentially capture White/Asian/Other African in addition to Black identities".)	707,675	1.3%	929,633	1.7%	1,148,738	2%	1,905,506	3%	2,485,724	3.7%
Black / Black British: African	141,385	0.3%	219,169	0.4%	485,277	0.87%	1,021,973	1.6%	1,555,086	2.4%
Black / Black British: Caribbean	422,522	0.8%	522,242	0.9%	565,876	0.96%	599,197	0.9%	629,897	0.9%
Black / Black British: Other	143,768	0.3%	188,222	0.4%	97,585	0.17%	284,336	0.5%	300,741	0.4%
Mixed / British Mixed	–	–	–	–	677,117	1.2%	1,250,414	2%	1,793,257	2.7%
Other: Total	214,001	0.4%	302,199	0.5%	230,615	0.4%	580,049	0.9%	1,310,636	2.0%
Total:	54,813,715	100%	56,206,042	100%	58,789,194	100%	63,182,775	100%	66,940,563	100%

Note:

Ethnicities of United Kingdom and in its constituent countries

England

Wales

Scotland

Northern Ireland

Estimates and census figures of the growth of the ethnic minority population in the United Kingdom. (Note: Ethnic minority population has been defined historically in different terms but refers to individuals who are 'non-white'. Starred years are estimates of the total population of ethnic minorities in the country while non-starred are census year figures.)
	Number	Percentage
1939*	7,000	—N/a
1951*	50,000	0.1%
1961*	400,000	0.8%
1971*	1,370,000	2.5%
1981*	2,090,000	3.9%
1986*	2,470,000	4.5%
1991	3,015,050	5.5%
1993*	3,200,000	5.7%
1998*	3,700,000	6.5%
2000*	4,040,000	7.1%
2001	4,635,296	7.88%
2011	8,108,626	12.83%
2021/2022	11,347,726	16.95%

Geographic distribution

The distribution of ethnic groups in the United Kingdom in the 2011 census

White: Total (87.12%)

White: British (81.5%) (Note: Percentage for Great Britain, not the entirety of the United Kingdom)

White: Irish (0.95%)

Asian/Asian British: Total (6.92%)

Asian/Asian British: Indian (2.3%)

Asian/Asian British: Pakistani (1.86%)

Asian/Asian British: Bangladeshi (0.71%)

Asian/Asian British: Chinese (0.69%)

Asian/Asian British: Other Asian (1.36%)

Black/Black British: Total (3.01%)

Black/Black British: Caribbean (0.94%)

Other: Arab (0.40%)

Age structure of ethnic groups

A population pyramid of England and Wales by ethnicity, 2021

The ethnic composition by age group in England and Wales, 1991 to 2021

Age structure of ethnic groups in England and Wales in the 2021 census

White: Total

White British

White Irish

Other White

Ethnic minority: Total

Asian/Asian British: Total

Asian/Asian British: Indian

Asian/Asian British: Pakistani

Asian/Asian British: Bangladeshi

Asian/Asian British: Chinese

Other Asian

Black: Total

Black/Black British: Caribbean

Black/Black British: African

Other Black

Mixed/British Mixed: Total

Other ethnic group: Total

Other: Any other ethnic group

Other: Arab

Ethnicity of school pupils

The ethnicity of school pupils in Great Britain, 2004-2021

Ethnicity of school pupils in Great Britain
Ethnic group	School year											
Ethnic group	1967		2004		2008		2012		2016		2021	
Ethnic group	Number	%	Number	%	Number	%	Number	%	Number	%	Number	%
White: Total	–	–	6,648,681	84.2%	6,406,400	82.9%	6,204,628	80.3%	6,245,235	77.8%	7,001,982	73.5%
White: British	–	–	6,468,459	82%	6,132,309	79.4%	5,867,768	75.9%	5,763,533	71.8%	6,313,543	66.3%
White: Irish	–	–	26,100	0.3%	23,620	0.3%	21,805	0.3%	21,127	0.3%	22,994	0.2%
White: Roma/Irish Traveller	–	–	6,500	–	13,295	0.2%	21,308	0.3%	29,184	0.4%	36,845	0.4%
White: Other	–	–	147,622	1.9%	237,176	3.1%	293,747	3.8%	431,391	5.4%	628,600	6.6%
Asian / Asian British: Total	–	–	491,953	6.2%	587,288	7.6%	685,135	8.9%	792,382	9.9%	1,083,920	11.4%
Asian / Asian British: Indian	–	–	156,563	2%	165,320	2.1%	175,964	2.3%	203,785	2.5%	299,136	3.1%
Asian / Asian British: Pakistani	–	–	189,283	2.4%	226,285	2.9%	267,230	3.5%	309,078	3.8%	398,789	4.2%
Asian / Asian British: Bangladeshi	–	–	72,473	0.9%	90,161	1.2%	106,800	1.4%	121,100	1.5%	156,301	1.64%
Asian / Asian British: Chinese	–	–	25,902	0.3%	27,893	0.4%	28,766	0.4%	33,342	0.4%	53,318	0.55%
Asian / Asian British: Other	–	–	47,732	0.6%	77,629	1%	106,375	1.4%	125,077	1.6%	176,376	1.85%
Black / Black British: Total	–	–	247,024	3.1%	298,391	3.9%	348,918	4.5%	400,528	5%	502,344	5.2%
Black: Caribbean	–	–	96,695	1.22%	92,876	1.2%	92,076	1.2%	87,057	1.1%	84,024	0.88%
Black: African	–	–	122,429	1.55%	172,400	2.2%	215,812	2.8%	263,079	3.3%	352,285	3.7%
Black: Other	–	–	27,900	0.35%	33,115	0.4%	41,030	0.5%	50,392	0.6%	66,035	0.69%
Mixed / British Mixed	–	–	186,314	2.4%	242,511	3.1%	305,936	4%	382,730	4.8%	583,723	6.1%
Other: Total	–	–	82,280	1%	84,095	1.1%	104,187	1.3%	129,536	1.6%	199,770	2.1%
Unclassified	–	–	230,573	2.9%	104,012	1.3%	77,862	1%	81,146	1%	153,499	1.6%
Non-White: Total	144,000	–	1,007,571	15.8%	1,212,285		1,444,176		1,705,176		2,369,757	26.5%
Total:	–	100%	7,891,306	100%	7,723,472	100%	7,726,651	100%	8,031,557	100%	9,526,070	100%

A map of the ethnicity of school pupils in England in 2021/2022

White: 71.4%

White British: 63.9%

Ethnicity of live births and total fertility rate

Ethnicity of live births in England and Wales
Ethnic Group
Ethnic Group	2005		2011		2015		2019		2023		2025	
Ethnic Group	Number	%	Number	%	Number	%	Number	%	Number	%	Number	%
White: Total	451,514	69.5% (80.3%)	536,021	74.49%	507,829	72.29%	452,248	70.67%	391,558	66.02%	366,839	62.75%
White: British	418,052	64.4% (75.2% (Note: Report states that births in which no ethnicity was stated were usually White British. If assumptions about all non-stated births are actually White British, the percentage of the group rises to 75.2% of births in 2005 and 80.3% White overall.))	476,328	66.19%	432,114	62.05%	374,056	58.45%	328,247	55.34%	310,456	53.11%
White: Other	33,462	5.1%	59,693	8.29%	75,715	10.87%	78,192	12.22%	63,311	10.67%	56,383	9.64%
Asian / Asian British: Total	56,065	8.7%	76,599	10.64%	76,976	11.05%	73,874	11.54%	86,126	14.52%	103,675	17.73%
Asian / Asian British: Indian	16,053	2.5%	22,725	3.15%	21,582	3.09%	20,627	3.22%	27,908	4.70%	33,016	5.65%
Asian / Asian British: Pakistani	24,290	3.7%	27,948	3.88%	28,142	4.04%	27,573	4.31%	28.686	4.84%	33,589	5.74%
Asian / Asian British: Bangladeshi	8,241	1.3%	9,847	1.36%	9,889	1.42%	9,505	1.49%	10,999	1.85%	13,438	2.30%
Asian / Asian British: Other	7,481	1.2%	16,079	2.23%	17,363	2.49%	16,169	2.52%	18,533	3.12%	23,632	4.04%
Black / Black British: Total	32,701	5%	36,151	5.02%	33,461	4.8%	30,846	4.81%	37,184	6.27%	42,526	7.27%
Black: African	19,756	3%	24,457	3.39%	23,483	3.37%	21,589	3.37%	28,183	4.75%	33,233	5.68%
Black: Caribbean	7,517	1.2%	6,943	0.96%	5,964	0.85%	5,480	0.86%	4,932	0.83%	4,462	0.76%
Black: Other	5,428	0.8%	4,751	0.66%	4,014	0.57%	3,777	0.59%	4,069	0.69%	4,831	0.83%
Mixed / British Mixed	22,606	3.5%	34,643	4.81%	40,433	5.8%	41,918	6.54%	40,345	6.80%	40,883	6.99%
Other: Total	15,232	2.4%	13,320	1.85%	15,625	2.24%	15,523	2.42%	14,904	2.51%	14,995	2.56%
Not Stated	70,303	10.8%	22,848	3.17%	22,041	3.16%	25,578	4.00%	23,012	3.88%	15,671	2.68%
Total:	649,371	100%	719,582	100%	696,365	100%	639,987	100%	593,129	100%	584,589	100%

Percentage of births by ethnic group within the United Kingdom in 2021

White British (62.2%, including non-stated)

=== Future projections ===
Future ethnic projections based on Coleman, 2010

Various studies and projections have been made regarding the future ethnic composition of the United Kingdom.

In 2010, academic David Coleman produced research postulating a future demographic decline of the White British in Britain, indicating that they would become a minority in Birmingham and London during the 2020s. He also estimated that around 2056 to 2066, the trend of a declining share of the white populace will result in the United Kingdom having an overall white minority.

In Prospect, Coleman outlined four projections for a majority-minority scenario within the United Kingdom:

- If net immigration trends (in 2010) continued its overall trend of 254,000 a year, and net emigration of the White British was 74,000 a year (180,000 per year), the White British would decline to 59% of the total population by 2051. 'Other Whites' were projected to be 10% of the population. Non-Whites were projected to be 31% of the population. By 2066, this would inevitably lead to the White British being a minority of the population.
- If migration to the United Kingdom was to decline to a net inflow of 80,000 per year, the White British would be 63% of the population by 2051, and would fall below 50% in 2080.
- Using a cross-party group of MP's recommendation of 'balanced migration', of neither a net inflow or outflow, where immigration only consists of 74,000 a year and emigration of the White British the same, the White British would be 67% of the population by 2051 and then fall below 50% by the end of the century.
- If there is no emigration of citizens and no immigration to the United Kingdom, a 'natural change' scenario, then the White British would remain at around 80% of the population by 2051 and would still remain the majority by the end of the century, albeit a reduced percentage (roughly around 75 – 70%)
- A fifth estimate, made by the Philip Rees and the University of Leeds, estimate that if assumptions about ethnic self-identification are taken into account, and that there is a net outflow of citizens at 38,000 a year, most of which are non-white, and long term net migration like mentioned turns negative, this would result in the White British remaining at around 80% of the population by 2051. 20% of which would be ethnic minorities and 15% of that 20% would be non-white.
Population groupings over time with projections up to 2051 by David Coleman (2010)

White population over time

Ethnic minority population (non-whites)

In June 2025, Matt Goodwin, then a senior visiting fellow at the University of Buckingham, issued a report from the Centre for Heterodox Social Sciences forecasting significant demographic changes over the coming decades. He predicted a decline in the White British portion of the population, from the current 73%, to 44% in 2075, and 33.7% in 2100. Goodwin predicted an increase in the share of the population comprising foreign-born individuals and second-generation immigrants from under 20% in 2025, to 33.5% in 2050. He predicted that by 2100, around 60% of the UK population will either have been born outside the United Kingdom, or have at least one parent who is an immigrant.

It is worth noting that Goodwin has since been accused of using generative AI to back up his claims on immigration. His most recent book, Suicide of a Nation, includes 'falsely attributed quotes,' 'misinterpreted data' and 'made-up statistics.' Of the 12 footnotes in the book, 2 still contained the original ChatGPT source code, and 6 referenced articles that Goodwin himself had written. Goodwin stood as the Reform UK candidate in the 2026 Gorton and Denton by-election and lost to Hannah Spencer of the Green Party of England and Wales.

== Religion ==
Religious affiliation in Great Britain, 1680 to 2018

Non-Christian population percentage growth in England and Wales, 1961 to 2021

The religious makeup of England and Wales in age groups from 2001 to 2021

In 2001, the question of religious adherence was asked for the first time since 1851 in the United Kingdom Census.

The traditional religion in the United Kingdom is Christianity. In England, the established church is the Church of England (Anglican). In Scotland, the Church of Scotland, a Presbyterian Church, is regarded as the 'national church', but there is not an established church.

In Wales there is no established church, with the Church in Wales having been disestablished in 1920. In Ireland, the Church of Ireland was disestablished in 1871. In Northern Ireland and parts of Western Scotland there are lingering sectarian divides between Roman Catholic and Protestant communities.

The table below shows data regarding religion for the 2001, 2011 and 2021/22 censuses:

Religion	2001		2011		2021/2022	
Religion	Number	%	Number	%	Number	%
Christianity	42,079,417	71.58%	37,583,962	59.49%	31,149,224	46.53%
Islam	1,591,126	2.71%	2,786,635	4.41%	3,998,875	5.97%
Hinduism	558,810	0.95%	835,394	1.32%	1,066,894	1.59%
Sikhism	336,149	0.57%	432,429	0.68%	535,517	0.79%
Judaism	266,740	0.45%	269,568	0.43%	277,613	0.41%
Buddhism	151,816	0.26%	261,584	0.41%	289,551	0.43%
Other religion	178,837	0.30%	262,774	0.42%	388,789	0.58%
No religion	13,626,299	23.18%	16,221,509	25.67%	25,273,945	37.75%
Religion not stated	13,626,299	23.18%	4,528,323	7.17%	3,960,980	5.91%
Total population	58,789,194	100.00%	63,182,178	100.00%	66,940,560	100.00%

Religion in the 2011 census

Christians (59.5%)

Population pyramid of England and Wales by religion in 2021

Religious groups population pyramids in England and Wales in 2021

Christian

No Religion

None stated/answered

Muslim

Hindu

Sikh

Buddhist

Jewish

Other Religion

In the 2011 Census, rather than select one of the specified religions offered on the Census form, many people chose to write in their own religion. Some of these religions were reassigned to one of the main religions offered. In England and Wales, 241,000 people belonged to religious groups which did not fall into any of the main religions. The largest of these were Pagans (56,620), Spiritualists (39,061) and Jains (20,288). Despite its high-profile nature, there were only 2,418 Scientologists.

The census recorded 176,632 people stating their religion as Jedi Knight and 6,242 people as Heavy Metal after a campaign by Metal Hammer. These returns were classified as "No religion", along with Atheist, Agnostic, Humanist, and Free Thinker. Those who ticked Heathen, who had been categorised as "no religion" in 2001, were categorised as "other". It is unclear how the ONS treated people who ticked "Other" but did not write in any religion.

In 2012, the British Social Attitudes Survey found the highest number to be non-religious (48%) followed by Christians (46%) with another six per cent identifying otherwise. Discrepancies found between surveys may be the result of differences in phrasing, question order, and data collection method.

=== Future projections ===
The Muslim population in the United Kingdom, currently estimated at 7% of the population, is projected to increase significantly in the coming decades. According to recent demographic forecasts, the proportion of Muslims in the UK is expected to rise to 11.2% within the next 25 years and to 19.2% by the end of the 21st century.

Under a “high Muslim migration scenario”—in which the UK experiences sustained above-average levels of immigration from Muslim-majority countries—the proportion of Muslims in the population could reach 25% by 2100. In this scenario, it is further projected that nearly one in three individuals under the age of 40 could identify as Muslim by the end of the century.

In 2017, Pew Research Center found that by 2050, in all scenarios, the Muslim population of the United Kingdom will rise. Depending on the scenario, the percentage of the population in 2050 which will be Muslim will either be 9.7% in a zero migration scenario, 16.7% in a medium migration scenario or 17.2% in a high migration scenario.

== Languages ==
The United Kingdom's de facto official language is English, which is spoken as a first language by 95% of the population. Six regional languages—Scots, Ulster-Scots, Welsh, Cornish, Irish and Scottish Gaelic—are protected under the European Charter for Regional or Minority Languages. Abilities in these languages, other than Cornish, for those aged three and above were recorded in the 2011 census as follows.

=== Regional languages ===
Ability	2011									
Ability	Wales		Scotland				Northern Ireland			
Ability	Welsh		Scottish Gaelic		Scots		Irish		Ulster-Scots	
Ability	Number	%	Number	%	Number	%	Number	%	Number	%
Understands but does not speak, read or write	157,792	5.15%	23,357	0.46%	267,412	5.22%	70,501	4.06%	92,040	5.30%
Speaks, reads and writes	430,717	14.06%	32,191	0.63%	1,225,622	23.95%	71,996	4.15%	17,228	0.99%
Speaks but does not read or write	80,429	2.63%	18,966	0.37%	179,295	3.50%	24,677	1.42%	10,265	0.59%
Speaks and reads but does not write	45,524	1.49%	6,218	0.12%	132,709	2.59%	7,414	0.43%	7,801	0.45%
Reads but does not speak or write	44,327	1.45%	4,646	0.09%	107,025	2.09%	5,659	0.33%	11,911	0.69%
Other combination of skills	40,692	1.33%	1,678	0.03%	17,381	0.34%	4,651	0.27%	95	0.06%
No skills	2,263,975	73.90%	5,031,167	98.30%	3,188,779	62.30%	1,550,813	89.35%	1,595,507	91.92%
Total	3,063,456	100.00%	5,118,223	100.00%	5,118,223	100.00%	1,735,711	100.00%	1,735,711	100.00%
Can speak	562,016	18.35%	57,602	1.13%	1,541,693	30.12%	104,943	6.05%	35,404	2.04%
Has some ability	799,481	26.10%	87,056	1.70%	1,929,444	37.70%	184,898	10.65%	140,204	8.08%

Cornish is spoken by around 2,500 people. In the 2011 census, 464 respondents aged three and over in Cornwall said that Cornish was their main language, amounting to 0.09% of the population of Cornwall aged three and over.

Distribution of those who stated they could speak a regional language in the 2011 census.
Welsh

Scots

Scottish Gaelic

Irish

Ulster-Scots

After English, Polish was the second most common language given in the United Kingdom census 2011. 618,091 respondents aged three and over said that Polish was their main language, amounting to 1.01% of the population of the United Kingdom aged three and over.

The French language is spoken in some parts of the Channel Islands although the islands, like the Isle of Man, are not part of the United Kingdom. British Sign Language is also common.

=== Proficiency in English ===
Proficiency in English
Language proficiency	England and Wales			
Language proficiency	2011		2021	
Language proficiency	Number	%	Number	%
Main language is English	49,808,185	92.3%	52,569,816	91.1%
Main language is not English	4,153,266	7.7%	5,134,447	8.9%
Can speak English very well	1,722,197	3.2%	2,255,542	3.9%
Can speak English well	1,567,919	2.9%	1,838,559	3.2%
Cannot speak English well	725,639	1.3%	879,782	1.5%
Cannot speak English	137,511	0.3%	160,564	0.3%
Total	53,961,451	100%	57,704,263	100%

== National identity ==
Respondents to the 2011 UK census gave their national identities as follows.

National identity	Years						
National identity	2011					2021	
National identity	United Kingdom	Country				Country	
National identity	United Kingdom	England	Scotland	Wales	N. Ireland	England	Wales
English only	51.41%	60.38%	2.28%	11.22%	0.60%	15.3%	9.1%
Scottish only	5.93%	0.79%	62.43%	0.50%	0.37%	0.4%	0.4%
Welsh only	3.26%	0.55%	0.15%	57.51%	0.06%	0.3%	55.2%
Northern Irish only	0.81%	0.21%	0.33%	0.14%	20.94%	0.1%	0.1%
British only	18.77%	19.19%	8.37%	16.95%	39.89%	56.8%	18.5%
+ English and British only	7.82%	9.09%	1.26%	1.54%	0.27%	14.3%	1.8%
+ Scottish and British only	1.67%	0.15%	18.29%	0.07%	0.09%	0.2%	0.1%
+ Welsh and British only	0.44%	0.11%	0.06%	7.11%	0.02%	0.2%	8.1%
Northern Irish and British only	0.22%	0.03%	0.15%	0.02%	6.17%	0.1%	0.0%
Other combination of UK identities only (excludes Irish)	0.45%	0.37%	1.01%	1.10%	0.13%	0.4%	1.3%
Other identity and at least one UK identity	0.97%	0.90%	1.25%	0.43%	3.05%	1.9%	1.1%
Irish only	1.31%	0.64%	0.41%	0.32%	25.26%	0.5%	0.3%
Other	6.94%	7.59%	4.01%	3.10%	3.12%	9.5%	4%
Total	100%	100%	100%	100%	100%	100%	100%

Identity group population pyramids in England and Wales in 2021

English only

British only

Welsh only

English and British identity

UK and Non-UK identity

Non-UK identity

== Education ==
Personal qualifications in England and Wales in 2021. See description of the file for explanatory notes.

Literacy rates within the United Kingdom, 1475 to 2003

In the present day each country of the United Kingdom has a separate education system, with power over education matters in Scotland, Wales and Northern Ireland being devolved.

Universal state education in England and Wales was introduced for primary level in 1870 and secondary level in 1900. Education is mandatory from the ages of 5 to 18. The majority of children are educated in state-sector schools, only a small proportion of which select on the grounds of academic ability. Despite a fall in actual numbers, the proportion of children in England attending private schools rose slightly from 7.1% to 7.3% between 2004 and 2007.

Scotland first legislated for universal provision of education in 1696. Four per cent of children in Scotland attend private schools, a rate which has remained relatively stable since 2015.

In Wales, one of the most notable distinctive features of education in Wales is the emphasis on the Welsh language – lessons in which are compulsory for all until the age of 16. A significant minority of students (15.7% in the 2014\15 academic year) were taught primarily through the medium of Welsh.

Level of qualification	England and Wales (aged 16 and over, not in education)					
Level of qualification	2001		2011		2021	
Level of qualification	Number	%	Number	%	Number	%
No qualifications	10,937,042	29.1	10,307,327	22.7%	8,827,472	18.2%
Level 1 and entry level qualifications	6,230,033	16.6	6,047,384	13.3%	4,679,223	9.6%
Level 2 qualifications	7,288,074	19.4	6,938,433	15.3%	6,493,490	13.4%
Apprenticeship	–	–	1,631,777	3.6%	2,590,252	5.3%
Level 3 qualifications	3,110,135	8.3	5,617,802	12.3%	8,225,629	16.9%
Level 4 qualifications or above	7,432,962	19.8	12,383,477	27.2%	16,413,231	33.8%
Other qualifications	2,609,192	6.9	2,570,580	5.7%	1,337,076	2.8%
Total	37,607,438	100%	45,496,780	100%	48,566,373	100%

== See also ==
- Demographics of Wales
- Demographics of Northern Ireland
- Demographics of London
- Demographics of Birmingham
- Demographics of Liverpool
- Demographics of Greater Manchester
- Demographics of Tees Valley
- City status in the United Kingdom
- List of cities in the United Kingdom
- List of UK city regions by population
- List of urban areas in the United Kingdom
- Genetic history of the British Isles
