= BeaconLight Trust =

Christian training organisation

- Founded: 1995
- Founder: Paul Adams
- Type: Biblical training provider
- Purpose: Evangelical Christianity
- Location: United Kingdom
- Origins: United Kingdom
- Region served: United Kingdom, Worldwide
- Method: Provides Biblical training resources
- Website: http://www.beaconlight.co.uk/
- Registered Charity number: 1047046

BeaconLight Trust is a non-denominational Christian training organisation that provides biblical training resources. BeaconLight is a registered charity (no. 1047046), a member of Global Connections and the Evangelical Alliance.

== History ==
BeaconLight started in 1995, running face-to-face training courses, predominantly in South-East England. These courses involved participants from approx. 400 churches, and were normally based at Banstead Baptist Church. Since 2007, BeaconLight has offered free-to-use training resources over the internet. In 2009 BeaconLight published its first book, Truth Direct.

== Word@Work ==
In November 2007, BeaconLight began offering a daily devotional email service named Word@Work. The stated aim of this service is to encourage people at work to apply the Bible's teaching to their working lives. Word@Work has garnered praise within the evangelical blogosphere, and its readership has grown to 30,000 readers worldwide (as at April 2011).
