= Toll's Meadow, Wymondham =

Nature reserve in Norfolk, England

Coordinates: 52.567°N 1.113°E

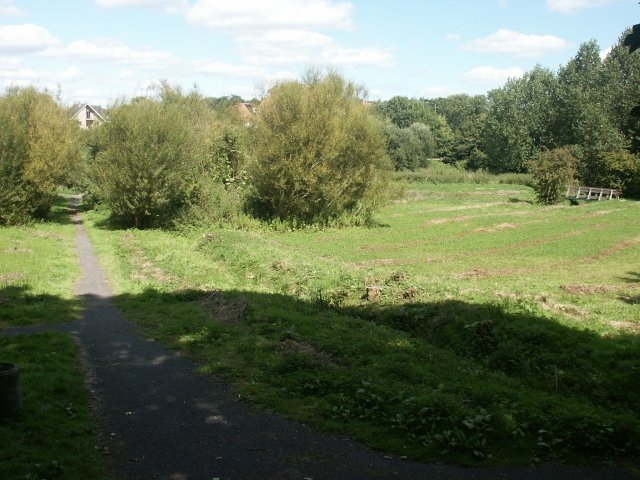
- Interactive map of Toll's Meadow, Wymondham
- Type: Local Nature Reserve
- Location: Wymondham, Norfolk
- OS grid: TG 111 011
- Area: 1.7 hectares (4.2 acres)
- Manager: Wymondham Town Council and Norfolk County Council

Toll's Meadow, Wymondham is a 1.7-hectare (4.2-acre) Local Nature Reserve in Wymondham in Norfolk. It is owned by Wymondham Town Council and managed by Wymondham Town Council and Norfolk County Council.

The River Tiffey runs through this site, which has wet meadow and woodland. There is a variety of small birds and mammals include muntjac and roe deer, bank voles and common shrews.

There is access from Cemetery Lane and from London Road.
