= Culling Eardley =

British evangelist

Sir Culling Eardley Eardley, 3rd Baronet (21 April 1805 – 21 May 1863) was a British Christian campaigner for religious freedom and for the Protestant cause, one of the founders of the Evangelical Alliance. Born Culling Eardley Smith, he was known by that name until 1847.

== Early life ==
Born in London, his father, Sir Culling Smith, 2nd Baronet (1768–1829), was of Huguenot extraction and his mother, Charlotte Elizabeth (d. 15 Sept 1826) was the daughter of Sampson Eardley, 1st Baron Eardley, and hence the granddaughter of Jewish financier Sampson Gideon. Though the title Baron Eardley had not survived, Charlotte Elizabeth was heiress to much of the Eardley estate.

Smith attended Eton College, and matriculated at Oriel College, Oxford in 1823. Though he passed his BA examinations, he never graduated, having become a convinced evangelical Christian. He succeeded to his baronetcy on his father's death in 1829 and married Isabella Carr (died 1 May 1860) in 1832. They had one son, Eardley Gideon Culling Eardley (1838–1875), and two daughters. He inherited Bedwell Park, Hertfordshire from his father. From his cousin William Thomas Eardley-Twisleton-Fiennes, 15th Baron Saye and Sele he inherited Belvedere, Erith, Kent and the Eardley estates in 1847 and changed his name from Smith to Eardley by royal licence.He served as High Sheriff of Lincolnshire in 1838.

== Politics and campaigning ==
An instinctive campaigner with an interest in reform of the poor laws, Eardley was briefly Whig Member of Parliament for Pontefract from 1830 to 1831. Though he stood again, unsuccessfully, in the 1837 general election, his principal driver was his religious faith.

Eardley was raised in the Church of England and despite his subsequent convictions, in particular his condemnation of State religion, remained a member. His beliefs were closely related to Congregationalism, though he never left the Anglican church. In 1839 he became chairman and treasurer of the Evangelical Voluntary Church Association, which campaigned for disestablishment. When the Association was dissolved in 1844, Eardley became chairman of the Anti-Maynooth Committee and Conference which campaigned, without success, against the Maynooth Grant.

In 1845/ 6, with evangelists Ridley Haim Herschell and Edward Steane, he became, one of the founders, and first chairman, of the Evangelical Alliance.

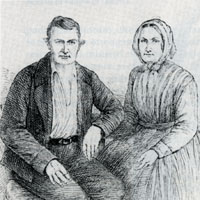
Francesco and Rosa Madiai - sent to jail in Tuscany for being Protestants

He attempted to return to politics to create a platform for his campaigning zeal, fighting Edinburgh in 1846, against Thomas Babington Macaulay who supported Maynooth, and the West Riding of Yorkshire in 1848. However Eardley and the Evangelical Alliance had become interested in campaigning internationally for freedom of religion. In 1852 he campaigned on behalf of the Tuscan prisoners of conscience Francesco Madiai and Rosa Madiai. They had been imprisoned when they announced that they had become Protestants causing such international interest that Lord Palmerston had offered to pay their legal fees.

He established an influential international network that included Giuseppe Garibaldi, Christian Charles Josias Bunsen and Frederick William IV of Prussia. He was treasurer of the London Missionary Society from 1844 to 1863, and of a fund for relief of Lebanese Christians after the 1861 massacres. He worked hard to maintain broad friendly relationships with all creeds and strove to improve relationships between the Church of England and nonconformists. In 1844, he gave financial support to Ridley Haim Herschell's Trinity Chappel in Edgware Road, London.

However, he was a particularly strong supporter of those who felt themselves excluded from the Church of England by the practices of the Anglo Catholics. From 1850 to 1853, he sponsored, and gave financial support, to the construction of an evangelical church at Furrough Cross, Babbacombe, defying Henry Phillpotts Bishop of Exeter. He also built a church on his Erith estate. He was also a prominent supporter of Giacinto Achilli's, ultimately discredited, evangelical campaign in Britain. In July 1854 Eardley was a founder member and chairman of the Turkish Missions Aid Society, an evangelical charity set up to support missionary work among Armenian Christians in Turkey. The charity is known today as Embrace the Middle East.

== Personal life ==
Mostly resident at Bedwell, he lived at Belvedere from 1848 to 1858 and also had a house at Frognel, Torquay in the 1850s. He suffered from poor health in later life and died, aged 58, at Bedwell from an adverse reaction to a smallpox vaccination.

== Bibliography ==
- Eardley, C. E. (1835). Suggestions Addressed, by Permission of the Board, to the Secretary of the Poor Law Commissioners. Roake & Varty.
- Eardley, C. E. (1841). An Englishman's Thoughts on the Scotch Church. W. Tyler.
- Eardley, C. E. (1846a). A Few Words to the Electors of Edinburgh: With a Corrected Report of Some Speeches Delivered During the Late Contest. Roake & Varty.
- Eardley, C. E. (1846b). City Election: Speech of Sir Culling Eardley Smith, Delivered on the Hustings at his Nomination, on Friday, 10th July, 1846. s.n.
- Eardley, C. E. (1849). An Appeal to my Fellow Townsmen in Torquay: And through them to the People of Devonshire and of the Three kingdoms on Behalf of the Rev. James Shore, ..., ... of the Right Rev. The Lord Bishop of Exeter. Partridge & Oakey.
- Eardley, C. E. (1855). Christianity in Turkey: Correspondence of the Governments of Christendom Relating to Executions in Turkey for Apostacy from Islamism. Partridge & Oakey.
- Eardley, C. E. (1856a). The Rights of the Laity in the Universities: A Letter to the Rt. Hon. Lord Monteagle, and a Correspondence with the Rev. Dr. Hawkins, Provost of Oriel College, Oxford, 1854-5. Daniel F. Oakey.
- Eardley, C. E. (1856b). The Rights of the Laity in the Church: A Letter to the Rev. Henry Newland, M.A. James Ridgway.
- Eardley, C. E. (1863). The Spanish prisoners: Our Duties, Encouragements, and Prospects: A Letter to the Earl of Roden. James Nisbet & Co.

Parliament of the United Kingdom
Preceded by Thomas Houldsworth; Le Gendre Starkie	Member of Parliament for Pontefract; 1830–1831; With: Hon. Henry Stafford-Jerningham	Succeeded by Hon. Henry Stafford-Jerningham; The Earl of Mexborough
Honorary titles
Preceded by Sir Thomas Whichcote, Bt	High Sheriff of Lincolnshire; 1838	Succeeded by George Fieschi Heneage
Baronetage of the United Kingdom
Preceded by Culling Smith	Baronet (of Hadley); 1829–1863	Succeeded by Eardley Eardley
