= Charles Stanford =

Charles Stanford may refer to:

- Charles Stanford (minister) (1823–1886), Baptist minister
- Charles Stanford (politician) (1819–1885), New York politician
- Charles Villiers Stanford (1852–1924), Irish composer
