= City Chapel London =

Church in London, England

City Chapel
- Founded: 2008
- Founder: Dr Jonathan and Abbiih Oloyede
- Registration no.: 1128050
- Location: Herbert Road Manor Park E12 6AY
- Method: Various Ministries, Movie Nights, Hospital/Hospice Chaplaincy
- Website: www.citychapel.org.uk

City Chapel London is a church in Manor Park East London.

The church was founded and planted by Dr Jonathan and Abbiih Oloyede, who have over 29years pastoral and ministry experience. It was founded in autumn 2008 in collaboration with friends and regional networks, and was registered with the Charity Commission for England and Wales on 13 February 2009.

In 2010, members of the church started the Newham Foodbank, which is now run by another organisation and trustees totally separate from the church. In 2011 the church registered The East London City Projects.

City Chapel is a member of the Evangelical Alliance.
