= Listed buildings in Wymondham =

Non-Civil Parish in Norfolk, England

Wymondham is a town and civil parish in the South Norfolk district of Norfolk, England. It contains 182 listed buildings that are recorded in the National Heritage List for England. Of these four are grade I, six are grade II* and 172 are grade II.

This list is based on the information retrieved online from Historic England.

== Key ==
Grade	Criteria
I	Buildings that are of exceptional interest
II*	Particularly important buildings of more than special interest
II	Buildings that are of special interest

== Listing ==
Name	Grade	Location	Type	Completed (Note: The date given is the date used by Historic England as significant for the initial building or that of an important part in the structure's description.)	Date designated	Grid ref. (Note: The grid reference is based on the British national grid reference system, sometimes known as OSGB36, used by the Ordnance Survey.) Geo-coordinates	Notes	Entry number (Note: The "List Entry Number" is a unique number assigned to each listed building and scheduled monument by Historic England.)	Image	Wikidata
Ha Ha Approx 500 Metres West of Cavick House	II				15 November 2000	TG1011101259; 52°34′07″N 1°05′56″E		1268413	Upload Photo	Q26558722
Barn to West of Downham Lodge Farmhouse	II	Barnham Broom Road			23 September 2003	TG1015405066; 52°36′10″N 1°06′07″E		1390728	Upload Photo	Q26670109
Downham Lodge Farmhouse	II	Barnham Broom Road			23 September 2003	TG1018705075; 52°36′10″N 1°06′09″E		1390729	Upload Photo	Q26670110
Granary at Downham Lodge Farm	II	Barnham Broom Road			23 September 2003	TG1017905016; 52°36′08″N 1°06′08″E		1096101	Upload Photo	Q26388396
Icehouse 240 Metres South South East of Kimberley House	II	Barnham Broom Road			14 July 1972	TG0915904522; 52°35′54″N 1°05′13″E		1196728	Upload Photo	Q26491242
Kimberley House Including Service Wings to North West and South East	II*	Barnham Broom Road	English country house		29 December 1950	TG0904204748; 52°36′01″N 1°05′07″E		1293198	Kimberley House Including Service Wings to North West and South East More images	Q17532643
Walls to Enclosed Garden 340 Metres South South East of Kimberley House	II	Barnham Broom Road			14 July 1972	TG0906904395; 52°35′50″N 1°05′08″E		1293166	Upload Photo	Q26581124
Precinct Walls to North West of Abbey Church and Attached Gates	II	Becketswell Road			14 July 1972	TG1068101544; 52°34′15″N 1°06′27″E		1297469	Upload Photo	Q26585045
Queen's Head Hotel	II	2, Bridewell Street			29 December 1950	TG1113801454; 52°34′12″N 1°06′51″E		1208449	Upload Photo	Q26503524
3, Bridewell Street	II	3, Bridewell Street			29 December 1950	TG1112501490; 52°34′13″N 1°06′50″E		1208454	Upload Photo	Q26503529
The Manor House	II	4, Bridewell Street			26 January 1995	TG1114801464; 52°34′12″N 1°06′51″E		1272665	Upload Photo	Q26562486
5, Bridewell Street	II	5, Bridewell Street			29 December 1950	TG1113201480; 52°34′13″N 1°06′51″E		1196729	Upload Photo	Q26491243
Duddon House	II	6, Bridewell Street			29 December 1950	TG1116201465; 52°34′12″N 1°06′52″E		1208466	Upload Photo	Q26503541
7, Bridewell Street	II	7, Bridewell Street			29 December 1950	TG1114001482; 52°34′13″N 1°06′51″E		1297470	Upload Photo	Q26585046
9, Bridewell Street	II	9, Bridewell Street			29 December 1950	TG1114401481; 52°34′13″N 1°06′51″E		1208492	Upload Photo	Q26503564
10, Bridewell Street	II	10, Bridewell Street			3 March 1982	TG1116601468; 52°34′12″N 1°06′52″E		1196730	Upload Photo	Q26491244
11-21, Bridewell Street	II	11-21, Bridewell Street			29 December 1950	TG1115401487; 52°34′13″N 1°06′52″E		1208495	Upload Photo	Q26503567
Lyndhurst	II	12, Bridewell Street			14 July 1972	TG1117301470; 52°34′12″N 1°06′53″E		1297471	Upload Photo	Q26585047
14, Bridewell Street	II	14, Bridewell Street			14 July 1972	TG1119201476; 52°34′12″N 1°06′54″E		1293117	Upload Photo	Q26581075
Banham's Farmhouse	II	Browick Road, Browick			14 July 1972	TG1274701140; 52°33′59″N 1°08′16″E		1196731	Upload Photo	Q26491245
Browick Hall	II	Browick Road, NR18 9RB, Browick			14 July 1972	TG1304601494; 52°34′10″N 1°08′32″E		1196672	Upload Photo	Q26491191
Browick Hall Cottage	II	Browick Road, NR18 9RB, Browick			14 July 1972	TG1305701365; 52°34′06″N 1°08′32″E		1297523	Upload Photo	Q26585095
Brewhouse and Attached Outbuilding at Cavick House	II	Cavick House			29 December 1950	TG1023301302; 52°34′08″N 1°06′03″E		1196717	Upload Photo	Q26491232
Cavick House Farmhouse	II	Cavick House			29 December 1950	TG1020201356; 52°34′10″N 1°06′01″E		1297505	Upload Photo	Q26585077
Cavick House Including Front Screen Walls	I	Cavick House			29 December 1950	TG1023801265; 52°34′07″N 1°06′03″E		1196716	Upload Photo	Q17537628
Dovecote at Cavick House	II	Cavick House			29 December 1950	TG1019401343; 52°34′09″N 1°06′01″E		1196718	Upload Photo	Q26491233
East House and West House and Attached Wall to Rear at Cavick House	II	Cavick House			29 December 1950	TG1021501278; 52°34′07″N 1°06′02″E		1297506	Upload Photo	Q26585078
Garden Wall South and West of Cavick House	II	Cavick House			29 December 1950	TG1016601237; 52°34′06″N 1°05′59″E		1196719	Upload Photo	Q26491234
Large Barn 35 Metres West of Brewhouse at Cavick House	II	Cavick House			29 December 1950	TG1020801314; 52°34′08″N 1°06′01″E		1297507	Upload Photo	Q26585079
Piece of Wall 80 Metres West of Cavick House	II	Cavick House			14 September 1992	TG1017101287; 52°34′08″N 1°05′59″E		1196720	Upload Photo	Q26491235
Small Barn 25 Metres North West of Brewhouse at Cavick House	II	Cavick House			29 December 1950	TG1021801333; 52°34′09″N 1°06′02″E		1196721	Upload Photo	Q26491236
Stables at Cavick House	II	Cavick House			29 December 1950	TG1019801284; 52°34′07″N 1°06′01″E		1208297	Upload Photo	Q26503379
Wall of Garden 100 Metres West of Cavick House	II	Cavick House			29 December 1950	TG1016201292; 52°34′08″N 1°05′59″E		1196722	Upload Photo	Q26491237
Railway Cottages	II	15, 16 and 17, Cemetery Lane			14 July 1972	TG1138300968; 52°33′56″N 1°07′03″E		1293125	Upload Photo	Q26581083
Cemetery Chapel	II	Cemetery Lane	chapel		14 September 1992	TG1120900980; 52°33′56″N 1°06′54″E		1196732	Cemetery Chapel More images	Q26491246
The Old Goods Shed	II	Cemetery Lane			14 July 1972	TG1143800999; 52°33′57″N 1°07′06″E		1208546	Upload Photo	Q26503616
The Old Meeting House	II	Chapel Lane, Chapel Bell			29 December 1950	TG0930502626; 52°34′52″N 1°05′16″E		1297491	Upload Photo	Q26585066
1, 3 and 3a, Church Street	II	1, 3 and 3a, Church Street			29 December 1950	TG1088101540; 52°34′15″N 1°06′37″E		1196691	Upload Photo	Q26491208
Becket's Chapel	I	2, Church Street, NR18 0PH	public library		29 December 1950	TG1087601562; 52°34′16″N 1°06′37″E		1297495	Becket's Chapel More images	Q17537633
5 and 7, Church Street	II	5 and 7, Church Street			29 December 1950	TG1087101534; 52°34′15″N 1°06′37″E		1297492	Upload Photo	Q26585067
Green Dragon Public House	II*	6, Church Street	pub		29 December 1950	TG1084201559; 52°34′15″N 1°06′35″E		1196692	Green Dragon Public House More images	Q17532605
Churchgate House	II	8, Church Street			29 December 1950	TG1084401541; 52°34′15″N 1°06′36″E		1196693	Upload Photo	Q26491209
Abbey View and Abbey House	II	12, 14 and 16, Church Street			29 December 1950	TG1081601545; 52°34′15″N 1°06′34″E		1297493	Upload Photo	Q26585068
Abbey Church of St Mary and St Thomas of Canterbury	I	Church Street	abbey		29 December 1950	TG1068601497; 52°34′14″N 1°06′27″E		1297494	Abbey Church of St Mary and St Thomas of Canterbury More images	Q8039988
Ada Hart Room and the Abbey Schoolroom	II	Church Street			14 July 1972	TG1074401568; 52°34′16″N 1°06′30″E		1292215	Upload Photo	Q26580248
Garden Walls to West and Wouth West of No 18 (holmwood House) (not Included)	II	Church Street			14 September 1992	TG1077501563; 52°34′16″N 1°06′32″E		1196694	Upload Photo	Q26491210
Precinct Walls to North East of Abbey Church and Attached Gate	II	Church Street			14 July 1972	TG1076701556; 52°34′15″N 1°06′31″E		1196695	Upload Photo	Q26491211
Remains of Chapter House and Surrounding Fragments of Abbey Church	II	Church Street			29 December 1950	TG1072101485; 52°34′13″N 1°06′29″E		1292209	Upload Photo	Q26580242
4 and 6, Cock Street	II	4 and 6, Cock Street			14 July 1972	TG1078601895; 52°34′26″N 1°06′33″E		1292218	Upload Photo	Q26580251
8 and 10, Cock Street	II	8 and 10, Cock Street			14 July 1972	TG1078301903; 52°34′27″N 1°06′33″E		1196696	Upload Photo	Q26491212
12 and 14, Cock Street	II	12 and 14, Cock Street			14 July 1972	TG1077701918; 52°34′27″N 1°06′33″E		1217953	Upload Photo	Q26512633
The Chestnuts	II*	16, Cock Street			26 January 1995	TG1077001941; 52°34′28″N 1°06′32″E		1243874	Upload Photo	Q17532631
18 and 20, Cock Street	II	18 and 20, Cock Street			29 December 1950	TG1076901950; 52°34′28″N 1°06′32″E		1196697	Upload Photo	Q26491213
Oak House Wincar House	II	19, Cock Street			29 December 1950	TG1074001955; 52°34′28″N 1°06′31″E		1217964	Upload Photo	Q26512642
Trafford	II	22, Cock Street			14 July 1972	TG1076101968; 52°34′29″N 1°06′32″E		1297496	Upload Photo	Q26585069
The Little House	II	23, Cock Street			14 July 1972	TG1073701960; 52°34′29″N 1°06′31″E		1196698	Upload Photo	Q26491214
The Cock Inn	II	25, Cock Street			29 December 1950	TG1072501993; 52°34′30″N 1°06′30″E		1218004	Upload Photo	Q26512677
Warehouse Range to Rear of 22	II	Cock Street			14 July 1972	TG1077501985; 52°34′29″N 1°06′33″E		1217992	Upload Photo	Q26512668
Limetree Farmhouse	II	Compass Lane, Silfield			29 December 1950	TG1286800052; 52°33′24″N 1°08′19″E		1196699	Upload Photo	Q26491215
2, Damgate Street	II	2, Damgate Street			29 December 1950	TG1089201529; 52°34′14″N 1°06′38″E		1218010	Upload Photo	Q26512683
10 and 12, Damgate Street	II	10 and 12, Damgate Street			14 July 1972	TG1088501492; 52°34′13″N 1°06′38″E		1196700	Upload Photo	Q26491216
13 and 15, Damgate Street	II	13 and 15, Damgate Street			14 July 1972	TG1090201452; 52°34′12″N 1°06′38″E		1218017	Upload Photo	Q26512690
14 and 14a, Damgate Street	II	14 and 14a, Damgate Street			14 July 1972	TG1088701477; 52°34′13″N 1°06′38″E		1292147	Upload Photo	Q26580190
16, Damgate Street	II	16, Damgate Street			14 July 1972	TG1088501469; 52°34′13″N 1°06′38″E		1196701	Upload Photo	Q26491217
Oakhouse	II	18, Damgate Street			29 December 1950	TG1088401458; 52°34′12″N 1°06′37″E		1218046	Upload Photo	Q26512715
Harvey House	II	20 and 22, Damgate Street			14 July 1972	TG1088401440; 52°34′12″N 1°06′37″E		1196702	Upload Photo	Q26491218
21 and 23, Damgate Street	II	21 and 23, Damgate Street			14 July 1972	TG1090001430; 52°34′11″N 1°06′38″E		1218063	Upload Photo	Q26512729
Jetty House	II	24, Damgate Street			14 July 1972	TG1088401431; 52°34′11″N 1°06′37″E		1196703	Upload Photo	Q26491219
25 and 27, Damgate Street	II	25 and 27, Damgate Street			14 July 1972	TG1090001421; 52°34′11″N 1°06′38″E		1292162	Upload Photo	Q26580202
26 and 28, Damgate Street	II	26 and 28, Damgate Street			14 July 1972	TG1088501420; 52°34′11″N 1°06′37″E		1196704	Upload Photo	Q26491220
29 and 31, Damgate Street	II	29 and 31, Damgate Street			29 December 1950	TG1090201410; 52°34′11″N 1°06′38″E		1218073	Upload Photo	Q26512738
30, Damgate Street	II	30, Damgate Street			14 July 1972	TG1088601408; 52°34′11″N 1°06′37″E		1196705	Upload Photo	Q26491221
33-39, Damgate Street	II	33-39, Damgate Street			14 July 1972	TG1090501390; 52°34′10″N 1°06′38″E		1292135	Upload Photo	Q26580179
Hillboro	II	36, Damgate Street			14 July 1972	TG1088601388; 52°34′10″N 1°06′37″E		1196706	Upload Photo	Q26491222
Community Hall	II	47, Damgate Street			14 July 1972	TG1091901357; 52°34′09″N 1°06′39″E		1292090	Upload Photo	Q26580140
49, 51 and 53, Damgate Street	II	49, 51 and 53, Damgate Street			14 July 1972	TG1090401349; 52°34′09″N 1°06′38″E		1292136	Upload Photo	Q26580180
50-56, Damgate Street	II	50-56, Damgate Street			14 July 1972	TG1088301336; 52°34′08″N 1°06′37″E		1297497	Upload Photo	Q26585070
55, Damgate Street	II	55, Damgate Street			14 July 1972	TG1090201334; 52°34′08″N 1°06′38″E		1196707	Upload Photo	Q26491223
57, Damgate Street	II	57, Damgate Street			14 July 1972	TG1090101328; 52°34′08″N 1°06′38″E		1292138	Upload Photo	Q26580182
58, Damgate Street	II	58, Damgate Street			14 July 1972	TG1087901323; 52°34′08″N 1°06′37″E		1297498	Upload Photo	Q26585071
59, Damgate Street	II	59, Damgate Street			14 July 1972	TG1090101322; 52°34′08″N 1°06′38″E		1196708	Upload Photo	Q26491224
60 and 62, Damgate Street	II	60 and 62, Damgate Street			14 July 1972	TG1088101317; 52°34′08″N 1°06′37″E		1292096	Upload Photo	Q26580146
61 and 63, Damgate Street	II	61 and 63, Damgate Street			14 July 1972	TG1090001314; 52°34′07″N 1°06′38″E		1297499	Upload Photo	Q26585072
64 and 66, Damgate Street	II	64 and 66, Damgate Street			29 December 1950	TG1088001310; 52°34′07″N 1°06′37″E		1218170	Upload Photo	Q26512828
65, Damgate Street	II	65, Damgate Street			29 December 1950	TG1089901296; 52°34′07″N 1°06′38″E		1196709	Upload Photo	Q26491225
67, Damgate Street	II	67, Damgate Street			14 July 1972	TG1090001279; 52°34′06″N 1°06′38″E		1292099	Upload Photo	Q26580149
68 and 70, Damgate Street	II	68 and 70, Damgate Street			29 December 1950	TG1087701286; 52°34′07″N 1°06′37″E		1218180	Upload Photo	Q26512838
53a, Damgate Street	II	53a, Damgate Street			14 July 1972	TG1090201342; 52°34′08″N 1°06′38″E		1218092	Upload Photo	Q26512755
Railings and Gates to No 47	II	Damgate Street			14 July 1972	TG1091101364; 52°34′09″N 1°06′39″E		1218090	Upload Photo	Q26512753
The Cottage	II	2, Fairland Street			14 July 1972	TG1108001420; 52°34′11″N 1°06′48″E		1196710	Upload Photo	Q26491226
5 and 7, Fairland Street	II	5 and 7, Fairland Street			14 July 1972	TG1113301427; 52°34′11″N 1°06′51″E		1218190	Upload Photo	Q26512848
20, Fairland Street	II	20, Fairland Street			14 September 1992	TG1114001389; 52°34′10″N 1°06′51″E		1297500	Upload Photo	Q26585073
21 and 23, Fairland Street	II	21 and 23, Fairland Street			7 March 1974	TG1117701421; 52°34′11″N 1°06′53″E		1292073	Upload Photo	Q26580124
24 and 26, Fairland Street	II	24 and 26, Fairland Street			14 July 1972	TG1115001380; 52°34′09″N 1°06′51″E		1196711	Upload Photo	Q26491227
30 and 32, Fairland Street	II	30 and 32, Fairland Street			14 July 1972	TG1117601366; 52°34′09″N 1°06′53″E		1196669	Upload Photo	Q26491188
Pennybrick Hall	II	4, Friarscroft Lane			14 July 1972	TG1103601335; 52°34′08″N 1°06′45″E		1297521	Upload Photo	Q26585093
Lodges, Gates and Gate Piers to Kimberley House	II	Gates And Gate Piers To Kimberley House, Barnham Broom Road			14 July 1972	TG0975504988; 52°36′08″N 1°05′46″E		1293167	Upload Photo	Q26581125
Wymondham War Memorial	II	Junction Of Vicar Street And Middleton Street, NR18 0AB	war memorial		14 January 2019	TG1081501720; 52°34′21″N 1°06′34″E		1460831	Wymondham War Memorial More images	Q66479975
Ivy Green Villa	II	London Road			10 May 1989	TG1052000844; 52°33′53″N 1°06′17″E		1297524	Upload Photo	Q26585096
1, Market Place	II	1, Market Place			14 July 1972	TG1105401507; 52°34′14″N 1°06′47″E		1196675	Upload Photo	Q26491194
8, Market Place	II	8, Market Place			29 December 1950	TG1111701466; 52°34′12″N 1°06′50″E		1292056	Upload Photo	Q26580109
9 and 10, Market Place	II	9 and 10, Market Place			29 December 1950	TG1112501445; 52°34′11″N 1°06′50″E		1297525	Upload Photo	Q26585097
Cross Keys Inn	II	13, Market Place			29 December 1950	TG1107601428; 52°34′11″N 1°06′48″E		1196676	Cross Keys Inn More images	Q26491195
14 and 14a, Market Place	II	14 and 14a, Market Place			29 December 1950	TG1106401445; 52°34′11″N 1°06′47″E		1218257	Upload Photo	Q26512903
15, Market Place	II	15, Market Place			29 December 1950	TG1105801450; 52°34′12″N 1°06′47″E		1218278	Upload Photo	Q26512920
16, Market Place	II	16, Market Place			29 December 1950	TG1104901455; 52°34′12″N 1°06′46″E		1196677	Upload Photo	Q26491196
Anchor House	II	12a and 12b, Market Place			14 July 1972	TG1108101433; 52°34′11″N 1°06′48″E		1292060	Upload Photo	Q26580112
Market Cross	I	Market Place	market cross		29 December 1950	TG1107001472; 52°34′12″N 1°06′47″E		1196678	Market Cross More images	Q17537624
2, Market Street	II	2, Market Street			29 December 1950	TG1091401521; 52°34′14″N 1°06′39″E		1292020	Upload Photo	Q26580078
3, Market Street	II*	3, Market Street			29 December 1950	TG1091901551; 52°34′15″N 1°06′40″E		1196679	Upload Photo	Q17532590
4 and 6, Market Street	II	4 and 6, Market Street			29 December 1950	TG1091801510; 52°34′14″N 1°06′39″E		1218327	Upload Photo	Q26512965
7, Market Street	II	7, Market Street			29 December 1950	TG1093001549; 52°34′15″N 1°06′40″E		1196680	Upload Photo	Q26491197
8, 10 and 10a, Market Street	II	8, 10 and 10a, Market Street			29 December 1950	TG1094801510; 52°34′14″N 1°06′41″E		1218330	Upload Photo	Q26512968
11 and 13, Market Street	II	11 and 13, Market Street			29 December 1950	TG1094201541; 52°34′15″N 1°06′41″E		1196681	Upload Photo	Q26491198
12, Market Street	II	12, Market Street			29 December 1950	TG1095001506; 52°34′14″N 1°06′41″E		1218345	Upload Photo	Q26512982
15 and 17, Market Street	II	15 and 17, Market Street			29 December 1950	TG1094201529; 52°34′14″N 1°06′41″E		1196682	Upload Photo	Q26491199
16, 16a and 16c, Market Street	II	16, 16a and 16c, Market Street			29 December 1950	TG1096001496; 52°34′13″N 1°06′42″E		1291997	Upload Photo	Q26580057
18 and 20, Market Street	II	18 and 20, Market Street			29 December 1950	TG1097301497; 52°34′13″N 1°06′42″E		1196683	Upload Photo	Q26491200
19 and 21, Market Street	II	19 and 21, Market Street			29 December 1950	TG1096601526; 52°34′14″N 1°06′42″E		1291999	Upload Photo	Q26580059
24 and 26, Market Street	II	24 and 26, Market Street			29 December 1950	TG1098801492; 52°34′13″N 1°06′43″E		1297526	Upload Photo	Q26585098
White Hart Inn	II	29, Market Street			29 December 1950	TG1098401520; 52°34′14″N 1°06′43″E		1218384	Upload Photo	Q26513021
30, Market Street	II	30, Market Street			29 December 1950	TG1100401476; 52°34′13″N 1°06′44″E		1196684	Upload Photo	Q26491201
47 and 47a, Market Street	II	47 and 47a, Market Street			29 December 1950	TG1104001508; 52°34′14″N 1°06′46″E		1291977	Upload Photo	Q26580037
49, Market Street	II	49, Market Street			29 December 1950	TG1104701513; 52°34′14″N 1°06′46″E		1297527	Upload Photo	Q26585099
Oakland Farmhouse	II	Melton Road, Downham			14 July 1972	TG1251504232; 52°35′40″N 1°08′10″E		1291979	Upload Photo	Q26580039
2 and 4, Middleton Street	II	2 and 4, Middleton Street			14 July 1972	TG1090901565; 52°34′16″N 1°06′39″E		1218402	Upload Photo	Q26513036
Cauis House	II	3, 5 and 7, Middleton Street			29 December 1950	TG1085401601; 52°34′17″N 1°06′36″E		1196685	Upload Photo	Q26491202
6, 8 and 8a, Middleton Street	II	6, 8 and 8a, Middleton Street			14 July 1972	TG1090401568; 52°34′16″N 1°06′39″E		1218410	Upload Photo	Q26513043
10 and 12, Middleton Street	II	10 and 12, Middleton Street			14 July 1972	TG1089801584; 52°34′16″N 1°06′38″E		1196686	Upload Photo	Q26491203
York House	II	11, Middleton Street			14 July 1972	TG1084501635; 52°34′18″N 1°06′36″E		1218417	Upload Photo	Q26513050
Priory House	II*	13-19, Middleton Street			29 December 1950	TG1083901644; 52°34′18″N 1°06′35″E		1297488	Upload Photo	Q17532654
Town Hall	II	14, Middleton Street	city hall		29 December 1950	TG1088801610; 52°34′17″N 1°06′38″E		1196687	Town Hall More images	Q26491204
Beech House	II	20, Middleton Street			14 July 1972	TG1086201680; 52°34′19″N 1°06′37″E		1291955	Upload Photo	Q26580018
24, 26 and 28, Middleton Street	II	24, 26 and 28, Middleton Street			29 December 1950	TG1084101710; 52°34′20″N 1°06′36″E		1297489	Upload Photo	Q26585064
Stables 15 Metres North West of Priory House	II	Middleton Street			14 July 1972	TG1082601679; 52°34′19″N 1°06′35″E		1291991	Upload Photo	Q26580051
The Bridewell	II	4, Norwich Road	prison		14 July 1972	TG1127601521; 52°34′14″N 1°06′58″E		1218450	The Bridewell More images	Q8039989
132, Norwich Road	II	132, Norwich Road			29 December 1950	TG1216801987; 52°34′27″N 1°07′47″E		1291967	Upload Photo	Q26580027
House East of Courtyard to 4 (the Bridewell)	II	Norwich Road			14 September 1992	TG1130801526; 52°34′14″N 1°07′00″E		1196688	Upload Photo	Q26491205
1, 3 and 5, Pople Street	II	1, 3 and 5, Pople Street			14 July 1972	TG1079501882; 52°34′26″N 1°06′34″E		1196689	Upload Photo	Q26491206
9, Pople Street	II	9, Pople Street			14 July 1972	TG1082401888; 52°34′26″N 1°06′35″E		1218462	Upload Photo	Q26513087
23 and 25, Pople Street	II	23 and 25, Pople Street			23 September 1982	TG1084901916; 52°34′27″N 1°06′37″E		1297490	Upload Photo	Q26585065
1, Queen Street (see Details for Further Address Information)	II	1, Queen Street			29 December 1950	TG1104701461; 52°34′12″N 1°06′46″E		1218284	Upload Photo	Q26512926
The Sawyers House	II	Sawyer's Lane			29 December 1950	TM0977799168; 52°33′00″N 1°05′34″E		1196650	Upload Photo	Q26491168
Silfield Old Hall	II	1, Silfield Road, Silfield			29 December 1950	TM1200699574; 52°33′10″N 1°07′33″E		1297512	Upload Photo	Q26585084
Coll's Farmhouse	II	Silfield Road, Silfield			29 December 1950	TM1171599925; 52°33′21″N 1°07′18″E		1196651	Upload Photo	Q26491169
Ivy Cottage	II	Silfield Road, Silfield			14 September 1992	TM1217199568; 52°33′09″N 1°07′41″E		1196652	Upload Photo	Q26491170
Mariner's Inn	II	Silfield Road, Wattlefield			14 September 1992	TM1219399119; 52°32′55″N 1°07′41″E		1297513	Upload Photo	Q26585085
School House, Formerly Silfield School and Attached Teacher's House	II	Silfield Street, Silfield, NR18 9NL			23 February 2015	TM1263599484; 52°33′06″N 1°08′06″E		1423349	Upload Photo	Q26677001
K6 Telephone Kiosk	II	Station Approach			25 February 1994	TG1141000962; 52°33′55″N 1°07′04″E		1244672	Upload Photo	Q26537264
Wymondham Railway Station (main Building) and North Platform	II	Station Approach, NR18 0JZ			14 July 1972	TG1142000963; 52°33′55″N 1°07′05″E		1208540	Upload Photo	Q26503610
Gonville Hall	II	Suton Lane			29 December 1950	TG0992400174; 52°33′32″N 1°05′44″E		1196653	Upload Photo	Q26491171
Congregational Church Including Railings	II	The Fairland	church building		14 July 1972	TG1123401396; 52°34′10″N 1°06′56″E		1196654	Congregational Church Including Railings More images	Q26491172
2, 2a, 2b and 4, Town Green	II	2, 2a, 2b and 4, Town Green			14 July 1972	TG1083601733; 52°34′21″N 1°06′36″E		1291869	Upload Photo	Q26579941
3, 3a and 5, Town Green	II	3, 3a and 5, Town Green			14 July 1972	TG1079201761; 52°34′22″N 1°06′33″E		1196655	Upload Photo	Q26491173
Town Green Villa and Attached Railings	II	6, Town Green			14 July 1972	TG1083301748; 52°34′22″N 1°06′35″E		1291875	Upload Photo	Q26579946
Mayfair	II	7, Town Green			14 July 1972	TG1080101779; 52°34′23″N 1°06′34″E		1196656	Upload Photo	Q26491174
9, Town Green	II	9, Town Green			29 December 1950	TG1078801802; 52°34′23″N 1°06′33″E		1218657	Upload Photo	Q26513271
The Yeoman's House	II	14, Town Green			29 December 1950	TG1082701802; 52°34′23″N 1°06′35″E		1196657	Upload Photo	Q26491175
17, Town Green	II	17, Town Green			26 August 1987	TG1079001851; 52°34′25″N 1°06′33″E		1218672	Upload Photo	Q26513285
Lyng Cottages	II	18 and 20, Town Green			14 July 1972	TG1082501814; 52°34′24″N 1°06′35″E		1196658	Upload Photo	Q26491176
Methodist Church	II	Town Green	Protestant church building		14 September 1992	TG1083801773; 52°34′22″N 1°06′36″E		1291817	Methodist Church More images	Q26579893
1 and 3, Vicar Street	II	1 and 3, Vicar Street			14 July 1972	TG1078201661; 52°34′19″N 1°06′32″E		1291819	Upload Photo	Q26579895
The Vicarage Including Attached Forecourt Wall	II	5, Vicar Street			29 December 1950	TG1077701632; 52°34′18″N 1°06′32″E		1196659	Upload Photo	Q26491177
Canterbury House	II	6, Vicar Street			29 December 1950	TG1078801721; 52°34′21″N 1°06′33″E		1196660	Upload Photo	Q26491179
No 7 and Attached Garage	II	7, Vicar Street			14 July 1972	TG1075701621; 52°34′18″N 1°06′31″E		1218720	Upload Photo	Q26513331
Rook House	II	8, Vicar Street			29 December 1950	TG1078501711; 52°34′20″N 1°06′33″E		1218727	Upload Photo	Q26513337
Vicar Street House	II	9, Vicar Street			29 December 1950	TG1074401602; 52°34′17″N 1°06′30″E		1297515	Upload Photo	Q26585087
Conon House	II	10, Vicar Street			29 December 1950	TG1077801696; 52°34′20″N 1°06′32″E		1291835	Upload Photo	Q26579910
Abbotsford	II	12, Vicar Street			14 July 1972	TG1073801688; 52°34′20″N 1°06′30″E		1196662	Upload Photo	Q26491181
14 and 16, Vicar Street	II	14 and 16, Vicar Street			14 July 1972	TG1073501623; 52°34′18″N 1°06′30″E		1297516	Upload Photo	Q26585088
Abbeyway	II	18, Vicar Street			14 July 1972	TG1072801602; 52°34′17″N 1°06′29″E		1218737	Upload Photo	Q26513346
Bell Cottage	II	20, Vicar Street			14 July 1972	TG1072201593; 52°34′17″N 1°06′29″E		1196663	Upload Photo	Q26491182
7a, Vicar Street	II	7a, Vicar Street			14 July 1972	TG1075001612; 52°34′17″N 1°06′31″E		1196661	Upload Photo	Q26491180
Stables 5 Metres North East of the Vicarage and Attached Wall	II	Vicar Street			14 July 1972	TG1077801644; 52°34′18″N 1°06′32″E		1218713	Upload Photo	Q26513325
Stables to East of 12	II	Vicar Street			14 September 1992	TG1077601690; 52°34′20″N 1°06′32″E		1291797	Upload Photo	Q26579874
Manor Farmhouse	II	Wramplingham Road, Downham			29 December 1950	TG1149704162; 52°35′39″N 1°07′16″E		1291801	Upload Photo	Q26683792
Wymondham South Junction Signal Box	II	Wymondham Railway Station	signal box		16 May 2013	TG1132200889; 52°33′53″N 1°06′59″E		1414469	Wymondham South Junction Signal Box More images	Q26676414
Two Barns to West of Wood Farmhouse	II	Youngmans Road, Downham			14 July 1972	TG1064204149; 52°35′39″N 1°06′31″E		1218744	Upload Photo	Q26513352
Wood Farmhouse	II	Youngmans Road, Downham			14 July 1972	TG1067304166; 52°35′40″N 1°06′32″E		1196664	Upload Photo	Q26491183

== See also ==
- Grade I listed buildings in Norfolk
- Grade II* listed buildings in Norfolk

== Sources ==
- Wilson, Bill; Pevsner, Nikolaus (1999) [1962], Norfolk 2: North-West and South, The Buildings of England, New Haven and London: Yale University Press, ISBN 978-0-300-09657-6
