= Philip Fryer =

English cricketer

Philip Algernon Fryer (1870–1950) was an English cricketer active from 1895 to 1908 who played for Northamptonshire (Northants). He was born in Wymondham, Norfolk on 26 June 1870 and died in Wilby, Northamptonshire on 4 November 1950. He appeared in two first-class matches as a righthanded batsman who bowled underarm lobs. He scored 83 runs with a highest score of 38 and took three wickets with a best performance of three for 35.
