= Wymondham High Academy =

Location
- Folly Road; Wymondham, Norfolk, NR18 0QT; England; 52.5754°N 1.1179°E

Information
- Type: Academy
- Specialist: Arts
- Department for Education URN: 137461 Tables
- Ofsted: Reports
- Principal: Chris Smith
- Gender: Mixed
- Age: 11 to 18
- Enrolment: 1620
- Capacity: 1460
- Houses: Ellis, MacMillan, Abbey and Cheshire
- Publication: WyHigh, a newsletter for students and guardians
- Specialist status: Arts (operational)
- Pupils receiving free school meals: 7.1% (2013)
- Website: www.wymondhamhigh.co.uk

Wymondham High Academy is a state-funded co-educational academy school in the English county of Norfolk. It is near the centre of the town of Wymondham, to the west of Norwich. It has around 1,650 pupils aged 11 to 18. The principal is Christopher Smith.

In 2017, the academy received a 'good' report from Ofsted.

== Campus ==
The school is divided into 4 blocks: North (English, Geography, I.T), South (Sciences, Music, Drama), Middle (Maths, Languages, RE, DT) and, from 2013, East (Art, History). There is also a relatively small social sciences block. Neighbouring Wymondham Leisure Centre is used for its physical education facilities.

== New history and art block ==
In 2012, the school received a £3 million grant from Norfolk County Council to build a new Art and History block. It was built by contractors R G Carter Ltd and was completed in July 2013, covering 1,336 sq/m in total.

== Notable alumni ==
- Mark Mitchell, silver medal-winning figure skater
- Aimee Palmer, women's footballer for Ipswich Town
