= Wymondham Bridewell =

Former police station and jail in Wymondham

Coordinates: 52.570468°N 1.116192°E

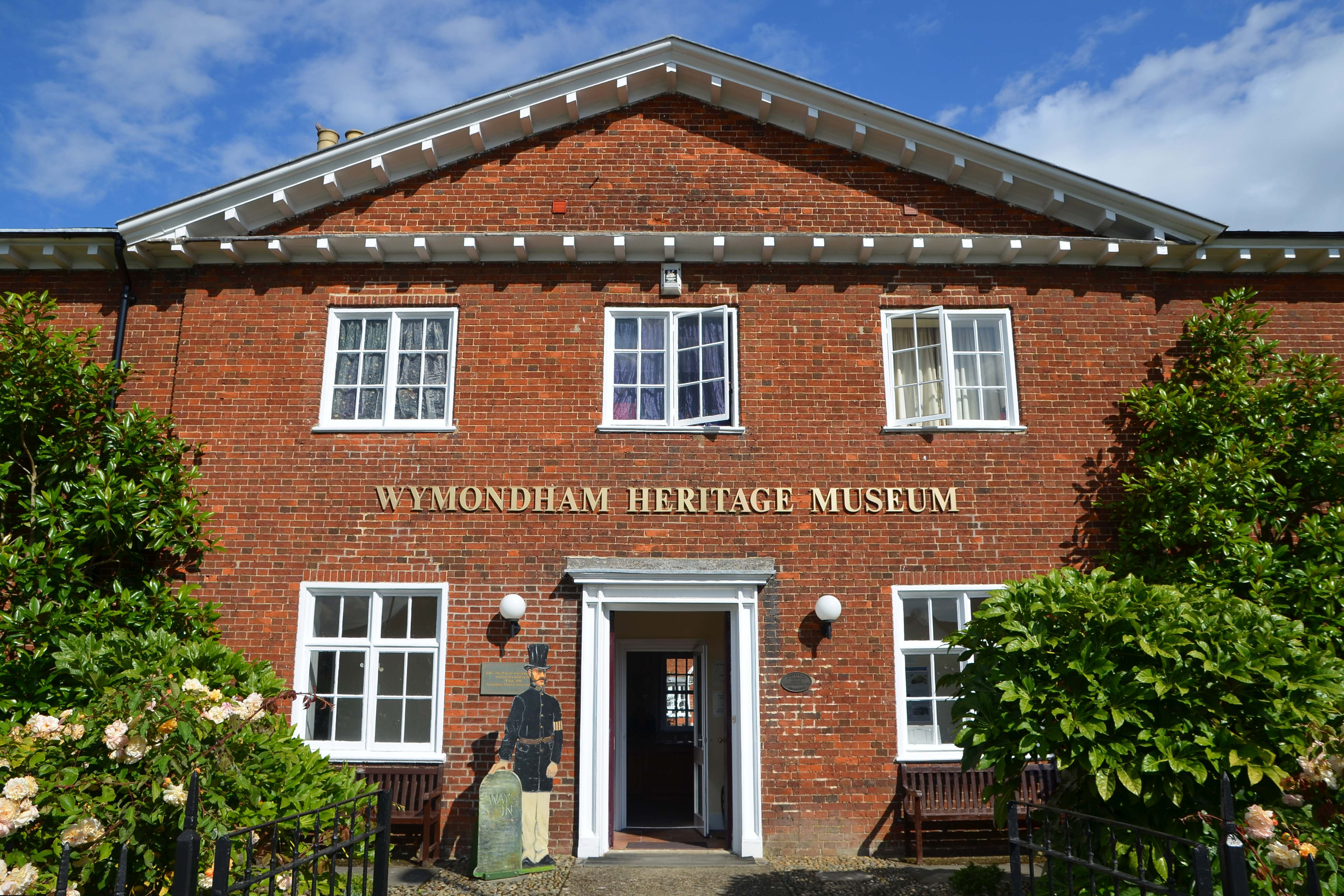
Wymondham Heritage Museum in September 2017

Wymondham Bridewell was the local prison or bridewell in Wymondham, Norfolk. The site was in use as a prison from as early as 1619. The present, grade II listed building dates from the 1780s. It closed as a prison in 1878. Since then it has had various uses including police station and courthouse. At present the main part of the building houses the Wymondham Heritage Museum.

The building was constructed in the form of a square and, in the 1820s the Governor's house was at the front, cells were on either sides and the treadmill was at the back; There were 22 cells and most of them were 12×7 feet. They had brick floors and contained two iron beds, some three.

In 1824, the Bridewell staff included the Governor, two turnkeys and a miller and it contained two classes, two wards, treadwheel (image), three day-rooms, two airing yards and the mill yard. After 1827 the Bridewell remained unoccupied until it was re-opened, chiefly for the incarceration of females in 1832. The average number of prisoners, in 1842, was 19. By 1853, although the Bridewell was a woman's prison, it was sometimes used to house men awaiting transfer, with even quite dangerous prisoners kept there.

The conditions appear to have been quite civilised by the 1850s, as there were only nineteen inmates at the time of the 1853 report. Of the prisoners, five were under 16, five were married and 14 unmarried. The women were instructed in reading and writing by the Matron and the Chaplain holds regular services and instruction and many of the prisoners ended up taking jobs at the time of their release. The employment for the prisoners at the time included washing, ironing, mat-making, knitting, needlework and cleaning the prison. The inmates at Wymondham were responsible for making, mending & washing the linen for Norwich Castle Prison, as well as their own and this work alone was valued at £69 9/9d that year.
