= Embrace the Middle East =

Charity

Embrace the Middle East is a charity, originally founded in 1854 as a Christian mission to the Ottoman Empire and now active in the successor states with projects in healthcare, education and community development.

== History ==
The society was set up in 1854 by a group of English evangelical philanthropists including Sir Culling Eardley and Lord Shaftesbury as the Turkish Missions' Aid Society, its purpose being to support Armenian Christians in Turkey. A supporter magazine, The Star in the East, was first published in 1883.

In 1893, as its activities outside Turkey developed, the society changed its name to Bible Lands Missions Aid Society. In 1962 it changed its name again to Bible Lands Society, then in 1996 to BibleLands and finally in 2012 to Embrace the Middle East.

Archives of the society are held at the Cadbury Research Library, University of Birmingham.

== Political stance ==
Embrace is broadly sympathetic to the cause of the Palestinians and has been attacked as such by pro-Israeli NGO Monitor.
