= John Howard Hinton =

English author and Baptist minister

J. H. Hinton
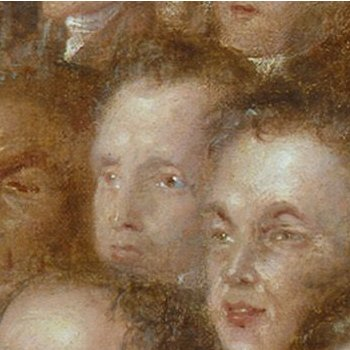
- Hinton in 1840 in the crowd at the conference. To the right is John Angell James
- Born: 1791; Oxford, England
- Died: 1873 (aged 81–82); Bristol, England
- Occupation: Minister
- Known for: Writing

John Howard Hinton (23 March 1791 – 11 December 1873) was an English writer and Baptist minister who published, along with many other works, The History and Topography of the United States of North America together with his brother Isaac Taylor Hinton (1799-1847). He is the father of surgeon James Hinton, grandfather of mathematician and science fiction author Charles Howard Hinton and ancestor of Nobel laureate Geoffrey Hinton.

== Life ==
John Howard Hinton was born in Oxford in 1791 to James Hinton (1761–1823) and Ann Hinton. His Father, James Hinton, was a pastor in Oxford, and ran a school. Hinton was taught at his father's school where he became friends with Edward Steane. Hinton first preached in Reading, afterwards became pastor of a Baptist church in London, and was distinguished as an independent and original preacher, and a zealous advocate for liberty in religion and politics, for example arguing that it was the church's responsibility to punish "violations of morality", such as lying, whereas the state should limit itself to enforcing "offences against society" (which might encompass the former, such as theft).

For many years Hinton was a joint secretary of the Baptist Union with his lifelong friend Edward Steane.

In 1840 he attended the World's Anti-Slavery Convention where he was captured in a group painting just in front of Isaac Crewdson.

In 1865 he published the sixth and last volume of his sermons. He is thought to view God as not necessarily good but a being who deserves adoration irrespective of his works.

Hinton died in 1873 in Bristol.

== Works ==
- Memoir of William Knibb, Missionary in Jamaica, 1847, accessed April 2009
- The Theological Works of Rev. John Howard Hinton, MA, in 6 volumes
- A Biographical Portraiture of the Late Rev. James Hinton, M.A. Pastor of a congregational church in the city of Oxford.
