= Ridley Haim Herschell =

Polish-born British minister (1807–1864)

Ridley Haim Herschell

Ridley Haim Herschell (7 April 1807 – 14 April 1864) was a Polish-born British minister who converted from Judaism to evangelical Christianity. He was a founder of the British Society for the Propagation of the Gospel Among the Jews (1842) and of the Evangelical Alliance (1845),

== Life ==
Herschell was born in the city of Strzelno in the Duchy of Warsaw, a French client state in Poland that had previously been under Prussian control. His parents were pious Polish Jews, and Haim Herschell decided at a very early age that he wanted to be a rabbi. He left home and studied under various teachers. Later, encouraged by his parents, he moved to Berlin to study literature and lived a decadent life, "like a Christian". He visited England for the first time on vacation but returned to Berlin to finish his studies before moving finally to London via Paris.

In France he experienced a dramatic religious conversion to Christianity and struggled with his Jewish background. He sought help from Roman Catholic clergy, but eventually turned to English evangelical contacts he had discovered in Paris through a mysterious letter of introduction he had been given before his conversion. Reconciled with his Jewish roots, but not his family, he left for England,

He entered an institution for converted Jews in the East End of London and was baptised by Charles James Blomfield, the Bishop of London, in 1830, sponsored by high-society evangelical Christians. He married Helen Skirving Mowbray, a woman ten years older than himself from Leith whom he met apparently by a chance introduction in London. They had a shared interest in the fashionable Scottish preacher Edward Irving. She had taken a deep interest in Judaism and the restoration of Israel and had already learned Hebrew. They were both ostracised by their families, moved to the poor districts of Woolwich and Camden Town and experienced hard times in spite of their upper class connections. They had the first of five children, two of whom would die young,

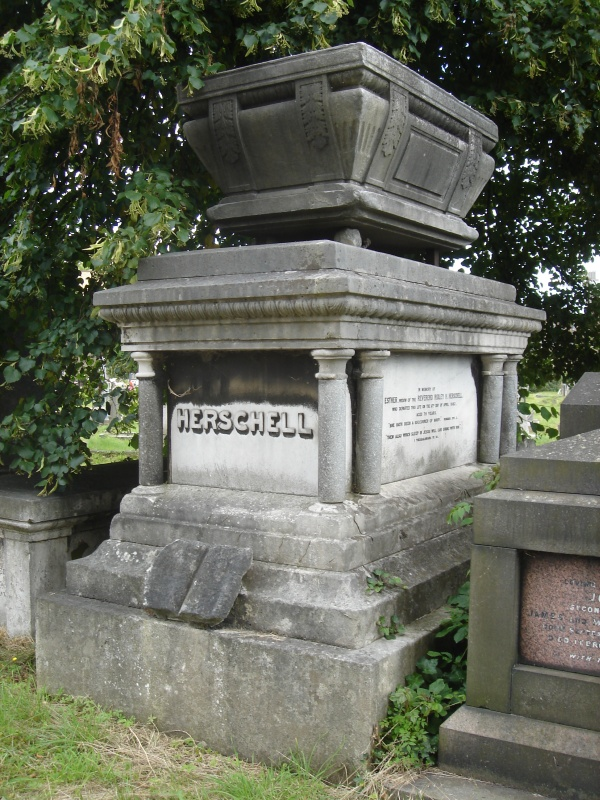
Funerary monument, Kensal Green Cemetery, London

Having financial problems caused by a wayward brother who left for America, they planned to go to Hamburg where they could live less expensively in a Jewish community but were invited by Lady Olivia Sparrow, a wealthy landowner, to manage her schools in Leigh-on-Sea, Essex, and Brampton, Huntingdonshire, but Ridley was more and more used as a preacher and pastor to the local people. He felt called to be an evangelist, which was supported by reports of amazing conversion experiences as a result of his preaching in the violent fishing village. One of the fishermen who heard him preach, Michael Tomlin, would eventually become a full-time Methodist minister in the town and a church bears his name to this day.

From 1846 he was minister of Trinity Chapel, in John Street/Newnham Street, off the Edgware Road in West London, which could accommodate 1,200 people, was built and opened for Herschell by Sir Culling Eardley and other rich supporters. But his faith was to be tested many times, especially after the death of his much loved wife and his second son. In 1855 he remarried to a rich heiress, Esther Fuller-Maitland, who had been in the wings for many years and was a friend of the family. Ridley died on 14 April 1864, while resting in the seaside resort of Brighton. After his retirement to Brighton he was succeeded by Carl Schwartz who attempted to unite a Hebrew Christian movement in London from 1865.

He is buried in Kensal Green Cemetery in London, on the main path, very close to the main entrance.

Ridley and Helen had five children:

- Ghetal (1833–1909), who married John Scott Burdon-Sanderson in 1853
- Esther (1834–1840)
- Mary (1836–1899)
- Farrer Herschell, 1st Baron Herschell (1837–1899)
- Ridley Judah (1839–1862)

== Bibliography ==
- Herschell, R. H. (1842) Reasons Why I, a Jew, Have Become a Catholic, and not a Roman Catholic. A Letter in Reply to The Rev. R.W. Sibthorp.
- — (1843a) The National Restoration of the Jews to their Fatherland, and Consequent Fulfilment of the Promise to the Patriachs. A Sermon on Hebrews 11:16 with a Preliminary Address by H.I.D.
- — (1843b) A Visit to my Father Land, Being Notes of a Journey to Syria and Palestine in 1843
- — (ed.) (1845–47) ישראל לקו The Voice of Israel. Conducted by Jews who Believe in Jesus of Nathareth as the Messiah 2 vols
- — (ed.) (1846) Psalms and Hymns for Congregational Worship
- — (ed.) (1848a) Jewish Witnesses; That Jesus is the Christ
- — (1848b) The Mystery of the Gentile Dispensation, and the Work of the Messiah
- — (1856) A Visit to my Father Land, Being Notes of a Journey to Syria and Palestine. With Additional Notes of a Journey in 1854
- — (1858) The Golden Lamp: An Eexposition of the Tabernacle and its Services
- R. H. H. [Ridley Haim Herschell] (1834) A Brief Sketch of the Present State and Future Expectations of the Jews: In a Letter Addressed to his Christian Friends
- — (1860) Strength in Weakness. Meditations on Some of the Psalms
