= Wymondham =

Market town in Norfolk, England

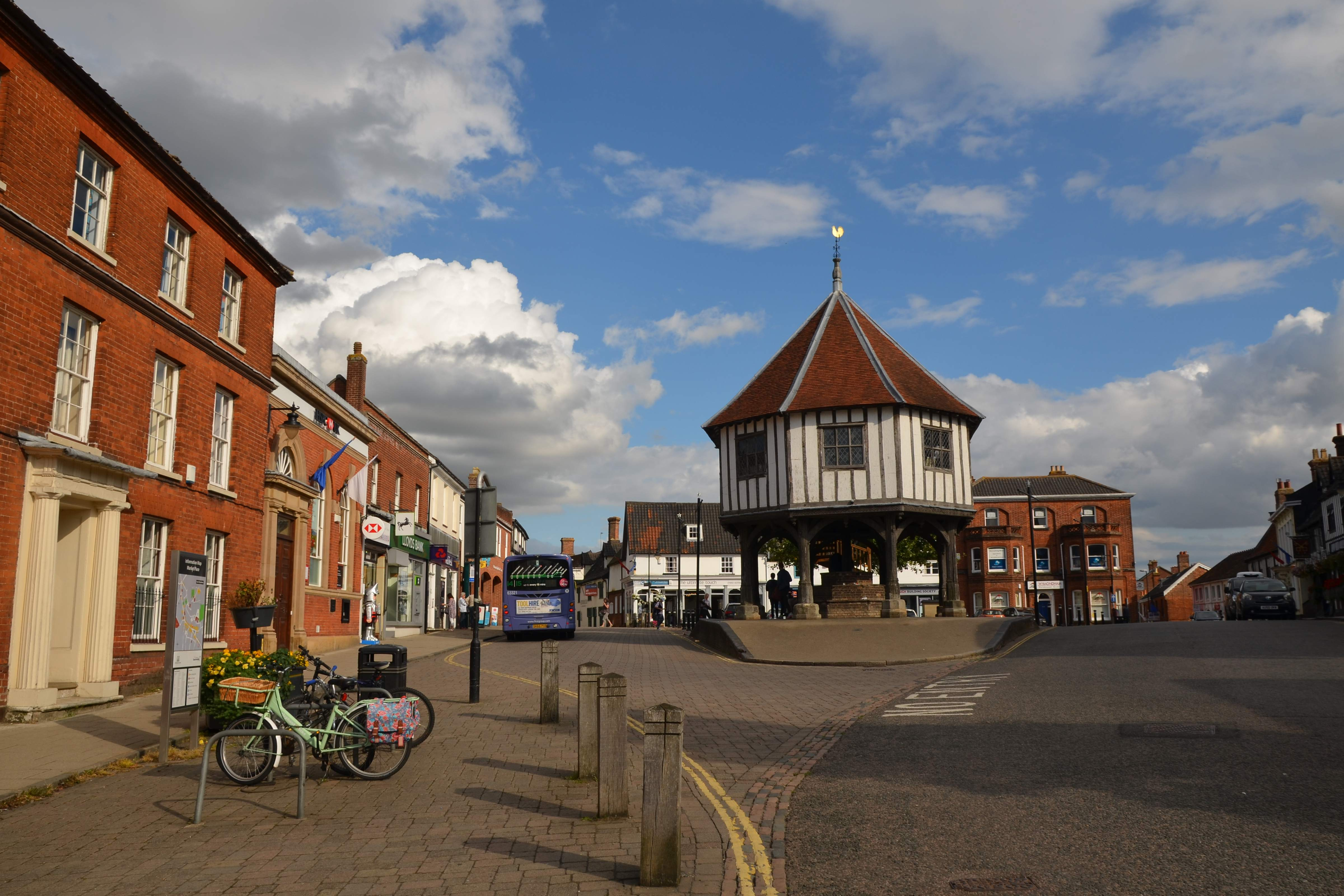
- Wymondham Market Place in September 2017

- Location within Norfolk
- Area: 44.31 km^{2} (17.11 sq mi)
- Population: 17,496 (2021 Census)
  - Density: 395/km^{2} (1,020/sq mi)
- OS grid reference: TG1101
- District: South Norfolk
- Shire county: Norfolk
- Region: East
- Country: England
- Sovereign state: United Kingdom
- Post town: WYMONDHAM
- Postcode district: NR18
- Dialling code: 01953
- Police: Norfolk
- Fire: Norfolk
- Ambulance: East of England
- UK Parliament: South Norfolk

Wymondham (/ˈwɪndəm/ WIN-dəm) is a market town and civil parish in the South Norfolk district of Norfolk, England. It lies on the River Tiffey, 10 miles (16 km) south-west of Norwich and just off the A11 road to London. The parish, one of Norfolk's largest, includes rural areas to the north and south, with hamlets of Suton, Silfield, Spooner Row and Wattlefield. It had a population of 14,405 in 2011, of whom 13,587 lived in the town itself. Wymondham is also known for its eponymous boarding school, located in the nearby Morley.

== Development ==
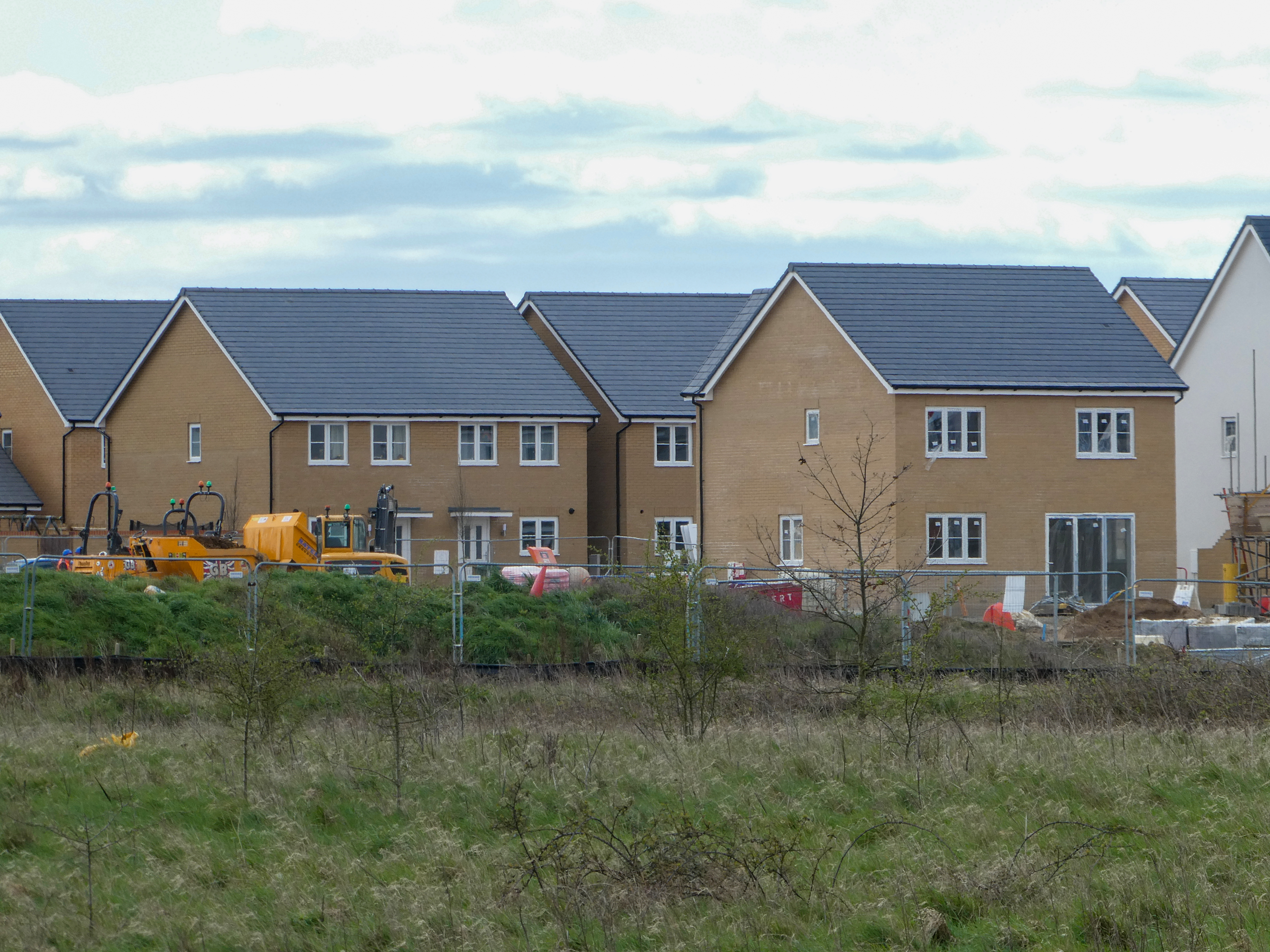
New-build houses on the outskirts of Wymondham

The community developed during the Anglo-Saxon period and expanded with the establishment of a priory in 1107 and a market in 1204. Industrially, Wymondham became known as a centre of woodturning and brush-making, retaining its brush factories until the late 20th century. New housing to the north and east of the town centre brought rapid expansion. Dual carriageways for the A11 and the development of rapid rail links to Norwich and Cambridge means Wymondham is now a commuter town. Major local employers include the headquarters of Norfolk Constabulary and the Lotus Cars factory at nearby Hethel.

The ancient centre, much damaged in a fire of 1615, contains landmarks and listed buildings that include the twin-towered Wymondham Abbey. Modern Wymondham continues to grow. The current local-authority action plan envisages building 2,200 new homes by 2026, while promoting it as "a forward-looking market town which embraces sustainable growth to enhance its unique identity and sense of community."

== History ==
=== Origin of the name ===
The uncertain, Anglo-Saxon origins of the name probably consist of a personal name such as Wigmund or Wimund, with hām meaning village or settlement, or hamm meaning a river meadow. The place has been referred to as Windham on occasions.

=== Early history ===
The site where Wymondham stands shows evidence of occupation from the earliest period of human settlement in Norfolk. Pot boilers and burnt flint have been found in nearby fields, as have flint axe-heads, scrapers and many other objects. Evidence of the Bronze Age appears in a number of ring ditches, enclosures and linear crop marks. Objects found include an arrowhead, fragments of rapiers, assorted metal tools and pottery sherds.

Iron Age artefacts were investigated systematically while the A11 bypass was being built in the early 1990s. There are postholes, quarries and evidence of iron smelting and bone working. Objects from the period include coins, jewellery and pottery.

Roman remains include an aisled structure and a copper-alloy metal-working site. A Roman road from Venta Icenorum to Watton and beyond is visible as cropmarks. Large numbers of coins and pottery sherds have been found, as have personal items such as brooches, cosmetic tools and a duck figurine.

Few Saxon buildings survive, although excavations showed a sunken-featured building with Early and Middle Saxon pottery. Remains of a possible Late Saxon church were discovered during excavations at Wymondham Abbey in 2002.

=== Middle Ages ===
By 1086, Wymondham had 376 households (giving an estimated total population of 1,880), which put it among the top 20 per cent of settlements recorded in Domesday. The land was held by two feudal Lords: William the Conqueror and William de Warenne.

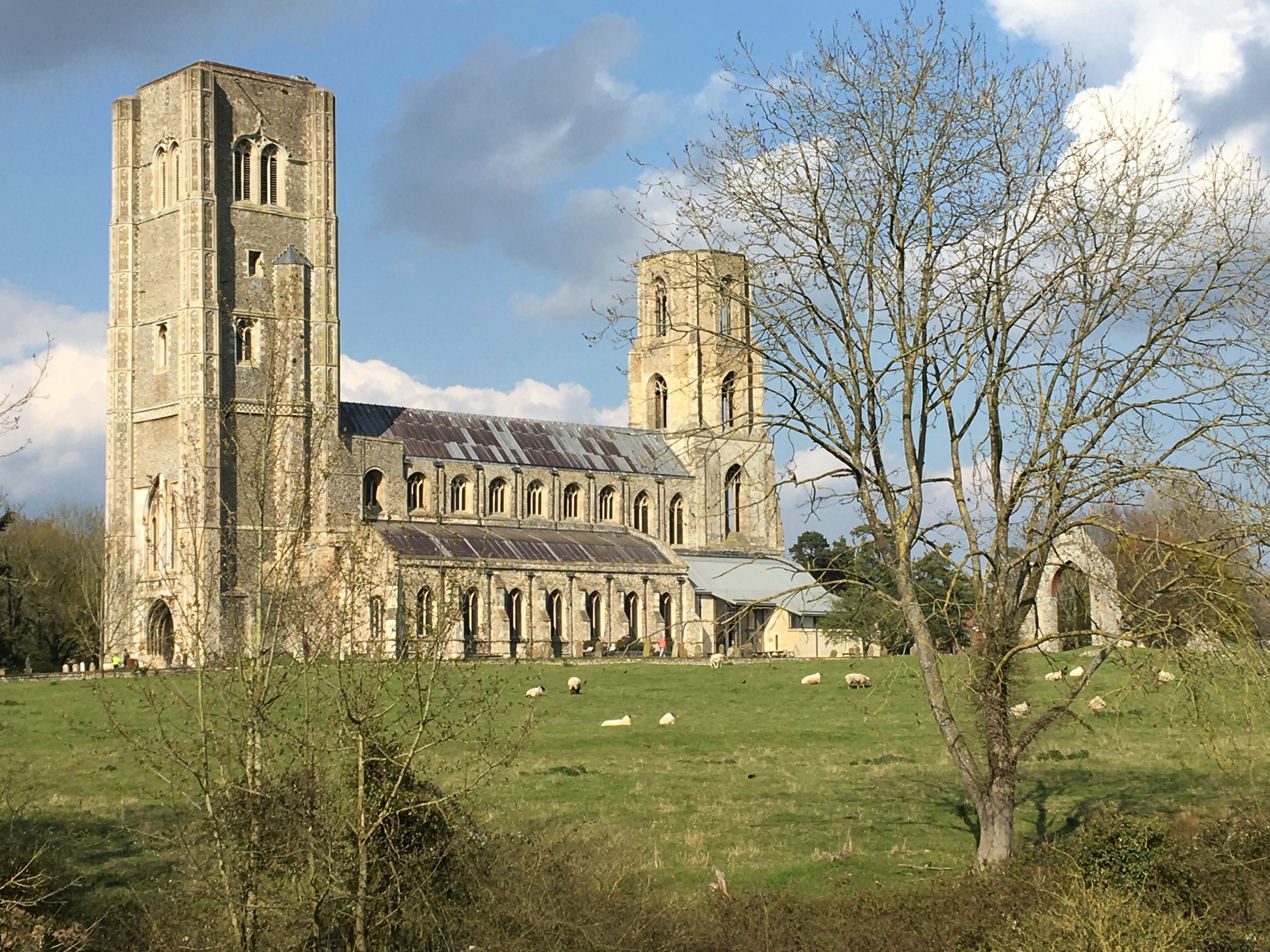
Wymondham Abbey from the south, viewed across the River Tiffey and Abbey Meadow

The Saxon church made way for a new Norman priory in 1107, its church shared between the monks and the townspeople. This evolved over the centuries into the Wymondham Abbey seen today.

Earthworks at Moot Hill are probably a medieval ring-work dating between 1088 and 1139. It is on the Historic England's Heritage at Risk register.

The first market charter came from King John in 1204, although an earlier market was probably held. The charter was renewed by Henry VI in 1440 and a weekly market is still held on Fridays.

=== Early modern period ===
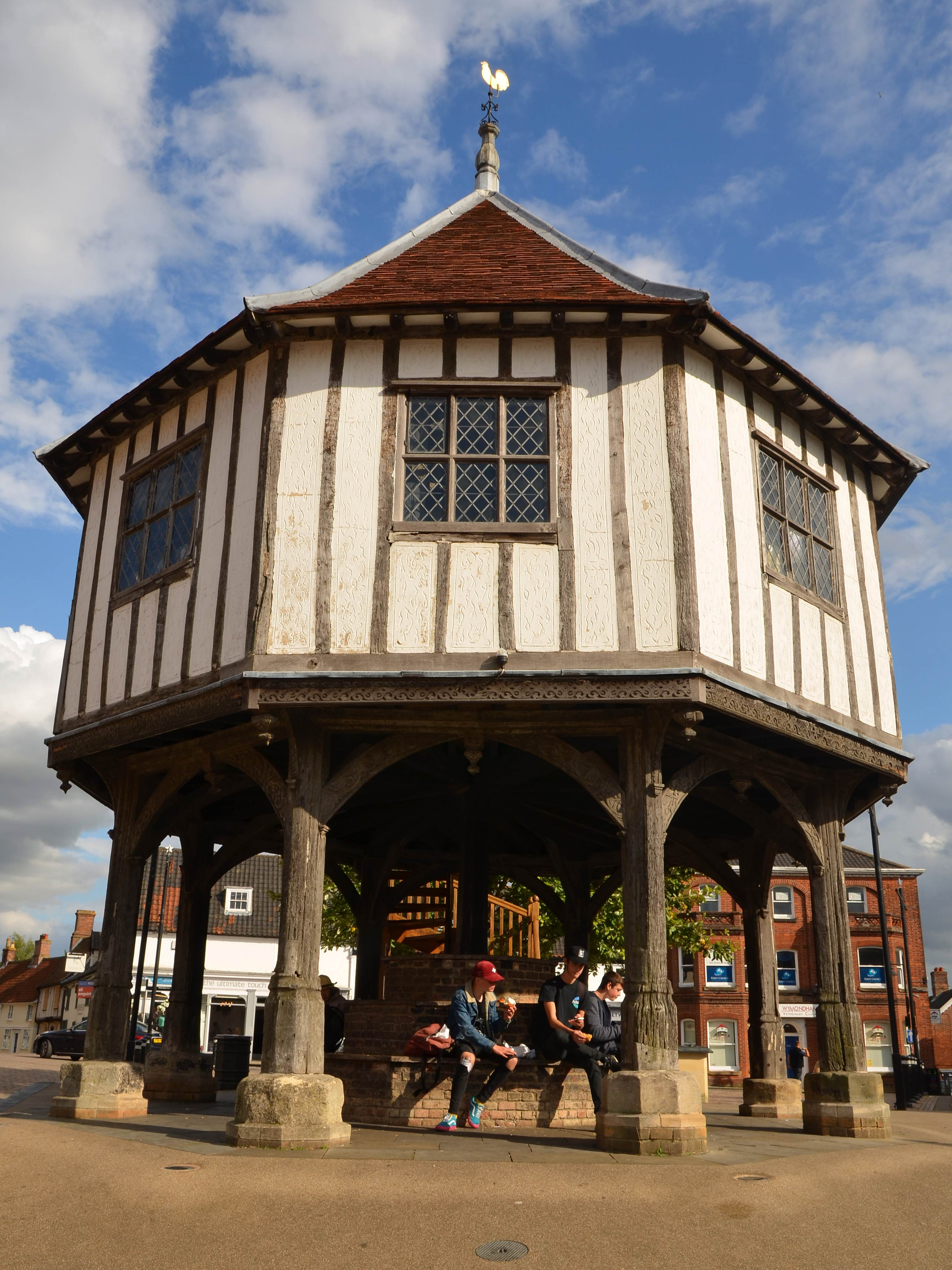
Wymondham Market Cross in September 2017

Wymondham Abbey was dissolved in 1538 and the domestic buildings and monastic half of the church were gradually demolished. Loye Ferrers, the last Abbot, became Vicar when the post fell vacant, and the remaining church buildings continued in use as the parish church.

Robert Kett led a rebellion in 1549 of peasants and small farmers against enclosure of common land. His force of scarcely armed men held the city of Norwich for six weeks until defeated by the King's forces. He was hanged at Norwich Castle and his brother William was hanged from the church west tower. Kett's Oak, ostensibly the rallying point of the rebellion, can be seen on the B1172 road between Wymondham and Hethersett, part of an earlier main road to London.

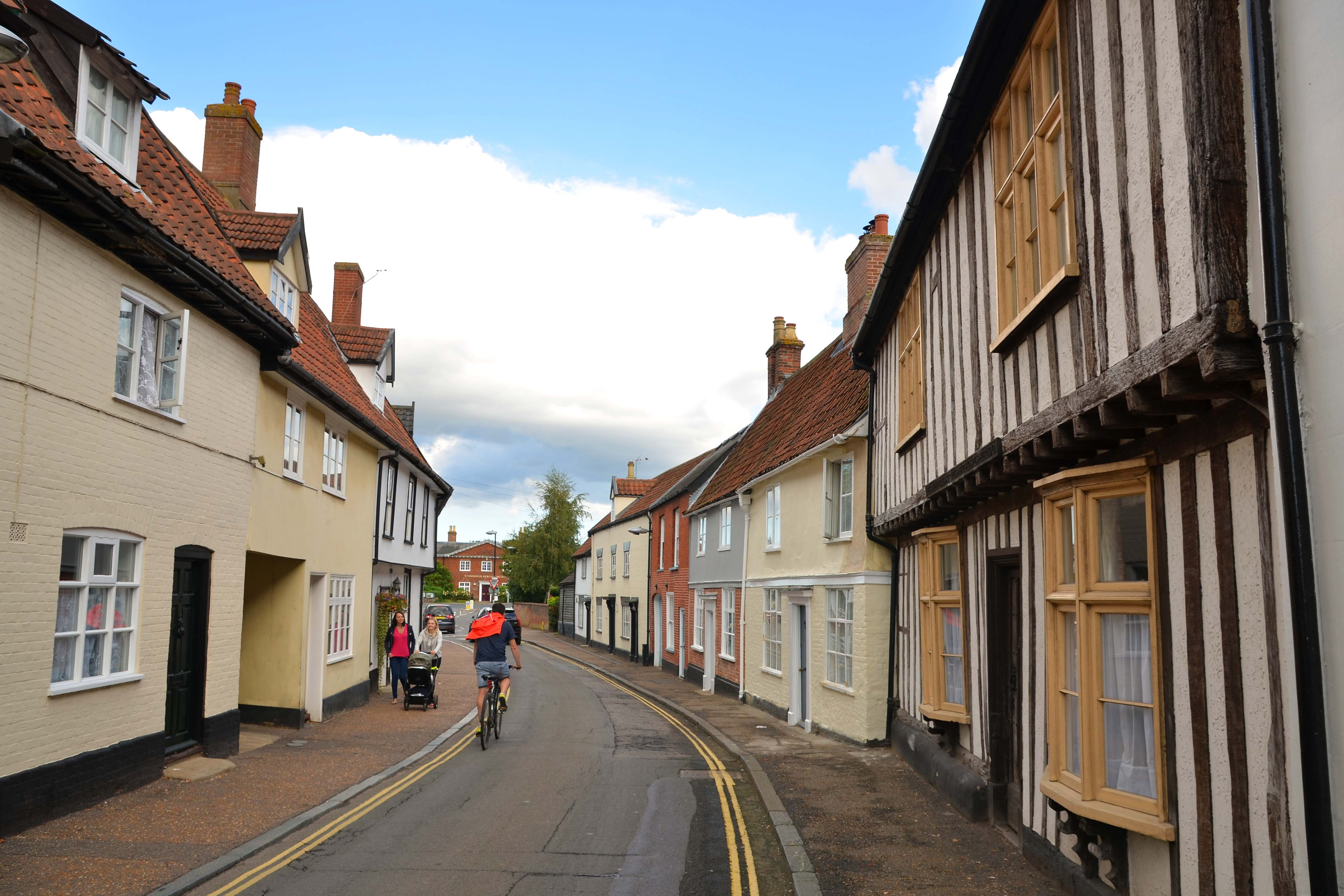
Bridewell Street in September 2017

The town suffered a major fire beginning on Sunday, 11 June 1615. Losses included the Market Cross, the vicarage, the old town hall and the schoolhouse. Buildings that survived include the Green Dragon inn. Thereafter, 327 inhabitants – some 55 per cent of residents at the time – made claims for lost goods and houses. The register of St Andrew's Church in Norwich records that John Flodder and others were executed for arson on 2 December 1615. Rebuilding varied in pace. A new Market Cross was completed in 1617, but in 1621 there were still some 15 properties to be rebuilt.

In 1695, the Attleborough road was the second British turnpike built, pre-dated only by the Great North Road.

=== Later Wymondham ===
In 1785, a prison was built in line with the ideas of the prison reformer John Howard. The first in England to have separate cells for prisoners, it was widely copied there and in the United States. It now serves as Wymondham Heritage Museum.

The collapse of the woollen industry in the mid-19th century led to poverty. In 1836 there were still 600 hand looms, but by 1845 only 60. The town became a backwater in Victorian times, untouched by development elsewhere.

The Norwich and Brandon Railway opened in 1845 and a branch north to Dereham and Wells-next-the-Sea in 1847. Another branch opened in 1881 ran south to the Great Eastern Main Line at Forncett.

The Murders at Stanfield Hall occurred on 28 November 1848.

In 1943, a military hospital at Morley was handed to the United States Army Air Forces. Over 3,000 patients were treated there after D-Day. It was later converted for use by Wymondham College.

For much of the 20th century, there were two brush factories together employing up to 1,000 people. They both closed in the 1980s and the land was turned over to housing.

== Governance ==
Wymondham has a town council responsible for local matters laid down by law, including a role in urban planning. It has 14 members elected every four years. Wymondham divides into four wards: North, East, Central and South. Spooner Row, though within the parish of Wymondham, elects its own community council.

Wymondham civil parish falls in the district of South Norfolk, returning six district councillors. In elections in May 2023, Wymondham elected three Liberal Democrat District councillors, two Conservatives and one Labour. In Town Council elections fourteen councillors are returned. After May 2023 local elections, the Town Council consisted of seven Liberal Democrats, four Labour, two Green and a solitary Conservative councillor. In 2023 the Town Council elected two women for the roles of mayor and deputy mayor, the first time this had occurred in Wymondham's history.

After a by-election for Central Wymondham held the same day as the General Election on 4 July 2024, another Liberal Democrat was elected bringing the total to eight on the Council.

In County Council elections, the north part, with the Town Centre, returns one councillor to Norfolk County Council as Wymondham electoral division. The southern part elects a county councillor as part of Forehoe electoral division.

For much of the 20th century, Wymondham belonged to the South Norfolk parliamentary constituency. After a boundary review, Wymondham was moved to the Mid Norfolk constituency. However, Wymondham will revert to South Norfolk again after another boundary review, a long drawn out process which was only formalised in late 2023.

== Geography ==
Wymondham

Climate chart (precipitation, max. and min. temperature)
J	F	M	A	M	J	J	A	S	O	N	D
56 7 1	43 7 1	50 10 3	44 13 4	49 16 7	58 19 10	58 22 12	56 22 12	58 19 10	67 15 7	66 10 4	58 7 2
- █ Average max. and min. temperatures in °C
- █ Precipitation totals in mm
- Source: Met Office, Morley St Botolph UK climate averages, www.metoffice.gov.uk
Imperial conversion
J	F	M	A	M	J	J	A	S	O	N	D
2.2 44 35	1.7 45 34	2 50 37	1.7 55 39	1.9 61 44	2.3 66 49	2.3 71 53	2.2 72 53	2.3 66 50	2.6 58 45	2.6 50 39	2.3 45 35
- █ Average max. and min. temperatures in °F
- █ Precipitation totals in inches

At 52°34′12″N 1°6′57.6″E (52.57°, 1.116°), and 91 miles (146 km) north-north-west of London, Wymondham stands 134.5 feet (41 m) above sea level, 9 miles (14.5 km) south-west of Norwich, at the confluence of two small rivers. The largely rural parishes around it include Hethersett, Hethel, Ashwellthorpe, Bunwell, Wicklewood, Crownthorpe and Wramplingham. The market town of Attleborough lies to the south-west. Wymondham has a temperate maritime climate, like much of the British Isles, with relatively cool summers and mild winters. There is regular but generally light precipitation throughout the year. Wymondham was struck by an F1/T2 tornado on 23 November 1981, as part of the record-breaking nationwide tornado outbreak on that day.

Wymondham's topography is marked by its river meadow and flat, low-lying agricultural landscape, much like the rest of East Anglia. The parish has an area of 17.11 square miles (44.31 km^{2}). The geology is based on chalk, with a layer of boulder clay laid down in the last ice age. The River Tiffey, flowing north, forms a boundary between the built-up town centre and the rural southern part of the parish.

The built environment of Wymondham's town centre is marked by early-modern town houses and a number of buildings that survived the 1615 fire, including Wymondham Abbey. Much of the centre forms a conservation area with numerous listed buildings. Beyond the centre lie 20th and 21st-century housing estates of mainly detached and semi-detached properties. There are trading and industrial estates along the route of the A11, which passes north-east through the south of the parish. The heavy rail Breckland line crosses the parish in the same direction. The rest of the parish is largely arable farmland.

The parish has one of the largest areas in Norfolk. It includes swaths to the north and south of the town, including the hamlets of Suton, Silfield, Spooner Row and Wattlefield.

=== Climate ===
Climate data for Morley St Botolph (1991–2020)
Month	Jan	Feb	Mar	Apr	May	Jun	Jul	Aug	Sep	Oct	Nov	Dec	Year
Mean daily maximum °C (°F)	7.1 (44.8)	7.7 (45.9)	10.3 (50.5)	13.6 (56.5)	16.7 (62.1)	19.6 (67.3)	22.2 (72.0)	22.4 (72.3)	19.0 (66.2)	14.7 (58.5)	10.3 (50.5)	7.5 (45.5)	14.3 (57.7)
Mean daily minimum °C (°F)	1.7 (35.1)	1.7 (35.1)	2.9 (37.2)	4.5 (40.1)	7.2 (45.0)	9.9 (49.8)	12.2 (54.0)	12.0 (53.6)	10.0 (50.0)	7.6 (45.7)	4.3 (39.7)	2.0 (35.6)	6.4 (43.5)
Average rainfall mm (inches)	54.5 (2.15)	46.8 (1.84)	48.6 (1.91)	39.9 (1.57)	48.5 (1.91)	57.6 (2.27)	60.0 (2.36)	60.1 (2.37)	60.1 (2.37)	66.9 (2.63)	69.5 (2.74)	63.9 (2.52)	676.3 (26.63)
Average rainy days (≥ 1 mm)	11.8	10.4	9.8	9.3	8.4	9.5	9.9	9.6	9.2	11.2	12.6	12.2	123.9
Mean monthly sunshine hours	61.8	81.5	122.8	173.8	210.8	196.4	207.4	188.7	144.9	109.6	67.5	58.0	1,623.3
Source: Met Office

== Demography ==
Wymondham compared
UK Census 2011	Wymondham	England
Total population	14,405	53,012,456
Foreign born	5.6%	17.57%
White British	94.5%	85.4%
Asian	1.1%	7.8%
White Irish	0.5%	1%
Black	0.3%	3.5%
Christian	60.3%	59.4%
No religion	29.9%	24.7%
Muslim	0.5%	5%
Buddhist	0.3%	0.5%
Hindu	0.2%	1.5%
Over 65	20.2%	16.33%
Unemployed	2.9%	4.4%

The United Kingdom Census 2001 gave Wymondham a total resident population of 12,539 and a population density of 733 per square mile (283/km^{2}). By 2011, the population had risen to 14,405, with a density of 840 per square mile (320/km^{2}). Wymondham has an average age of 41.8.

In 2011, 94.5 per cent of the population were White British, 1.1 per cent Asian, 0.5 per cent White Irish and 0.3 per cent Black.

Christianity accounts for 60.3 per cent of the population, while 29.9 declare no religious affiliation. There are small populations of Muslims (0.5%), Buddhists (0.3%) and Hindus (0.2%).

The 2011 census showed 72.6 per cent of the adult population economically active, 2.9 per cent unemployed and 16.8 per cent retired. The population is well-educated: 27 per cent have post-18 qualifications.

The following table outlines the population change in the town since 1801, with slow growth, then decline in the 19th century, followed by recovery and rapid growth by the end of the 20th century.

Year	1801	1811	1821	1831	1841	1851	1881	1891	1901	1911	1921	1931	1939	1951	1961	1971	1981	1991	2001	2011
Population	3,567	3,923	4,708	5,485	5,179	5,177	4,566	4,764	4,733	4,794	4,814	5,017	5,957	5,665	5,904	8,513	9,759	10,869	12,539	14,405
Sources: A Vision of Britain through Time: Civil Parish A Vision of Britain through Time: Urban District Wymondham - A Century Remembered

== Economy ==
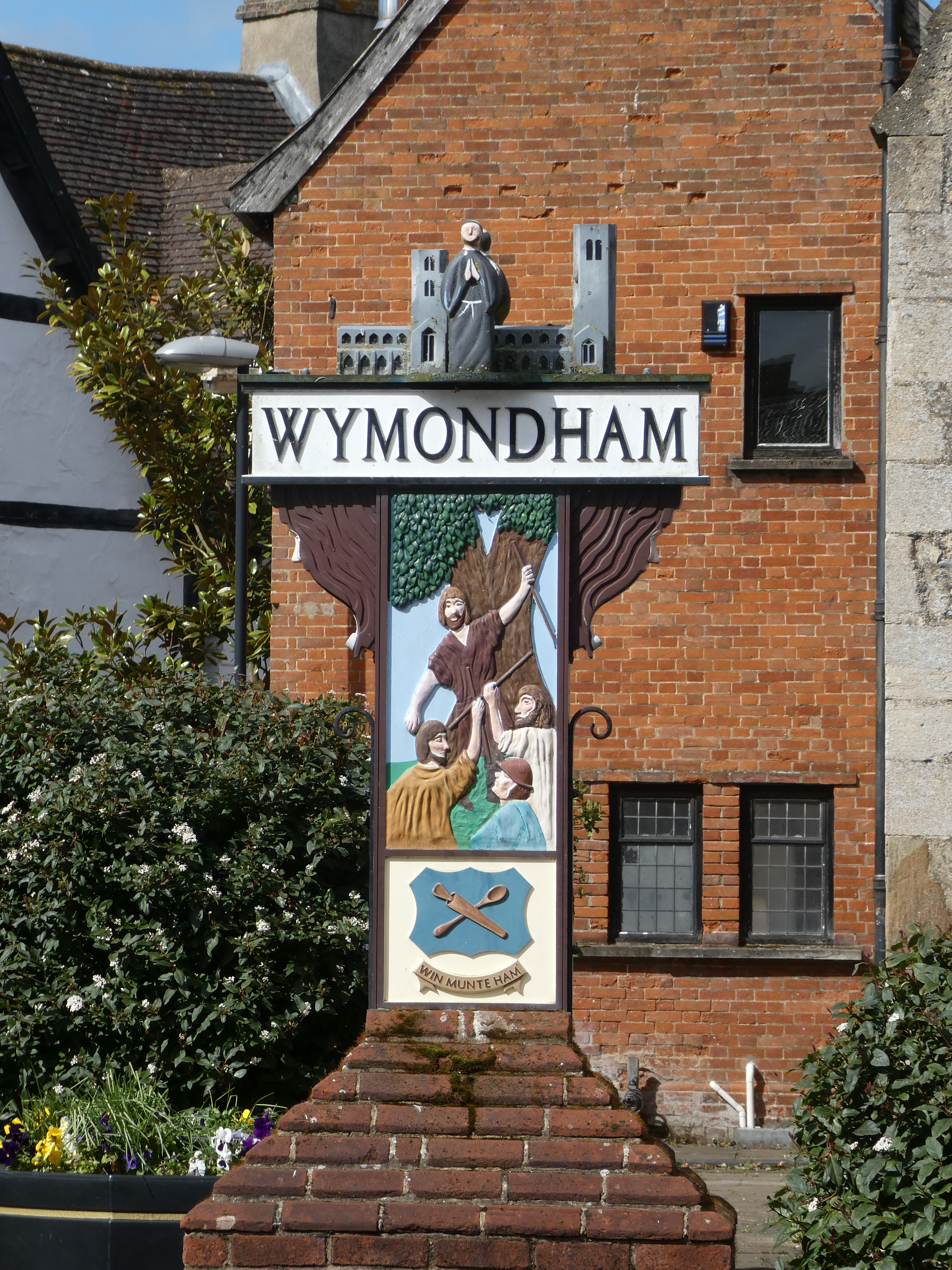
The Wymondham town sign

Wymondham is a commuter town mainly for Norwich, Cambridge and London. The 2011 census reported as the commonest employment sectors the wholesale and retail trade (15.4%), health and social work (13.6%) and education (11.3%).

A major employer is Norfolk Constabulary. There is a retail area centred on the market square, with national-chain branches and independent shops and businesses. Traditionally, Wymondham was a centre of woodturning and brush-making; a spigot and spoon feature on the town sign to mark this. Major brush factories appeared, with railway sidings, saw mills and engineering workshops. These closed in late 20th century and were developed as housing.

== Landmarks ==
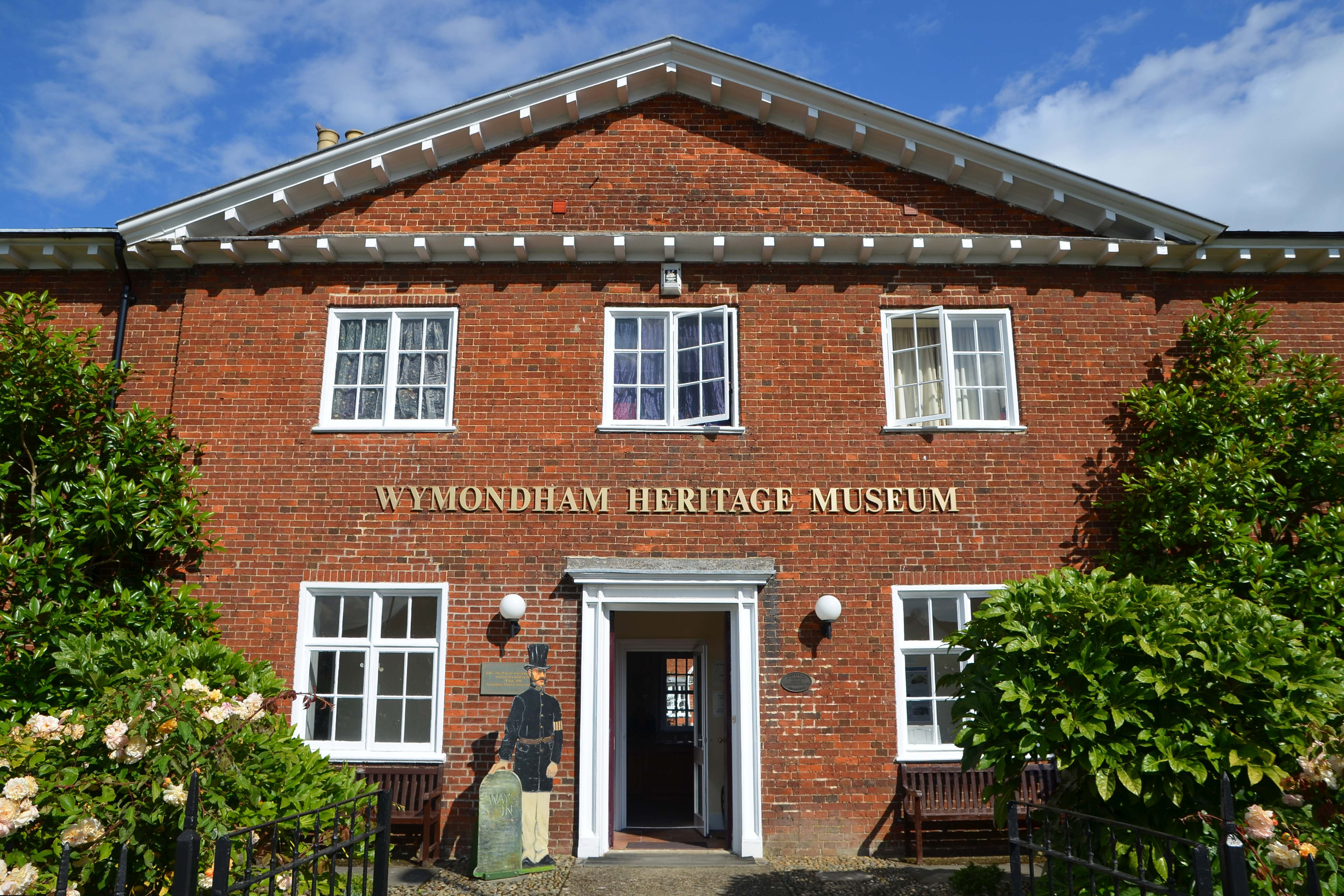
Wymondham Heritage Museum in September 2017

=== War memorial ===
Wymondham war memorial is a 7.5 metres (8 yd) stone obelisk above an octagonal three-stepped base, at the junction of Vicar Street, Town Green and Middleton Street. Unveiled on 24 July 1921, and updated after World War II, it recalls 189 military and civilian deaths in the two World Wars. It is a Grade II listed feature.

=== Wymondham Abbey ===
Wymondham Abbey, founded in 1107, is a Grade I listed building. Originally a Benedictine priory, it became an independent abbey in 1449. During this period the two-tower design evolved. The east tower was built first to an octagonal design (1409) and the west tower completed in 1498.

The abbey was dissolved in 1538, after which many of its buildings were demolished. Their remains, including the surviving arch of the chapter house, are scattered around the church. The open land to the south of the church, above further remains of the medieval abbey, is a scheduled monument. The east end of the church was demolished at the dissolution. The surviving 70 metres (77 yd)-long building is about half the original length.

The remainder survived the dissolution and continued in use as the local Church of England parish church. Some elements of the original Norman architecture are visible externally, while internally a 15th-century hammerbeam roof and a reredos by Ninian Comper can be seen.

=== Cavick House ===
Cavick House, a Grade I listed building, dates from the early 18th century. It is a red-brick building with painted quoins and some original interior decoration. It had fallen into disrepair by 1999, but has since been restored. The nearby Cavick House Farmhouse, built in the early 18th century, is a Grade II listed building.

=== Beckett's Chapel ===
Beckett's Chapel is thought to have been founded in the late 12th century by the son of William d'Aubigny and founder of Wymondham Abbey. The current chapel dates largely to about 1400, when it was rebuilt. In the post-Reformation period it was turned into a school and also used for a time as a lock-up for remand prisoners. Restoration in 1873 was followed by use as a public hall, a school and Wymondham's library. In 1999, a plaque was attached to mark the 450th anniversary of Kett's Rebellion. In 2008, it became Wymondham Arts Centre. Original elements of the chapel, including an arch-braced hammerbeam roof, are still visible inside. It is a Grade I listed building. In 2018, it was placed on Historic England's Heritage at Risk register, as it suffers from damp and is slowly decaying.

=== The Market Cross ===
The Market Cross was built in 1617–1618 after the original was destroyed in the fire of 1615. It is a timber-framed octagonal building with an upper floor raised above an open undercroft. It served as the centre of administration of the town's weekly market. In the late 19th century it was converted into a subscription reading room. After restoration in 1989, it reopened as the town's Tourist Information Centre. It is a Grade I listed building.

=== Listed buildings ===
==== Grade II* listed buildings ====
The six Grade II* listed buildings in Wymondham are The Green Dragon pub, Kimberley Hall, Priory House, Stanfield Hall, The Chestnuts and 3 Market Street.

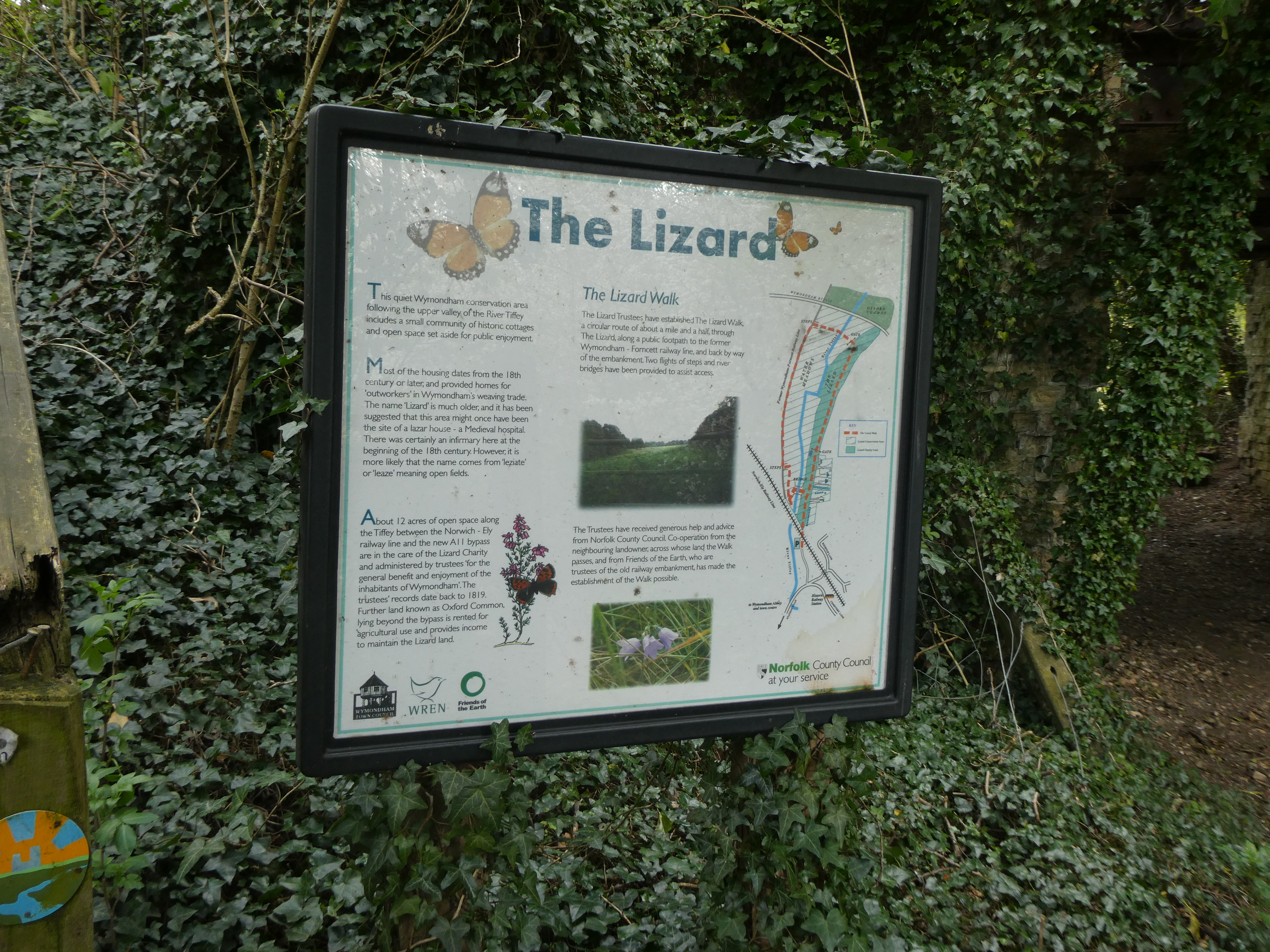
A sign about The Lizard conservation area

=== Windmills ===
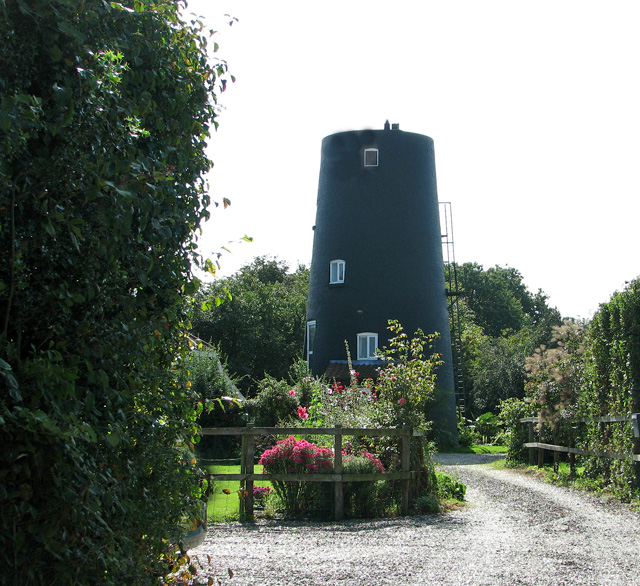
Silfield Mill, Wymondham

Wymondham has had several windmills. The tower of one mill survives in residential use. The mills were:-

- A post mill belonging to Wymondham Priory was standing before 1193.
- A post mill at North Field. Standing in 1627 and demolished c.1804.
- A tower mill at North Field. Built c.1804 and demolished in 1858.
- North Mill, a smock mill moved from Dilham in 1858. Working until it burnt down on 17 February 1950.
- A post mill at Silfield. Standing in 1675 and last known being offered to let in November 1861.
- A post mill at Suton. Standing in 1675 and last known being offered for sale by auction in January 1870.
- A post mill at Norwood Common. Described as "lately blown down" in March 1764.
- A windmill at an unknown location in Wymondham, likely a post mill. Standing between 1702 and 1808.
- A post mill at Norwood Common. Built in 1764 and burnt down in November 1805.
- A post mill at Browick. Standing in 1771 and demolished c.1892.
- A smock mill at Browick. Built c.1829 and working until November 1926. Demolished in 1949.
- A tower mill at Silfield. Built c.1850 and dismantled in 1911. The tower survives, in residential use.

=== Other landmarks ===
The former jail, known as Wymondham Bridewell, was built in 1787. It houses the Wymondham Heritage Museum. having once been a police station and a law court. It is a Grade II listed building.

Wymondham railway station, built in 1844, retains much of its atmosphere, including a timber signal box for semaphore signalling from 1877, in use until 2012. Almost derelict by 1988, the site was transformed by the local businessman and railway enthusiast David Turner, who restored the buildings and ran a Brief Encounter-themed restaurant on Platform 1 before retiring in 2011. The station was voted Best Small Station in the 2006 National Rail Awards. Both station and signal box are Grade II listed buildings.

Toll's Meadow is a nature reserve and wildlife site with footpaths along the River Tiffey. Wildlife there includes kingfishers, herons, roe deer and water voles. The Lizard is a conservation area and wildlife site managed locally as a "piece of informal, natural countryside for the general benefit and enjoyment of the people of Wymondham". The Tiffey Trails offer accessible walks, interpretation boards, wood-carvings, benches and waymarkers. In Spring 2022, a new Ketts County trail was added, forming a 16-mile walk starting at Becketswell near the Abbey. This is part of the wider 500 mile plus Norfolk Trails network.

== Transport ==
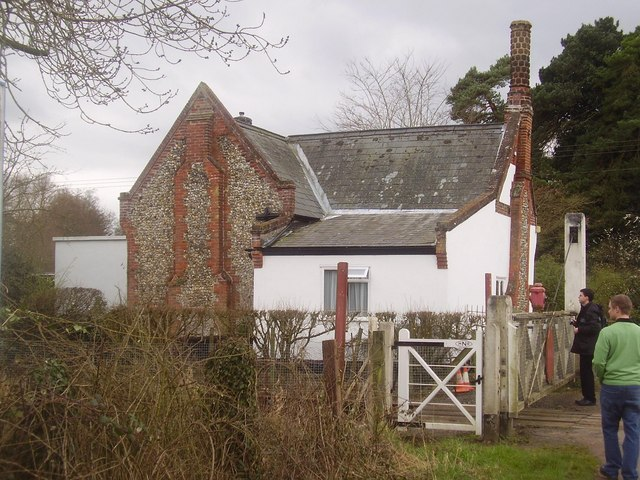
Flint was used in many types of buildings around Wymondham, including this 19th-century crossing keeper's hut on the Mid-Norfolk Railway

The Breckland line runs through the parish, with stations at Wymondham and Spooner Row. The typical service is one train an hour east to Norwich and one train west, alternating between Cambridge and Stansted Airport. Three stopping trains a day are provided by East Midlands Railway; these run either to/from Liverpool Lime Street, Nottingham or Sheffield.

The Mid-Norfolk Railway operates a station at Wymondham Abbey for heritage services to Dereham, along a section of the branch to Wells. The town once had a third station, Spinks Lane, which closed shortly after opening in the 19th century.

Buses by First Norfolk & Suffolk offer at least a 30-minute service to Hethersett, Norwich and Attleborough. Konectbus serves the Norfolk and Norwich University Hospital, Norwich and Watton. National Express coach services are available to London.

The A11 trunk road from Norwich to London once ran through the town centre. The B1135 passes the northern edge of the town on its way to Dereham.

== Sport ==
Wymondham Town Football Club, founded in 1883, is based at Kings Head Meadow. The senior men's team plays in the Anglian Combination Division Three South They have topped the league five times, most recently in 2017–18. The club last won the Norfolk Senior Cup in 1888–89. Ian Gibson MP played for the club in the 1965–66 season. The senior women's team plays in the Eastern Region Women's Football League, which it won in 2017–18. In the same season it won the County Cup, which it successfully defended in 2018–19.

Wymondham Town United Football Club, based at Kett's Park, is one Norfolk's largest youth teams, with over 600 players across 22 teams.

Wymondham Rugby Club was founded in 1972 at the Foster Harrison Memorial Ground on Tuttles Lane. A new ground, Barnard Fields, opened in 2018. The senior men's team plays in the London 2 North East league, winning the Norfolk Plate in 2015–16. The senior women's team, Wymondham Wasps, plays in the Championship 2 Midlands League.

Wymondham Dell Bowls Club was a founder member of Norfolk Bowls Association in 1936. It has won the Bales Cup and the County League more often than any other club in Norfolk: twelve and fifteen times respectively. The members include the 2002 Commonwealth Games gold medallist, John Ottaway.

== Media ==
Local news and television programmes are provided by BBC East and ITV Anglia. Television signals are received from the Tacolneston TV transmitter. Local radio stations are BBC Radio Norfolk, Heart East, Greatest Hits Radio East (formerly Radio Norwich 99.9), Kiss and South Norfolk Radio, a community based station which broadcast from the town. The town is served by the local newspaper, The Wymondham and Attleborough Mercury including the regional newspaper Eastern Daily Press.

== Education ==
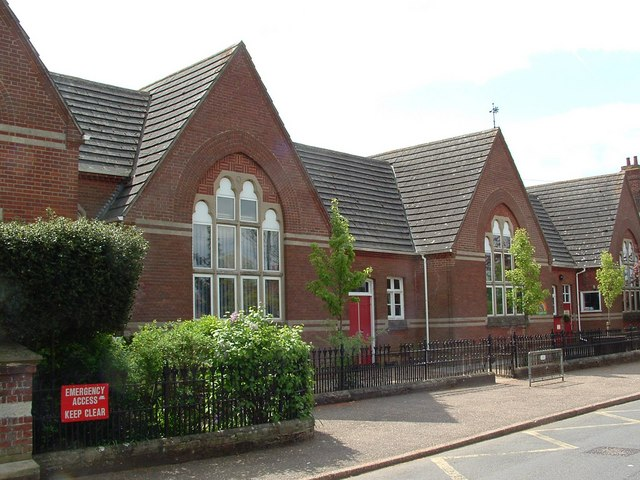
Browick Road School, Wymondham

Wymondham Grammar School was founded in 1567 by the Norwich-born Archbishop of Canterbury, Matthew Parker. It was originally housed in Beckett's Chapel, then moved to Priory House, and closed in 1903. Silfield School opened in 1876 and closed in 1993. It is now a private dwelling.

Wymondham High Academy is located near the town centre. Wymondham College, one of England's largest boarding schools in England, stands just outside the parish in Morley.

The five state primary schools are Ashleigh Primary School and Nursery, Browick Road Primary and Nursery School, Robert Kett Primary School, Spooner Row Primary School and Silfield Oak Primary Academy.

== Public services ==
Policing in Wymondham is provided by Norfolk Constabulary, which is headquartered in the town. Statutory emergency fire and rescue service is provided by the Norfolk Fire and Rescue Service, which has a station in London Road.

The nearest NHS hospital is Norfolk and Norwich University Hospital in Norwich, administered by Norfolk and Norwich University Hospitals NHS Foundation Trust. In the town itself are Wymondham Health Centre and Wymondham Medical Centre offering general-practice care. Ambulance services are provided by East of England Ambulance Service.

Waste management is co-ordinated by South Norfolk Council. Locally produced inert waste for disposal is processed into fuel for use in combined heat and power facilities in Europe. Wymondham's distribution network operator for electricity is UK Power Networks; there are no power stations in the town. Drinking water and waste water are managed by Anglian Water. There is a water treatment plant to the north-west of the town.

== Culture and community ==
=== Culture ===
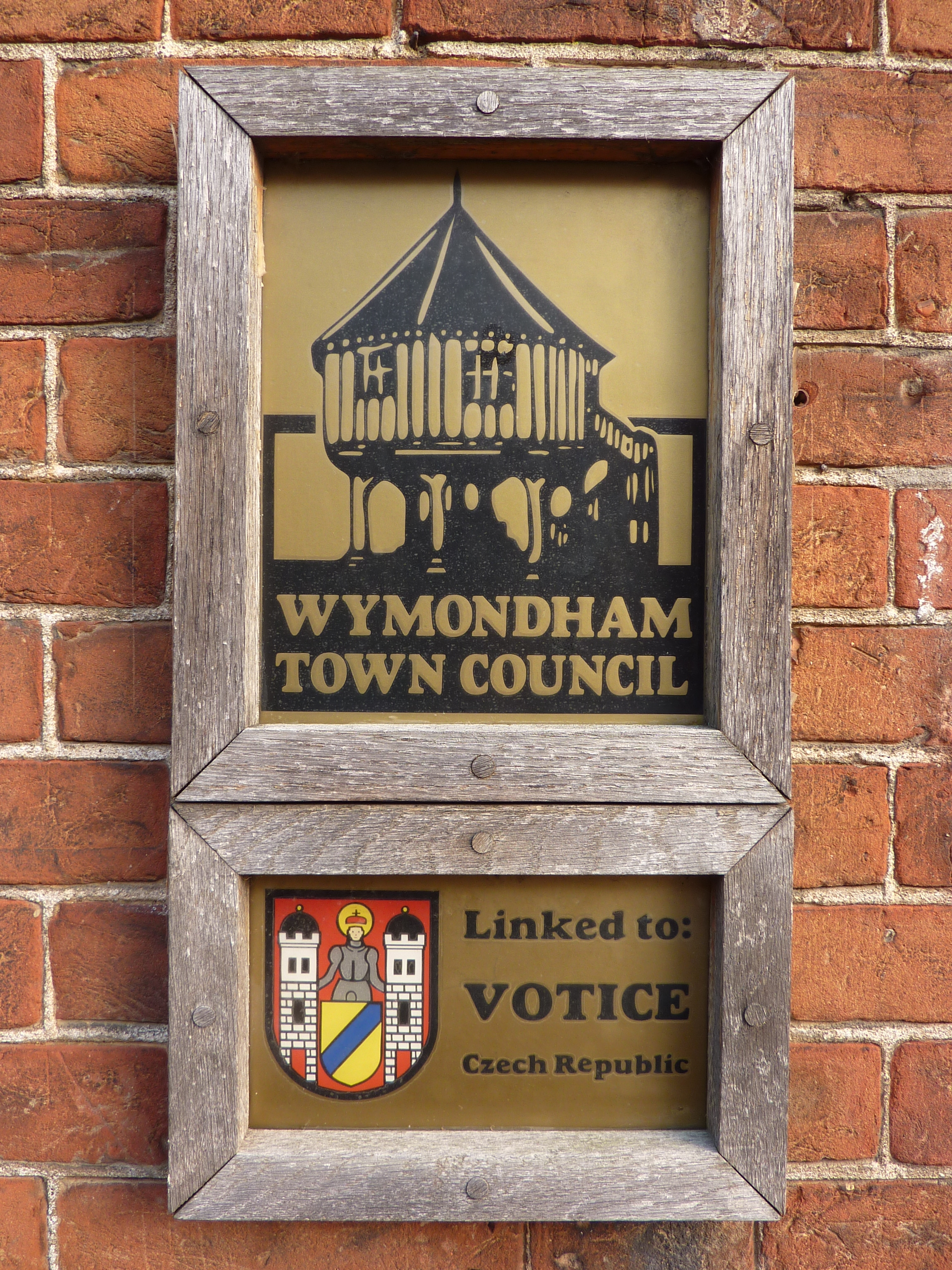
Plaque commemorating links with Votice on Wymondham Town Hall

Wymondham Heritage Museum, in the former prison, has permanent displays on Robert Kett, brush-making and the museum building. Occasional displays are renewed every season. Wymondham Arts Centre, in Beckett's Chapel, runs a summer programme of free exhibitions by local and regional artists. Regular arts and theatre events take place in Wymondham Central Hall.

The Town's historic pubs include The Green Dragon, one of England's oldest, open since about 1371. The Cross Keys Inn in the Market Place occupies an early 17th-century Grade II listed building.

There are many community groups and charities offering a wide range of activities and volunteering opportunities for locals.

Wymondham Music Festival, begun in 1996, ran mostly free summer events at several venues with a Midsummer Jazz Picnic at Becketswell every June. Occasional events in the past included a carnival and a winter Dickensian Evening.

Wymondham currently has no twin town. Links were developed in the 1990s with Votice and local dignitaries from the Czech Republic visited Wymondham. A plaque on the former Wymondham Town Hall in Middleton Street commemorates the links between the two. (The new Town Hall building is located at nearby Ketts Park).

=== Community facilities ===
The many parks and playgrounds, include Toll's Meadow – an area of rare UK lowland meadow- Kett's Park which boasts an artificial 3G pitch, part-funded by South Norfolk Council and the Premier League, opened in 2019 by Norwich City player Grant Holt. Browick Road Recreational Park features a skatepark and cycle pump track, facilities which are due for a revamp for the whole park. One section of Browick is being developed as a community orchard by volunteers. The public library moved from Beckett's Chapel to purpose-built premises in 2008. It hosts events to encourage learning and reading, such as weekly Bounce and Rhyme sessions.

== Religious sites ==
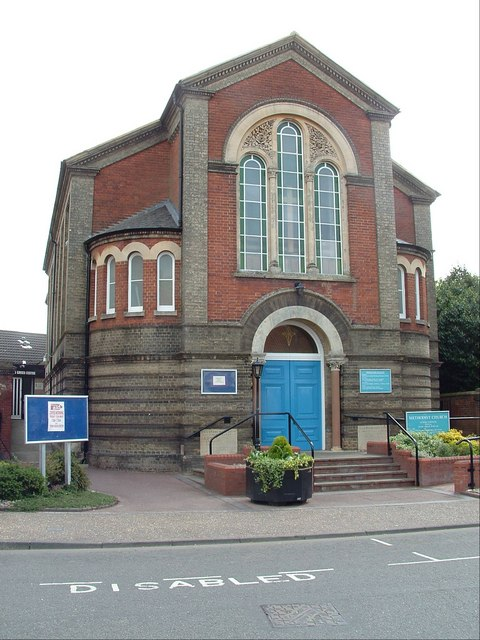
Wymondham Methodist Church

The two Church of England churches are Wymondham Abbey – at first dedicated to the Virgin Mary but after the martyrdom of St Thomas Becket in 1170, his name was added – and a chapel-of-ease, Holy Trinity Church, in Spooner Row.

The building of a 17th-century Quaker meeting house Chapel Lane survives as a private residence. Fairland United Reformed Church was founded in 1652. The current façade dates from 1877. It has regular Sunday services.

A Primitive Methodist chapel built in Silfield Street in 1867 is now a private residence. A Wesleyan Methodist chapel built in Damgate Street in 1879 is now used by Freemasons. Wymondham Methodist Church was built in 1870. Wymondham Baptist Church has been at its current Queen Street site since 1910. It holds regular Sunday services and a successful twice weekly community café called Roots.

The Roman Catholic Church of Our Lady and St Thomas of Canterbury, built in 1952, contains a memorial to World War II prisoners and internees of the Japanese who did not survive their imprisonment. An annual memorial service is held every May. A digital and print archive of 61,000 names of those who died is maintained by the church.

The two churches of the Evangelical Alliance are Hope Community Church in Ayton Road and Alive Church which meets at Central Hall. There is a Kingdom Hall of Jehovah's Witnesses in Harts Farm Road.

== Notable people ==
Wymondham people are sometimes known as Wymondhamers.

- Several MPs were connected to Wymondham: John Payn MP (died 1402), John Wildman MP (c. 1621–1693), Edwin Gooch MP (1889–1964) and Bert Hazell MP (1907–2009).
- Robert Kett (c. 1492–1549), leader of Kett's Rebellion, was a yeoman farmer from Wymondham. He and his brother William have roads named after them in north Wymondham.
- Robert Kett's nephew, Francis Kett (c. 1547–1589), also from Wymondham, was burned in a ditch of Norwich Castle for denying Christ's divinity.
- John Wodehouse, 1st Earl of Kimberley (1826–1902), a Whig and Liberal politician after whom Kimberley, South Africa was named, was born in Wymondham.
- Thomas Jeckyll (1827–1881), architect and pioneer Japonaiserie interior designer
- Notable sporting personalities include the cricketer Philip Fryer (1870–1950) and the bowls player and 2002 Commonwealth Games gold medallist John Ottaway (born 1955). Other sporting Wymondhamers are James Hubbard (born 1992), the PDC darts player and 2012 World Youth champion, and Aimee Palmer (born 2000), professional footballer in the Super League.
- Harry Daniels (1884–1953), soldier and Victoria Cross recipient, born in the town, received his medal for valiant action in the World War I Battle of Neuve Chapelle. A road in Silfield is named after him.
- Ethel Gooch (1887–1953), wife of Edwin Gooch, was the town's first woman councillor and the first woman to chair Wymondham Urban District Council. Roads in the town are named after her and her husband.
- W. G. Sebald (1944–2001), German-born writer and academic, lived in the town.
- George Szirtes (born 1948), a Hungarian-born poet and translator, lives in the town.
- Adam Buxton (born 1969), a comedian and actor, has lived in Wymondham since 2004.

== Cultural references ==
The Murders at Stanfield Hall were depicted in the 1948 film Blanche Fury.

The now-closed Brief Encounter-themed restaurant at Wymondham railway station featured in Mark Greenstreet's 1996 comedy film Caught in the Act, starring Sara Crowe, Annette Badland and Nadia Sawalha.

The eighth in C. J. Sansom's Shardlake series of novels, Tombland (2018), has the protagonist embroiled in Kett's Rebellion.
