= Both Lives Matter =

Anti-abortion organisation in Northern Ireland

- Type: Anti-abortion advocacy
- Headquarters: Belfast
- Website: bothlivesmatter.org

Both Lives Matter is an advocacy organisation in Northern Ireland which claims to advocate for both the lives of the woman and the unborn child in every pregnancy. Its stated aims are to "re-frame the abortion debate in Northern Ireland and beyond, to advocate for better care in pregnancy crisis, to create a life-affirming culture that values each woman and her unborn child and to safe-guard the current law which protects both women and unborn children". The organisation was established in 2017 and co-founded by Dawn McAvoy. It was originally a collaborative movement co-founded by three organisations, but is now an initiative within the Evangelical Alliance UK operating under the shortened name Both Lives. In continuity with Both Lives Matter, the logo of Both Lives describes it as both "pro-women" and "pro-life".

Both Lives Matter conducted a billboard campaign in two locations in Northern Ireland in January 2017 featuring the headline: "100,000 people are alive today because of our laws on abortion. Why change that?". This refers to abortions not performed due to Northern Ireland's exclusion from the Abortion Act, passed in 1967. In response to the placement of the billboards, 14 complaints were being lodged with the Advertising Standards Authority, which were dismissed on the grounds that while the claim was an "estimate", "On balance, we concluded that the evidence indicated that there was a reasonable probability that around 100,000 people were alive in Northern Ireland today who would have otherwise been aborted had it been legal to do so".

The '100,000' billboard campaign won the Northern Ireland Public Affairs Campaign of the Year for 2017, awarded by the Public Relations and Communications Association. It was the only campaign in the running for the award.

The group has been criticised for "hijacking Black Lives Matter"; in The Guardian, Elizabeth Nelson of the Belfast Feminist Network described it as "a cynical attempt to spin the language of human rights into froth to hide their true agenda – the subjugation of women".

== See also ==
- Society for the Protection of Unborn Children
