= Wramplingham =

Village in Norfolk, England

Coordinates: 52.61339°N 1.11814°E

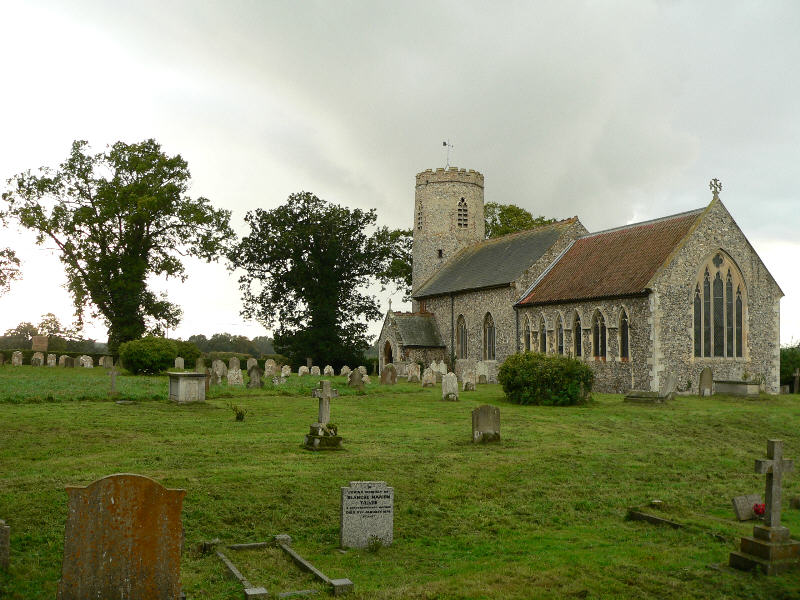
- St Peter and Paul church

- Location within Norfolk
- Area: 3.47 km^{2} (1.34 sq mi)
- Population: 115 (2011)
  - Density: 33/km^{2} (85/sq mi)
- OS grid reference: TG112063
- Civil parish: Wramplingham
- District: South Norfolk
- Shire county: Norfolk
- Region: East
- Country: England
- Sovereign state: United Kingdom
- Post town: WYMONDHAM
- Postcode district: NR18
- Dialling code: 01603
- Police: Norfolk
- Fire: Norfolk
- Ambulance: East of England

Wramplingham is a village and civil parish in the English county of Norfolk. It is situated on the River Tiffey some 4 miles (6.4 km) north of Wymondham and 7 miles (11 km) west of Norwich. The civil parish has an area of 3.47 square kilometres and in 2001 had a population of 110 in 44 households, increasing to a population of 115 in 51 households at the 2011 Census. For the purposes of local government, the parish falls within the district of South Norfolk.

== Heritage ==
The village name means "Homestead/village" or "hemmed-in land", with an obscure first element that is possibly a folk-name or place-name.

The church of Wramplingham St Peter and St Paul is one of 124 existing round-tower churches in Norfolk.

Wramplingham Mill was a three-storey weatherboarded corn mill, demolished in 1945.

Bill Bryson (born 1951), a British-American writer who gained immense popularity, lived in Wramplingham at the Old Rectory between 2003 and 2013.
