= Wymondham Town Hall =

Municipal building in Wymondham, Norfolk, England

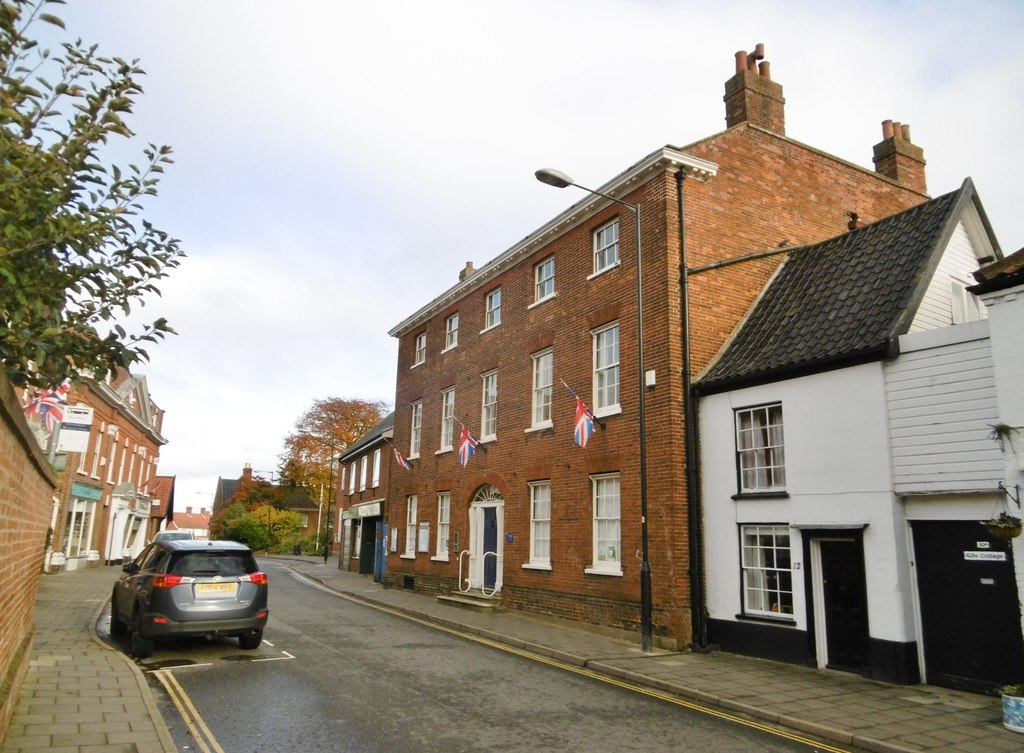
- The building in 2016

- Shown in Norfolk
- 52.5712°N 1.1105°E
- Location: Middleton Street, Wymondham

History
- Built: c.1820

Site notes
- Architectural style: Neoclassical style

Listed Building – Grade II
- Official name: Town hall
- Designated: 29 December 1950
- Reference no.: 1196687

Wymondham Town Hall is a municipal building in Middleton Street in Wymondham, a town in Norfolk, in England. The building, which is currently vacant and is being actively marketed for sale, is a Grade II listed building.

== History ==
The first town hall was a medieval structure which burnt down when a major fire swept through the town on 11 June 1615. It was replaced by a second town hall, which was deemed inadequate by the early 19th century and needed to be replaced. Like the earlier buildings, the current building was purpose-built as a town hall. It was designed in the neoclassical style, built in red brick and was completed in about 1820. The architectural historian, Nikolaus Pevsner, noted that, despite its municipal purpose, it resembled a large town house.

After the local rural sanitary authority was succeeded by Wymondham Urban District Council in 1894, the new civic leaders decided to establish their offices and meeting place within the town hall. The building continued to serve in that capacity for much of the 20th century, but ceased to be the local seat of government when South Norfolk District Council was formed at Farthing Green House in Loddon in 1974. It was subsequently occupied by Wymondham Town Council, which leased the building from South Norfolk District Council. After links were developed with Votice in the 1990s, local dignitaries from the Czech Republic visited Wymondham and a plaque was placed on the front of the building to commemorate the relationship.

The town council increasingly found the town hall expensive and inefficient to operate and consequently re-located to a new building on its own land at Ketts Park in spring 2020. The town hall was then deemed surplus to requirements and South Norfolk District Council put up it for auction in 2024, with a guide price of £250,000 to £300,000.

== Architecture ==
The town hall is a three-storey building, five bays wide. It is built of brick and has a roof of black-glazed pantiles. There is a central doorway, with a wood panelled doorcase, and there is a semi-circular fanlight above the door. The other bays on the ground floor and all the bays on the first and second floors are fenestrated with sash windows. At roof level, there is a modillioned cornice. Inside, there is a staircase with stick balusters and a ramped handrail, while the council chamber has a Regency fire surround. It was grade II listed in 1950.
