= Charles Stanford (minister) =

Charles Stanford (1823–1886), was an English Baptist minister of the nineteenth century.

== Biography ==
Stanford, son of Joseph Stanford, shoemaker (d. 1862), was born at Green Lane, Northampton, on 9 March 1823. He was for some time a shoemaker, then a lawyer's clerk, and afterwards a bookseller's assistant. In 1839, at the age of sixteen, he commenced preaching, and in October 1841 entered the Bristol Baptist College. His first pastorate was at Sparrow Hill, Loughborough, where he stayed from 1845 to Christmas 1846. On 7 March 1847 he became minister of the United Presbyterian and Baptist Church at Devizes, Wiltshire, where his congregation gradually increased, and where he on 9 April 1852 opened a new chapel. In May 1858 he was elected co-pastor with Dr Edward Steane of Denmark Place Chapel, Camberwell, Surrey; and in May 1861, on the retirement of Steane, received the full charge. He remained at Camberwell till his death. In 1860 he visited Taunton, where, and in the neighbourhood, he collected information for his work J. Alleine, his Companions and his Times, published in 1861.

In 1878 Stanford received the degree of D.D. from Brown University, Rhode Island, US. He was the president of the London Baptist Association in 1882. From November 1881 he became almost blind from glaucoma, but prepared his work for the press with a typewriter.

He died at 26 De Crespigny Park, Denmark Hill, on 18 March 1886, and was buried at West Norwood Cemetery on 24 March. He was twice married.

== Publications ==
In addition to many sermons and devotional treatises, he published:

- Power in Weakness: Memorials of W. Rhodes of Damersham, 1858; 3rd edit. 1870.
- Charles Stanford (1861). Joseph Alleine: His Companions & Times, a Memorial of "Black Bartholomew", 1662. Jackson, Walford, and Hodder.
- Home and Church: a Chapter in Family Life at Old Maze Pond, 1871.
- Philip Doddridge, D.D., 1880 (Men Worth Knowing series).
- A Memorial of the Rev. E. Steane, 1882.
- The Wit and Humour of Life; being Familiar Talks with Young Christians, 1886.
