= River Tiffey =

River in Norfolk, England

Tiffey
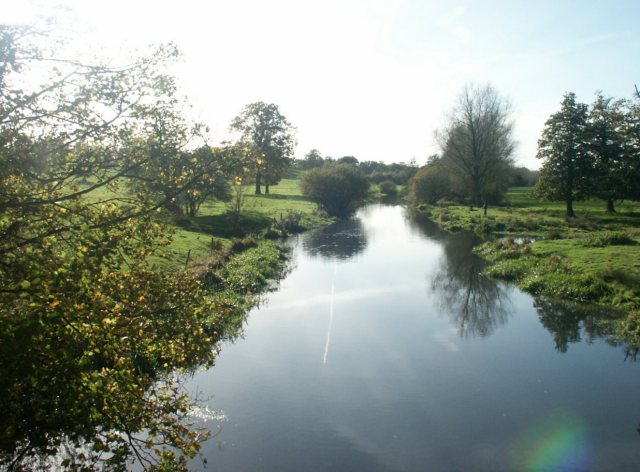
- River Tiffey at Carleton Forehoe

- Location of the river mouth within Norfolk

Location
- Country: England
- Region: Norfolk

Physical characteristics
- Source
  - location: Ashwellthorpe
  - coordinates: 52.5334°N 1.1409°E
  - elevation: 55 m (180 ft)
- Mouth: River Yare
  - location: Barford
  - coordinates: 52.6249°N 1.1361°E
  - elevation: 18 m (59 ft)
- Length: 17.1 km (10.6 mi)

Basin features
- River system: River Yare
- Tributaries
  - left: Bays River, Dyke Beck

The River Tiffey is a small river in Norfolk, England and a tributary of the River Yare. It rises near Hethel and passes through Wymondham before flowing generally north-eastwards passing through Kimberley, Carleton Forehoe, Wramplingham and Barford where the Tiffey joins the River Yare.
