= Edward Steane =

English Baptist minister (1798–1882)

The Reverend Edward Steane
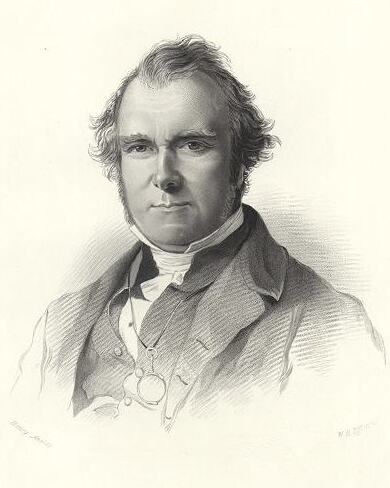
- Rev. Edward Steane in 1862
- Born: 23 March 1798; Oxford, England
- Died: 8 May 1882 (aged 84); Rickmansworth, England
- Known for: founding the Evangelical Alliance
- Parent: Samuel Steane

Edward Steane (23 March 1798–8 May 1882) was an English Baptist minister and one of the founders of the Evangelical Alliance.

== Life ==
Steane was born in 23 March 1798 in Oxford. His father dealt in wines and spirits and the family attended New Road Baptist Church. Steane went to school where he was taught by James Hinton and became a lifelong friend with his son, John Howard Hinton. Steane's interests were at the New Road church and although he briefly worked as a chemist the church agreed that he was to be a minister. He was sent for training at Bristol Baptist College and then unsuccessfully at Edinburgh University.

He returned to London where after a brief trial he started on his long career as minister at Denmark place in Camberwell.

In 1823 Steane was appointed to be the pastor of the Baptist church in Denmark Place in Camberwell. In 1826 he was on a committee that published a new Baptist hymnal called the New Selection. The book included one hymn by Steane called Prophetic era! blissful day! (The Triumphs of Christ anticipated). In 1834 he married Mary Stevenson, the granddaughter of Abraham Booth, another Baptist minister, and they had five children.

Steane is in the painting, which is of the 1840 Anti-Slavery Convention.

In 1840 Steane attended the 1840 World Anti-Slavery Convention and he was included in the commemorative painting.

Steane also helped found the Bible Translation Society charity after the British and Foreign Bible Society refused to fund a translation. The pivotal case was a translation of the Bible into Bengali. William Yates who had made the translation had chosen to translate the word "Baptise" as "Immerse" and this was in line with the Baptist beliefs and not necessarily every denomination. Steane served as its first secretary and later its treasurer. The formation of new bible translation societies proved divisive and expensive and they were eventually demerged.

In 1846 Steane was appointed as one of the people required to set up a conference that resulted in the Evangelical Alliance. He is seen as one of the founders and he edited the organisation's periodical, Evangelical Christendom.

Steane's failing health caused the church to appoint Rev Charles Stanford as a co-pastor at Camberwell in May 1858. Three years later Stanford took the job on full-time, but Steane was left with the title of Pastor until 1866. His first wife, Mary, died in 1862 and in 1864 he married Eliza Pigeon and gave up editing the Evangelical Christendom.

Steane died at his home near Rickmansworth on 8 May 1882.
