= Evangelical Alliance =

British Evangelical Christian organisation

- Founded: 19 August 1846
- Founders: Edward Steane, John Henderson of Park, Ridley Haim Herschell and Sir Culling Eardley, 3rd Baronet
- Type: Evangelical Christian union
- Registration no.: 212325 (England & Wales) SC040576 (Scotland)
- Purpose: Evangelical Christianity
- Headquarters: London, N1
- Location: England, Scotland, Wales, Northern Ireland
- Origins: London, United Kingdom
- Region served: United Kingdom
- Method: Provides advocacy, advice and information
- Members: 30,000 individuals, 3,300 churches, 700 organisations
- CEO: Gavin Calver
- Publication: idea (quarterly magazine)
- Affiliations: World Evangelical Alliance
- Employees: 50 (approximately)
- Website: www.eauk.org

The Evangelical Alliance (EA) is a national evangelical alliance in the United Kingdom, member of the World Evangelical Alliance. Founded in 1846, the Evangelical Alliance aims to promote evangelical Christian beliefs and advocate for evangelical Christians in politics and society. The Evangelical Alliance is based in London, with offices in Cardiff, Glasgow, Belfast and Stockport.

== History ==
The Evangelical Alliance was founded on 19 August 1846 by Ridley Haim Herschell, Edward Steane, John Henderson and Sir Culling Eardley. The organisation was founded during a meeting of approximately 800 evangelical leaders in London. The purpose of the newly established Evangelical Alliance was to promote unity among evangelicals.

Eardley became the organisation's first chairperson, leading the Alliance in its various campaigns for religious freedom; in 1852, Eardley campaigned on behalf of the Tuscan prisoners of conscience Francesco Madiai and Rosa Madiai, who had been imprisoned for their Protestant faith.

== Key people ==
As of 2020, the leadership of the Evangelical Alliance consisted of

- Gavin Calver, CEO (appointed on 1 October 2019)
- Peter Lynas, UK Director
- Jo Frost, Director of Communications and Engagement
- Fred Drummond, Director of Scotland
- Israel Oluwole Olofinjana, Director of the One People Commission
- John Gibson, Director of Finance and Operations
- Danny Webster, Director of Advocacy
- Hil Sewell, Director of People and Culture
- Emmie Burns, Personal Assistant to Gavin Calver

Past leaders of the Evangelical Alliance include Clive Calver (1983–1997), Joel Edwards (1997–2009) and Steve Clifford (2009–2019).

== Members ==
The Evangelical Alliance is a membership organisation whose members subscribe to its Basis of Faith and are expected to relate to one another in accordance with its Relational Commitments.

In its Annual Report 2024–2025, the Alliance listed 26,800 personal members as well as 500 organisations, 2,900 churches, and two corporations as corporational members. Member organisations include Tearfund, an organisation originally established by the Evangelical Alliance as the Evangelical Alliance Relief Fund, and CARE (Christian Action, Research and Education).

A number of UK Members of Parliament are associated with the Evangelical Alliance, including Labour MP Stephen Timms, a member of the Alliance's Council; Conservative MP and former Conservative Party leadership candidate Stephen Crabb, associated with the Alliance through Gweini (the Council of the Christian Voluntary Sector in Wales); and former Conservative MP for Congleton Fiona Bruce, a member of the Alliance.

Their membership has grown rapidly in within the past decade. In 2021, their membership was about 18,000. During 2024, their membership increased by 5,000 to reach 23,000. As of 2026, their membership is approximately 30,000. Their goal is to reach 50,000 members by 2033.

== Positions ==
=== Ecumenism ===
The Evangelical Alliance has historically supported ecumenism – the principle of unity between different church doctrines – with the Roman Catholic Church, an approach criticised by some as in direct contradiction to the beliefs of the Evangelical Alliance's founders. In 2019, the Alliance supported the 'Thy Kingdom Come' initiative – an event organised by the Archbishops of York and Canterbury to bring more people to Christianity through a sustained period of prayer from the dates of the Feast of the Ascension to Pentecost annually. In a 2024 report on the results of surveys it conducted in Northern Ireland, the Evangelical Alliance uncritically used the term "Catholic Evangelicals" to describe practising Roman Catholics who are committed to "evangelisation" and "renewal" but whose theological views do not necessarily align with the Alliance's basis of faith.

=== Homosexuality ===
According to a 2016 Private Eye report, the Evangelical Alliance is openly opposed to homosexuality and same-sex relationships, preaching sexual abstinence for those with same-sex attractions, with membership for openly lesbian and gay people open only to those who "come to see the need to be transformed" from their same-sex attraction. The Evangelical Alliance's website distinguishes between same-sex attraction and same-sex sexual relations, calling on people who want to live within God's purposes to renounce the latter. It states, "We encourage evangelical congregations to welcome and accept sexually active lesbians and gay men. However, they should do so in the expectation that they, like all of us who are living outside God's purposes, will come in due course to see the need to be transformed and live in accordance with biblical revelation and orthodox church teaching. We urge gentleness, patience and ongoing pastoral care during this process and after a person renounces same-sex sexual relations."

The Evangelical Alliance warned the Liz Truss government against a conversion therapy ban, warning that such a ban could end up criminalising church leaders and restrict religious freedom.

=== Abortion ===
The Evangelical Alliance calls "for world-leading support, services and legislation that seeks to protect the lives and health of both women and unborn children" through its Both Lives initiative, which was formerly known as Both Lives Matter. In a 2019 UK government consultation on proposed abortion legislation in Northern Ireland, the Evangelical Alliance responded 'Yes' to the question, "Do you agree that provision should be made for abortion without gestational time limit where: Termination is necessary to prevent grave permanent injury to the physical or mental health of the pregnant woman or girl?".
