= Abortion in the United Kingdom =

Abortion in the United Kingdom is regulated under the terms of the Abortion Act 1967 in Great Britain and the Abortion (Northern Ireland) (No.2) Regulations 2020 in Northern Ireland. Across the United Kingdom, abortion is permitted on the grounds of:

- risk to the life of the pregnant woman;
- preventing grave permanent injury to her physical or mental health;
- risk of injury to the physical or mental health of the pregnant woman or any existing children of her family (up to a term limit of 24 weeks of gestation); or
- substantial risk that, if the child were born, they would "suffer from such physical or mental abnormalities as to be seriously handicapped".

The third ground is typically interpreted liberally with regards to mental health to create a de facto elective abortion service; 98% of the approximately quarter-million abortions performed each year in Great Britain are done so for that reason. In Northern Ireland since 2020, abortion is also permitted within the first 12 weeks of a pregnancy for any reason.

Under the UK's devolution settlements, abortion policy is devolved to the Scottish Parliament (Note: As per the Scotland Act 2016.) and the Northern Ireland Assembly, but not to the Welsh Parliament (Senedd). Abortion was previously highly restricted in Northern Ireland although it was permitted in limited cases. In 2019, during a time when the Assembly was not operating, the UK Parliament repealed most restrictions on abortion in Northern Ireland; the current Regulations were subsequently introduced by Parliament in 2020.

Abortions which are carried out for grounds outside those permitted in law (e.g. in most cases after the 24-week term limit, or where appropriate consent has not been given) continue to be unlawful in each jurisdiction of the UK – under the Offences against the Person Act 1861 in England and Wales, Scottish common law and the Northern Ireland Regulations. The Infant Life (Preservation) Act 1929 and the Criminal Justice Act (Northern Ireland) 1945 also outlaw child destruction in cases outside the grounds permitted in abortion law. After several high-profile and controversial prosecutions of women in the 2020s, a current bill progressing through Parliament will also decriminalise a woman procuring her own abortion in England and Wales.

The most recent figures show that the number of legal abortions in England and Wales reached a record high of 277,970 in 2023. in April 2027, Early day motion 3220 was tabled in the House of Commons stating that “an estimated 11,105,671 lives have been lost to abortion in the United Kingdom since the Abortion Act 1967 came into effect 58 years ago”.

== Background ==
Debates and practices relating to abortion, pregnancy and the beginning of human life are recorded in Roman medical literature which would have been become available in Roman Britain from the 1st century AD onwards. The medical writer Soranus of Ephesus, for example, wrote in the early 2nd century:

A contraceptive differs from an abortive, for the first does not let conception take place, while the latter destroys what has been conceived [...] But a controversy has arisen. For one party banishes abortives, citing the testimony of Hippocrates who says: "I will give to no one an abortive"; moreover, because it is the specific task of medicine to guard and preserve what has been engendered by nature. The other party prescribes abortives, but with discrimination [...] only to prevent subsequent danger in parturition [childbirth].

Similar issues would also have been discussed in Celtic culture, although written Celtic texts were only available from around the 4th century. An early Christian understanding of preventing abortion and infanticide, as outlined in the 1st-century Didache and similar writings, would have been known in the early British Church which experienced more freedom and influence following Constantine's Edict of Milan in AD 313, and also in the early Irish Church after it was founded by Patrick around AD 432.

Alongside this cultural change in Roman society, a more significant sense of value was associated with the life (and death) of infant and neo-natal children. Several studies of the burials of children who died before or close to the time of birth in Roman Britain have been made, and the presence of neo-natal burials given the same burial rites as adults is "a pointer to identification of the cemetery as Christian" as such burials were rare before the 4th century.

Care for abandoned or unwanted children, such as kinship care within families and friendship circles, and the adoption and fostering of alumni, were also well-established in Roman society. In the early Middle Ages, in Britain and other regions of Northern Europe, parents who did not want to raise their children often gave them to monasteries along with a small fee – a practice known as oblation.

Abortion was mainly dealt with by the ecclesiastical courts until their abolition during the Reformation. These cases were generally assigned to the ecclesiastical courts due to problems of evidence; the courts had wider evidential rules and more discretion regarding sentencing. A number of cases such as the Twinslayers Case, in England in 1327, were heard in the secular courts as part of the common law. Later, under Scottish common law, abortion was defined as a criminal offence unless performed for "reputable medical reasons", a definition which could be interpreted as sufficiently broad as to essentially preclude prosecution.

== History from 1707 ==
William Blackstone wrote in his 1765 Commentaries on the Laws of England:

Life [...] begins in contemplation of law as soon as an infant is able to stir in the mother's womb. For if a woman is quick with child, and by a potion, or otherwise, killeth it in her womb; or if any one beat her, whereby the child dieth in her body, and she is delivered of a dead child; this, though not murder, was by the ancient law homicide or manslaughter. But at present it is not looked upon in quite so atrocious a light, though it remains a very heinous misdemeanor.

Shortly after his appointment as Lord Chief Justice of England and Wales, Edward Law, 1st Baron Ellenborough, codified abortion as an offence in statute law, in England and Wales and Ireland, through the Malicious Shooting or Stabbing Act 1803, which became known as Lord Ellenborough's Act. This legislation and the subsequent acts in the 19th century did not apply to Scotland due to its separate legal system based on common law.

The 1803 Act introduced capital punishment for wilfully, maliciously, and unlawfully administering "any deadly poison, or other noxious and destructive substance or thing, with intent [...] to cause and procure the miscarriage of any woman, then being quick with child" (section 1) and penalties, at the discretion of the court, up to and including penal transportation for using means to "cause the miscarriage of any woman not being, or not being proved to be, quick with child" (section 2).

The offences created by the 1803 Act were consolidated in the first Offences Against the Person Act, introduced by Robert Peel and enacted for England in 1828, which outlined the same offences and punishments (section 13). The same consolidation took place in Irish law through the Offences Against the Person (Ireland) 1829 (section 16). Both Acts were replaced by the Offences Against the Person Act 1837, which created a single abortion offence without a distinction around a pregnant woman being quick with child or not, and also repealed the death penalty for causing an abortion.

The law was again consolidated through the Offences against the Person Act 1861, which continues to be the main legislation for prosecuting personal injury in England, Wales and Northern Ireland. The Act created two offences – administering drugs or using instruments to procure abortion (section 58), which replaced the previous legislation from 1839 and allowed for a sentence of life imprisonment; and procuring drugs, or any other means, to cause abortion (section 59) with a potential sentence of three years' imprisonment. The content of the 1861 Act was applied in colonial legislation throughout the British Empire in subsequent years e.g. the Offences Against the Person Act 1866 in New Zealand.

Alongside legislation against abortion, philanthropy encouraged more formal and organised arrangements to care for children born from unwanted pregnancies through the initiatives of social reformers; examples included the orphanage movement (which included the Foundling Hospital, London, in 1739); the pioneering of foster care in Cheshire in 1853 by John Armistead; and the Adoption of Children Act 1926, for England and Wales.

In the late 19th century and early 20th centuries, abortifacents were discreetly advertised for women with unwanted pregnancies who were seeking abortions; there was also a considerable body of folklore about inducing miscarriages. So-called 'backstreet' abortionists using methods such as these were relatively common although their efforts could be fatal. Estimates of the number of illegal abortions varied widely; by one estimate, 100,000 women made efforts to procure an abortion in 1914, usually by drugs.

The criminality of abortion in England and Wales was reaffirmed in 1929, when the Infant Life (Preservation) Act was passed; the Act criminalised the deliberate destruction of a child "capable of being born alive". This was to close a lacuna in the law, identified by the former High Court judge Charles Darling, 1st Baron Darling, which allowed for infants to be killed during birth, thus meaning that the perpetrator could neither be prosecuted for abortion or murder. The Act included the presumption that all children in utero over 28 weeks of gestation were capable of being born alive. Where the life of child in utero was ended before this gestation, evidence was presented and considered to determine whether or not the child was capable of being born alive.

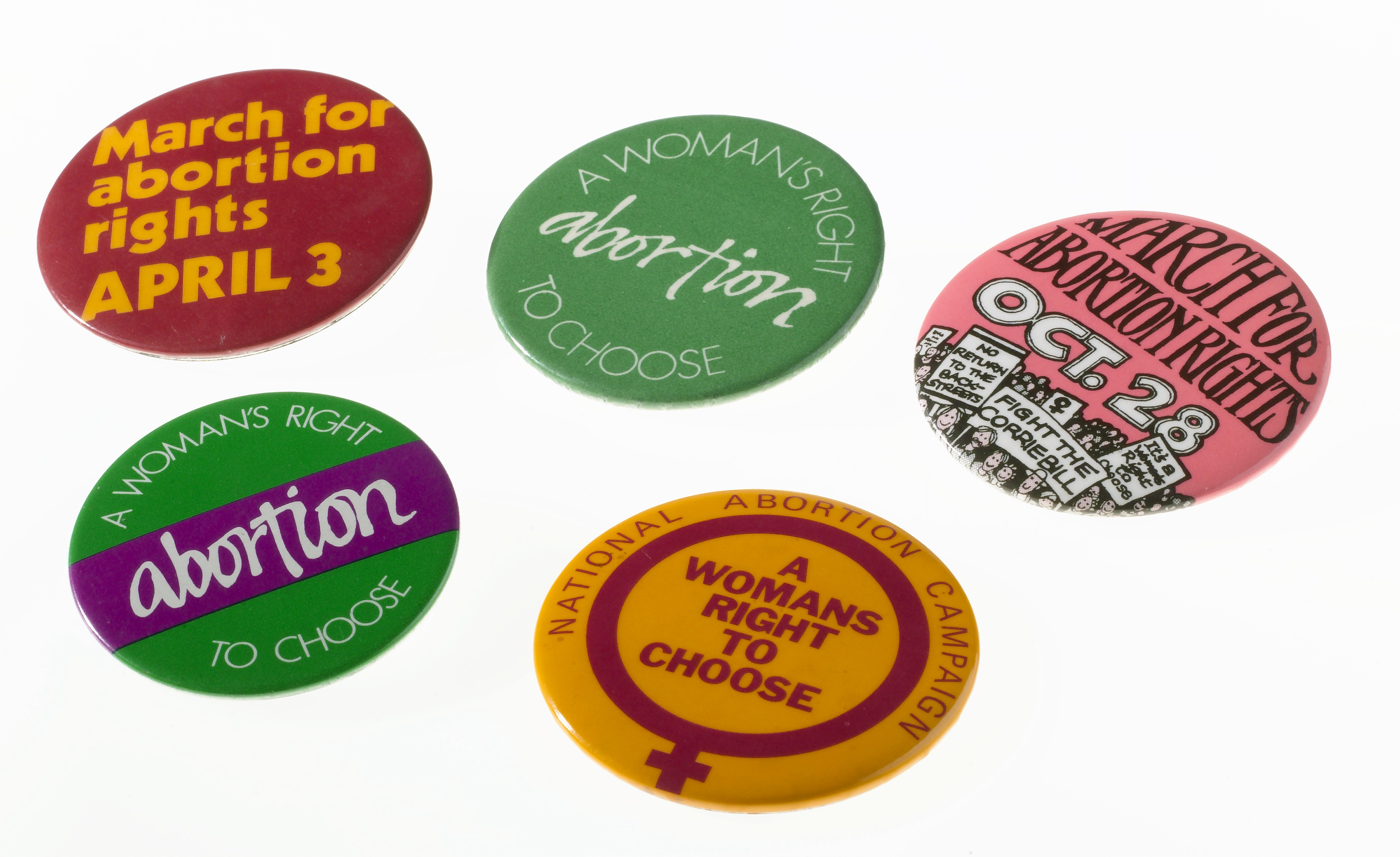
National Abortion Campaign badges protesting for a women's right to choose to have an abortion, 1970s

The Abortion Law Reform Association, an abortion rights lobbying group, was formed in 1936.

In 1938 the decision in R v. Bourne allowed for further considerations to be taken into account. This case related to an abortion performed on a girl who had been raped, and extended the defence to abortion to include "mental and physical wreck" (Lord Justice McNaghtan). The gynaecologist concerned, Aleck Bourne, later became a founder member of the anti-abortion group the Society for the Protection of Unborn Children (SPUC) in 1966.

In 1939 the Inter-Departmental Committee on Abortion, established by the Home Office and Ministry of Health, recommended a change to abortion laws but the intervention of World War II meant that all plans were shelved. Post-war, after decades of stasis, certain high-profile tragedies, including disability in unborn children caused by the thalidomide drug, and social changes brought the issue of abortion back into the political arena.

Westminster's responsibility for criminal justice and health policy, including around abortion, on the island of Ireland was transferred to the Northern Ireland Parliament (on its formation in 1921) and the Parliament of the Irish Free State (formed in December 1922). Both legislatures took an essentially conservative position, viewing abortion as an offence against the person, or an offence of child destruction, in line with existing legislation in England and Wales.

=== The 1967 Act ===
The Abortion Act 1967 sought to clarify the law in Britain. Introduced by David Steel and subject to heated debate, it allowed for legal abortion on a number of grounds, with the added protection of free provision through the National Health Service. The Act was passed on 27 October 1967 and came into effect on 27 April 1968.

Before the Human Fertilisation and Embryology Act 1990 amended the Act, the Infant Life (Preservation) Act 1929 acted as a buffer to the Abortion Act 1967. This meant that abortions could not be carried out if the child was "capable of being born alive". There was therefore no statutory limit put into the Abortion Act 1967, the limit being that which the courts decided as the time at which a child could be born alive. The C v S case in 1987 confirmed that, at that time, between 19 and 22 weeks a foetus was not capable of being born alive. The 1967 Act required that the procedure must be certified by two doctors before being performed.

=== Proposals since 1967: Great Britain ===
During each Parliament, several private member's bills are generally introduced to seek to amend the law in relation to abortion. In the years following a supportive report in favour of the 1967 Act by the Lane Committee in 1974, Members of Parliament introduced four bills which have resulted in substantive debate in the House of Commons (votes are indicated in brackets with ayes followed by noes):

- Abortion (Amendment) Bill 1975 – referred to a select committee (260–125);
- Abortion (Amendment) Bill 1976 – referred to select committee (313–172);
- Abortion (Amendment) Bill 1979 – approved at second stage (242–98) but not enacted;
- Abortion (Amendment) Bill 1988 – approved at second stage (296–251) but not enacted;

Percentage of births to unmarried women, selected countries, 1980 and 2007

In addition, in 1990, members voted on several proposed amendments to clause 34 of the Human Fertilisation and Embryology Bill relating to the termination of pregnancy.

The Human Fertilisation and Embryology Act 1990, as enacted, lowered the term limit from 28 to 24 weeks for abortion in cases of 'mental or physical injury' on the ground that medical technology had advanced sufficiently (since 1967) to justify the change but removed restrictions for late abortions in cases of risk to life, grave physical and mental injury to the woman, and the disability in the unborn child (by separating the legal effect of the Infant Life (Preservation) Act 1929 from the Abortion Act 1967).

When a further Human Fertilisation and Embryology Bill (now enacted) was considered by Parliament in 2008, several votes were held on the term limit in Britain, as follows:

- Reduction from 24 weeks to 12 weeks (71 ayes, 393 noes);
- Reduction from 24 weeks to 16 weeks (84 ayes, 386 noes);
- Reduction from 24 weeks to 20 weeks (190 ayes, 331 noes); and
- Reduction from 24 weeks to 22 weeks (233 ayes, 304 noes).

Abortion rights groups strongly opposed any attempts to restrict abortion in the 2008 parliamentary debates and votes. A number of abortion rights amendments were proposed by the Labour Party MPs Diane Abbott, Katy Clark and John McDonnell, including NC30 Amendment of the Abortion Act 1967: Application to Northern Ireland. However, it was reported that the Labour government at the time asked MPs not to table these amendments (at least until third reading) and then used parliamentary mechanisms in order to prevent a vote; the government was, at the time, seeking to devolve policing and justice powers to the Northern Ireland Assembly (which had previously voted to oppose the extension of the 1967 Act).

In 2017 the Reproductive Health (Access to Terminations) Bill was introduced by the Labour MP Diana Johnson with the aim of repealing criminal law on abortion in England and Wales. However, with the call for a general election, the bill fell and no further action was taken.

Amendments to the Abortion Act 1967 have been introduced as conscience vote issues attached to government legislation, the most recent being the legalisation of usage of abortion medication at home in the first ten weeks of pregnancy in the Health and Care Act 2022.

In June 2025, MPs voted 379-137 on a free vote to disapply the criminal law related to abortion from women acting in relation to their own pregnancy as part of report stage of the Crime and Policing Bill. Led by Tonia Antoniazzi MP, the disapplication was brought forward following reports of women in England and Wales being investigated on suspicion of ending their own pregnancy contrary to the Offences Against the Person Act 1861 or Infant Life (Preservation) Act 1929.

The Crime and Policing Act 2026 received royal assent on 29 April 2026. Part 16 of it decriminalises abortion in England and Wales by disapplying sections of the Offences Against the Person Act 1861 and Infant Life (Preservation) Act 1929 when applied to one's own pregnancy. Due to this, any woman, living or dead, who was convicted of or cautioned for, “an offence under the law related to abortion, including sections 58 and 59 of the Offences against the Person Act 1861, and the Infant Life (Preservation) Act 1929” was automatically pardoned in 2026. Also, that year any woman investigated or arrested for ending her own pregnancy had any such details removed from her criminal record.

=== Proposals since 1967: Northern Ireland ===
Health, social care and criminal justice policy was devolved to the Northern Ireland Parliament at the time of the Abortion Act 1967's passage at Westminster and the Parliament did not introduce abortion legislation before its suspension in 1972. Statute law was maintained unchanged under Conservative and Labour direct rule administrations and the first Northern Ireland Assembly in 1973-1974 although the law was interpreted through case law in local courts (during the 1990s) to also allow for the grounds of "a risk of real and serious adverse effect on [...] [the] physical or mental health [of the woman] is either long term or permanent". From 1983 onwards, the Constitution of Ireland, covering the Republic with a territorial claim on Northern Ireland until 1998, acknowledged "the right to life of the unborn and, with due regard to the equal right to life of the mother" and "guaranteed in its laws to respect, and, as far as practicable, by its laws to defend and vindicate that right."

The new Northern Ireland Assembly, formed in 1998 following the Good Friday Agreement, voted in June 2000 to oppose the extension of the Abortion Act 1967 to Northern Ireland; the motion was proposed by the Democratic Unionist Party (DUP) and supported by the Social Democratic and Labour Party (SDLP) which was, at the time, opposed to abortion but also emphasised an understanding of the social, economic and personal circumstances that gave rise to women choosing the option of an abortion. While health policy had been devolved again to Northern Ireland in December 1999, on the formation of the first Northern Ireland Executive, criminal law (including in relation to abortion) continued to be reserved to Parliament at Westminster until the devolution of policing and justice powers in May 2010.

Political debate around abortion issues was renewed following the opening of a private abortion clinic in Belfast in 2012, the Protection of Life During Pregnancy Act 2013 in the Republic, and the widespread discussion of a case of fatal foetal abnormality; several debates took place in the Northern Ireland Assembly and its members, in line with party policy and/or personal conscience, decided not to proceed with changes in the law. An amendment by DUP MLA Jim Wells to "restrict lawful abortions to NHS premises, except in cases of urgency when access to NHS premises is not possible and where no fee is paid" was unsuccessful. Later, as Health Minister, Jim Wells opposed abortion in cases of rape as the unborn child would be "punished for what has happened by having their life terminated" although he acknowledged that this would be "a tragic and difficult situation".

Justice Minister David Ford (a member of the Alliance Party) issued a public consultation on amending the criminal law on abortion, which opened in October 2014 and closed in January 2015. However, Ford also wrote that "it is not a debate on the wider issues of abortion law – issues often labelled as 'pro-choice' and 'pro-life'". The Sinn Féin Deputy First Minister, Martin McGuinness, had initially stated his party's opposition to abortion and noted that the party had "resisted any attempt to bring the British 1967 Abortion Act to the North." At its 2015 annual conference, Sinn Féin adopted a policy of allowing abortion under certain circumstances such as fatal foetal abnormality; this was superseded by a newer and more liberal policy adopted at its 2018 conference.

In February 2016, during debates on the Justice (No.2) Bill, the Assembly considered and debated an amendment to allow for abortion in cases of pregnancies caused by sexual crime (which was rejected by 64 notes to 32 ayes), and an amendment to allow for abortion in cases of fatal foetal abnormality (which was rejected by 59 noes to 40 ayes). Sinn Féin and the Green Party voted in favour of both proposals, whereas the DUP and the SDLP supported the existing law, and members of the Ulster Unionist Party (UUP) and Alliance Party voted on conscience. The Abortion (Fatal Foetal Abnormality) Bill was introduced by David Ford, as a backbench MLA, in December 2016 but fell on the suspension of the Assembly in January 2017.

In the 2017 general election the Labour Party manifesto under the leadership of Jeremy Corbyn stated: "Labour will continue to ensure a woman's right to choose a safe, legal abortion – and we will work with the Assembly to extend that right to women in Northern Ireland." The election resulted in a confidence and supply agreement between the Conservative Party and the DUP. The Conservative government, in June 2017, made a commitment to provide free abortion services in England for women from Northern Ireland due to pressure from Conservative MPs. The Labour Party commitment was, in effect, delivered through private member's amendments enacted in the Northern Ireland Executive (Formation) Act 2019, which repealed the Offences against the Person Act 1861 (sections 58 and 59) in October 2019. The political context was also changed by legal challenges, the repeal of the Eighth Amendment in the Republic in 2018 (supported by Sinn Féin), and the SDLP's decision to consider abortion as a matter of conscience.

Shortly after the introduction of the Abortion (Northern Ireland) Regulations 2020, the newly restored Northern Ireland Assembly voted – with 46 members in favour and 40 against – to reject "the imposition of abortion legislation that extends to all non-fatal disabilities, including Down's syndrome." Following this vote, the Severe Fetal Impairment Abortion (Amendment) Bill – to remove the grounds for abortion for non-fatal disabilities – was introduced by DUP MLA Paul Givan in February 2021. It reached its consideration stage in December 2021 but MLAs decided – by 45 votes to 43 – against the main proposal in the Bill at that stage.

== Great Britain ==
The main legislation on abortion in both England and Wales, and Scotland is the Abortion Act 1967, as amended by the Human Fertilisation and Embryology Act 1990. This generally allows abortion for socio-economic reasons during the first 24 weeks of the pregnancy (a later term limit than most other countries in Europe), and after this point for medical reasons.

=== England and Wales ===
The Offences Against the Person Act 1861, in England and Wales, prohibits administering drugs or using instruments to procure an abortion and procuring drugs or other items to cause an abortion although subsequent law has provided for a range of grounds which allow abortion to be widely available.

The Infant Life (Preservation) Act 1929 amended the law in England and Wales to create the offence of child destruction – in cases where any person "who, with intent to destroy the life of a child capable of being born alive, by any wilful act causes a child to die before it has an existence independent of its mother". For the purposes of this Act, a child whose mother has been pregnant for 28 weeks is deemed "capable of being born alive". The 1929 Act also provides a defence where it is proved that causing the death of the child was "done in good faith for the purpose only of preserving the life of the mother."

The Abortion Act 1967 originally permitted abortion "by a registered medical practitioner if two registered medical practitioners are of the opinion, formed in good faith" on the following grounds:

- a risk to the life of the pregnant woman, or of injury to the physical or mental health of the pregnant woman or any existing children of her family; or
- a substantial risk that if the child were born it would suffer from such physical or mental abnormalities as to be "seriously handicapped".

The Act came into operation in 1968, and originally applied a term limit of 28 weeks, in line with the Infant Life Preservation Act. It was subsequently amended by the Human Fertilisation and Embryology Act 1990, to allow for the following grounds:

- Ground A – risk to the life of the pregnant woman;
- Ground B – to prevent grave permanent injury to the physical or mental health of the pregnant woman;
- Ground C – risk of injury to the physical or mental health of the pregnant woman (up to 24 weeks in the pregnancy);
- Ground D – risk of injury to the physical or mental health of any existing children of the family of the pregnant woman (up to 24 weeks in the pregnancy);
- Ground E – substantial risk that if the child were born it would suffer from such physical or mental abnormalities as to be seriously handicapped;
- Ground F – to save the life of the pregnant woman; or
- Ground G – to prevent grave permanent injury to the physical or mental health of the pregnant woman in an emergency.

The amendment therefore allowed for a reduction in the term limit to 24 weeks for Ground C and Ground D with the law changing to reflect advances in technology to enable premature children to be born alive earlier in a pregnancy. However, no term limit was applied to other grounds and abortion was permitted throughout the pregnancy in these cases. The changes took effect in April 1991.

Abortion law was not devolved to the Senedd under Government of Wales Act 1998 and was specifically reserved to the UK Parliament via the Government of Wales Act 2006.

In April 2024 a cross-party group of MPs put forward amendments to the current abortion law in England and Wales to decriminalise abortion up to 24 weeks and ensure that future legislation and guidance protects the right to an abortion. An amendment proposed that abortion be entirely decriminalised for women, whereby the 24-week limit and the requirement for approval by two doctors would remain but if the time limit is not kept to the woman would not be prosecuted, though criminal sanctions would still apply to doctors and midwives involved in abortion beyond 24-weeks. A different amendment proposed decriminalising abortion up to 24-weeks by making it an automatic right for women and allowing it to be carried out and authorised by an approved clinician if a woman requests it. In June 2025, the UK Parliament voted to end prosecution for women who self-manage abortions. The amendment, led by the Labour MP Tonia Antoniazzi, removed criminal penalties under the Offences Against the Person Act 1861, ensuring women would no longer face legal action.

=== Scotland ===
Abortion became an offence in Scotland with the passing of the Abortion Act 1967 and refers to "any rule of law relating to the procurement of abortion". Prior to 1967, there was no offence of abortion in Scotland; however, if harm occurred consequent to an abortion, various offences could have applied with abortion forming part of the description of the elements forming the offence on the petition or indictment presented to a court.

The Scotland Act 1998, which established the Scottish Parliament, reserved abortion law to the UK Parliament but it was subsequently devolved through the Scotland Act 2016. The Abortion Act 1967 remains in place.

=== Interpretation ===
Section 58 of the Offences against the Person Act 1861 reads as follows and prohibits administering drugs or using instruments to cause a miscarriage:

Every woman, being with child, who, with intent to procure her own miscarriage, shall unlawfully administer to herself any poison or other noxious thing, or shall unlawfully use any instrument or other means whatsoever with the like intent, and whosoever, with intent to procure the miscarriage of any woman whether she be or be not with child, shall unlawfully administer to her or cause to be taken by her any poison or other noxious thing, or unlawfully use any instrument or other means whatsoever with the like intent, shall be guilty of felony, and being convicted thereof shall be liable [...] to be kept in penal servitude for life [...]

Section 59 of that Act reads as follows and prohibits the procurement of drugs or other items to cause a miscarriage:

Whosoever shall unlawfully supply or procure any poison or other noxious thing, or any instrument or thing whatsoever, knowing that the same is intended to be unlawfully used or employed with intent to procure the miscarriage of any woman, whether she be or be not with child, shall be guilty of a misdemeanor, and being convicted thereof shall be liable [...] to be kept in penal servitude [...]

The following terms in the 1861 Act may be interpreted as follows:

- Unlawfully – for the purposes of sections 58 and 59 of the Offences against the Person Act 1861, and any rule of law relating to the procurement of abortion, anything done with intent to procure a woman's miscarriage (or in the case of a woman carrying more than one foetus, her miscarriage of any foetus) is unlawfully done unless authorised by section 1 of the Abortion Act 1967 and, in the case of a woman carrying more than one foetus, anything done with intent to procure her miscarriage of any foetus is authorised by the said section 1 if the ground for termination of the pregnancy specified in subsection (1)(d) of the said section 1 applies in relation to any foetus and the thing is done for the purpose of procuring the miscarriage of that foetus, or any of the other ground for termination of the pregnancy specified in the said section 1 applies;
- Felony and misdemeanour – see the Criminal Law Act 1967;
- Mode of trial – the offences under section 58 and 59 are indictable-only offences;
- Sentence – an offence under section 58 is punishable with imprisonment for life or for any shorter term and an offence under section 59 is punishable with imprisonment for a term not exceeding five years.

A death of a person in being which is caused by an unlawful attempt to procure an abortion, is at least manslaughter.

The following terms in the 1967 Act may be interpreted as follows:

- The law relating to abortion – in England and Wales, this means sections 58 and 59 of the Offences against the Person Act 1861 and any rule of law relating to the procurement of abortion. and in Scotland, this means any rule of law relating to the procurement of abortion;
- Terminated by a registered medical practitioner includes a procedure supervised by a medical practitioner – see Royal College of Nursing of the UK v DHSS [1981] AC 800, [1981] 2 WLR 279, [1981] 1 All ER 545, [1981] Crim LR 322, HL;
- Place where termination must be carried out – see sections 1(3) to (4);
- The opinion of two registered medical practitioners – see section 1(4);
- Good faith – see R v Smith (John Anthony James), 58 Cr App R 106, CA;
- Determining the risk of injury in ss. (a) & (b) – see section 1(2);
- Risk, greater than if the pregnancy were terminated, of injury to the physical or mental health of the pregnant woman – In R v British Broadcasting Corporation, ex parte ProLife Alliance, Lord Justice Laws said: "There is some evidence that many doctors maintain that the continuance of a pregnancy is always more dangerous to the physical welfare of a woman than having an abortion, a state of affairs which is said to allow a situation of de facto abortion on demand to prevail."

== Northern Ireland ==
=== Statute law before 2019 ===
Before significant changes in 2019, there were two main laws on abortion in Northern Ireland:

- the Offences Against the Person Act 1861 (sections 58 and 59) prohibited attempts to cause a miscarriage;
- the Criminal Justice Act (Northern Ireland) 1945 (sections 25 and 26) provided an exception for acting "in good faith for the purpose only of preserving the life of the mother" and also created the offence of child destruction i.e. to cause a child to die "before it has an existence independent of its mother".

=== Case law before 2019 ===
Between 1993 and 1999 a series of court cases had interpreted the law as also allowing for abortion in cases where, for the pregnant woman, "there is a risk of real and serious adverse effect on her physical or mental health, which is either long term or permanent".

In Northern Ireland Health and Social Services Board v A and Others [1994] NIJB 1, Lord Justice MacDermott said that he was "satisfied that the statutory phrase, 'for the purpose only of preserving the life of the mother' does not relate only to some life-threatening situation. Life in this context means that physical or mental health or well-being of the mother and the doctor's act is lawful where the continuance of the pregnancy would adversely affect the mental or physical health of the mother. The adverse effect must however be a real and serious one and there will always be a question of fact and degree whether the perceived effect of non-termination is sufficiently grave to warrant terminating the unborn child."

In Western Health and Social Services Board v CMB and the Official Solicitor (1995, unreported), Mr Justice Pringle stated that "the adverse effect must be permanent or long-term and cannot be short term ... in most cases the adverse effect would need to be a probable risk of non-termination but a possible risk might be sufficient if the imminent death of the mother was a risk in question".

In Family Planning Association of Northern Ireland v Minister for Health, Social Services and Public Safety (October 2004), Lord Justice Nicholson stated that "it is unlawful to procure a miscarriage where the foetus is abnormal but viable, unless there is a risk that the mother may die or is likely to suffer long-term harm, which is serious, to her physical or mental health". In the same case, Lord Justice Sheil stated that "termination of a pregnancy based solely on abnormality of the foetus is unlawful and cannot lawfully be carried out in this jurisdiction".

In November 2015, Lord Justice Horner made a declaration of incompatibility under the Human Rights Act 1998 to the effect that Northern Ireland's law on abortion (specifically its lack of provision in cases of fatal foetal abnormality or where the pregnancy is the result of rape or incest) could not be interpreted in a manner consistent with Article 8 of the European Convention on Human Rights i.e. a right to respect for his private and family life, his home and his correspondence; the convention also protects a right to life in Article 2. In June 2017, the declaration of incompatibility was quashed by the Court of Appeal on the grounds that "a broad margin of appreciation must be accorded to the state" and "a fair balance has been struck by the law as it presently stands until the legislature decides otherwise". In June 2018, the Supreme Court of the United Kingdom held that the law of Northern Ireland was incompatible with the right to respect for private and family life, insofar as the law prohibited abortion in cases of rape, incest and fatal foetal abnormality. However, the court did not restore the declaration of incompatibility as it also held that the claimant did not have standing to bring the proceedings and accordingly the court had no jurisdiction to make a declaration of incompatibility reflect its view on the compatibility issues. The judgments of the Supreme Court acknowledged that the court lacked jurisdiction to issue a declaration of incompatibility but included a non-binding opinion that an incompatibility existed, and that a future case in which the applicant had the necessary standing would be likely to succeed. It also urged the authorities "responsible for ensuring the compatibility of Northern Ireland law with the Convention rights" to "recognise and take account of these conclusions ... by considering whether and how to amend the law".

=== Changes in law: 2019–2020 ===
The law on abortion in Northern Ireland was changed by Parliament during a suspension of the Northern Ireland Executive, which took place between 2017 and 2020. Recommendations to liberalise abortion law in Northern Ireland were published in February 2018 by the United Nations Committee on the Elimination of Discrimination against Women (CEDAW) in the report of its Inquiry concerning the United Kingdom (under Article 8 of the Optional Protocol to the Convention on the Elimination of All Forms of Discrimination against Women).

The Northern Ireland (Executive Formation etc) Act 2019, enacted on 24 July 2019, extended the deadline for the restoration of the Executive to 21 October 2019. Under a private member's amendment introduced by Stella Creasy MP, if an Executive were not restored by that date, the Act would:

- require the Secretary of State for Northern Ireland to implement recommendations regarding abortion made in the CEDAW report;
- repeal sections 58 and 59 of the Offences Against the Person Act 1861 under the law of Northern Ireland; and
- require the Secretary of State, by regulation, to make further changes in the law for complying with the recommendations with those regulations coming into force on 31 March 2020.

On 21 October 2019, as a result of the Executive not being restored, sections 58 and 59 of the 1861 Act were repealed. Legal protection for the life of a child who was "capable of being born alive" continued under the Criminal Justice Act (Northern Ireland) 1945.

The Executive was restored in January 2020, but since this was past the deadline of 21 October 2019, legislation on abortion continued to be implemented through Westminster. The Abortion (Northern Ireland) Regulations 2020 were laid before Parliament on 25 March 2020 and took effect on 31 March 2020. The Regulations allowed for abortion in Northern Ireland in the following circumstances:

- where the pregnancy has not exceeded its twelfth week;
- a risk of injury to the physical or mental health of the pregnant woman (up to a term limit of 24 weeks);
- a risk to life or risk of grave permanent injury to physical or mental health of the pregnant woman;
- a severe fetal impairment – "a substantial risk that if the child were born, it would suffer from such physical or mental impairment as to be seriously disabled" (with no term limit); or
- a fatal fetal abnormality – "a substantial risk that the death of the fetus is likely before, during or shortly after birth" (with no term limit).

A person who intentionally terminates or procures the termination of a pregnancy other than in accordance with the Regulations commits an offence; this does not apply to a pregnant woman or where the act which caused the termination was done in good faith for the purpose only of saving the woman's life or preventing grave permanent injury. The 1945 Act remains in law, including the offence of child destruction, although this no longer applies to a pregnant woman, or a registered medical professional acting in accordance with the Regulations.

The Regulations were replaced by the Abortion (Northern Ireland) (No. 2) Regulations 2020, which were materially the same with minor corrections and came into force on 14 May 2020. In May 2022, just over two years after the change in the law, it was reported that abortion clinics and treatments available in Northern Ireland were limited and women seeking to have abortions continued to travel to Great Britain (mainly England). By 2024, abortion services were now available in all five hospital trusts in Northern Ireland, enabling the majority of demand to be met locally.

== Political party approaches ==
Abortion, as with other sensitive issues, is regarded as a matter of conscience within the main political parties in Great Britain. Conservative, Labour, Liberal Democrat and Scottish National Party representatives, for example, considered and individually decided to vote for or against several proposed changes in the term limit in 2008.

While active the Women's Equality Party supported removing abortion from criminal law and supported safe access to abortions.

Minor British political parties which oppose abortion include the Heritage Party, Britain First and the Scottish Family Party.

In Northern Ireland, for the Social Democratic and Labour Party (SDLP), the Ulster Unionist Party (UUP), and the Alliance Party, abortion is also a matter of conscience, in line with the approach at Westminster. The SDLP previously advocated an anti-abortion formal party position, including opposition to the extension of the Abortion Act 1967 to Northern Ireland; this was changed by the party's membership to a conscience approach in May 2018.

The Democratic Unionist Party (DUP) and Traditional Unionist Voice (TUV) supported the pre-2019 law on abortion and opposed the legislative changes introduced in 2020 through the Northern Ireland (Executive Formation) Act. DUP MLA Paul Givan introduced the Severe Fetal Impairment Abortion (Amendment) Bill in February 2021, which sought to remove the ground for an abortion in cases of a severe disability in the unborn child (e.g. Down's Syndrome), which was supported by several representatives from other political parties on grounds of conscience. The TUV reaffirmed it's opposition to abortion in its 2024 UK general election manifesto.

Sinn Féin policy, as approved by its annual conference in June 2018, is for abortion to be available "where a woman's life, [physical] health or mental health is at risk and in cases of fatal foetal abnormality" and "without specific indication ... through a GP led service in a clinical context as determined by law and licensing practice for a limited gestational period". The party previously held a more conservative position, for example in 2007 opposing the extension of the 1967 Act and preferring an approach to crisis pregnancy which involved comprehensive sex education, full access to affordable childcare, and comprehensive support services including include financial support for single parents.

Following the policy decisions in 2018 by Sinn Féin and the SDLP, a new political party - Aontú - was formed with a policy of opposing abortion and upholding "the right to life of everyone irrespective of age, gender, race, creed, abilities or stage of development." Aontú has advocated for a "humane and compassionate response" to unwanted pregnancies, including economic support to take mothers out of poverty, pain relief being provided for the unborn child after 20 weeks of gestation, medical care for children who are born after an abortion procedure, and a legislative ban on abortion in cases of disability and gender selection.

The Green Party in Northern Ireland and People Before Profit support the full decriminalisation of abortion (i.e. that it should be made available for any reason).

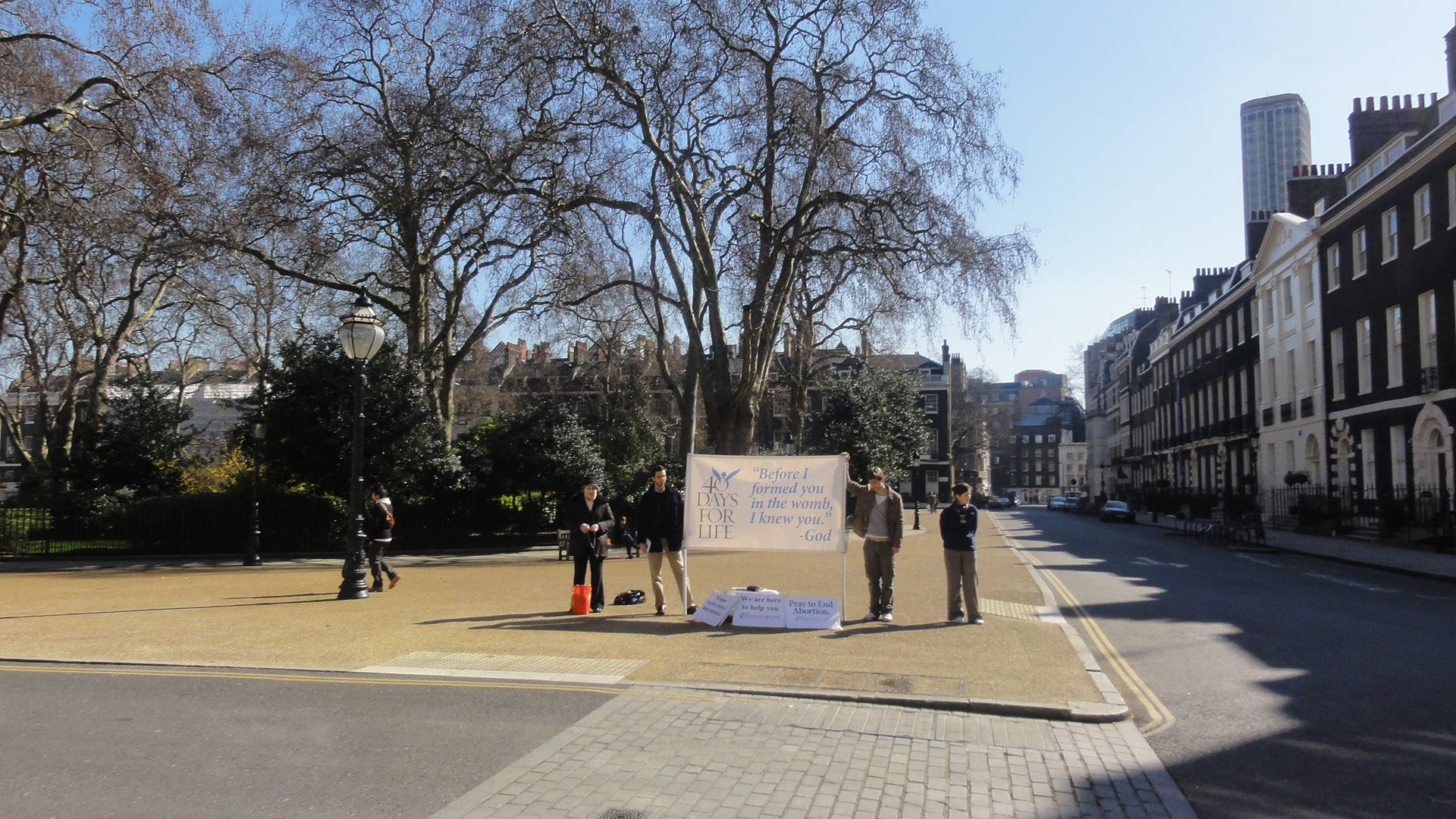
Anti-abortion protesters in London, 2011

== Faith perspectives ==
As in other countries, there is a wide range of personal individual views on abortion within church denominations.

=== Roman Catholic ===
The Catechism of the Catholic Church states that human life "must be respected and protected absolutely from the moment of conception" and that from the first moment of existence, "a human being must be recognized as having the rights of a person – among which is the inviolable right of every innocent being to life." The Church has affirmed "the moral evil of every procured abortion" since the 1st century AD and describes direct abortion "willed either as an end or a means" as gravely contrary to the moral law. Pope John Paul II reaffirmed the Catechism in his papal encyclical Evangelium vitae (The Gospel of Life) in 1995, which taught on "bringing about a transformation of culture" in relation to abortion and the value of human life, including extensive care and support for pregnant women, their children and their families.

During his pastoral visit to Great Britain in 1982, John Paul II remarked: "I support with all my heart those who recognize and defend the law of God which governs human life. We must never forget that every person, from the moment of conception to the last breath, is a unique child of God and has a right to life. This right should be defended by the attentive care of the medical and nursing professions and by the protection of the law." Pope Benedict XVI, on his state visit to the United Kingdom in 2010, stated: "Life is a unique gift, at every stage from conception until natural death, and it is God's alone to give and to take."

=== Anglican ===
The Church of England combines strong opposition to abortion with a recognition that there can be "strictly limited" conditions under which it may be morally preferable to any available alternative. This is based on its view that the foetus is a human life with the potential to develop relationships, think, pray, choose and love. The Church has suggested that the case for further reductions of the time limit for abortions should be "sympathetically considered on the basis of advances in neo-natal care" and has stated that every possible support, especially by church members, needs to be given to those who are pregnant in difficult circumstances.

Writing on the 40th anniversary of the 1967 Act, in 2007, the then Archbishop of Canterbury Rowan Williams commented that most parliamentarians who voted for the Act "did so in the clear belief that they were making provision for extreme and tragic situations" but that its implementation since then demonstrated unintended consequences. The strengthening of the language of 'foetal rights' (i.e. that "the pregnant woman who smokes or drinks heavily is widely regarded as guilty of infringing the rights of her unborn child") could be contrasted with "the liberty of the pregnant woman herself to perform the actions that will terminate a pregnancy."

The Church of Ireland – a province of the Anglican Communion alongside the Church of England – affirms that "every human being is created with intrinsic dignity in the image of God with the right to life." It has opposed the "extreme abortion legislation" imposed on Northern Ireland, asked that legislation is developed that safeguards the well-being of both the mother and unborn child, and encouraged its members to provide more support to mothers during pregnancy, particularly during times of crisis. In relation to potential grounds for abortion, the Church recognises that there are "exceptional circumstances of strict and undeniable medical necessity where an abortion should be an option (or more rarely a necessity)."

=== Presbyterian ===
The General Assembly of the (Presbyterian) Church of Scotland regards the foetus as "from the beginning, an independent human being" and therefore it can be threatened "only in the case of threat to maternal life, and that after the exhaustion of all alternatives".

The Presbyterian Church in Ireland, the largest Protestant denomination in Northern Ireland, is strongly anti-abortion, and maintains that abortion should only be permitted in exceptional circumstances (e.g. where there is a real and substantial risk to the life of the mother) subject to the most stringent safeguards. The Church has affirmed the sanctity of human life, that human life begins at conception, and that complex medical and social issues such as abortion need to be handled with sensitivity and compassion.

=== Methodist ===
The Conference of the Methodist Church of Great Britain stated in 1976 that the human foetus had "an inviolable right to life" and that abortion should never be seen as an alternative to contraception. The Church also recognised that foetus is "totally dependent" on his or her mother for at least the first twenty weeks of its life and said that the mother has "a total right to decide whether or not to continue the pregnancy." The Church has supported counselling opportunities for mothers so that they fully understand the decision, and the alternatives to abortion.

Its sister church, the Methodist Church in Ireland, is opposed to what it describes as "abortion on demand" and urges support and resources for those who have an unplanned pregnancy. The Church recognises that there are complex situations "in which early termination of pregnancy should be available" and considers that these include "when a mother's life is at risk, when a pregnancy is the result of a sexual crime, or in cases of fatal foetal abnormality."

=== Others ===
The smaller Protestant churches are generally conservative on the issue of abortion.

Congregations and members of major non-Christian religions in the UK likewise provide pastoral support for women, families and children whose circumstances are affected by crisis pregnancies and abortion, in a range of ways. Views on the morality and potential grounds for abortion vary within Islam, Hinduism and Buddhism, and Judaism.

== Campaign groups ==
Prominent campaign groups which are supportive of a conservative policy include Both Lives Matter, Christian Action Research and Education (CARE), Evangelical Alliance, Life, Society for the Protection of Unborn Children (SPUC) and the UK Life League. Campaigning organisations in support of a liberal policy include Amnesty International, the British Pregnancy Advisory Service (BPAS), the Family Planning Association (FPA), Marie Stopes, MSI Reproductive Choices, and Humanists UK.

Abortion policy in Northern Ireland was the subject of intense discussion and campaigning in the decade leading up to changes in the law in 2019 and 2020. The issue is debated less frequently in Great Britain, where the law was last substantially changed in 1990.

== Crown dependencies ==
Although Jersey, Guernsey, and the Isle of Man are not part of the United Kingdom, as they are part of the Common Travel Area, people resident on these islands who choose to have an abortion have travelled to the UK since the Abortion Act 1967.

=== Jersey ===
It is lawful in Jersey to have an abortion in the first 12 weeks of pregnancy if the woman is in "distress" and requests it; in the first 24 weeks in case of foetal abnormalities; and at any time to save the woman's life or prevent serious permanent injury to her health. The criteria were established in the Termination of Pregnancy (Jersey) Law 1997.

=== Guernsey ===
The law of Guernsey allows abortion under the same grounds as in Great Britain: at any time to save the woman's life, prevent grave permanent injury to her health, or in case of significant foetal impairment; and in the first 24 weeks of gestation in case of "risk, greater than if the pregnancy were terminated, of injury to the physical or mental health of the pregnant woman or any existing children of her family". As in Great Britain, the latter ground is considered to allow de facto elective abortion.

The conditions are specified in the Abortion (Guernsey) Law, 1997. As originally enacted, the law set a gestational limit of 24 weeks in case of foetal impairment and 12 weeks for risk to health greater than terminating the pregnancy, required the approval of two medical practitioners, and required that the abortion take place at Princess Elizabeth Hospital. The law was amended, effective from 2022, to remove the gestational limit for foetal impairment and increase the other limit to 24 weeks, to reduce the required approval to only one medical practitioner, to remove the location requirement, to allow nurses and midwives to perform abortions, and to decriminalise the act of a woman attempting to or succeeding in ending her own pregnancy outside of a medical setting.

The Guernsey law of 1997 and its amendment of 2022 do not apply to Alderney and Sark, which are also part of the Bailiwick of Guernsey but continue to apply an earlier law, in French, identical to the Offences against the Person Act 1861 of England and Wales, which does not explicitly mention any legal ground for abortion. However, the judicial decision Rex v Bourne in England and Wales clarified that the law always implicitly allowed abortion at least to save the woman's life, and the decision extended it also to preserve her health. It is unclear whether Alderney and Sark apply only the original legal principle or also the extension by the judicial decision.

In practice, abortions are provided in Alderney under the same conditions as in Guernsey, as health services in Alderney operate under Guernsey law. To clarify the legal situation, in 2022 the States of Alderney passed an abortion law identical to the one in Guernsey, but it awaits a regulation to establish the effective date.

=== Isle of Man ===
Since 24 May 2019, it is lawful in the Isle of Man to have an abortion during the first 14 weeks of pregnancy at will, then until the 24th week, so long as criteria specified by the act are met, and then onwards if there is a serious risk of grave injury or death. Abortion is governed by the Abortion Reform Act 2019.

== Statistics ==
=== Total number of abortions (including historical estimates) ===
1958 to 1989
Year	England & Wales	Scotland	Northern Ireland	Total
1958	13,570	-	-	13,570
1959	13,900	-	-	13,900
1960	14,000	-	-	14,000
1961	14,300	-	-	14,300
1962	16,800	-	-	16,800
1963	16,600	-	-	16,600
1964	18,300	-	-	18,300
1965	19,500	-	-	19,500
1966	21,400	-	-	21,400
1967	27,200	-	-	27,200
1968	23,641	1,544	-	25,185
1969	54,819	3,556	-	58,375
1970	86,565	5,254	-	91,819
1971	126,777	6,333	-	133,110
1972	159,884	7,609	-	167,493
1973	167,149	7,542	-	174,691
1974	162,940	7,568	-	170,508
1975	139,702	7,327	-	147,029
1976	129,673	7,219	-	136,892
1977	133,004	7,334	-	140,338
1978	141,558	7,451	-	149,009
1979	149,746	7,784	-	157,530
1980	160,903	7,905	-	168,808
1981	162,480	9,007	-	171,487
1982	163,045	8,425	-	171,470
1983	162,161	8,459	-	170,620
1984	169,993	9,155	-	179,148
1985	171,873	9,189	-	181,062
1986	172,286	9,628	-	181,914
1987	174,276	9,460	-	183,736
1988	183,798	10,128	-	193,926
1989	183,974	10,209	-	194,183

1990 to 2020
Year	England & Wales	Scotland	Northern Ireland	Total
1990	186,912	10,219	-	197,131
1991	179,522	11,068	-	190,590
1992	172,069	10,818	-	182,887
1993	168,714	11,076	-	179,790
1994	166,876	11,392	-	178,268
1995	163,638	11,143	-	174,781
1996	177,495	11,978	85	189,558
1997	179,746	12,109	79	191,934
1998	187,402	12,485	71	199,958
1999	183,250	12,168	83	195,501
2000	185,375	11,997	71	197,553
2001	186,274	12,128	76	198,478
2002	185,385	11,870	67	197,322
2003	190,660	12,308	64	203,032
2004	194,498	12,462	80	207,040
2005	194,353	12,665	79	207,097
2006	201,173	13,167	91	214,431
2007	205,598	13,778	78	219,454
2008	202,158	13,908	68	216,134
2009	195,743	13,112	75	208,930
2010	196,109	12,948	74	209,131
2011	196,082	12,558	38	208,678
2012	190,972	12,570	45	203,587
2013	190,800	11,946	32	202,778
2014	190,092	11,781	17	201,890
2015	191,014	12,141	16	203,171
2016	190,406	12,124	12	202,542
2017	197,533	12,531	12	210,076
2018	205,295	13,351	8	218,624
2019	209,519	13,606	89	223,214
2020	210,860	13,815	36	224,711
Total (2020)	9,231,163	549,308	1,446	9,781,917

Abortion statistics in the UK + England and Wales

Abortions in the UK over time

Percentage of conceptions leading to abortion in the UK

Live births + abortions in the UK

Abortions in England and Wales over time

Percentage of conceptions leading to abortion in age groups in England and Wales

Abortions by age group in England and Wales

Percentage of conceptions leading to an abortion over time in England and Wales

=== Legal abortions by ground ===
Statistics for legal abortions are published annually by the Department of Health and Social Care, for England and Wales, NHS Scotland, and the Department of Health in Northern Ireland. Where there is only a small number of abortions for a particular ground, the number is not published by statisticians to avoid the risk of disclosing the identity of the persons involved.

Legal abortions were carried out on the following grounds in England and Wales in 2020:

Abortion statistics for England and Wales 2020
Primary ground	Number	%	Notes
Grounds A/F/G	98	0.05	Risk to life of pregnant woman (or in emergencies)
Ground B	31	0.01	Prevent grave permanent injury to pregnant woman
Ground C	206,768	98.1	Risk of injury to physical/mental health of pregnant woman
Ground D	778	0.37	Risk of injury to physical/mental health of other children
Ground E	3,185	1.51	Physical or mental abnormality in unborn child
Total	210,860	100.0	

Nearly all (99.9%) of abortions carried out under Ground C alone were reported as being performed because of a risk to the woman's mental health and were classified as F99 (mental disorder, not otherwise specified) under the ICD-10 classification system.

Legal abortions were carried out on the following grounds in Scotland in the same year:

Termination of pregnancy statistics for Scotland 2020
Primary ground	Number	%	Notes
Grounds A/B/D/F/G	34	0.25	Risk to life of pregnant woman (and other grounds not listed below)
Ground C	13,572	98.2	Risk of injury to physical/mental health of pregnant woman
Ground E	209	1.51	Physical or mental abnormality in unborn child
Total	13,815	100.0	

In Northern Ireland, the total number of terminations in 2017–2018 was 12, followed by 8 in 2018–2019, and 22 in 2019–2020. As indicated above, for most of that time, abortions were permitted there if the act was to save the life of the mother, or if there was a risk of permanent and serious damage to the mental or physical health of the mother.

In 2020, a total of 371 women travelling from Northern Ireland received abortions in England and Wales:

- 367 – due to risk of injury to physical or mental health of the pregnant woman; and
- 4 – due to physical or mental abnormality in the unborn child.

In the same year, 194 women travelling from the Republic of Ireland received abortions in England and Wales:

- 131 – due to risk of injury to physical or mental health of the pregnant woman; and
- 63 – due to physical or mental abnormality in the unborn child.

The number of pregnant women from the island of Ireland travelling for an abortion was previously much more significant although this decreased following changes in legislation in both Northern Ireland and the Republic, and travel restrictions during the COVID-19 pandemic. Scottish statistics for abortion record the place of residence of the pregnant woman within Scotland (i.e. an NHS board or a local government area); these figures includes temporary addresses for students and a small number of women travelling to Scotland from elsewhere.

==== Ethnicity ====
The broad multi-ethnic group of those getting an abortion is as follows:

Ethnic group	Year										
Ethnic group	2002	2003	2005	2007	2009	2011	2013	2015	2017	2019	2021
Ethnic group	Percentage % (excludes Not Stated)										
White	75	76	74	75	76	76	76	77	78	77	78
Mixed / British Mixed	3	2	2	3	3	3	3	4	4	4	5
Asian / Asian British	7	7	8	8	9	10	9	9	9	9	9
Black / Black British	12	12	13	11	10	9	9	8	8	8	7
Chinese or other groups	3	3	3	3	2	2	3	2	2	2	1

By individual ethnic group, including numbers and those which do not state an ethnicity:

Ethnic group	Year (includes Not stated as percentage)							
Ethnic group	2006		2011		2016		2021	
Ethnic group	Population	%	Population	%	Population	%	Population	%
White: Total	123,847	63.9%	135,916	71.6%	138,958	74.9%	151,639	70.8%
White: British	111,888	57.8%	121,238	63.8%	120,284	64.8%	134,000	62.5%
White: Irish	920		912		1,163		1,194	
White: Other	11,039		13,766		17,511		16,445	
Asian or Asian British: Total	15,930	8.2%	19,657	10.3%	17,358	9.4%	18,089	8.4%
Asian or Asian British: Indian	5,685		6,840		5,989		6,945	
Asian or Asian British: Pakistani	3,080		3,715		3,867		4,389	
Asian or Asian British: Bangladeshi	1,335		1,691		1,625		1,741	
Asian or Asian British: Asian Other	3,799		5,419		4,323		4,176	
Asian or Asian British: Chinese	2,031		1,992		1,554		838	
Black or Black British: Total	19,652	10.1%	16,399	8.6%	13,876	7.5%	13,836	6.5%
Black or Black British: Caribbean	5,536		4,878		4,201		3,689	
Black or Black British: African	12,206		10,616		8,842		8,337	
Black or Black British: Other	1,910		905		833		1,810	
British Mixed: Total	4,260	2.2%	5,414	2.9%	6,675	3.6%	9,453	4.4%
Mixed: White and Caribbean	1,591		2,131		2,919		4,031	
Mixed: White and African	628		958		941		1,339	
Mixed: White and Asian Other	568		632		954		1,339	
Mixed: Other Mixed	1,473		1,693		1,861		2,744	
Other: Total	2,100	1.1%	2,300	1.2%	2,512	1.4%	1,209	0.6%
Other: Any other ethnic group	2,100	1.1%	2,300	1.2%	2,512	1.4%	1,209	0.6%
Not known/stated	27,948	14.4%	10,245	5.4%	6,217	3.3%	19,995	9.3%
Total	193,737	100%	189,931	100%	185,596	100%	214,256	100%

=== Legal abortions by gestation ===
A significant majority of abortions in Great Britain take place at less than 10 weeks of gestation. The numbers and percentages in England and Wales, Scotland, and Great Britain overall, were as follows in 2020. Information on gestation and abortion is not available in Northern Ireland for the same year.

Legal abortions by gestation weeks, 2020
Gestation	England and Wales	%	Scotland	%	Great Britain	%
3–9 weeks	185,559	88.0	12,108	87.6	197,667	88.0
10–12 weeks	11,654	5.5	983	7.1	12,637	5.6
13–19 weeks	10,736	5.4	651	4.7	11,387	5.1
20 weeks and over	2,911	1.4	73	0.5	2,984	1.3
Total	210,860	100	13,815	100	224,675	100

Percentage of conceptions which led to an abortion in English administrative districts in 2020 Less than 22% 22 to 24% 24 to 26% 26 to 30% More than 30%

Percentage of conceptions leading to Abortion in Wales Less than 22% 22 to 24% 24 to 26% 26 to 30% More than 30%

=== Legal abortions by nation/region ===
In 2020, the region with the largest number of abortions was London followed by South East England, the West Midlands and North West England. Statistics on abortion recorded at a regional level or national level (for England, Wales and Scotland individually) relate to residents. Abortions for non-residents are also recorded for England and Wales (collectively) although these were lower than usual (at 943 abortions) in that year due to travel restrictions during the COVID-19 pandemic. Information for Northern Ireland is recorded by financial year rather than calendar year, with 22 abortions recorded in 2019–2020.

Legal abortions by nation and region, 2020
Nation/Region	No. of abortions
London	42,630
South East England	28,723
South West England	15,008
East of England	19,819
West Midlands	23,159
East Midlands	14,806
North West England	29,927
Yorkshire and the Humber	18,013
North East England	7,998
England	200,083
Wales	9,834
England and Wales (residents)	209,917
England and Wales (non-residents)	934
Scotland	13,815
Great Britain	224,675

=== Abortion offences ===
Abortions carried out for grounds outside those permitted in law (e.g. in most cases after the 24-week term limit, or where appropriate consent has not been given) continue to be unlawful in each jurisdiction of the UK – under the Offences against the Person Act 1861 in England and Wales, Scottish common law, and the Northern Ireland Regulations. The Infant Life (Preservation) Act 1929 and the Criminal Justice Act (Northern Ireland) 1945 also outlaw child destruction in cases where the life of the unborn child would have been viable outside the womb.

With the increasing availability of medicines for abortion, the Medicines and Healthcare products Regulatory Agency has stated that medicines are not ordinary consumer goods and have the potential to cause harm as well as cure, and selling mifepristone with no medical qualifications is illegal and can be extremely dangerous for patients.

Home Office statistics for England and Wales recorded 224 offences in total for procuring an illegal abortion in 1900–1909, which increased to 527 in the subsequent decade, 651 in the 1920s, and 1,028 in the 1930s (although figures for 1939 are unavailable). The number of offences increased significantly from 1942 onwards, at the same time as the arrival of American military personnel during the Second World War, rising to 649 in 1944, and totalling 3,088 throughout the 1940s. The trend decreased but remained significant with 2,040 offences from 1950 to 1959 inclusive and 2,592 in the 1960s. However, there was a decrease from 212 offences in 1970 to three in 1979, alongside the implementation of the 1967 Act, and offences remained at single figures over the rest of the 20th Century. From 1931 to 2002, there were also 109 recorded cases of child destruction in the jurisdiction, as defined by the Infant Life (Preservation) Act 1929.

From 2002–2003 to 2008–2009, there were 30 cases of child destruction and 46 cases of illegal abortion in England and Wales followed by 61 cases of illegal abortion and 80 cases of child destruction in the subsequent decade (between 2009–2010 and 2019–2020 inclusive). Guidance from the Crown Prosecution Service lists procuring an abortion (unlawfully) as a child abuse offence and notes that some unlawful abortions may be carried out as honour-based crimes, which are committed to punish women for "alleged or perceived breaches of the family and/or community's code of behaviour."

Abortion and child destruction offences have historically only occasionally been recorded in Northern Ireland – a possible effect of the deterrent provided in law and the policing of a smaller jurisdiction. Between 1998 and 2018, the Royal Ulster Constabulary and the Police Service of Northern Ireland recorded 17 cases of procuring an illegal abortion and three cases of child destruction. In several years within that timeframe, no offences of this type were recorded.

In the absence of statute law on abortion in Scotland before 1967, medical and legal practice varied locally. General population comparisons between jurisdictions would indicate that Scotland would record fewer offences than England and Wales and more than Northern Ireland although figures are not routinely published.

In 2022, calls were made to formalise an offence of child destruction in Scotland, similar to other legal jurisdictions in the UK.

=== Trends since 1967 ===
Percentage of abortions in Great Britain by gestational age, 2004

Percentage of abortions in Great Britain by gestational age, 2019

Post 1967 there was a rapid increase in the annual number of legal abortions, and a decline in sepsis and death due to illegal abortions. In 1978 121,754 abortions were performed on women resident in the UK, and 28,015 on non-resident women. The rate of increase fell from the early 1970s and actually dipped from 1991 to 1995 before rising again. The age group with the highest number of abortions per 1000 is amongst those aged 20–24. 2006 statistics for England and Wales revealed that 48% of abortions occurred to women over the age of 25, 29% were aged 20–24; 21% aged under 20 and 2% under 16.

Conceptions leading to an abortion from 1969 to 2020
Year	1969	1971	1976	1981	1986	1991	1996	2001	2006	2011	2016	2020
Percentage of conceptions leading to an abortion	5.98%	11.32%	15.17%	17.09%	18.02%	19.6%	20.55%	23%	22.26%	20.88%	21.5%	25.29%

In 2004, there were 185,415 abortions in England and Wales. 87% of abortions were performed at 12 weeks or less and 1.6% (or 2,914 abortions) occurred after 20 weeks. Abortion is free to residents; 82% of abortions were carried out by the public tax-funded National Health Service.

The overwhelming majority of abortions (95% in 2004 for England and Wales) were certified under the statutory ground of risk of injury to the mental or physical health of the pregnant woman.

By 2009, the number of abortions had risen to 189,100. Of this number, 2,085 are as a result of doctors deciding that there is a substantial risk that if the child were born it would have such physical or mental abnormalities as to be seriously disabled.

In a written answer to Jim Allister, the Northern Ireland health minister Edwin Poots disclosed that 394 abortions were carried out in Northern hospitals for the period 2005/06 to 2009/10 with the footnote that reasons for abortions were not gathered centrally.

190,800 abortions were notified as taking place in England and Wales in 2013. 0.2% fewer than in 2012; 185,331 were to residents of England and Wales. The age-standardised rate was 15.9 abortions per 1,000 resident women aged 15–44 years; this rate increased from 11.0 in 1973, peaked at 17.9 in 2007, and fell to 15.9 in 2013. For comparison, the EU average is only 4.4aabortions per 1,000 women in child-bearing age.

Since approval of abortion in the UK in 1967 to 2014, 8,745,508 abortions have been performed.

In 2018, the total abortions in England and Wales was 205,295. In this year, the abortion rate was highest for those of the age of 21, and 81% were for those who were single.

=== Public opinion surveys and polls ===
Opinion polling and social attitudes surveys have regularly considered public opinion in relation to abortion in Britain since at least the 1980s. The British Social Attitudes (BSA) survey has asked a number of questions about abortion over the past 40 years and has found almost unanimous support for a right to have an abortion if the woman's health would be seriously endangered by going ahead with the pregnancy. Levels of support for abortion in a situation where the woman decides on her own she does not wish to have the child were lower, when the issue was considered in 2012, with just over six in ten (62 per cent) supporting and a third (34 per cent) opposing. However, this marked a considerable change since 1983 when 37 per cent thought the law should allow this while just over half (55 per cent) thought it should not.

The similar Northern Ireland Life and Times Survey has surveyed its respondents on abortion several times since 1998. In that year, 43% said that it was "always wrong" for a woman to have an abortion on economic grounds (i.e. "if the family has a very low income and cannot afford any more children") with 14% saying it was "not wrong at all" and a variety of other responses in between. The same responses were broadly found in 2008, when a large percentage of people (39 per cent) also affirmed that an embryo was "a human being at the moment of conception".

A specific set of questions, asked by the Life and Times Survey in 2016 and 2018, covered a wide range of issues around abortion and found the following levels of support for a range of potential grounds for abortion:

- 58% – fatal abnormality in unborn child;
- 54% – pregnancy caused by sexual crime;
- 46% – serious threat to health of pregnant woman;
- 45% – serious abnormality in unborn child;
- 25% – pregnant woman aged 15 (under age of consent);
- 18% – pregnant woman aged 51;
- 17% – pregnant woman prefers not to have children;
- 13% – pregnant woman who is living on low income;
- 12% – pregnant woman who has become unemployed;
- 11% – pregnant woman who is about to begin a new job.

An Amnesty International poll in 2014 also indicated that a majority of people in Northern Ireland agreed with changes in abortion law for three particular grounds i.e. where a pregnancy has occurred due to rape, or incest, or where a fatal foetal abnormality (or life-limiting condition) has been diagnosed in the unborn child.

A YouGov/Daily Telegraph survey in 2005 measured British public opinion regarding the gestational age at which abortion should be permitted, with the following levels of support:

- 2% – abortion being available throughout pregnancy;
- 25% – maintaining the term limit of 24 weeks;
- 30% – reducing the term limit to 20 weeks;
- 19% – reducing the term limit to 12 weeks;
- 9% – reducing the term limit to less than 12 weeks; and
- 6% – abortion not being allowed at any stage.

A further 2011 poll by MORI surveyed women's attitudes to abortion and found that:

- 53% agreed that if a woman wanted an abortion, she should not have to continue with her pregnancy (compared with 22% who neither agreed nor disagreed with the statement and 17% who disagreed);
- 37% agreed with the statement that "too many women do not think hard enough before having an abortion" (with 28% disagreeing and 26% neither agreeing nor disagreeing);
- 46% disagreed with introducing more restrictions on obtaining an abortion (with 23% agreeing and 23% neither agreeing nor disagreeing).

== Crisis pregnancy advice centres ==
The BBC Panorama team investigated crisis pregnancy advice centres and found over a third gave misleading medical information or unethical advice, or both. Panorama looked into 57 crisis pregnancy advice centres advertising, of these 34 sent users to the NHS website or regulated abortion providers. Roughly 21 centres gave misleading medical information and/or unethical advice. 7 centres suggested falsely abortion could cause mental health problems, 8 centres suggested falsely abortion could cause infertility, and 5 centres suggested falsely abortion could cause increased risk of breast cancer. Leading obstetrician Dr Jonathan Lord stated "There is no increased risk of serious mental illness, infertility, or breast cancer after an abortion. These centres are set up to target women who are struggling with their decision, and then give them false advice to try to sway them away from an abortion. They risk causing significant harm and damage to those especially-vulnerable patients." Jo Holmes, of the British Association for Counselling and Psychotherapy, stated the centre made biased and judgemental claims. "Counselling is about being able to explore what you're feeling in a safe place with no judgements, but any woman who went into a session like this would come out deeply traumatised."

== Approved methods ==
The methods used for abortion are divided in two categories:

- Medical abortion: carried out by the administration of two pills, one that contains mifepristone (orally) and 1 to 2 days later another one containing misoprostol (orally or vaginally).
- Surgical abortion: can be carried out by either
  - Vacuum aspiration: removing the pregnancy with suction done by a tube inserted into the uterus or
  - Dilation or evacuation (D&E): removing the pregnancy with instruments called forceps inserted into the uterus.

The provision of different methods is dependent on the stage of the pregnancy and policies. Medical abortions are typically available for up to 12 weeks but can also be used for termination in later stages. Vacuum aspiration is provided up to 14 weeks of pregnancy whereas D&E is provided after 14 weeks of pregnancy. When pregnancy progresses to after 20 weeks, the procedure becomes more complicated.

Since mifepristone was approved for use in Britain in 1991, the use of medical abortion has been on the rise continually and it is now the most commonly used method for abortion, especially for abortions in early pregnancy. In England and Wales, medical abortions accounted for 86% of all abortions from January to June 2022, the majority of which were carried out in the first 10 weeks of pregnancy. In Scotland, 99.4% of all abortions were carried out medically in 2021.

=== Early medical abortion at home ===
In 2011, the BPAS lost a High Court bid to force the Health Secretary to allow women undertaking early medical abortions in England, Scotland and Wales to administer the second dose of drug treatment at home. However, this decision was later reversed in 2019, permitting women to take both pills at home up to 10 weeks gestation. The temporary changes were also linked to an increase in abortions during the COVID-19 pandemic's first year. An evaluation of this service showed that it was safe and effective, with shorter waiting times, and preferred by those who had gone through it.

On 24 February 2022, the Department of Health announced that the "pills at home" scheme was going to be scrapped in England. At the same time, Wales has announced that they intend to make the scheme permanent. Before deciding whether or not to make the scheme permanent, all three countries in the United Kingdom held a public consultation. MPs later voted to amend the Health and Care Bill 2022 to make the scheme permanent, allowing telemedical abortion care up to the tenth week of pregnancy.

On 12 June 2023, a woman was sentenced to over two years in prison for inducing an abortion after the legal limit through the "pills by post" scheme by misleading the BPAS and falsely saying she was below the 10 week cutoff (she was believed to be 28 weeks pregnant at the time). This was later reduced to 14 months suspended sentence after being sent to the Court of Appeal. This led to a number of abortion-rights advocates, women's-rights groups, politicians and medics to call on the British government to reform its abortion laws.

== Abortions in prisons ==
The HMPPS policy (covering England and Wales) for women who wish to get an abortion while incarcerated includes that prisons are required to ensure timely access to termination support services for women requiring them. This policy also states that following a termination women must be allowed to rest, or in the case of a medical termination, pass the pregnancy in privacy.

In practice, it is difficult to determine how easily women are able to access abortion or what support women are given in relation to decisions to terminate a pregnancy. There is little research in this area.

A Freedom of Information Request to the Department of Health and Social Care (FOI-11107442) in 2017 asking how many women who reside in prison obtained abortions over the period 2006 to 2016 showed that, on average, 30 women access abortion while in prison each year.

== See also ==
- Abortion debate
- Abortion law
- Abortion Rights (organisation)
- Abortion Services (Safe Access Zones) (Scotland) Act 2024
- Abortion Support Network
- Fathers' rights movement in the United Kingdom
- Halsbury's Laws of England
- Halsbury's Statutes
- Lobbying in the United Kingdom
- Religion and abortion
- Sister Supporter

== General bibliography ==
- Ormerod, David; Hooper, Anthony (2011), "Homicide and related offences: abortion", in Ormerod, David; Hooper, Anthony, eds. (13 October 2011). Blackstone's criminal practice, 2012. Oxford: Oxford University Press. pp. 226–230. ISBN 978-0-19-969438-9.
- Richardson, P.J., ed. (1999). Archbold: criminal pleading, evidence and practice. London: Sweet & Maxwell. ISBN 978-0-421-63720-7. Chapter 19. Section III. Paras 19–149 to 19–165.
- Ormerod, David C. (2011), "Section 16.5 Further homicide and related offences: Child destruction and abortion", in Ormerod, David C. (ed.), Smith and Hogan's criminal law (13th ed.), Oxford New York: Oxford University Press, pp. 602–615, ISBN 978-0-19-958649-3.
- Card, Richard (1992), "Abortion law", in Card, Richard; Cross, Rupert; Jones, Philip (eds.), Criminal law (12th ed.), London: Butterworths, pp. 230–235, ISBN 978-0-406-00086-6.
