= Child destruction =

Statutory offence

Child destruction is the name of a statutory offence in England and Wales, Northern Ireland, Hong Kong and in some parts of Australia.

Child destruction is the crime of killing an unborn but viable foetus; that is, a child "capable of being born alive", before it has "a separate existence".

People have been convicted of the offence for injuring a heavily pregnant woman in the abdomen, such that her foetus dies; for killing a foetus during childbirth; or for performing a late-term abortion.

The purpose of the offence is to criminalise the killing of a child during its birth, because this is neither abortion nor homicide for the purposes of the criminal law. It can also be used to prosecute late abortions.

During the second reading of the Preservation of Infant Life Bill 1928 to 1929, Lord Atkin said:

As the noble and learned Lord has explained, the gap is that, whereas the mother of a child who kills it after it has a separate existence is guilty of what was the crime of murder and is now the lesser offence of infanticide, yet, if she kills the child in the actual course of delivery or within such a short time afterwards that it has not had and cannot be proved to have had a separate existence, it is not an offence.

== England and Wales ==
=== Statute ===
In England and Wales, the offence is created by section 1(1) of the Infant Life (Preservation) Act 1929:

(1) Subject as hereinafter in this subsection provided, any person who, with intent to destroy the life of a child capable of being born alive, by any wilful act causes a child to die before it has an existence independent of its mother, shall be guilty of felony, to wit, of child destruction, and shall be liable on conviction thereof on indictment to penal servitude for life:

Provided that no person shall be found guilty of an offence under this section unless it is proved that the act which caused the death of the child was not done in good faith for the purpose only of preserving the life of the mother.

(2) For the purposes of this Act, evidence that a woman had at any material time been pregnant for a period of twenty-eight weeks or more shall be primâ facie proof that she was at that time pregnant of a child capable of being born alive.

==== "Capable of being born alive" ====
See C v S [1988] QB 135, [1987] 2 WLR 1108, [1987] 1 All ER 1230, [1987] 2 FLR 505, (1987) 17 Fam Law 269, CA (Civ Div)

In a 1991 case Brooke J said that a child is "born alive" if "after birth, it exists as a live child, that is to say breathing and living by reason of its breathing through its own lungs alone, without deriving any of its living or power of living by or through any connection with its mother."

As originally enacted, section 5(1) of the Abortion Act 1967 described the Infant Life (Preservation) Act 1929 with suffix "(protecting the life of the viable foetus)". It was held that this description would not alter its effect. The defence suggestion that "viable" had a narrower meaning thus described fewer foetuses than "capable of being born alive" was rejected in 1991.

By 2000, David Ormerod opines that a definition of "born alive" taken from the 1991 case is not of universal application and that an example of a case where it was not applicable was Re A (conjoined twins), where a conjoined twin who never drew breath was considered to have been born alive.

Applicability after 28 weeks' gestation has been reduced to 24 weeks.

==== "Felony" ====
The distinction between felony and misdemeanour was abolished by the Criminal Law Act 1967. That Act directs that "any enactment creating an offence by directing it to be felony shall be read as directing it to be an offence".

==== "Penal servitude" ====
The reference to a sentence of penal servitude must be construed as a reference to a sentence of imprisonment: The Criminal Justice Act 1948, section 1(1).

=== Defence ===
A registered medical practitioner who terminates a pregnancy in accordance with the provisions of the Abortion Act 1967 does not commit this offence.

=== Mode of trial ===
Child destruction is an indictable-only offence.

=== Sentence ===
Child destruction is punishable with imprisonment for life or for any shorter term.

=== Early release of prisoners ===
Child destruction is an "excluded offence" for the purposes of section 32 of the Criminal Justice Act 1982.

=== History ===
Before 1 April 1991, section 5(1) of the Abortion Act 1967 provided that nothing in that Act affected the provisions of the Infant Life (Preservation) Act 1929. That section was substituted by section 37(4) of the Human Fertilisation and Embryology Act 1990.

=== Incidence ===
The charge of child destruction is rare. There were ten cases in the ten years to 1987. When a woman who had a backstreet abortion while 7½ months pregnant was given a suspended sentence of 12 months in 2007, the Crown Prosecution Service was unaware of any similar conviction. In 2000, a man stamped on his girlfriend's abdomen and thereby caused her to go into premature labour. Since he had intended to kill the foetus in the womb, whereas in fact the baby died shortly after birth, he was convicted of manslaughter and attempted child destruction.

In 2012, a woman who self-administered an abortion drug when 39 weeks pregnant was convicted of unlawful abortion under the 1861 Act. The sentencing judge remarked that she might equally have been charged with child destruction.

In 2015, Kevin Wilson and an accomplice, who was under eighteen and could not be legally named, were convicted of child destruction and grievous bodily harm after they beat and kicked Wilson's pregnant ex-girlfriend, causing fatal injuries to the foetus.

== Northern Ireland ==
In Northern Ireland law, the offence is created by section 25(1) of the Criminal Justice Act (Northern Ireland) 1945.

=== Sentence ===
Child destruction is punishable with imprisonment for life or for any shorter term.

=== Use ===
The first conviction for this offence was in 2000. The coroner reporting on the 1998 Omagh bombing recommended that the Director of Public Prosecutions for Northern Ireland should prosecute for two counts of child destruction as well as 29 of murder, as one of the people killed was 34 weeks pregnant with twins.

== Australia ==
Each state and territory of Australia has a separate criminal code. The offence is called "killing unborn child" and can be committed only around the time of childbirth in Queensland, Western Australia, and the Northern Territory. It is called "causing death of child before birth" in Tasmania. In South Australia, it comes under the heading of "abortion". The definition is somewhat broader in the Australian Capital Territory, and comparably broad to English law in Tasmania and South Australia. The offence was abolished in Victoria by the Abortion Law Reform Act 2008.

New South Wales does not have a child destruction enactment, but the Crimes Amendment (Grievous Bodily Harm) Act 2005 (NSW) amended the Crimes Act 1900 (NSW) so that s 4(1)(a) now defines "grievous bodily harm" as including "the destruction (other than in the course of a medical procedure) of the foetus of a pregnant woman, whether or not the woman suffers any other harm".

== Hong Kong ==
Child destruction is defined in section 47B of the Offences against the Person Ordinance. A person guilty of child destruction is liable to be punished as though he was guilty of manslaughter. This means that he is liable to imprisonment for life and to pay such fine as the court may award.

== See also ==
- Born alive rule
- Foeticide
