= List of acts of the Parliament of Victoria from 2008 =

This is a list of acts of the Parliament of Victoria, Australia for the year 2008.

== 2008 ==
Short title, or popular name	Citation	Royal assent
Long title
Equal Opportunity Amendment (Family Responsibilities) Act 2008	No. 1 of 2008	11 February 2008
An Act to amend the Equal Opportunity Act 1995 (Note: Equal Opportunity Act 1995 (No. 42 of 1995)) to expand the range of what constitutes discrimination against parents or carers in employment or employment-related areas and for other purposes.
Fair Trading and Consumer Acts Further Amendment Act 2008	No. 2 of 2008	
Children's Services and Education Legislation Amendment (Anaphylaxis Management) Act 2008	No. 3 of 2008	
Motor Car Traders Amendment Act 2008	No. 4 of 2008	
Classification (Publications, Films and Computer Games) (Enforcement) Amendment Act 2008	No. 5 of 2008	
Consumer Credit (Victoria) and Other Acts Amendment Act 2008 (repealed)	No. 6 of 2008	
(Repealed by Statute Law Repeals Act 2012 (No. 30 of 2012))
Crimes Amendment (Child Homicide) Act 2008	No. 7 of 2008	
Criminal Procedure Legislation Amendment Act 2008	No. 8 of 2008	
Infringements and Other Acts Amendment Act 2008	No. 9 of 2008	
Legislation Reform (Repeals No. 1) Act 2008	No. 10 of 2008	18 March 2008
An Act to repeal certain spent or redundant Acts relating to local government, health, housing, community services and other matters.
Professional Boxing and Combat Sports Amendment Act 2008	No. 11 of 2008	
Relationships Act 2008	No. 12 of 2008	15 April 2008
An Act to establish a relationships register in Victoria for the registration of domestic relationships, to provide for relationship agreements, to provide for property adjustment between domestic partners and for maintenance, to repeal Part IX of the Property Law Act 1958, (Note: Property Law Act 1958 (No. 6344)) to make consequential amendments to other Acts and for other purposes.
Co-operatives and Private Security Acts Amendment Act 2008	No. 13 of 2008	
Crown Land (Reserves) Amendment (Carlton Gardens) Act 2008	No. 14 of 2008	
Essential Services Commission Amendment Act 2008	No. 15 of 2008	
Legislation Reform (Repeals No. 2) Act 2008	No. 16 of 2008	23 April 2008
An Act to repeal certain spent Acts.
Drugs, Poisons and Controlled Substances Amendment Act 2008	No. 17 of 2008	
Justice Legislation Amendment (Sex Offences Procedure) Act 2008	No. 18 of 2008	
Education and Training Reform Amendment Act 2008	No. 19 of 2008	
Environment Protection Amendment (Landfill Levies) Act 2008	No. 20 of 2008	
Justice Legislation Amendment Act 2008	No. 21 of 2008	
Children's Legislation Amendment Act 2008	No. 22 of 2008	
Constitution Amendment (Judicial Pensions) Act 2008	No. 23 of 2008	3 June 2008
An Act to amend the Constitution Act 1975, (Note: Constitution Act 1975 (No. 8750)) the County Court Act 1958, (Note: County Court Act 1958 (No. 6230)) the Supreme Court Act 1986, (Note: Supreme Court Act 1986 (No. 110 of 1986)) the Attorney-General and Solicitor-General Act 1972, (Note: Attorney-General and Solicitor-General Act 1972 (No. 8305)) the Magistrates' Court Act 1989 (Note: Magistrates' Court Act 1989 (No. 51 of 1989)) and the Public Prosecutions Act 1994 (Note: Public Prosecutions Act 1994 (No. 43 of 1994)) and for other purposes.
Courts Legislation Amendment (Associate Judges) Act 2008	No. 24 of 2008	3 June 2008
Energy and Resources Legislation Amendment Act 2008	No. 25 of 2008	3 June 2008
Land (Revocation of Reservations) Act 2008	No. 26 of 2008	3 June 2008
Public Sector Employment (Award Entitlements) Amendment Act 2008	No. 27 of 2008	3 June 2008
Uniting Church in Australia Amendment Act 2008	No. 28 of 2008	3 June 2008
An Act to amend The Uniting Church in Australia Act 1977, (Note: Uniting Church in Australia Act 1977 (No. 9021)) to consequentially amend other Acts and for other purposes.
Drugs, Poisons and Controlled Substances (Volatile Substances) (Repeal) Act 2008	No. 29 of 2008	
National Gas (Victoria) Act 2008	No. 30 of 2008	17 June 2008
An Act to establish a framework to enable third parties to gain access to certain natural gas pipeline services, to repeal the Gas Pipelines Access (Victoria) Act 1998, (Note: Gas Pipelines Access (Victoria) Act 1998 (No. 31 of 1998)) to consequentially amend the Federal Courts (State Jurisdiction) Act 1999, (Note: Federal Courts (State Jurisdiction) Act 1999 (No. 54 of 1999)) the Gas Industry Act 2001, (Note: Gas Industry Act 2001 (No. 31 of 2001)) the Interpretation of Legislation Act 1984 (Note: Interpretation of Legislation Act 1984 (No. 10096)) and the Pipelines Act 2005 (Note: Pipelines Act 2005 (No. 61 of 2005)) and for other purposes.
State Taxation Acts Amendment Act 2008	No. 31 of 2008	
Appropriation (2008/2009) Act 2008 (repealed)	No. 32 of 2008	27 June 2008
An Act for the appropriation of certain sums out of the Consolidated Fund for the ordinary annual services of the Government for the financial year 2008/2009 and for other purposes. (Repealed by Statute Law Repeals Act 2012 (No. 30 of 2012))
Appropriation (Parliament 2008/2009) Act 2008 (repealed)	No. 33 of 2008	27 June 2008
An Act for the appropriation of certain sums out of the Consolidated Fund for the Parliament in respect of the financial year 2008/2009 and for other purposes. (Repealed by Statute Law Repeals Act 2012 (No. 30 of 2012))
Police Integrity Act 2008	No. 34 of 2008	
Local Government Amendment (Elections) Act 2008	No. 35 of 2008	
Building Amendment Act 2008	No. 36 of 2008	
Cancer Amendment (HPV) Act 2008	No. 37 of 2008	
Courts Legislation Amendment (Juries and Other Matters) Act 2008	No. 38 of 2008	
Crimes (Controlled Operations) Amendment Act 2008	No. 39 of 2008	
Gambling Regulation Amendment (Licensing) Act 2008	No. 40 of 2008	
Land (Revocation of Reservations) (Convention Centre Land) Act 2008	No. 41 of 2008	
Melbourne Cricket Ground Amendment Act 2008	No. 42 of 2008	
Superannuation Legislation Amendment Act 2008	No. 43 of 2008	
Unclaimed Money Act 2008	No. 44 of 2008	
Wildlife Amendment (Marine Mammals) Act 2008	No. 45 of 2008	
Public Health and Wellbeing Act 2008	No. 46 of 2008	2 September 2008
An Act to enact a new legislative scheme which promotes and protects public health and wellbeing in Victoria, to amend the Health Act 1958, (Note: Health Act 1958 (No. 6270)) the Food Act 1984 (Note: Food Act 1984 (No. 10082)) and certain other Acts, to repeal the Health Act 1958 and consequentially amend certain other Acts and for other purposes.
Evidence Act 2008	No. 47 of 2008	
Heritage Amendment Act 2008	No. 48 of 2008	
Summary Offences Amendment (Tattooing and Body Piercing) Act 2008	No. 49 of 2008	
Corrections Amendment Act 2008	No. 50 of 2008	
County Court Amendment (Koori Court) Act 2008	No. 51 of 2008	
Family Violence Protection Act 2008	No. 52 of 2008	23 September 2008
An Act to make provision for a system of family violence intervention orders and other matters relating to the prevention of family violence, to repeal the Crimes (Family Violence) Act 1987 (Note: Crimes (Family Violence) Act 1987 (No. 19 of 1987)) and for other purposes.
Legislation Reform (Repeals No. 3) Act 2008	No. 53 of 2008	23 September 2008
An Act to repeal certain spent Acts.
National Parks and Crown Land (Reserves) Acts Amendment Act 2008	No. 54 of 2008	
Public Holidays Amendment Act 2008	No. 55 of 2008	
Road Safety Amendment (Fatigue Management) Act 2008	No. 56 of 2008	
Whistleblowers Protection Amendment Act 2008	No. 57 of 2008	
Abortion Law Reform Act 2008	No. 58 of 2008	22 October 2008
An Act to reform the law relating to abortion, to amend the Crimes Act 1958 (Note: Crimes Act 1958 (No. 6231)) and for other purposes.
Energy Legislation Amendment (Retail Competition and Other Matters) Act 2008	No. 59 of 2008	22 October 2008
An Act to amend the Electricity Industry Act 2000, (Note: Electricity Industry Act 2000 (No. 68 of 2000)) the Gas Industry Act 2001, the Gas Safety Act 1997, (Note: Gas Safety Act 1997 (No. 99 of 1997)) the Electricity Safety Act 1998, (Note: Electricity Safety Act 1998 (No. 25 of 1998)) the National Electricity (Victoria) Amendment Act 2007, (Note: National Electricity (Victoria) Amendment Act 2007 (No. 66 of 2007)) the National Gas (Victoria) Act 2008 (Note: National Gas (Victoria) Act 2008 (No. 30 of 2008)) and for other purposes.
Major Crime (Investigative Powers) and Other Acts Amendment Act 2008	No. 60 of 2008	
Greenhouse Gas Geological Sequestration Act 2008	No. 61 of 2008	5 November 2008
An Act to regulate the injection, and permanent storage, of greenhouse gas substances in onshore Victoria and to make consequential amendments to other Acts and for other purposes.
Labour and Industry (Repeal) Act 2008	No. 62 of 2008	5 November 2008
An Act to repeal the Labour and Industry Act 1958, (Note: Labour and Industry Act 1958 (No. 6283)) to amend the ANZAC Day Act 1958, (Note: Anzac Day Act 1958 (No. 6198)) to re-enact certain provisions relating to the closure of factories and warehouses on ANZAC Day and to make consequential amendments to other Acts and for other purposes.
Medical Research Institutes Repeal Act 2008	No. 63 of 2008	
Health Professions Registration Amendment Act 2008	No. 64 of 2008	
Compensation and Superannuation Legislation Amendment Act 2008	No. 65 of 2008	
Dangerous Goods Amendment (Transport) Act 2008	No. 66 of 2008	
Local Government Amendment (Councillor Conduct and Other Matters) Act 2008	No. 67 of 2008	
Stalking Intervention Orders Act 2008 (repealed)	No. 68 of 2008	18 November 2008
An Act to provide for a system of intervention orders in cases of stalking and for other purposes. (Repealed by Personal Safety Intervention Orders Act 2010 (No. 53 of 2010))
Asbestos Diseases Compensation Act 2008	No. 69 of 2008	
Education and Training Reform Further Amendment Act 2008	No. 70 of 2008	
Gambling Legislation Amendment (Responsible Gambling and Other Measures) Act 2008	No. 71 of 2008	
Prohibition of Human Cloning for Reproduction Act 2008	No. 72 of 2008	
Racing and Gambling Legislation Amendment Act 2008	No. 73 of 2008	
Research Involving Human Embryos Act 2008	No. 74 of 2008	
Water (Commonwealth Powers) Act 2008	No. 75 of 2008	4 December 2008
An Act to refer certain matters relating to water management to the Commonwealth Parliament for the purposes of section 51(xxxvii) of the Constitution of the Commonwealth and to amend the Murray-Darling Basin Act 1993 (Note: Murray-Darling Basin Act 1993 (No. 39 of 1993)) to provide for the carrying out of an agreement between the Commonwealth, New South Wales, Victoria, Queensland, South Australia and the Australian Capital Territory with regard to the water resources of the Murray-Darling Basin, to repeal all provision in that Act as to any former agreement revoked by that agreement, to make consequential amendments to the Snowy Hydro Corporatisation Act 1997 (Note: Snowy Hydro Corporatisation Act 1997 (No. 105 of 1997)) and the Water Act 1989 (Note: Water Act 1989 (No. 80 of 1989)) to repeal the Murray-Darling Basin Amendment Act 2007 (Note: Murray-Darling Basin Amendment Act 2007 (No. 3 of 2007)) and for other purposes.
Assisted Reproductive Treatment Act 2008	No. 76 of 2008	11 December 2008
An Act to regulate assisted reproductive treatment and artificial insemination, to make provision with respect to surrogacy arrangements, to repeal the Infertility Treatment Act 1995, (Note: Infertility Treatment Act 1995 (No. 63 of 1995)) to amend the Status of Children Act 1974 (Note: Status of Children Act 1974 (No. 8602)) and the Births, Deaths and Marriages Registration Act 1996 (Note: Births, Deaths and Marriages Registration Act 1996 (No. 43 of 1996)) and other Acts and for other purposes.
Coroners Act 2008	No. 77 of 2008	11 December 2008
An Act to require the reporting of certain deaths, to provide for the investigation of deaths and fires by coroners in certain circumstances with the intention of finding the causes of deaths and fires and contributing to the reduction of the number of preventable deaths and fires, to establish the Coroners Court of Victoria and the Coronial Council of Victoria, to amend the Coroners Act 1985 (Note: Coroners Act 1985 (No. 10257)) to repeal the provisions relating to coroners and to rename that Act to continue to provide for the Victorian Institute of Forensic Medicine, to make consequential amendments to other Acts and for other purposes.
Courts Legislation Amendment (Costs Court and Other Matters) Act 2008	No. 78 of 2008	11 December 2008
Health Services Legislation Amendment Act 2008	No. 79 of 2008	11 December 2008
Multicultural Victoria Amendment Act 2008	No. 80 of 2008	11 December 2008
Professional Standards and Legal Profession Acts Amendment Act 2008	No. 81 of 2008	11 December 2008
An Act to amend the Professional Standards Act 2003 (Note: Professional Standards Act 2003 (No. 100 of 2003)) to implement a framework for mutual recognition of professional standards schemes, to make other amendments to that Act, to amend the Legal Profession Act 2004 (Note: Legal Profession Act 2004 (No. 99 of 2004)) to make further provision regarding complaints about legal practitioners and for other purposes.
Prostitution Control and Other Matters Amendment Act 2008	No. 82 of 2008	11 December 2008
An Act to amend the Prostitution Control Act 1994, (Note: Prostitution Control Act 1994 (No. 102 of 1994)) the Second-Hand Dealers and Pawnbrokers Act 1989 (Note: Second-Hand Dealers and Pawnbrokers Act 1989 (No. 54 of 1989)) and the Energy Legislation Amendment (Retail Competition and Other Matters) Act 2008 (Note: Energy Legislation Amendment (Retail Competition and Other Matters) Act 2008 (No. 59 of 2008)) and for other purposes.
Salaries Legislation Amendment (Salary Sacrifice) Act 2008	No. 83 of 2008	11 December 2008
An Act to amend the Constitution Act 1975, the Attorney-General and Solicitor-General Act 1972, the County Court Act 1958, the Magistrates' Court Act 1989, the Parliamentary Salaries and Superannuation Act 1968, (Note: Parliamentary Salaries and Superannuation Act 1968 (No. 7723)) the Public Administration Act 2004, (Note: Public Administration Act 2004 (No. 108 of 2004)) the Public Prosecutions Act 1994 and the Victorian Civil and Administrative Tribunal Act 1998 (Note: Victorian Civil and Administrative Tribunal Act 1998 (No. 53 of 1998)) in relation to salary sacrifice and for other purposes.
State Taxation Acts Further Amendment Act 2008	No. 84 of 2008	11 December 2008
An Act to amend the Duties Act 2000, (Note: Duties Act 2000 (No. 79 of 2000)) the Livestock Disease Control Act 1994, (Note: Livestock Disease Control Act 1994 (No. 115 of 1994)) the First Home Owner Grant Act 2000 (Note: First Home Owner Grant Act 2000 (No. 5 of 2000)) and the Taxation Administration Act 1997 (Note: Taxation Administration Act 1997 (No. 40 of 1997)) and for other purposes.
Transport Legislation Amendment (Driver and Industry Standards) Act 2008	No. 85 of 2008	11 December 2008
An Act to amend the Transport Act 1983 (Note: Transport Act 1983 (No. 9921)) and for other purposes.

== Sources ==
- "Acts as made: 2008". Victoria Legislation.
