= Grieve amendment =

Grieve amendment may refer to a number of amendments tabled by Dominic Grieve, mostly associated with parliamentary votes on Brexit, including:

- Amendments to the European Union (Withdrawal) Act 2018:
  - Alteration of Clause 9 (Amendment 7), designed so parliament would have a final say on any UK-EU deal;
  - Alternative amendment by Grieve, designed to force the prime minister to report to parliament in the event of a no-deal Brexit and gain parliamentary approval for any future plans;
  - Government compromise amendment, requires the prime minister to report to parliament but does not require any parliamentary approval for future plans;
- Amendment to the Northern Ireland (Executive Formation etc) Act 2019, designed to prevent the prorogation of parliament in the run up to the 31 October Brexit deadline.
