= Victoria Cottage Hospital, Guernsey =

Former hospital in Guernsey

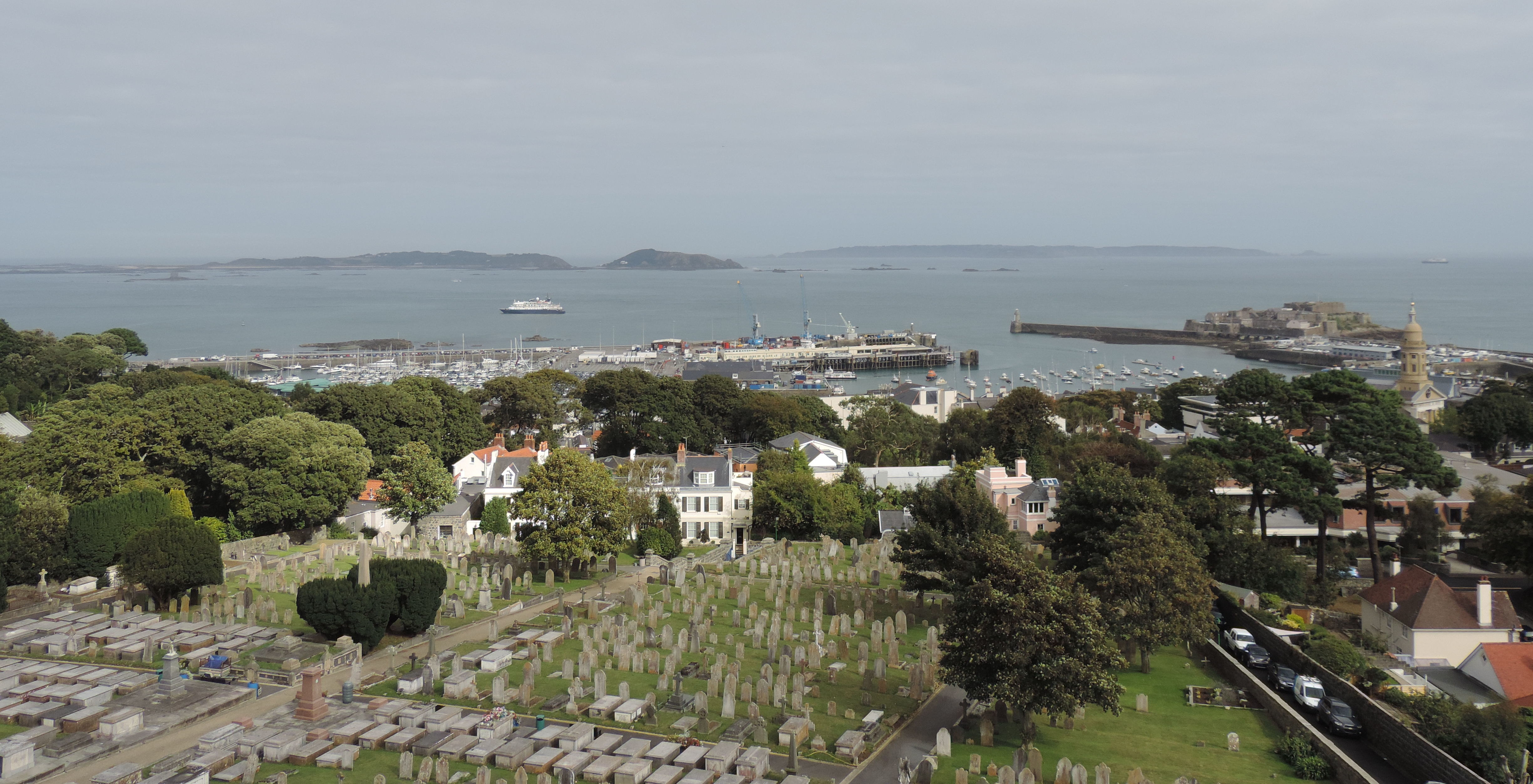
Victoria Cottage Hospital was in Candie Road

Victoria Cottage Hospital Guernsey was a cottage hospital in Guernsey, which opened in 1888. It closed in 1940 during the German occupation of the Channel Islands. The hospital was not reopened after liberation.

== History ==
On 1 May 1888 a cottage hospital was opened by the Bailiff, Sir Edgar MacCulloch for the sick needy poor in Cambridge Park, Guernsey. The hospital was the idea of Dr Ernest Laurie Robinson, who had also established a local branch of the St John Ambulance and a Voluntary Nursing Corps in the two years previous. Donations were made to fund the hospital by the local community.

The Victoria Cottage Hospital was initially staffed by volunteer nurses and a trained superintendent. It was smaller than the general hospital, and when it first opened, it had just five beds and a child's cot in two wards. Patients paid to have a bed (around 4 shillings in 1888). Only a few months after the hospital opened, a patient with bladder stones underwent successful experimental surgery that was written up in The Lancet.

The Victoria Cottage Hospital soon expanded and in 1891 it moved to larger premises and had 13 beds. During the First World War, it became an auxiliary military hospital. During the Second World War, the Victoria Hospital was converted to an emergency hospital to deal with casualties of the conflict. It closed in 1940 during the German occupation of the Channel Islands. Matron Hall of the hospital went with other staff to the country hospital, where they continued to provide care throughout the occupation.

In 1949, the new purpose-built Princess Elizabeth Hospital was opened.

== Notable staff ==
- Mary Christiana Gadsby, Matron 1890-1896, trained at The London Hospital under Eva Luckes; she resigned because of ill health.
- Captain John Follett Bullar FRCS was ophthalmic surgeon at the hospital and also bred pedigree goats.
