= Abortion Law Reform Act 2008 =

Parliament of Victoria
- Long title: An Act to reform the law relating to abortion, to amend the Crimes Act 1958 and for other purposes.
- Citation: No. 58 of 2008
- Royal assent: 22 October 2008

The Abortion Law Reform Act 2008 (No. 58 of 2008) is an abortion law reform passed by the Victorian Parliament in the Australian state of Victoria in 2008. The reform bill sought to amend section 65 of the Crimes Act 1958, which had codified the common law offences relating to abortion. The reform also repealed section 10 of the Crimes Act 1958 dealing with a separate offence of child destruction.

The amendment was moved on behalf of the Brumby Labor Government by the Women's Affairs Minister, Maxine Morand, and was based on a Victorian Law Reform Commission report tabled in the Victorian Parliament on 28 May 2008 which recommended the removal of abortion from the Victorian Crimes Act 1958. All political parties allowed members of Parliament to have a conscience vote, and in October 2008 the bill was passed by both houses, as the Abortion Law Reform Act 2008.

== Changes ==
Under the act, a woman is able to access abortion up to a gestational limit of 24 weeks. After that point a medical practitioner is able to provide an abortion if another practitioner agrees that an abortion is appropriate in all the circumstances.

As amended by the Abortion Law Reform Act 2008, section 65 of the Crimes Act 1958 states that only a qualified medical practitioner may perform an abortion on another person. A violation carries a maximum penalty of ten years imprisonment. Registered nurses and registered pharmacist are also qualified if they are administering a drug or drugs to terminate pregnancy in accordance with the amended act.

A female of any age who consents to, or assists in, the performance of an abortion on herself is not guilty of an offence against the section.

== Abortions after 24 weeks ==
The amended act allows for abortions after 24 weeks, but only if the medical practitioner:

- reasonably believes that the abortion is appropriate in all the circumstances, and
- has consulted at least one other registered medical practitioner who also reasonably believes that the abortion is appropriate in all the circumstances.

In determining whether the circumstances warrant an abortion after 24 weeks, the registered medical practitioner must have regard to:

- all relevant medical circumstances, and
- the woman's current and future physical, psychological and social circumstances.

Medical practitioners who perform abortions after 24 weeks can still face criminal penalties if it is deemed that they have incorrectly determined the "appropriateness" of the abortion.

Only pharmacists employed by a hospital may administer or supply a drug or drugs for an abortion after 24 weeks, and then only at the "written direction of a registered medical practitioner".

Abortion is available in Victoria from 24 week to pre birth with a medical consent.

== Medical practitioners conscientious objection ==
The act allows medical practitioners and nurses who have a conscientious objection to abortion to refuse to undertake or assist in the procedure, but they must inform the patient of their position, and the patient must also be supplied with information about a medical practitioner who does not have any such objection.

Regardless of their personal objections, medical practitioners and nurses have a duty to perform or assist in performing an emergency abortion if the pregnant woman's life is in danger.

== Attempted amendments ==
During the debate, various members of Parliament moved up to 40 amendments to the bill, the majority of which sought to either change the 24-week upper limit on unrestricted abortions or impose other restrictions. Some of the amendments moved in the Legislative Assembly sought to:

- provide support/counselling for women.
- provide information to women on the health risks of abortion.
- uphold the right of healthcare workers not to participate in abortion or refer someone for an abortion.
- ban late-term and partial-birth abortion.
- ensure mandatory reporting of suspected child/teenage victims of sexual abuse if a suspected abuser takes them to an abortion clinic.
- ensure that the custodial parent of a minor seeking an abortion was informed about the request.
- require abortion providers to administer an anaesthetic to the fetus.
- protect the life of a child born alive after an abortion.
- provide legal protection for a fetus seriously injured during an assault on the mother.

None of the amendments was agreed to by the Assembly.

During 2014, former Liberal MP Geoff Shaw unsuccessfully attempted to introduce a series of amendments in a private members bill which included resuscitating babies aborted alive.

== See also ==
- Late termination of pregnancy
