= Infant Life (Preservation) Act 1929 =

Act of the Parliament of the United Kingdom

Infant Life (Preservation) Act 1929 (Note: Section 3(1).)
- Act of Parliament
- Parliament of the United Kingdom
- Long title: An Act to amend the law with regard to the destruction of children at or before birth.
- Citation: 19 & 20 Geo. 5. c. 34
- Territorial extent: England and Wales (Note: Section 3(2).)

Dates
- Royal assent: 10 May 1929
- Commencement: 10 May 1929 (Note: The Acts of Parliament (Commencement) Act 1793)
Other legislation
Amends	Offences against the Person Act 1861
Amended by	Criminal Law Act 1967; Police and Criminal Evidence Act 1984
Relates to	Abortion Act 1967

Status: Amended

Text of statute as originally enacted

Revised text of statute as amended

Text of the Infant Life (Preservation) Act 1929 as in force today (including any amendments) within the United Kingdom, from legislation.gov.uk.

The Infant Life (Preservation) Act 1929 (19 & 20 Geo. 5. c. 34) is an act of the Parliament of the United Kingdom that created the offence of child destruction. The act retains three sections, the most substantive legal changes of which are in the first section.

The bill preceding it was introduced as the Child Destruction Bill. It was reintroduced in the next session as the Preservation of Infant Life Bill.

Section 1(1)'s caveat of the act amended section 58 of the Offences against the Person Act 1861 (24 & 25 Vict. c. 100) so that abortions and child destruction carried out in good faith for the sole purpose of preserving the life of the mother were no longer an offence.

== Relationship with the Abortion Act 1967 ==
The Abortion Act 1967 makes foetal abortion legal in specific circumstances when conducted in accordance with the regulations of the act.

The 1967 act—as for added clarity amended by s37 of the Human Fertilisation and Embryology Act 1990—explicitly notes that abortions performed under the terms of the 1967 act are not offences under the 1929 act.

No offence under the Infant Life (Preservation) Act 1929 shall be committed by a registered medical practitioner who terminates a pregnancy in accordance with the provisions of this Act [the Abortion Act].

== Subsequent developments ==
Section 2(1) of the act was repealed by section 10(2) of, and part II of schedule 3 to, the Criminal Law Act 1967, which came into force on 1 January 1968.
