= Hinduism and abortion =

Abortion in Hinduism, while generally considered reprehensible by traditional Hindu scriptures and the guiding precept of non-injury, can be interpreted equivocally within the vast spectrum of Hindu beliefs and texts and ultimately depends on individual context. The Mahanarayana Upanishad lists abortion with actions such as breaking one's vow of chastity. Some Hindu scriptures assert that "abortion is a worse sin than killing one's parents" and another text says that "a woman who aborts her child will lose her status". In general, Hinduism teaches the guiding principle of Ahimsa, abstention from causing harm or injury to all living beings, which serves as the root of the ethic of non-violence. However, in the modern context, individual decision-making may be guided by this precept of least harm as it relates to fetus, parents, and society.

Hindu texts such as the Mahabharata, the Bhagavad Gita and the Ramayana, as well as scholars disagree about what the principles of Ahimsa dictate when one is faced with situations that require self-defense or self-study. The precept of "non-injury" or ahimsa has evolved in its meaning throughout the history of Hindu ideology and literature. For example, some Hindu texts, such as the Rigveda or later the Sushruta Samhita, allow meat consumption while late Vedic texts condemn all killing.

== Interpretations based on Hindu texts ==
=== The concept of the soul ===
According to an article on 1 September 1985, on the Hinduism Today website, "Several Hindu institutions have shared their positions on abortion recently. The Brahma Kumaris World Spiritual University does not take a formal unchanging political or religious stance on the issue of abortion. According to Vedic literature an eternal individual soul inhabits the body of every living creature...The soul enters the womb at the time of conception, and this makes the fetus a living, individual person." The Bhagavad Gita states that the soul is neither born, nor does it die. The Bhagavata Purana goes further to state that Jīva (soul) is eternal and as such is unrelated to his body, not subject to decay or change and thus dispassionate. Some Hindu theologians believe personhood begins at 3 months and develops through to 5 months of gestation, possibly implying that abortion up to the third month does not harm a body with a soul, while considering any abortion past the third month to be destruction of the soul's current incarnate body.

=== Discourse in texts and by religious leaders ===
Some Hindu texts make clear distinctions in their sacred texts between abortions and miscarriages [ref?]. The text goes as far as stating that killing a male embryo who could have been a Brahmin is the same as killing an adult Brahmin which is considered one of the worst sins one can commit. This, again, reiterates the importance of producing offspring that serve a particular caste-based role, which may be of dubious concern in modern society.

== Popular beliefs among Hindus ==
Even with a high rate of abortion in India, a study in 1996 showed 80% of Indian women (which did not separate by religious identification) disapproved and 56% considered it a heinous crime. One of the social reasons for a massive number of abortions in India most likely includes the gender of the fetus. The 2011 census showed 7.1 million fewer girls than boys aged younger than seven, which showed an increase compared to the 6 million in 2001 and 4.2 million in 1991.

In the United States, the discourse surrounding the legality and morality of abortion is in large part framed by Christian groups. In the United States, 68% of Hindus surveyed believe abortion should be legal in all/most cases while 29% believe abortion should be illegal in all/most cases.

== Amount of suffering ==
A BBC Religions article from 2009 cites Lipner's "Hindu Ethics: Purity, Abortion, and Euthanasia" (1989) and states that if the mother's life is at risk, Hinduism permits abortion. The general value system of Hinduism teaches that the correct course of action in any given situation is the one that causes the least harm to those involved. Thus in the case where the mother's life is at risk, abortion is considered acceptable. The BBC article also states that the guiding principle of least harm includes least harm to "mother and father, the foetus and society". Whether maternal choice falls within the scope of least harm to mother, society, and duty can only be interpreted within an individual's context.
