= Northern Ireland (Executive Formation etc) Act 2019 =

Act of Parliament of the United Kingdom

- Act of Parliament
- Parliament of the United Kingdom
- Long title: An Act to extend the period for forming an Executive under section 1(1) of the Northern Ireland (Executive Formation and Exercise of Functions) Act 2018 and to impose a duty on the Secretary of State to report on progress towards the formation of an Executive in Northern Ireland and other matters; to impose duties to make regulations changing the law of Northern Ireland on certain matters, subject to the formation of an Executive; and for connected purposes.
- Citation: 2019 c. 22
- Introduced by: Karen Bradley (Commons); Lord Duncan of Springbank (Lords)
- Territorial extent: United Kingdom

Dates
- Royal assent: 24 July 2019
- Commencement: Between 22 October 2019 and 31 March 2020
Other legislation
Amends	Offences Against the Person Act 1861; Northern Ireland (Executive Formation and Exercise of Functions) Act 2018
Relates to	Abortion Act 1967; Northern Ireland Act 1974; Northern Ireland Act 1998; Civil Partnership Act 2004; Marriage (Same Sex Couples) Act 2013

Status: Current legislation

History of passage through Parliament

Text of statute as originally enacted

Revised text of statute as amended

The Northern Ireland (Executive Formation etc) Act 2019 (c. 22), colloquially known as the 2019 Northern Ireland Act, is an Act of the Parliament of the United Kingdom that provided for the extension of the period for forming a Northern Ireland executive until 13 January 2020. The Act also extended the powers of the Secretary of State for Northern Ireland during this time whilst imposing several conditions. The Act requires that the Secretary of State report regularly to Parliament, designed to limit the ability of the sovereign to prorogue parliament, as well as providing for the legalisation of same-sex marriage and opposite-sex civil partnership in Northern Ireland (in line with the rest of the UK) and the liberalisation of abortion laws (in line with abortion rights in England and Wales) if no executive was formed by midnight on 21 October 2019. After the deadline passed, abortion was decriminalised automatically by repeal of Sections 58 and 59 of the Offences Against the Person Act 1861; in December 2019 the British Government passed regulations legalising same-sex marriage and opposite-sex civil partnerships on 13 January 2020. Further regulations governing abortion came into force on 31 March 2020.

== Background ==
=== Renewable Heat Incentive scandal ===
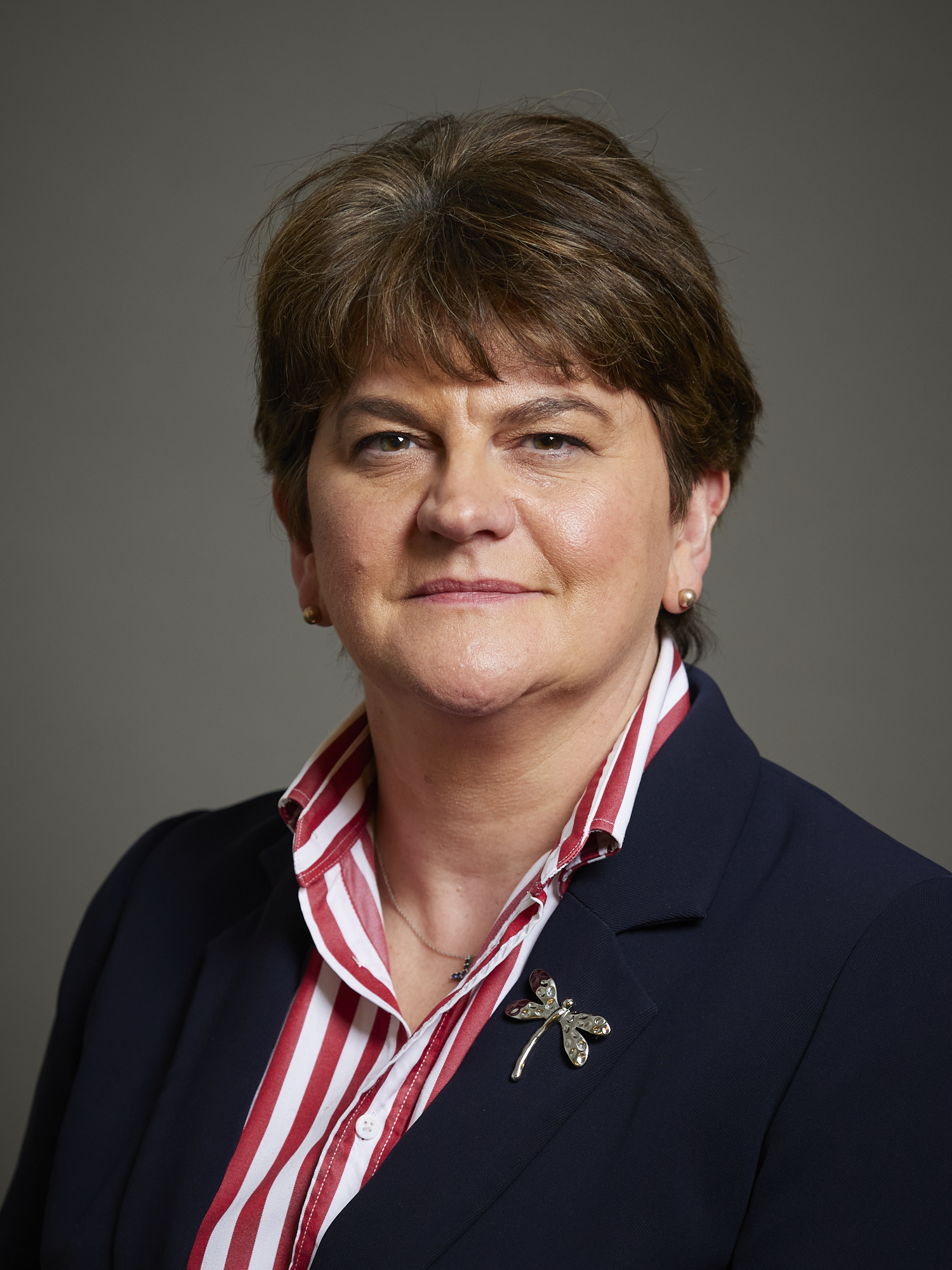
Arlene Foster, leader of the Democratic Unionist Party and First Minister

The Renewable Heat Incentive (RHI) scandal related to the cost of a renewable energy scheme initiated by Arlene Foster during her tenure as Minister for Enterprise, Trade and Investment. The scandal came to light in November 2016, when Foster was First Minister of Northern Ireland. Foster refused to stand aside during the enquiry, ultimately leading to the resignation of Martin McGuinness, deputy First Minister, which, under the Northern Ireland power-sharing agreement, led to the collapse of the Northern Ireland executive in January 2017.

=== Collapse of the Northern Ireland Executive ===
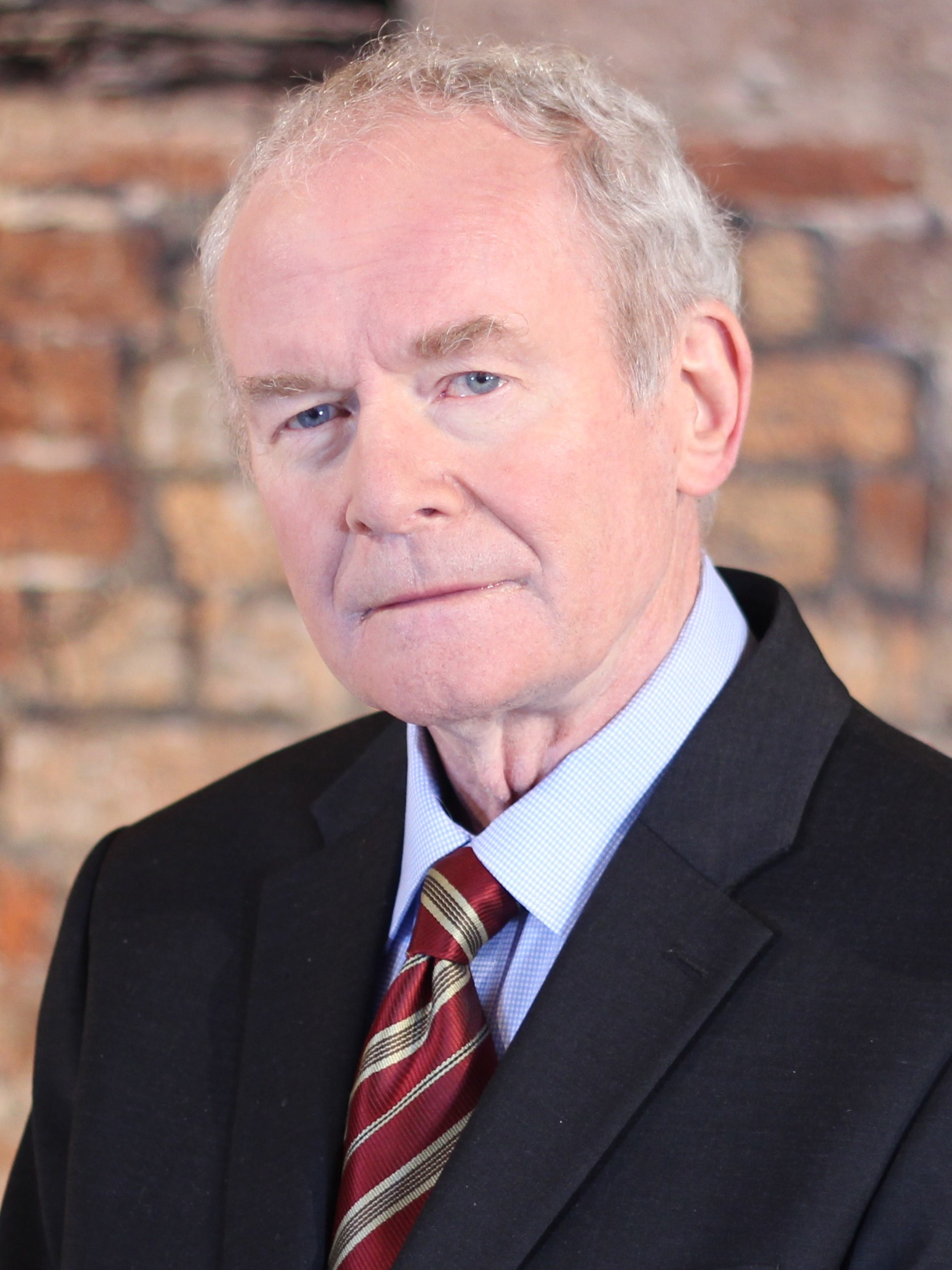
Martin McGuinness, former Northern Ireland leader of Sinn Féin and deputy First Minister.

Following the collapse of the Northern Ireland executive, snap elections were held. These elections were the first in the history of Northern Ireland where unionist parties did not win a majority: this was attributed to the RHI scandal, the role of the DUP in Brexit, and demographic shifts. Under the Northern Ireland Act 1998 a further election must be held within six weeks if no executive is formed. Following the elections, talks were held and facilitated by the British and Irish Governments in order to restore the devolved administration in Northern Ireland. During this time there were two Secretaries of State for Northern Ireland: James Brokenshire and Karen Bradley, who all failed to restore the executive. In order to prevent further re-elections the British Parliament passed the Northern Ireland (Ministerial Appointments and Regional Rates) Act 2017 and Northern Ireland (Executive Formation and Exercise of Functions) Act 2018 which provided for further extensions to the deadline set in the 1998 Act, as well legislating for devolved issues such as taxation. Following the 2018 Act, the 2019 bill was introduced to parliament to extend the deadline further. Secretary of State Julian Smith eventually restored the Executive in January 2020 under the terms of the New Decade, New Approach agreement.

=== Brexit and prorogation ===
Following the resignation of Theresa May as Leader of the Conservative Party, pro-Remain and moderate pro-Leave MPs were concerned that the frontrunner to replace her, Boris Johnson may consider proroguing parliament in order to force a no-deal Brexit. As this legislation was in the House during this time, Dominic Grieve and others saw it as having potential to act as a vehicle through which they could limit the right of the executive, Queen Elizabeth II, to order prorogation. The effect of Brexit on the Irish border and the slow progress of talks to restore the Northern Ireland executive both served as reasons for amending the bill to provide for reports to parliament.

=== LGBTQ rights in Northern Ireland ===
In Northern Ireland, LGBTQ rights lagged behind the rest of the United Kingdom, due to the petition of concern motion available to the socially-conservative and evangelical Democratic Unionist Party. As a result, same-sex marriages were not performed or recognised by the government in Northern Ireland and there remained gaps in legal protection for transgender individuals. However, with no Northern Ireland executive available to legislate on the issue, direct rule was used as an instrument in order to equalise protection and recognition for LGBTQ individual across the union. Amnesty International and other organisations, including the Labour Party considered this to be an important issue to legislate on in Westminster; others, such as the Conservative Party believed it to be an issue for the people and assembly of Northern Ireland.

=== Abortion rights in Northern Ireland ===
Abortion was only legal in Northern Ireland if "there is a risk of real and serious adverse effect on her physical or mental health, which is either long term or permanent", a status achieved through a series of British court cases during the period of direct rule from Westminster, where previously all cases of abortion were illegal. This differed from the rest of the UK as the Abortion Act 1967 did not apply to Northern Ireland, thus the Offences Against the Person Act 1861 retained its provisions against infanticide including nearly all cases of abortion. The Northern Ireland Assembly was unable to legislate on the issue effectively, again due to the petition of concern available to the Democratic Unionist Party.

== Content ==
=== List of provisions ===
The Act makes several provisions within it:

- Extended the deadline for the formation of the Northern Ireland Executive until 21 October 2019;
- Allowed the Secretary of State to further extend the deadline until 13 January 2020;
- Required the Secretary of State to report to parliament on or before 4 September 2019, on 9 October 2019, and then fortnightly until 18 December 2019;
- Required the Secretary of State to make regulations to legalise same-sex marriage and opposite-sex civil partnership, providing no executive was formed by 21 October 2019;
- Required the Secretary of State to make regulation to liberalise abortion law, providing no executive was formed by 21 October 2019;
- Required the Secretary of State to make regulation to provide for a compensation scheme for victims of the Troubles;
- Required that the government provided reports to parliament on a number of issues facing Northern Ireland, and allow time for them to be debated in the Chamber within 5 calendar days of the release of the report, as below:
  - With the report(s) from the Secretary of State:
    - Transparency of political donations;
    - Higher education in Northern Ireland;
    - Armed Forces-related incidents associated with the Troubles;
    - Prosecution guidance for Troubles-related incidences;
    - Abortion in Northern Ireland;
    - Gambling addiction in Northern Ireland;
  - On or before the 21 October 2019, providing no executive was formed:
    - Human trafficking;
    - Pensions for victims of the Troubles;
    - Historical institutional abuse;
    - Renewable Heat Incentive hardship fund;
    - Libel legislation in Northern Ireland;
    - Elective care services in Northern Ireland.

=== Extension period ===
The bill was introduced to allow for a de facto extension period until 13 January 2020. This allowed for negotiations involving Sinn Féin and the DUP, alongside the British and Irish Governments. Without the agreement of both the largest parties of each of Northern Ireland's communities, no executive could be formed.

=== Reports to Parliament ===
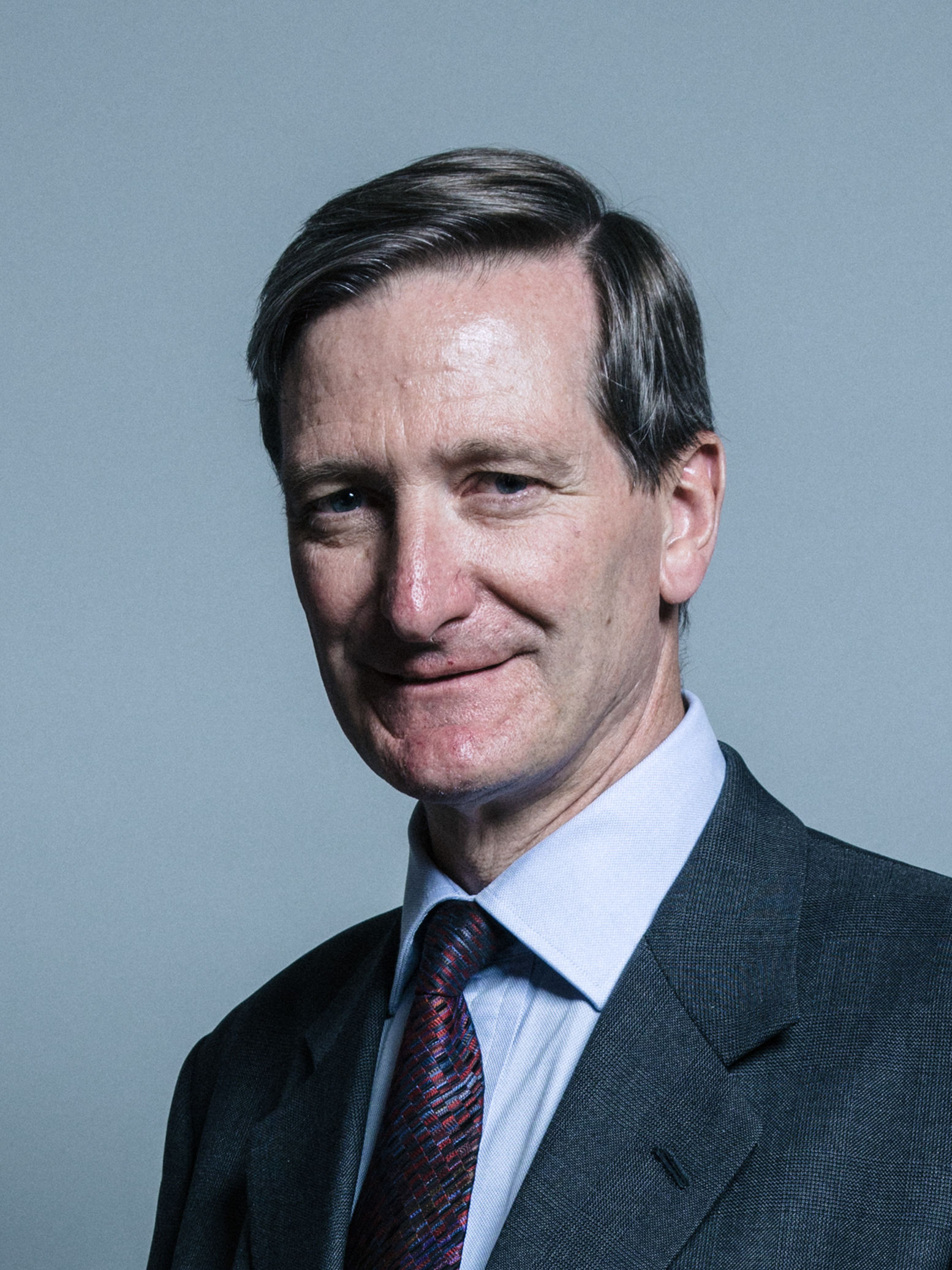
Dominic Grieve, whose amendment to the bill added the provisions designed to prevent the prorogation of parliament.

The reports to parliament provided for by the Act were introduced as part of an amendment by Dominic Grieve. The aim of the amendment was to make it functionally impossible to prorogue parliament, but as a royal prerogative power, it is constitutionally difficult to do so de jure. By requiring reports to be made to parliament, and requiring time to debate them within five calendar days, it prevented the monarch from proroguing parliament as parliament needs to be sitting to debate. However, the principle of parliamentary sovereignty in this regard had yet to be tested in British or Commonwealth courts, and it was unclear as to whether this could be fulfilled by written report, so not requiring parliament to be sitting in order for MPs to receive the reports. Critics claimed that these amendments were only tenuously linked to the purpose of the bill and therefore not appropriate, as their true function was not linked to the governing of Northern Ireland, but instead was designed to prevent a future Johnson ministry from proroguing parliament to force through a new negotiated deal or a no-deal Brexit. On 28 August 2019, Boris Johnson advised the Queen to prorogue parliament between 12 September and 14 October 2019, thereby spurring a number of court cases, with many of the objections centred around this provision within the Act. However, as 14 October was within 5 calendar days of 9 October, when the report was due, it was unclear if this provision could halt the prorogation, even if it were legally sufficient to do so. In the R (Miller) v The Prime Minister and Cherry v Advocate General for Scotland cases, the Supreme Court ruled the prorogation illegal, but not based on these provisions of the Act.

=== Same-sex marriage and abortion ===
Map showing how each MP voted on the Second Reading of the Amendment providing for same-sex marriage. LAB/LIB/SNP/TIG/PC/GRN votes: Aye Conservative votes: Aye Conservative/DUP votes: No Absent Vacant seat

Further amendments provided for same-sex marriage and liberalisation of abortion laws. This brought Northern Ireland into line with the rest of the UK on both social issues, overruling the strongly unionist DUP's historic opposition to LGBTQ and women's rights, due to their strong links to the Free Presbyterian Church of Ulster. This came into force since no executive was formed by 21 October 2019 and could be overruled by a future Northern Ireland Assembly. The DUP described these additions as "undermining" devolution, whilst the Irish republican Sinn Féin welcomed the move.

As no executive was formed before 21 October 2019, these provisions required that the Secretary of State introduce legislation to extend the provisions of the Marriage (Same Sex Couples) Act 2013 to Northern Ireland before 13 January 2020, and to implement the recommendations of the CEDAW's report on the UK before 31 March 2020, with abortion automatically decriminalised on 21 October 2019. The appropriate regulations were introduced and the first same-sex marriage in Northern Ireland took place on 11 February 2020 in Carrickfergus, County Antrim. The Northern Ireland Department of Health issued a statement outlining its intent to produce medical guidance to bring NHS abortion services in line with those provided in the rest of the United Kingdom on 1 April 2020.

== Litigation ==
The Act has formed part of the basis for two of several court cases around the attempted prorogation of Parliament by Boris Johnson: R (Miller) v The Prime Minister and Cherry v Advocate General for Scotland. The Supreme Court ruled that the prorogation was illegal, voiding its effect, but it did not do so based on the contents of this Act.

In the Court of Appeal in Northern Ireland, anonymous litigators have appealed against a High Court verdict which ruled that the lack of same-sex marriage did not amount to a breach of the European Convention on Human Rights. This judgment was reserved after it was heard on 16 March 2018.

On 3 October 2019, the High Court in Belfast ruled that former abortion legislation in Northern Ireland was incompatible with human rights legislation. However, in light of the impending enactment of the relevant provisions of this Act, the judge, Mrs. Justice Keegan, did not issue a formal declaration of incompatibility.

== See also ==
- History of Northern Ireland
- 2017 Northern Ireland Assembly election
- 2019 in Northern Ireland
