= Princess Elizabeth Hospital =

- States of Guernsey

Geography
- Location: Rue Mignot, Saint Martin, Guernsey
- Coordinates: 49.4476°N 2.5582°W

Services
- Emergency department: Yes
- Beds: 104

History
- Opened: 23 June 1949

Links
- Website: www.gov.gg/peh

Princess Elizabeth Hospital (PEH) is a hospital in the parish of Saint Martin in Guernsey. It is the only acute hospital in Guernsey.

== History ==
The hospital was opened by the then Princess Elizabeth on 23 June 1949. It proceeded from previous hospitals on Guernsey including Victoria Cottage Hospital, Guernsey, which closed in 1940 during German Occupation.

== Facilities ==
The hospital is made up of 12 wards and has 104 beds.
