= Criminal Justice Act (Northern Ireland) 1945 =

Act of the Parliament of Northern Ireland

Criminal Justice Act (Northern Ireland) 1945 (Note: Section 47(1).)
- Act of Parliament
- Parliament of Northern Ireland
- Long title: An Act to amend the law with respect to the administration of criminal justice and for certain purposes connected therewith.
- Citation: 1945 c. 15 (N.I.)
- Territorial extent: Northern Ireland

Dates
- Royal assent: 13 December 1945
Other legislation
Amended by	Northern Ireland (Emergency Provisions) Act 1973; Judicature (Northern Ireland) Act 1978; Statute Law Revision (Northern Ireland) Act 1980; Forgery and Counterfeiting Act 1981; Crime and Disorder Act 1998

Status: Amended

Revised text of statute as amended

The Criminal Justice Act (Northern Ireland) 1945 (c. 15 (N.I.)) is an act of the Parliament of Northern Ireland.

== Provisions ==
Section 25 of the act creates the offence of child destruction, which states:

[A]ny person who, with intent to destroy the life of a child then capable of being born alive, by any wilful act causes a child to die before it has an existence independent of its mother, shall be guilty of felony, to wit, of child destruction...

This section provides a defence of acting in good faith to preserve the life of the mother. The offence supplemented the offence of abortion (under the Offences against the Person Act 1861), which deals with unborn children not capable of being born alive. The Offences against the Person Act 1861 was repealed for Northern Ireland in October 2019.

Other provisions of the act deal with miscellaneous criminal procedure, search warrants pertaining to brothels, marital coercion, and a prohibition on the taking of photographs in court.
