= Abortion Act 1967 =

Act of the Parliament of the United Kingdom

Abortion Act 1967 (Note: Section 7(1).)
- Act of Parliament
- Parliament of the United Kingdom
- Long title: An Act to amend and clarify the Law relating to termination of pregnancy by registered medical practitioners.
- Citation: 1967 c. 87
- Introduced by: David Steel (Commons)
- Territorial extent: England and Wales; Scotland; (Note: Section 7(3).)

Dates
- Royal assent: 27 October 1967
- Commencement: 27 April 1968 (Note: Section 7(2).)
Other legislation
Amended by	Transfer of Functions (Wales) Order 1969; Criminal Procedure (Scotland) Act 1975; Health Services Act 1980; Criminal Justice Act 1982; Transfer of Functions (Health and Social Security) Order 1988; National Health Service and Community Care Act 1990; Human Fertilisation and Embryology Act 1990; Scotland Act 1998 (Consequential Modifications) (No.1) Order 1999; Health and Social Care (Community Health and Standards) Act 2003; National Health Service (Consequential Provisions) Act 2006; Health and Social Care Act 2012; Secretaries of State for Health and Social Care and for Housing, Communities and Local Government and Transfer of Functions (Commonhold Land) Order 2018; Health and Care Act 2022
Relates to	Infant Life (Preservation) Act 1929

Status: Amended

Text of statute as originally enacted

Revised text of statute as amended

Text of the Abortion Act 1967 as in force today (including any amendments) within the United Kingdom, from legislation.gov.uk.

The Abortion Act 1967 (c. 87) is an act of the Parliament of the United Kingdom that legalised abortion in Great Britain on certain grounds by registered practitioners, and regulated the tax-paid provision of such medical practices through the National Health Service (NHS).

The act made it lawful to have an abortion up to the 28th week if two registered medical practitioners believed in good faith that the continuance of the pregnancy would involve risk to the life of the pregnant woman, or harm her physical or mental health, or that of any of her family members. It did not extend to Northern Ireland until the implementation of the Abortion (Northern Ireland) Regulations 2020. Under this legislation, a registered medical professional could terminate a pregnancy where the pregnancy had not exceeded 12 weeks in length, there was a risk to physical or mental health within 24 weeks of pregnancy, or, at any time during pregnancy, where the pregnant woman's life was at immediate risk, there was a risk to the pregnant mother's physical or mental health, or a severe or fatal fetal abnormality had been detected. In the latter two cases, the good faith opinion of two registered medical professionals is required.

== Passage ==
The bill was introduced by Liberal MP David Steel as a Private Member's Bill after he did well in the ballot for such bills in 1966, coming third. There had been six earlier attempts to change the law on abortion, starting with an earlier Private Member's Bill from the Labour MP Joseph Reeves in 1952. Labour peer Lewis Silkin had introduced legislation in 1965, but withdrew this once Steel had successfully introduced his motion to the Commons, with Steel's bill being based on Silkin's text. There had been a long-running campaign supporting the legalisation of abortion in the UK, led by the Abortion Law Reform Association, who had lobbied Steel to use his Private Member's Bill slot on the topic.

The proposal was backed by the Labour government, who appointed the president of the Royal College of Obstetricians and Gynaecologists, Sir John Peel, to chair a medical advisory committee that reported in favour of passing the bill. Several members of the government were sympathetic to legalisation, including Roy Jenkins (Home Secretary), Kenneth Robinson (Minister of Health), Richard Crossman (Leader of the House), and John Silkin (Government Chief Whip).

After a further heated political and moral debate, the House of Commons passed it by a vote of 167 to 83 on 13 July 1967. The House of Lords granted it a second reading by a vote of 127 to 21 on 19 July, and approved it with minor changes on 23 October. On 25 October, the Commons voted 188–94 to agree with the amendments made by the Lords. The bill was enacted two days later, and came into force on 27 April 1968.

== Later laws ==
Since 1967, members of Parliament have introduced a number of private member's bills to change the abortion law. Five resulted in substantive debate (1975, 1976, 1979, 1988, and 1990), but all failed. The Lane Committee investigated the workings of the Act in 1974 and declared its support.

=== Human Fertilisation and Embryology Act 1990 ===
Changes to the Abortion Act 1967 were introduced in Parliament through the Human Fertilisation and Embryology Act 1990. The time limits were lowered from 28 to 24 weeks for most cases on the grounds that medical technology had advanced sufficiently to justify the change. Restrictions were removed for late abortions in cases of risk to life, fetal abnormality, or grave physical and mental injury to the woman. Some Members of Parliament claimed not to have been aware of the vast change the decoupling of the Infant Life Preservation Act 1929 would have on the Abortion Act 1967, particularly in relation to the unborn disabled child.

Politicians from the unionist and nationalist parties in Northern Ireland joined forces on 20 June 2000 to block any extension of the Abortion Act 1967 to Northern Ireland where terminations were only allowed on a restricted basis.

=== Human Fertilisation and Embryology Act 2008 ===
There was widespread action across the country to oppose any attempts to restrict abortion access via the Human Fertilisation and Embryology Bill (now Act) in Parliament (Report Stage and Third Reading 22 October 2008). MPs voted to retain the current legal limit of 24 weeks. Amendments proposing reductions to 22 weeks and 20 weeks were defeated by 304 to 233 votes and 332 to 190 votes respectively.

A number of abortion rights amendments were proposed by Diane Abbott MP, Katy Clark MP and John McDonnell MP - including NC30 Amendment of the Abortion Act 1967: Application to Northern Ireland. However, it was reported that the Labour Government at the time asked MPs not to table these amendments (and at least until Third Reading) and then allegedly used parliamentary mechanisms in order to prevent a vote. Harriet Harman, in particular, was reported to have blocked the series of votes to liberalise Britain's abortion laws.

==== 50th anniversary of the Abortion Act 1967 ====
In May 2017, the Labour Party under Jeremy Corbyn's leadership made a commitment to extend the Abortion Act 1967 to Northern Ireland. In June 2017, the UK Government revealed plans to provide some type of free abortion services in England for women from Northern Ireland in an attempt to head off a Conservative rebellion in a vote on the Queen's speech.

=== Northern Ireland (Executive Formation etc) Act 2019 ===
The Northern Ireland (Executive Formation etc) Act 2019, enacted on 24 July 2019, extended the deadline for the restoration of the Executive to 21 October 2019. Section 9 of the act provided that, if an Executive were not restored by that date:

- the Secretary of State for Northern Ireland would be required to implement recommendations regarding abortion made in the CEDAW report; and
- sections 58 and 59 of the Offences Against the Person Act 1861 (under which abortion was illegal) would be repealed insofar as they applied to Northern Ireland.

On 21 October 2019, as a result of the Executive not being restored, sections 58 and 59 of the 1861 act were repealed, decriminalising abortion in Northern Ireland.

== See also ==
- Abortion in the United Kingdom
