= Charles Adamson =

Charles Adamson is the name of:

- Charles Adamson (sculptor) (1880–1959), Scottish-Canadian sculptor
- Charles Lodge Adamson (1906–1979), English cricketer
- Chuck Adamson (ice hockey) (born 1938), ice hockey goaltender
- Charlie Adamson (1875–1918), English rugby union player
- Chuck Adamson (1936–2008), police officer turned screenwriter

== See also ==
- Adamson (surname)
