= St Mary's Church, Rickinghall Superior =

Coordinates: 52.3314°N 0.9939°E

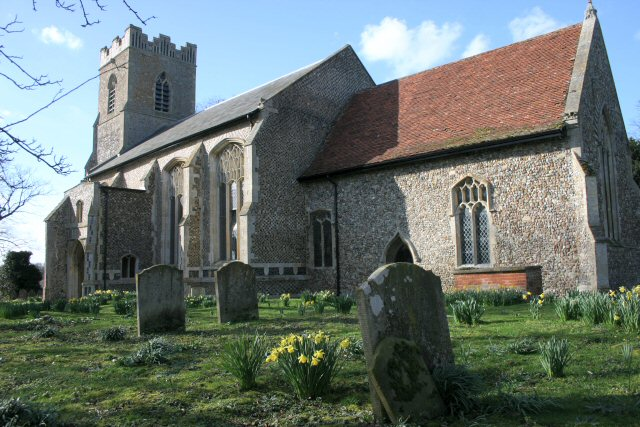
- St Mary's Church, Rickinghall Superior, from the southeast

- Location in Suffolk
- OS grid reference: TM 041 746
- Location: Rickinghall Superior, Suffolk
- Country: England
- Denomination: Anglican
- Website: Churches Conservation Trust

Architecture
- Functional status: Redundant
- Heritage designation: Grade 1
- Designated: 29 July 1955
- Architect: W. M. Fawcett (restoration)
- Architectural type: Church
- Style: Gothic

Specifications
- Materials: Flint with ashlar and brick dressings Nave roof slated chancel roof tiled

St Mary's Church is a redundant Anglican church in the civil parish of Rickinghall Superior, in the village of Rickinghall, Suffolk, England. It is recorded in the National Heritage List for England as a designated Grade I listed building, and is under the care of the Churches Conservation Trust. There are two churches serving the village of Rickinghall, both dedicated to St Mary, the other being an active parish church in the centre of the village in the parish of Rickinghall Inferior. St Mary's Church, Rickinghall Superior, stands to the south of the village, on the other side of the A143 road.

== History ==
The church dates from the 14th century. In the middle of the following century the nave was rebuilt, and the south porch was altered. The church was "thoroughly restored" in 1868 by William Milner Fawcett.

== Architecture ==
=== Exterior ===
St Mary's is constructed in flint rubble with ashlar and brick dressings. The nave has a slate roof, and the roof of the chancel is tiled. Its plan consists of a wide four-bay nave without aisles, a narrower, lower and shorter chancel, a south porch and a west tower. The tower is in four stages with diagonal buttresses. On the west side, extending into both of the lower two stages, is a two-light arched window. In the third stage are quatrefoil openings on three of the sides. The top stage has two-light louvred bell openings on all sides. The parapet is embattled, with flushwork panels containing monograms and a variety of patterns. On the north and south sides are gargoyles. The nave stands on a decorated plinth, and contains four large three-light Perpendicular windows. The south porch is in two storeys. It has diagonal buttresses decorated with monograms. Above the entrance arch is a two-light window. In the east wall of the chancel is a three-light window dating from the 14th century; the north and south walls each contain two two-light 15th-century windows. Also on the south side is a low door.

=== Interior ===
In the chancel is a 15th-century piscina and a sedilia. There is another piscina in the southeast of the nave. The font is octagonal and dates from the 14th century. There is a timber bier dated 1763 in the nave. On the tower wall are a benefactions board and two peal boards. There are fragments of 15th-century stained glass in one of the nave windows, and in one of the chancel windows. The stained glass in the east window dated 1868 is by O'Connor, and that in one of the chancel windows and in the tower west window is by Heaton, Butler and Bayne, dating from about 1875. There is a ring of six bells. Three of these were cast in 1712 by John Goldsmith, one by Thomas Newman in 1741, one by John Taylor and Company in 1850, and the last by Alfred Bowell in 1911.

== External features ==
In the churchyard are five structures to the north of the church that have been designated as Grade II listed buildings. They are the chest tomb of H. Elmy who died in 1738, a pair of headstones, also to members of the Elmy family, who died in 1743 and 1748, the chest tomb of J. Parson who died in 1811, a group of nine headstones to members of the Mills family with dates in the late 17th and 18th centuries, and a memorial to J. Smith and his wife Susanna who died in 1810 and 1838 respectively.

== See also ==
- List of churches preserved by the Churches Conservation Trust in the East of England
