= Wyalusing =

Wyalusing may refer to:

United States

- Wyalusing, Pennsylvania, a borough in Bradford County
  - Wyalusing Township, Pennsylvania, in the above borough
- Wyalusing, Wisconsin, a town in Grant County
  - Wyalusing (community), Wisconsin, an unincorporated community in the above town

USS Wyalusing (1863), a United States Navy gunboat of the American Civil War, named for Wyalusing, Pennsylvania
