= Robert Glenn =

Robert Glenn may refer to:

- Robert Glenn (Wisconsin state senator) (1858–1915)
- Robert Glenn Sr. (1813–1887), member of the Wisconsin state assembly and father of the state senator
- Robert Broadnax Glenn (1854–1920), governor of North Carolina

== See also ==
- Robert Glen (1875–1953), Scottish footballer
