= Kimberley, Norfolk =

Village in Norfolk, England

Coordinates: 52.595909°N 1.057301°E

Kimberley
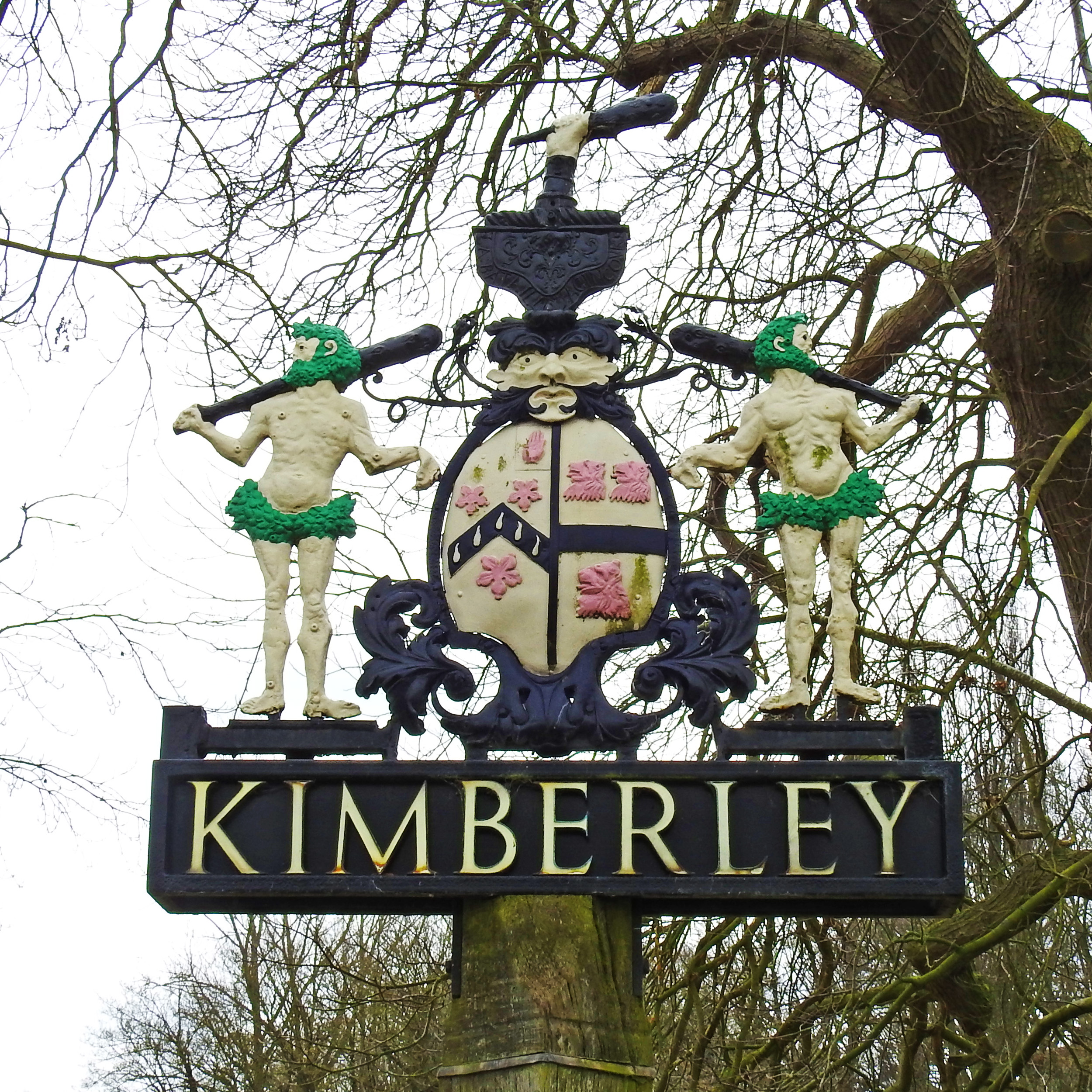
- Kimberley Village Sign

- Location within Norfolk
- OS grid reference: TG071041
- Civil parish: Kimberley and Carleton Forehoe
- District: South Norfolk
- Shire county: Norfolk
- Region: East
- Country: England
- Sovereign state: United Kingdom
- Post town: WYMONDHAM
- Postcode district: NR18
- Dialling code: 01362
- Police: Norfolk
- Fire: Norfolk
- Ambulance: East of England
- UK Parliament: Mid Norfolk

Kimberley is a village and former civil parish, now in the parish of Kimberley and Carleton Forehoe in the South Norfolk district, in the English county of Norfolk.

Kimberly is located 3 miles (4.8 km) north-west of Wymondham and 10 miles (16 km) west of Norwich.

== History ==
Kimberley's name is of Anglo-Saxon origin and derives from the Old English for Cyneburg's wood clearing.

In the Domesday Book, Kimberley is listed as a settlement of 31 households in the hundred of Forehoe. In 1086, the village was part of the East Anglian estates of King William I.

Kimberley Hall was built in the late Sixteenth Century as the residence of the Wodehouse family who had strong links to Kimberley. The gardens of the hall were sculpted by Capability Brown.

Kimberley Park Railway Station opened in 1847 on the Norfolk Railway between Wymondham and Dereham. The station closed in 1969 but re-opened in 2004 as a stop on the Mid-Norfolk Railway.

== Geography ==
The River Tiffey flows through the village. As do both the B1108, between Carbrooke and Ipswich, and the B1135, between Toftwood and Bracon Ash.

== St. Peter's Church ==
Kimberley's former parish church is dedicated to Saint Peter and dates from the Fifteenth Century. St. Peter's is located on 'The Green' and has been Grade II listed since 1959. The church is open for Sunday service once a month and is part of the Upper Yare Benefice.

St. Peter's holds a stained-glass window depicting Saint Frances, Saint Patrick and Saint Bridget of Ireland which was designed by Clayton and Bell as well as various memorial windows to members of the Wodehouse family.

== Notable residents ==
- Roger Woodhouse MP (1541–1588), politician, born in Kimberley
- Sir Thomas Wodehouse, 2nd Baronet (1585–1658), politician, born in Kimberley
- John Jenkins (1592–1678), composer, lived and died in Kimberley
- Sir Philip Wodehouse, 1st Baronet (died 1623), soldier and politician, born in Kimberley
- Alice Sutcliffe (died 1634), religious writer, born in Kimberley
- Sir John Wodehouse, 4th Baronet (1669–1754), politician, born in Kimberley
- William Wodehouse (1706–1737), politician, born in Kimberley
- Henry Wodehouse (1799–1834), MCC cricketer, born in Kimberley
- Ernest Raikes OBE (1863–1931), Norfolk cricketer and legal advocate, born in Kimberley
- James Hambro (born 1949), banker and businessman, lives in Kimberley

== Governance ==
Kimberley is part of the electoral ward of Wicklewood for local elections and is part of the district of South Norfolk.

The village's national constituency is Mid Norfolk which has been represented by the Conservative George Freeman since 2010.

The parish absorbed the parish of Carleton Forehoe on 1 April 1935. In 1931 the parish of Kimberley (prior to the merge) had a population of 163.

== War memorial ==
Kimberley's war memorial is a wooden plaque in St. Peter's Church which lists the following names for the First World War:

Rank	Name	Unit	Date of death	Burial/Commemoration
2Lt.	Edward Wodehouse	16th The Queen's Lancers	30 Mar. 1918	Pozières Memorial
Pte.	Herbert J. Spinks	2nd Bn., Norfolk Regiment	8 Aug. 1916	North Gate War Cemetery
Pte.	Benjamin J. Spalding	9th Bn., Norfolk Regt.	21 Mar. 1918	Arras Memorial
Pte.	William Buckle	13th Bn., Suffolk Regiment	30 Apr. 1916	Greenwich Cemetery
