= Rickinghall Inferior =

Civil parish in Suffolk, England

Coordinates: 52.326°N 0.974°E

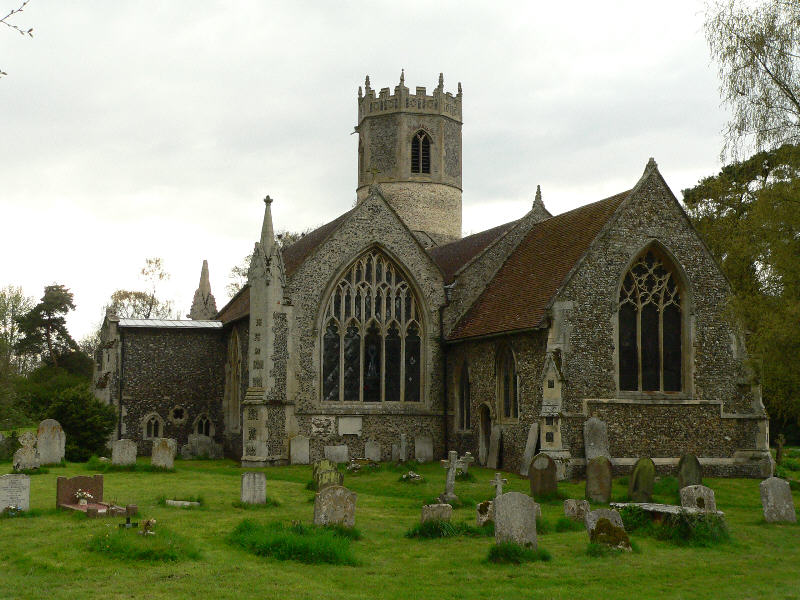
- St. Mary's Rickinghall Inferior

- Location within Suffolk
- Population: 449
- Civil parish: Rickinghall Inferior
- District: Mid Suffolk
- Shire county: Suffolk
- Region: East
- Country: England
- Sovereign state: United Kingdom
- Post town: Diss
- Postcode district: IP22
- Police: Suffolk
- Fire: Suffolk
- Ambulance: East of England
- UK Parliament: Waveney Valley

Rickinghall Inferior is a civil parish in the Mid Suffolk district of Suffolk, England. According to the 2011 census there were 233 males and 216 females in this civil parish, for a total population of 449. It includes the western part of the village of Rickinghall and is adjacent to the village and parish of Wattisfield. The old road from the market town of Bury. St Edmunds to the City of Norwich and the town of Great Yarmouth passes through the centre of the village but the new road, the A143, uses a by-pass to the East.

== History ==
The parishes name Rickinghall Inferior means "The nook of Rica's People". The term " Inferior" means lower and refers to the fact that the parish is the lower counterpart of Rickinghall Superior. The parish appears in 2 entries in the Little Domesday Book under the name "Richingehella" in the year 1086 the Domesday Book recorded "2 villagers. 7 smallholders. 2 slaves. 22 freemen. 2 free men." in the parish. The church appears in a series titled " A Series of Etchings Illustrative of the Architectural Antiquities of Suffolk", which is part of the British Museum's collection; it was acquired by the museum in 1870. However the work is not currently on display.

In 1868 The National Gazetteer of Great Britain and Ireland described the parish as

Rickinghall Inferior, a parish in the hundred of Blackbourn, county Suffolk, 7 miles S.W. of Diss, 5 W. of Mellis railway station, and a quarter of a mile S.W. of Botesdale, its post town. The village, which is of small extent, is wholly agricultural. The road from Bury St. Edmund's to Norwich runs through the village. The tithes of the two parishes, Inferior and Superior, have been commuted for a rent-charge of £1,040; and the glebe contains 24 acres. The living is a rectory* consolidated with that of Rickinghall-Superior, in the diocese of Norwich, joint value £850. The church, dedicated to St. Mary, is an ancient edifice with a circular tower, the upper part of which is octagonal. The parochial charities produce about £33 per annum. There is a National school. The Baptists and Wesleyans have each a place of worship. G. H. Wilson, Esq., is lord of the manor.

== Church ==
St. Mary's Rickinghall Inferior is one of the few dozen extant round-tower churches in Suffolk. According to the 1870–72 Imperial Gazetteer of England and Wales, the church is "early decorated English" in style. The church has a tower which is circular below and octagonal above. It is a Grade I listed building. The Church is home to panels of Flemish glass, most likely from the 18th century, which depict the disciples at the Last Supper. As part of the millennium the church was given a new stained glass window, an image of Christ the Saviour of the World. In 2013 a guide to the church called " St Mary's Church Rickinghall Inferior" written by former churchwarden Jean Sheehan was published. The book has been published by 'Quatrefoil' a village group funded by the National Lottery established to specifically publish books about the history of the villages of Botesdale, Redgrave and The Rickinghalls.

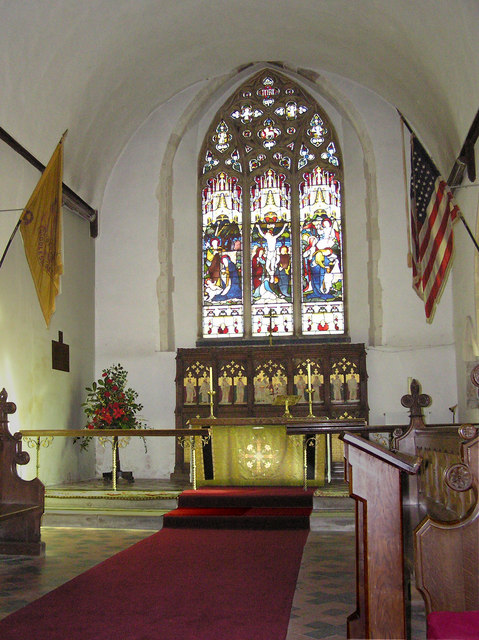
Interior of St. Mary's Rickinghall Inferior

Inside the church, there is a plaque commemorating excavator and archaeologist Basil Brown, who lived in nearby Rickinghall and who is best known for his discoveries at Sutton Hoo.

== Housing ==
The 1831 national census recorded 60 occupied dwellings in the civil parish of Rickinghall Inferior. By 1901 this had risen to 81 occupied dwellings and 4 vacant dwellings. In 1961 it had risen to 101 occupied dwellings. The 2011 national census recorded 195 dwellings. There are 90 detached households, 68 semi-detached households, 28 terraced households and 9 flats.

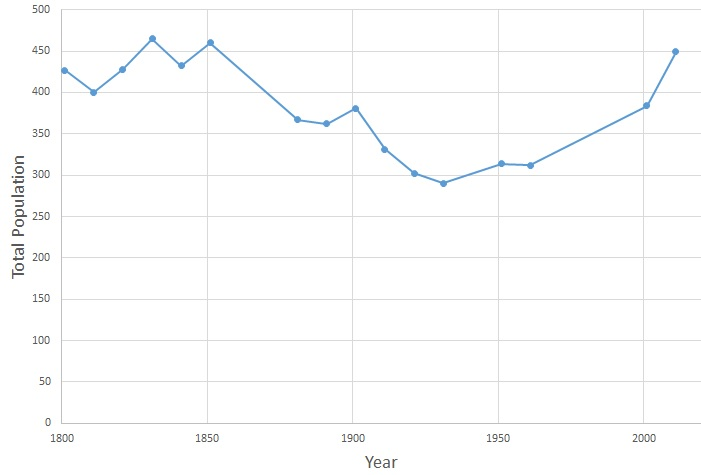
Population of Rickinghall Inferior 1801–2011

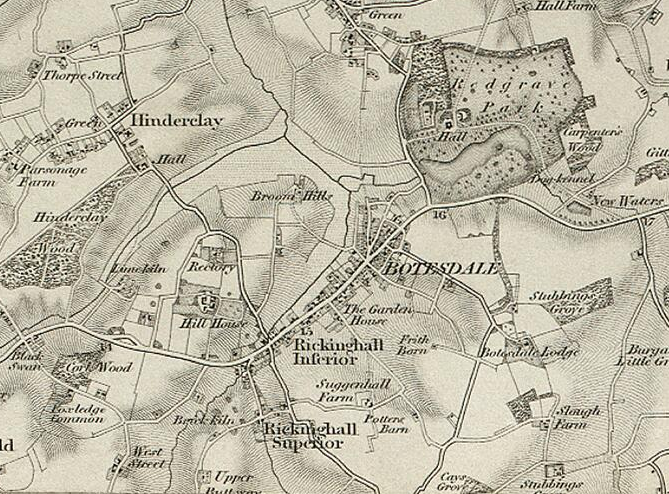
19th Century Map of Rickinghall Inferior

The 2011 national census, records that 108 households are deprived in some way, and 80 households are not deprived. English is the first language of 97.9% of households. 50 of the households are one person households.

== Demographics ==
The first national census of 1801 recorded a population of 427 within the parish. The population of the parish fluctuates over the 110-year period of census data reaching an all-time low in 1931 when it reached a low of 290. Overall the population has increased since 1801. In the 2011 national census the population had increased by 5%. The civil parish now has a population of 449 with 233 males and 216 females.

The population density of Rickinghall Inferior is 0.6 ( number of people per hectare).

The 2001 national census records show that the number of people born in England and that live in Rickinghall Inferior as 356 or 92% of the population. In the 2011 national census the recorded number of people born in England and that live in Rickinghall Inferior as 423 or 94.2% of the population. The ethnic backgrounds according to the 2001 national census records show that 374 people of Rickinghall Inferiors 383 person population identified as 'White British', with the rest of the population being made up of 3 people each in the 'Other White' category; ' Mixed White and Black (Caribbean)' and the 'Mixed White and Asian' category. By the 2011 census records show that 438 of the 449 population identified as ' White British'. with the rest of the population being made up of 5 people in the ' Other White' category; 4 people in the 'Mixed White and Black (Caribbean)' and 2 people that identified as ' Black Caribbean'.

== Industry ==
In 1831, occupations for males over the age of 20 were grouped by social status. This included 11 employers and professionals, 33 middling sorts, 63 Labourers and Servants and 12 that where classified as others. In the 1831 national census occupations where simplified into four occupational categories agriculture, manufacturing, retail and handicraft, and other. 75 worked in agriculture, 0 worked in manufacturing, 27 in retail and handicraft, and 17 in other. The other category covers capitalists, professionals, labourers outside agriculture and servants.

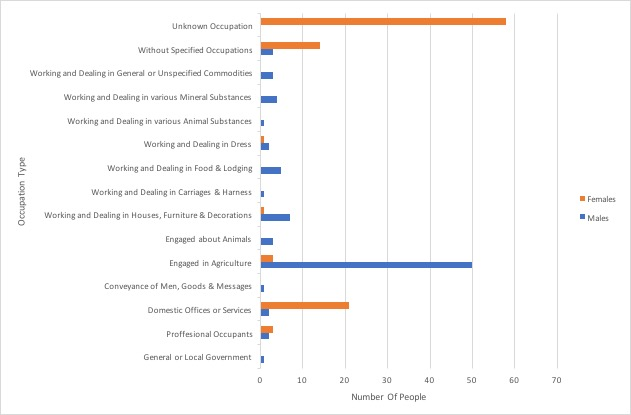
Rickinghall Inferior 1881 Occupation Census Data

The 1881 national census data records that agriculture as the most popular occupation in the parish of Rickinghall Inferior with 53 people working in agriculture. Domestic service or offices was the second most popular occupation with 23 people working in this industry. According to the census data there were a number of people without specified or unknown occupations 72 of whom were women.

The 2001 national census recorded that 165 people were in employment. Of that number 131 were in full-time employment and 34 people in part-time employment. However, this changed the 2011 census recorded that 200 people were in employment . With 138 people in full-time employment and 62 people who were in part-time employment.

Since the 1881 national census the most popular occupation has changed from agriculture to wholesale and retail trade; it is the occupation of 34 people. The second most popular occupation is construction; with 28 people working in the sector.

The 2011 census also recorded that the most popular method of travelling to work was driving in a car or van. For those who are not economically active; 15 are full-time students; 76 are retired; 8 look after home or family; 6 are long-time sick or disabled and 12 are unemployed.
