= Allwood =

Allwood is a surname. Notable people with the surname include:

- Jens Allwood (born 1947), linguist
- Matthew Allwood (born 1992), Australian rugby league player
- Ralph Allwood (born 1950), once head of music at Eton College, England
- Robert Allwood (1803–1891), English-born clergyman and academic in colonial Australia

== See also ==
- Allwood Green, an area of Suffolk, England
