= Westhall Wood and Meadow =

Protected area in Suffolk, England

Coordinates: 52.32°N 0.98°E

- Site of Special Scientific Interest
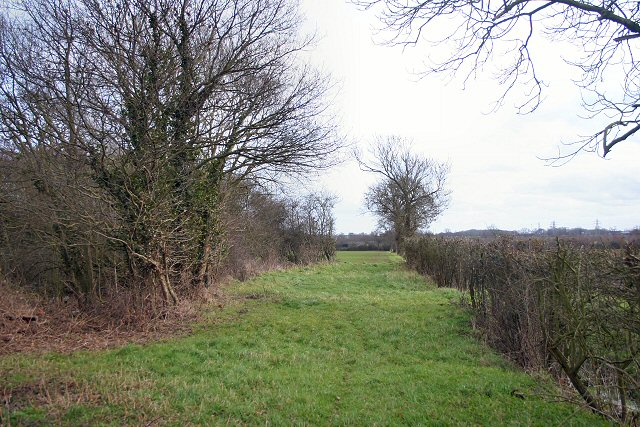
- Location of Westhall Wood and Meadow.
- Area of search: Suffolk
- Grid reference: TM 030 728
- Interest: Biological
- Area: 43.1 hectares
- Notification date: 1989
- Location map: Magic Map

Westhall Wood and Meadow is a 43.1-hectare (107-acre) biological Site of Special Scientific Interest south of Rickinghall in Suffolk.

The wood is ancient coppice with standards with mainly pedunculate oak and hornbeams dominant in the coppice layer. The unimproved meadow is poorly drained and species rich, with grasses including red fescue and Yorkshire fog.

The site is private land with no public access.
