= George Raikes =

English sportsman

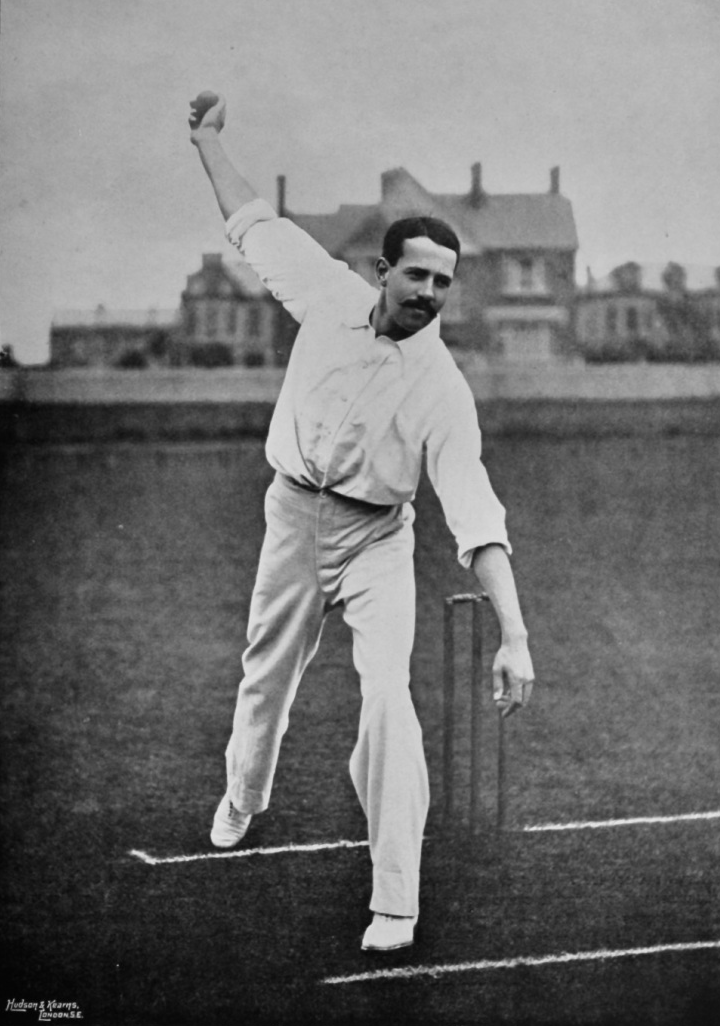
- Raikes in about 1895

Personal information
- Full name: George Barkley Raikes
- Born: 14 March 1873; Carleton Forehoe, Norfolk, England
- Died: 18 December 1966 (aged 93); Lamyatt, Somerset, England
- Nickname: Ginger Beer
- Height: 6 ft 2 in (1.88 m)
- Batting: Right-handed
- Bowling: Right-arm fast-medium; Leg break
- Relatives: Ernest Raikes (brother); Thomas Raikes (nephew)

Domestic team information
- Years: Team
- 1890–1897: Norfolk
- 1893–1896: Oxford University
- 1900–1902: Hampshire
- 1904–1913: Norfolk

Career statistics
Competition	First-class
Matches	30
Runs scored	816
Batting average	17.00
100s/50s	0/3
Top score	77
Balls bowled	3,418
Wickets	71
Bowling average	24.40
5 wickets in innings	2
10 wickets in match	0
Best bowling	6/62
Catches/stumpings	30/–
- Source: CricketArchive, 12 October 2025
Association football career
- Position: Goalkeeper
Senior career*
Years	Team	Apps	(Gls)
?	Wymondham Town	?	(?)
1893–1896	Oxford University	?	(?)
1893–1896	Corinthian	?	(?)
?	Casuals	?	(?)
International career
1895–1896	England	4	(0)
- * Club domestic league appearances and goals

George Barkley Raikes (14 March 1873 – 18 December 1966) was an English sportsman and clergyman. As a sportsman, he played first-class cricket for Oxford University and Hampshire, as well as playing association football at international level for the England national football team. His ecclesiastical career lasted from his ordination in 1897, to his retirement in 1936.

== Early life and education ==
Raikes was born at Carleton Forehoe near Wymondham in Norfolk, Raikes was the second son of Francis Raikes, a clergyman. He grew up at Hedenham Hall in south Norfolk and was educated at Shrewsbury School. At Shrewsbury, he played for and captained the school cricket team, in addition to keeping goal for the school football team between 1890 and 1892. Whilst still at school, he had begun playing for Norfolk, a second-class county, in 1890. As a schoolboy cricketer he began playing as a wicket-keeper, but quickly developed into an all-rounder with both bat and ball. From Shrewsbury, he matriculated to Magdalen College, Oxford.

== Sporting career ==
=== Cricket ===
At Oxford he made his debut in first-class cricket for Oxford University against Somerset at Oxford in 1893. Initially finding it difficult to establish himself in what was a strong Oxford side, he played once more in 1893, against the Marylebone Cricket Club, and six times in 1894; his appearance in that season's University Match against Cambridge University earned him the first of his two blues. He made four further appearances for Oxford in 1895, followed by seven in 1896. In nineteen matches for Oxford, he scored 383 runs at an average of 12.76, with a highest score of 58. With his right-arm fast-medium bowling, he took 46 wickets at a bowling average of 20.39; claiming two five wicket hauls, with best figures of 6 for 62. His bowling was typically utilised in short spells, with Raikes heading the Oxford bowling averages in 1894 and 1895.

Raikes played in Norfolk's inaugural Minor Counties Championship match against Lincolnshire in 1895, though after top-scoring with 27 in Norfolk's first innings, he was recalled midway through the match by Oxford captain Gerald Mordaunt to travel to Maidstone to play against Kent. He made six appearances that season, including as captain in Norfolk's second match against Hertfordshire. In the 1896 Minor Counties Championship he would make a further three appearances, and after graduating from Oxford, Raikes played for Norfolk in the 1897 Minor Counties Championship, doing so alongside his brother, Ernest. His ordination into the Anglican church later in 1897 bought to an end his first spell at Norfolk. His ecclesiastical duties took him to Portsmouth in Hampshire, where he was one of a dozen curates at Portsea during Cosmo Gordon Lang's tenure as vicar at St Mary's Church.

Likely due to him residing in Portsmouth, Raikes played a first-class match for an Oxford University Past and Present against the touring Australians in the town at the United Services Recreation Ground in 1899. The following year, he began playing for Hampshire, who possessed a weakened team, due in large part to the loss of many players to service in the Second Boer War. Debuting at Southampton against Derbyshire in the County Championship, he scored a pair of 40s and took five wickets in the match. His successful start continued in his second match against Warwickshire, when he scored 60 runs and took four wickets, while in his third match against Yorkshire, he top-scored with 77 in Hampshire's second innings. The following season, he made a further five appearances, before making a final appearance against Derbyshire in the 1902 County Championship. In nine first-class matches for Hampshire, he scored 409 runs at an average of 27.26, while with the ball he took 25 wickets at an average of 30.24.

Following the end of his ecclesiastical duties in Portsmouth, Raikes returned to play for Norfolk in the Minor Counties Championship in 1904. At the time of his second spell with Norfolk, Raikes had become a leg spin bowler. He captained Norfolk to the Minor Counties Championship title in both 1905 and 1910, and played for the county until 1913, having made an additional 35 minor counties appearances. In total, Raikes scored 3,419 runs for Norfolk from 49 matches, in addition to taking 282 wickets; 57 of these wickets came in Norfolk's triumphant 1910 season. Despite having not played first-class cricket for a decade, Raikes later made a final first-class appearance in 1912 for an England XI against the touring Australians at Norwich. Solid in defence, but also able to score at a faster pace, he scored 816 runs in thirty first-class matches, while taking 71 wickets as a bowler. He was known to field predominantly at mid-off, taking thirty catches during his first-class career.

=== Football ===
Prior to his matriculation to Oxford, Raikes played football as a goalkeeper for Wymondham Town, and played for Norfolk County against Cambridge University in November 1892. In addition to playing cricket whilst at Oxford, he also played football for Oxford University A.F.C., winning a blue in football in each of the four years from 1893 to 1896. Whilst at Oxford, Raikes was capped four times for England in the British Home Championship, making his international debut in a 1–1 draw with Wales in 1895 at Queen's Club. His three other appearances came in 1896, against Ireland, Wales and Scotland respectively. There is some dispute over whether Raikes captained England in their international against Ireland on 7 March 1896, with Gilbert Smith and Lewis Vaughan Lodge the other potential candidates for captain. The list provided by the FA does not include Raikes as an England captain, however both the Irish Saturday Night and The Irish Times gave Raikes the captaincy.

Raikes seldom played football at club level, but did represent both the Casuals and Corinthian. The majority of his football came while studying at Oxford, with Raikes retiring from playing at the age of 23 in order to concentrate on his ecclesiastical duties. He was said to have a weak kick, but a powerful punch, having been reported on several occasions to have cleared the ball into the opposition half by punching it.

== Later life and death ==
After being ordained in 1897, Raikes remained curate of Portsea until 1905. He was then appointed chaplain to the Duke of Portland, an appointment which he held until 1920. He then became Rector of Bergh Apton in Norfolk, remaining there until 1936. Raikes died at Lamyatt near Shepton Mallet in Somerset on 18 December 1966, at the age of 93. He had been one of the oldest living first-class cricketers.

== Works cited ==
- Musk, Stephen (2017). George Raikes: 'Muscular Christianity?'. Cardiff: ACS. ISBN 9781908165770.
- "Obituaries". The Cricketer (Spring ed.). London. 1967.
- Oxford men, 1880-1892, with a record of their schools, honours and degrees. London: James Parker & Co. 1893 – via Internet Archive.
- Betts, Graham (2006). England: Player by player. Swindon: Green Umbrella Publishing. ISBN 1905009631.
