= Senator Glenn (disambiguation) =

John Glenn (1921–2016) was a U.S. Senator from Ohio from 1974 to 1999.

Senator Glenn may also refer to:

- Archibald A. Glenn (1819–1901), Illinois State Senate
- Gene W. Glenn (1928–2023), Iowa State Senate
- Otis F. Glenn (1879–1959), U.S. Senator from Illinois from 1928 to 1933
- Robert Broadnax Glenn (1854–1920), North Carolina State Senate
- Robert Glenn (Wisconsin politician) (1858–1915), Wisconsin State Senate
- Thomas L. Glenn (1847–1918), Idaho State Senate
