= Philip Wodehouse =

Philip Wodehouse may refer to:

- Sir Philip Wodehouse, 1st Baronet (?–1623), English baronet, soldier and Member of Parliament
- Sir Philip Wodehouse, 3rd Baronet (1608–1681), English baronet and Member of Parliament
- Philip Wodehouse (Royal Navy officer) (1773–1838), British Royal Navy vice-admiral
- Sir Philip Wodehouse (colonial administrator) (1811–1887), British colonial administrator
