= Thomas Raikes (cricketer) =

Indian-born English cricketer

Personal information
- Full name: Thomas Barkley Raikes
- Born: 16 December 1902; Malabar Hill, Bombay, British India
- Died: 2 March 1984 (aged 81); Rickinghall Superior, Suffolk, England
- Batting: Right-handed
- Bowling: Right-arm medium
- Relatives: Ernest Raikes (father); George Raikes (uncle)

Domestic team information
- Years: Team
- 1922–1925: Oxford University

Career statistics
Competition	First-class
Matches	38
Runs scored	554
Batting average	12.88
100s/50s	0/0
Top score	44
Balls bowled	6,704
Wickets	132
Bowling average	25.03
5 wickets in innings	7
10 wickets in match	2
Best bowling	9/38
Catches/stumpings	23/–
- Source: CricketArchive, 16 March 2009

Thomas Barkley Raikes (16 December 1902 – 2 March 1984) was an Indian-born English cricketer who played 38 first-class games for Oxford University in the 1920s. He also played minor counties cricket for Norfolk County Cricket Club.

He was educated at Winchester College, and in 1921 had a particularly fine year: he captained the side, topped the bowling averages and was second in the batting averages. In July against Charterhouse, he scored 94 and then took 8/14, no runs at all being conceded by him until he had taken all eight wickets. After going up to Trinity College, Oxford, and taking 5/5 in the (non-first-class) Freshmen's match, Raikes was brought into the full university side.

Wisden considered that "[a]t this point it seemed that he might well take his place among the leading bowlers of the day", but although he had a good 1923 season, he never lived up to this early promise as he put on weight, having found "the pleasure of life at Oxford too alluring". He did, however, turn in an excellent performance against the Army in 1924, taking 13 wickets in the match. Neither his match figures of 13/80 nor his second-innings return of 9/38 have been beaten since (as of 2009) by an Oxford bowler.

In June 1922, during Oxford's match against Surrey at The Oval, Raikes was involved in a bizarre run-out incident: he and his batting partner R. C. Robertson-Glasgow became hopelessly confused over a second, then third, run, and ended up at the same end on both occasions. Meanwhile, the Surrey fielders repeatedly fumbled the ball before eventually wicket-keeper Bert Strudwick managed to remove the bails. Even then, it was unclear which of the batsmen was out: Robertson-Glasgow said that Raikes walked off of his own accord, while another tale says that the matter was settled by the toss of a coin.

Two of Raikes' relatives played first-class cricket: his father Ernest Raikes played in India for Europeans and Bombay, while his uncle George Raikes played for Oxford and Hampshire and made four appearances for the England football team.
