= Mary Coulcher =

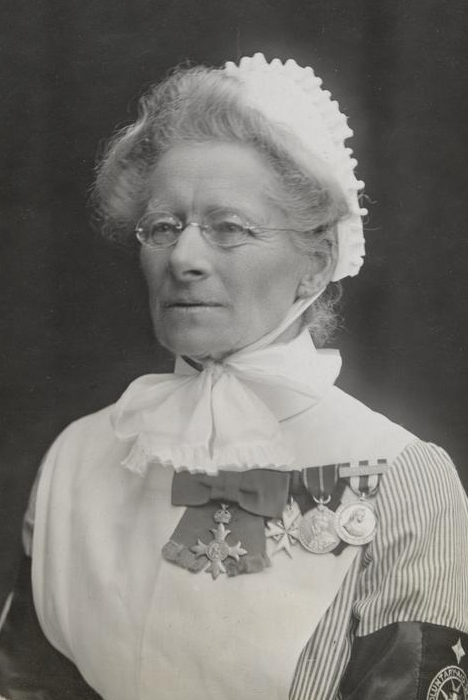
- Born: 19 November 1852; Rickinghall Superior
- Died: 15 June 1925 (aged 72); Ipswich
- Occupation: Hospital head
- Known for: St John Ambulance organisation in Ipswich

Mary Caroline Coulcher OBE GCStJ (19 November 1852 – 15 June 1925) was a British philanthropist involved with the St John Ambulance organisation. She was a full time volunteer during the war and she gave the first motorised ambulance to Ipswich's St John Ambulance.

== Life ==
Coulcher was born in Rickinghall Superior in 1852. Her parents were Jane Sarah (born Hawtayne) and the Revd George Coulcher. Her father was the, Rector of Wattisfield. She went to school in Clapham at the Lymington House School. She moved to Ipswich in 1870 and seven years later the St John Ambulance organisation was formed in England. The organisation was designed to deliver first aid on the spot to accident victims and those who were sick. Coulcher launched the St John Ambulance organisation in Ipswich. In January 1880 she became the Hon Local Secretary of the Ipswich Centre of the St John Ambulance Association (SJAA).

She was Ipswich's first female candidate at a municipal election, serving as a town councillor from 1909 to 1912.

Ipswich had ambulances in 1914 but they relied on horse-power. It was Coulcher's enthusiasm and money that led to the purchase of Ipswich's first motorised ambulance. (Coulcher was a continued source for support as she supplied a second ambulance in 1924).

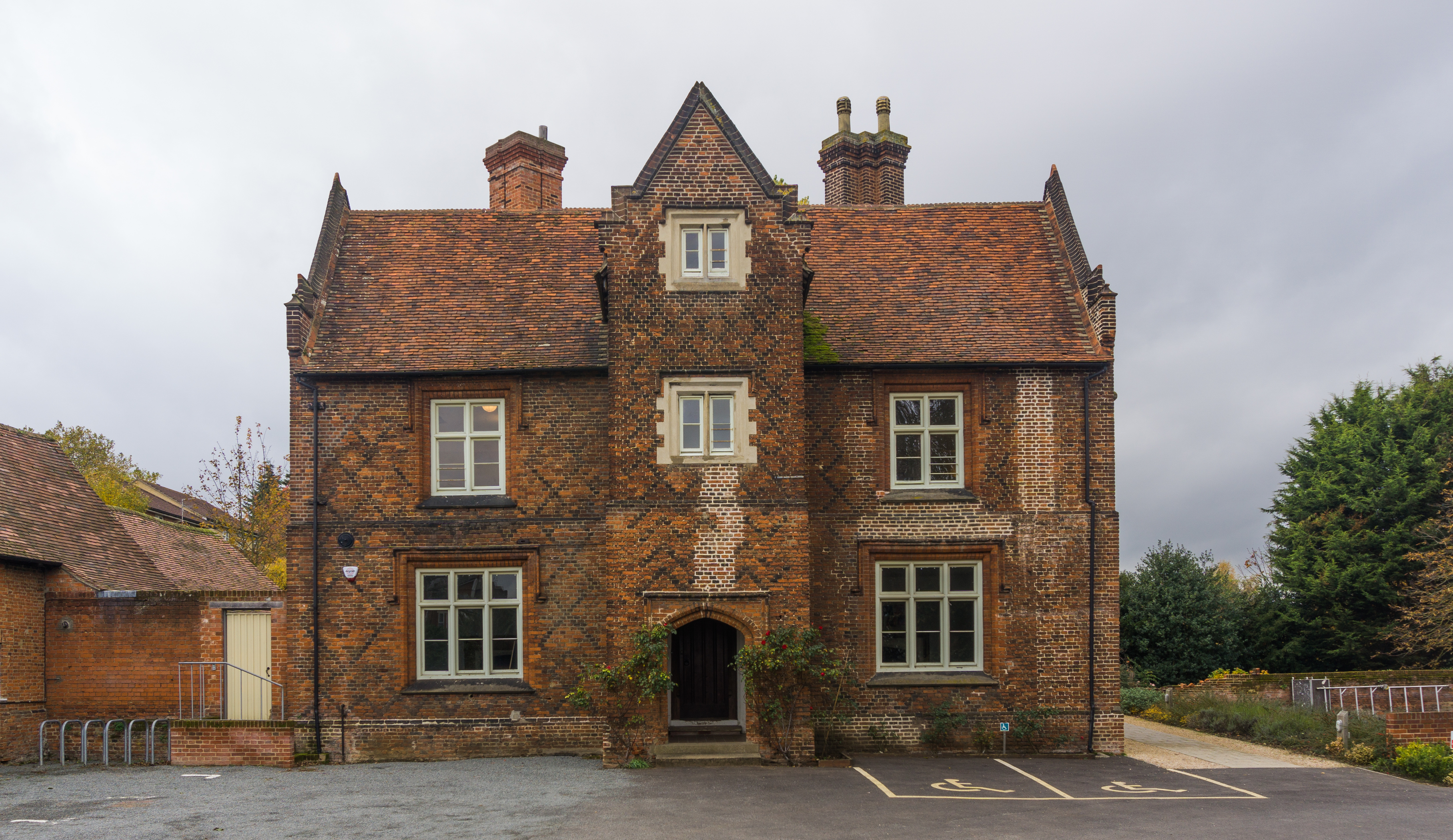
Gippeswyk Hall - an isolation hospital during World War I

During World War I she led an isolation hospital at Gippeswyk Hall in Ipswich. - her records show that she was full time and voluntary.

She was awarded an OBE in 1918 and after retired from active duty in 1919 she was awarded a CBE in 1920.

Coulcher died in Ipswich. Her life was one of the inspirations for a play titled "Dread Zeppelin" by the Red Rose Chain theatre.

== Awards ==
In 1902 she was honoured as a Lady of Grace of the Order of St John of Jerusalem. In 1909 she was given the St John Ambulance Brigade Service medal and in 1914 it was upgrade to "with Bar". She received the King George V Coronation Medal in 1911. Honoured as an Officer of the Order of the British Empire in January 1918.
