= Charlie Adamson =

British Lions & England international rugby union footballer & cricketer

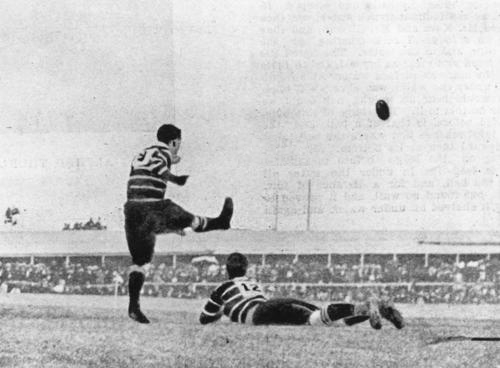
- Charlie Adamson taking a kick in Rugby Union Test, Brisbane, 1899.
- Born: Charles Young Adamson; 18 April 1875 Durham, England
- Died: 17 September 1918 (aged 43) Doiran, Macedonia, Kingdom of Greece
- School: Durham School
- Notable relative(s): Lewis Vaughan Lodge, brother-in-law

Rugby union career
- Position: Half-backs
Amateur team(s)
Years	Team	Apps	(Points)
- Durham
–	Barbarian F.C.		
–	Bristol Rugby		
International career
Years	Team	Apps	(Points)
1899	British Isles	4	(17)

Charles Young Adamson (18 April 1875 – 17 September 1918) was an English international rugby union utility back who played club rugby for Durham. Adamson played international rugby for the British Isles team on its 1899 tour of Australia. Adamson was also a gentleman cricketer, playing mainly for Durham City. After the 1899 rugby tour, he remained in Brisbane playing for the Valley District Cricket Club and turned out for a single cricket match for Queensland, as well as playing in Durham's first Minor Counties Championship match in 1895. He played for Durham until 1914.

== Personal history ==
Adamson was born in Neville's Cross, County Durham in 1875 to John Adamson of Little Grant, Wisconsin. The Adamson family were strongly connected to cricket, with John representing Durham, and Adamson's sons, Charles Lodge Adamson and John Alfred Adamson playing in the minor counties. Adamson was brother-in-law to Lewis Vaughan Lodge, who played international football for England. Adamson set up in business, and ran a hotel in partnership with William Henry Wood and John Adamson, but the business was dissolved on 18 October 1917.

During the First World War, Adamson was a captain (Quartermaster) in the 6th Battalion of the Royal Scots Fusiliers. He was killed on 17 September 1918 during an assault on enemy trenches at the Fourth Battle of Doiran on the Macedonian front in the Kingdom of Greece. He is buried at Karasouli Military Cemetery in Thessaloniki regional unit.

== Rugby career ==
Adamson came to note as a rugby player while representing Durham School and Durham City Rugby Football Club. In 1898, he was made a member of invitational touring side The Barbarians. Although never representing the England national team, Adamson was invited to tour with the British Isles team on the first official tour of Australia in 1899. Adamson was the stand-out player of the tour, being selected in all 20 matches and amassing 136 points in all games. He scored 17 points from the Test matches, two tries, four conversions and a penalty goal, making him the Tour's top scorer. In total he scored 8 tries, 35 conversions, 3 dropped goals and 10 penalty goals, 136-point by 1899 IRB rules; 149 by modern (2009) scoring rules. In the First Test, Adamson was placed at centre, alongside Gwyn Nicholls; but after the British team lost the game, team captain Matthew Mullineux dropped himself from the team to bring Adamson into his position at half-back. This move is seen as the turning point in the tour, and the British team won the final three Tests, with Adamson scoring in all three victories.

On his return to Britain, Adamson continued playing rugby and during the 1901–02 season represented Bristol.

== Bibliography ==
- Griffiths, John (1990). British Lions. Swindon: Crowood Press. ISBN 1-85223-541-1.
