= Alice Sutcliffe =

English writer

Alice Sutcliffe (fl. 1624 – 1634), born Alice Woodhouse or Woodhows, was an English religious writer. Her only known literary work, Meditations of Man's Mortalitie, or, A Way to True Blessednesse, was first published in 1633.

== Life ==
Little is known about Sutcliffe's life. Her father was Thomas Woodhouse (or Woodhows), of Kimberley, Norfolk. Alice married John Sutcliffe, a Yorkshire landowner and nephew of Matthew Sutcliffe, c. 1624. As John became Groom of the Privy Chamber to Charles I and had been a squire to James I, Alice was likely at Charles' court around that period, although she may also have been at the court of James. John was associated with George Villiers, 1st Duke of Buckingham (Katherine's husband) and his faction.

== Meditations of Man's Mortalitie ==
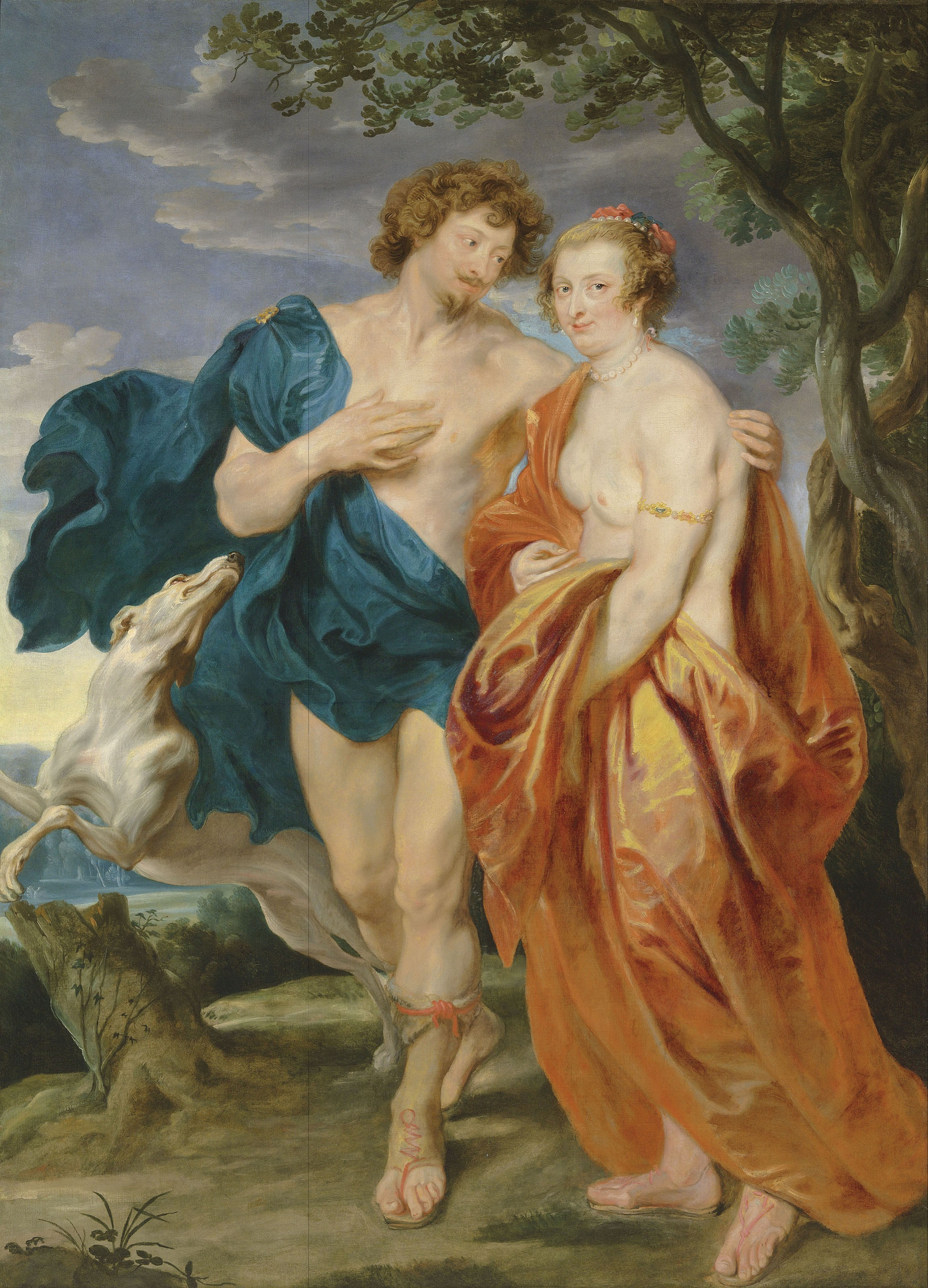
Katherine and George Villiers, Duchess and Duke of Buckingham, by Anthony van Dyck, c. 1620–21. The Meditations is dedicated to Katherine, and Alice's husband John was a member of George's circle.

Sutcliffe is known to have published only one work, Meditations of Man's Mortalitie, or, A Way to True Blessednesse, entered on the Stationers' Register on 20 January 1633 and first published in 1633. Its second edition was prefaced with appreciations from Ben Jonson, George Wither, and Thomas May. Maynard suggests that these poems were probably intended to boost Sutcliffe's reputation at court; Walker concurs, observing that Sutcliffe's text "loudly promotes the novelty value of this woman's work".

Sutcliffe was likely an intimate of Katherine Villiers, Duchess of Buckingham, given that she dedicates her meditations to Villiers and her sister-in-law Susan Feilding, Countess of Denbigh. Another poem in the work is dedicated to Philip Herbert, 4th Earl of Pembroke.

Her Meditations includes six meditations in prose followed by "Of Our Losse by Adam, and Our Gayne by Christ", a poem in 88 sestets. Stevenson and Davidson describe the poetic portion of the work as a "summary of Christian belief".

As its title suggests, the Meditations is concerned with mortality: Patricia Demers notes its "sheer abundance of images of transience"; Germaine Greer observes that its prose portions are preoccupied with the Last Judgment. The work evinces a depth of religious knowledge.

Salzman likens Sutcliffe's Meditations to Miscellanea (1604) by Elizabeth Grimston, given that both works are structured as a combination of prose meditations and poetry. Longfellow suggests a comparison with Salve Deus Rex Judaeorum (1611) by Emilia Lanier, as Sutcliffe and Lanier both apparently seek to elevate their social status through the written word.

Walker argues that, by publishing her Meditations, Sutcliffe took on a "heavy burden of defense" in the public eye, and accordingly needed to embrace patriarchal tropes in her work to avoid popular censure.

== Sources ==
- Greer, Germaine (2000). Kissing the Rod: An Anthology of 17th Century Women's Verse. London: Virago. ISBN 1-86049-710-1. OCLC 43377650.
- Hughey, Ruth (1934). "Forgotten Verses by Ben Jonson, George Wither, and Others to Alice Sutcliffe". The Review of English Studies. Old series. 10 (38): 156–164. doi:10.1093/res/os-X.38.156. ISSN 0034-6551. JSTOR 508208.
- Walker, Kim (1996). Women Writers of the English Renaissance. New York: Twayne Publishers. ISBN 0-8057-7017-8. OCLC 34471353.

== See also ==
- Memento mori
- Vanitas
