= Roger Woodhouse =

16th-century English politician

Roger Woodhouse (c. 1541 – 1588), of Kimberley, Norfolk, was an English politician.

Woodhouse was the eldest son of Thomas Woodhouse. His mother was Margaret, the daughter Sir John Shelton of Shelton. Roger was knighted in 1578.

Woodhouse was a Member of parliament (MP) of the Parliament of England for Aldeburgh, for Norfolk in 1572 and for Thetford in 1586.

Woodhouse married Mary, daughter of John Corbet of Sprowston, and had two sons and one daughter.

Woodhouse died in 1588, and was buried on 4 April 1588 at Kimberly. His heir was his son, Philip Woodhouse.
