= Kimberley and Carleton Forehoe =

Civil parish in Norfolk, England

Coordinates: 52.600°N 1.075°E

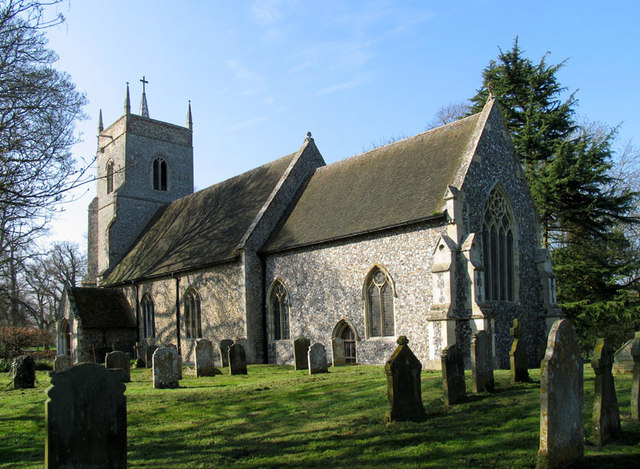
- St Peter's church, Kimberley

- Location within Norfolk
- Area: 9.33 km^{2} (3.60 sq mi)
- Population: 121 (2001 census)
  - Density: 13/km^{2} (34/sq mi)
- OS grid reference: TG083046
- Civil parish: Kimberley and Carleton Forehoe
- District: South Norfolk
- Shire county: Norfolk
- Region: East
- Country: England
- Sovereign state: United Kingdom
- Post town: WYMONDHAM
- Postcode district: NR18
- Dialling code: 01953
- Police: Norfolk
- Fire: Norfolk
- Ambulance: East of England

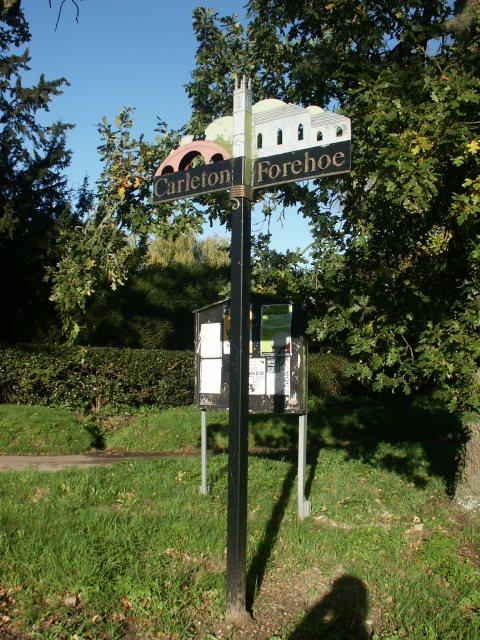
Carleton Forehoe

Kimberley and Carleton Forehoe is a civil parish in the South Norfolk district of the county of Norfolk, England. It encompasses the villages of Kimberley and Carleton Forehoe, covering an area of 9.33 km^{2} (3.60 sq mi). The parish had a total population of 121 in 52 households as of the 2001 census.

On 1 April 1935 the parish of Carleton Forehoe was merged with that of Kimberley to form the modern parish.
