= Charles Lodge Adamson =

English cricketer

Charles Adamson
Personal information
- Full name: Charles Lodge Adamson
- Born: 18 May 1906; Haverton Hill, County Durham, England
- Died: 18 November 1979 (aged 73); Durham, County Durham, England
- Batting: Right-handed
- Relatives: Charlie Adamson (father); Lewis Vaughan Lodge (uncle)

Domestic team information
- Years: Team
- 1934: Minor Counties
- 1926–1939: Durham

Career statistics
Competition	First-class
Matches	1
Runs scored	15
Batting average	7.50
100s/50s	–/–
Top score	15
Balls bowled	–
Wickets	–
Bowling average	–
5 wickets in innings	–
10 wickets in match	–
Best bowling	–
Catches/stumpings	–/–
- Source: Cricinfo, 6 August 2011

Charles Lodge Adamson (18 May 1906 – 18 November 1979) was an English first-class cricketer. Adamson was a right-handed batsman. The son of Durham cricketer and rugby union international Charlie Adamson, he was born in Haverton Hill, County Durham and educated at Durham School, where he represented the school cricket team.

Adamson made his debut for Durham against the Lancashire Second XI in the 1926 Minor Counties Championship. He played minor counties cricket for Durham from 1926 to 1939, making 79 Minor Counties Championship appearances. He made a single first-class appearance for the Minor Counties against Oxford University in 1934. Opening the batting in the first innings with Robert Remnant, he scored 15 runs before being dismissed by Kenneth Jackson. In the second-innings he opened the batting with William Sime but was dismissed for a duck by Norman Mitchell-Innes. World War II ended his cricket career prematurely in 1939.

Adamson graduated from Durham University with a Bachelor of Arts degree in 1928. His father, also called Charles, played minor counties cricket for Durham, as well as first-class cricket for Queensland, who he played for once while on the 1899 British Lions rugby union tour to Australia. His uncle, Lewis Vaughan Lodge, played international football for England, as well as first-class cricket for Hampshire.
