= Brodtville, Wisconsin =

- Unincorporated community
- Location within Wisconsin Location within the United States
- Coordinates: 42°57′09″N 91°02′47″W
- Country: United States
- State: Wisconsin
- County: Grant
- Town: Wyalusing
- Elevation: 1,106 ft (337 m)
- Time zone: UTC-6 (Central (CST))
  - Summer (DST): UTC-5 (CDT)
- Area code: 608
- GNIS feature ID: 1562230

Brodtville is an unincorporated community located in the town of Wyalusing, Grant County, Wisconsin, United States. The community was named for Joakim Brodt, the first postmaster when the post office was established in May 1864.
