= Henry Wodehouse =

English cricketer

Henry Wodehouse (born 19 March 1799, Kimberley, Norfolk; died 29 April 1834, Montagu Square, London) was an English cricketer with amateur status. He was associated with Marylebone Cricket Club (MCC) and made his debut in 1828. He played for the Gentlemen in the Gentlemen v Players match.

== Bibliography ==
- Haygarth, Arthur (1862). Scores & Biographies, Volume 2 (1827–1840). Lillywhite.
