= Sir Thomas Wodehouse, 2nd Baronet =

English baronet and Member of Parliament

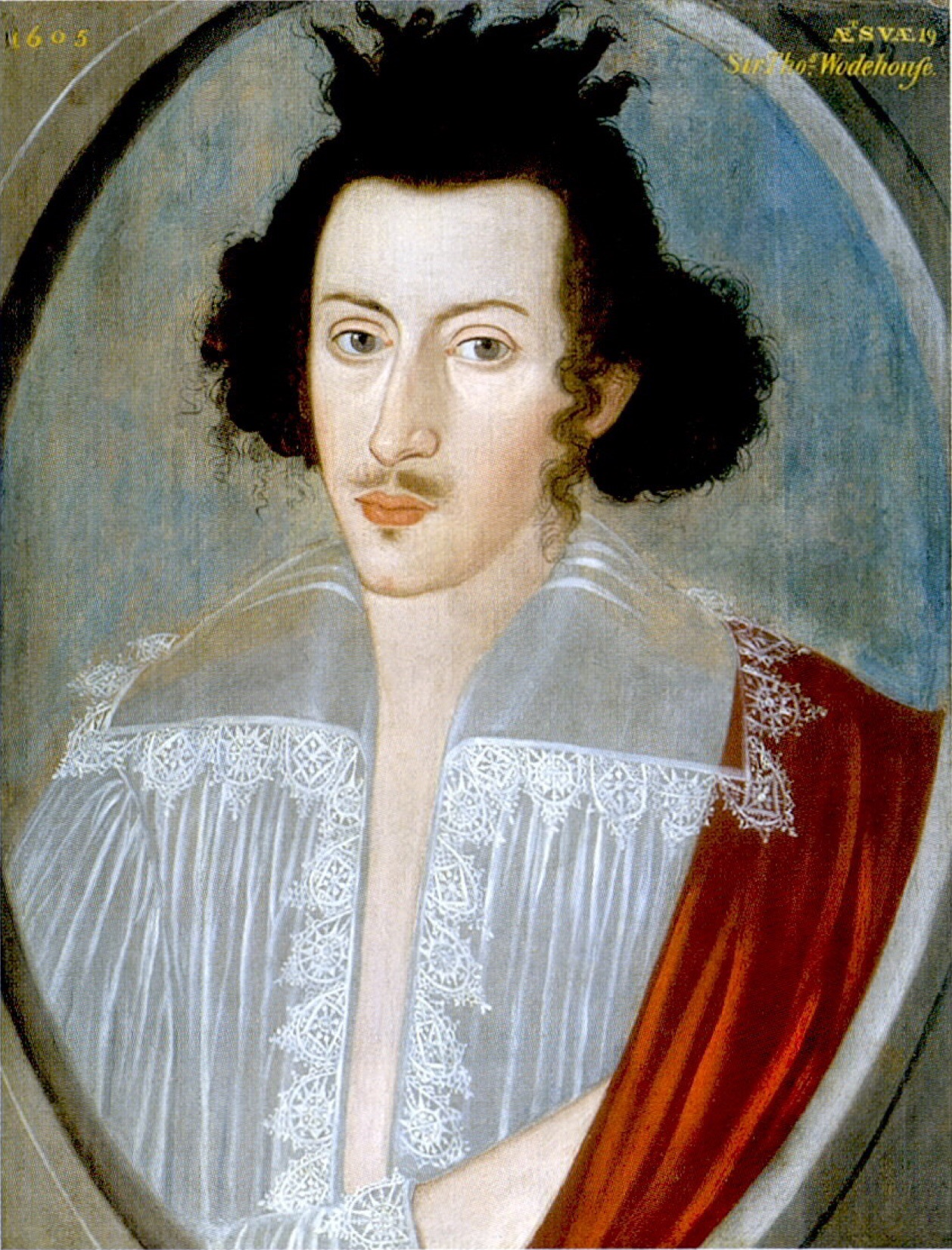
Sir Thomas Wodehouse in 1605, by an unknown artist.

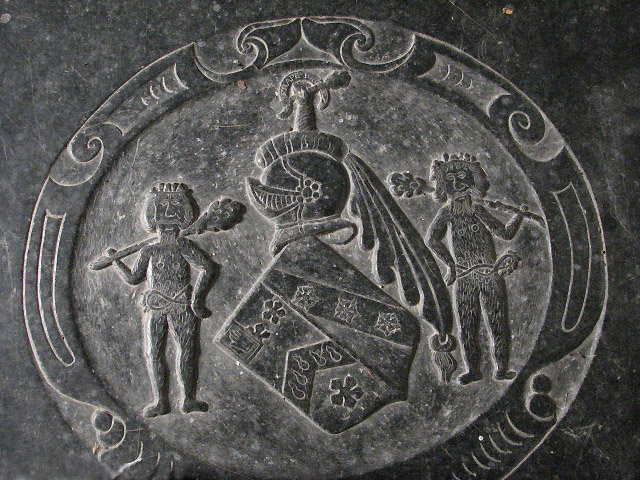
Detail from ledger stone of Sir Thomas Wodehouse, 2nd Baronet, in St Peter's Church, Kimberley, Norfolk, displaying arms of Wodehouse impaling Carey, for his second wife.

Sir Thomas Wodehouse, 2nd Baronet (c. 1585 – 18 March 1658), was an English baronet and Member of Parliament.

Wodehouse was the son of Sir Philip Wodehouse, 1st Baronet, of Kimberley, Norfolk, and his wife Grizell Yelverton, daughter of William Yelverton. He was Member of Parliament for Thetford from 1640 to 1653, and served as High Sheriff of Norfolk in 1624.

Wodehouse married Blanche Carey, daughter of John Carey, 3rd Baron Hunsdon, on 16 June 1605. She died on 6 November 1651. Wodehouse survived her by six years and died on 18 March 1658. He was succeeded in the baronetcy by his son Philip.

Parliament of England
Vacant Parliament suspended since 1629	Member of Parliament for Thetford; 1640–1653; With: Framlingham Gawdy 1640–1648	Vacant Thetford not represented
Baronetage of England
Preceded by Philip Wodehouse	Baronet of Wilberhall; 1623–1658	Succeeded by Philip Wodehouse
