= Ernest Raikes =

English cricketer and legal advocate

Personal information
- Full name: Ernest Barkley Raikes
- Born: 18 November 1863; Carleton Forehoe, Norfolk, England
- Died: 7 December 1931 (aged 68); Ham Common, Surrey, England
- Bowling: Slow
- Relatives: Thomas Raikes (son); George Raikes (brother)

Domestic team information
- Years: Team
- 1892/93–1900/01: Europeans
- 1892/93: Bombay
- 1897–1909: Norfolk

Career statistics
| Competition | First-class |
|---|---|
| Matches | 9 |
| Runs scored | 51 |
| Batting average | 6.37 |
| 100s/50s | 0/0 |
| Top score | 18* |
| Balls bowled | 1,464 |
| Wickets | 49 |
| Bowling average | 10.28 |
| 5 wickets in innings | 3 |
| 10 wickets in match | 2 |
| Best bowling | 8/22 |
| Catches/stumpings | 1/– |
- Source: ESPNcricinfo, 17 July 2019

Ernest Barkley Raikes OBE QC (18 November 1863 – 7 December 1931) was an English first-class cricketer and a legal advocate based in Bombay in British India between 1889 and 1914. While in India he played first-class cricket for the Europeans cricket team and Bombay.

== Life and career ==
Raikes was born at Carleton Forehoe in Norfolk in November 1863 to the Reverend Francis Raikes and his wife, Martha Barkley. He was educated at Haileybury, before going up to Keble College, Oxford. He studied classics at Oxford, graduating in 1887, before being called to the bar at the Inner Temple in 1888. He practiced law in Bombay, where he worked as an advocate at the Bombay High Court from 1889–1914. Raikes served on the staff of Lord Harris during his tenure as Governor of Bombay.

While in British India, he made his debut in first-class cricket for the Europeans cricket team against the Parsees at Bombay in the 1892–93 Bombay Presidency, which was the first cricket match played in India with first-class status. He made seven further first-class appearances for the Europeans, all against the Parsees, with his last appearance coming in the 1900–01 Bombay Presidency. In addition to playing for the Europeans, he also featured once for Mumbai against Lord Hawke's XI touring team in 1892–93. A slow bowler, Raikes took 46 wickets for the Europeans at an average of 9.08, with best figures of 8 for 22. These figures, one of three five wicket hauls he took in first-class cricket, came against the Parsees at Poona in September 1894. He was present in England in the summer of 1897, when he played minor counties cricket for Norfolk, making eight appearances in the Minor Counties Championship, later making two appearances in 1901 and a further appearance in 1909.

He married Hilda Barkley in October 1899, with the couple having two sons and two daughters. Their eldest son, Thomas, was a first-class cricketer. In later life, he served as the county secretary to the Norfolk branch of the British Red Cross, for services to which he was made an OBE in the 1919 New Year Honours. He died in December 1931 at Ham Common, Surrey. His brother, George, was a first-class cricketer and international footballer.
