= Wyalusing, Wisconsin =

- Town
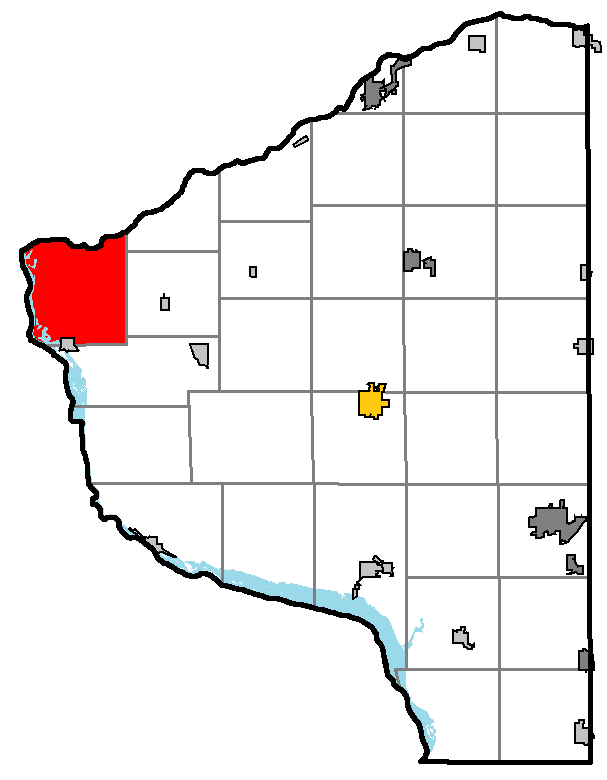
- Location of Wyalusing, within Grant County, Wisconsin

- Location of Grant County, Wisconsin
- Coordinates: 42°56′23″N 91°5′37″W
- Country: United States
- State: Wisconsin
- County: Grant

Area
  - Total: 42.5 sq mi (110.2 km^{2})
  - Land: 39.9 sq mi (103.3 km^{2})
  - Water: 2.7 sq mi (6.9 km^{2})
- Elevation: 928 ft (283 m)

Population (2020)
  - Total: 336
  - Density: 8.42/sq mi (3.25/km^{2})
- Time zone: UTC-6 (Central (CST))
  - Summer (DST): UTC-5 (CDT)
- Area code: 608
- FIPS code: 55-89250
- GNIS feature ID: 1584486

Wyalusing is a town in Grant County, Wisconsin, United States. The population was 336 at the 2020 census. The unincorporated communities of Brodtville and Wyalusing are located in the town. Pioneer Robert Glenn, Sr. is credited with naming the village "Wyalusing" after Wyalusing, Pennsylvania, because of a perceived resemblance.

== Geography ==
According to the United States Census Bureau, the town has a total area of 42.6 square miles (110.3 km^{2}), of which 39.9 square miles (103.3 km^{2}) is land and 2.7 square miles (6.9 km^{2}) (6.27%) is water.

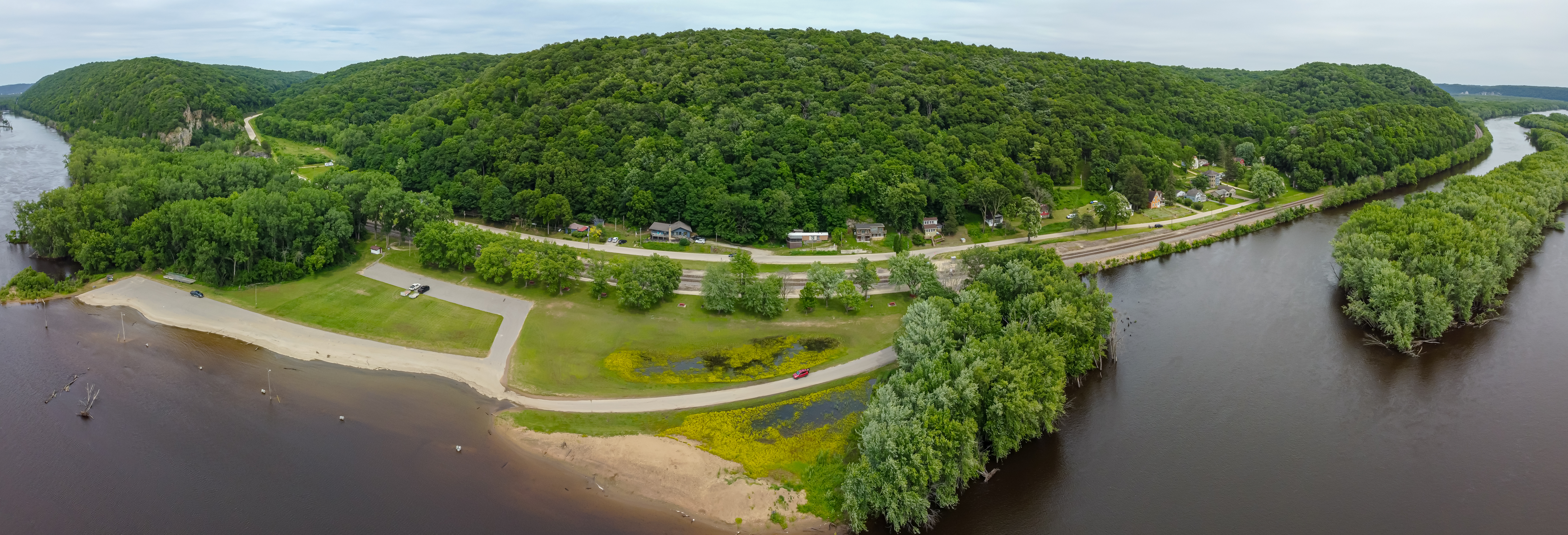
BNSF Railway runs through town

== Demographics ==
As of the census of 2000, there were 370 people, 155 households, and 112 families living in the town. The population density was 9.3 people per square mile (3.6/km^{2}). There were 183 housing units at an average density of 4.6 per square mile (1.8/km^{2}). The racial makeup of the town was 97.57% White, 1.08% Native American, 0.54% from other races, and 0.81% from two or more races. Hispanic or Latino of any race were 0.81% of the population.

There were 155 households, out of which 27.1% had children under the age of 18 living with them, 61.9% were married couples living together, 6.5% had a female householder with no husband present, and 27.7% were non-families. 22.6% of all households were made up of individuals, and 5.8% had someone living alone who was 65 years of age or older. The average household size was 2.39 and the average family size was 2.81.

In the town, the population was spread out, with 23.2% under the age of 18, 2.7% from 18 to 24, 26.2% from 25 to 44, 27.0% from 45 to 64, and 20.8% who were 65 years of age or older. The median age was 44 years. For every 100 females, there were 101.1 males. For every 100 females age 18 and over, there were 110.4 males.

The median income for a household in the town was $29,038, and the median income for a family was $35,000. Males had a median income of $21,719 versus $18,333 for females. The per capita income for the town was $14,602. About 4.0% of families and 8.8% of the population were below the poverty line, including 10.8% of those under age 18 and 13.4% of those age 65 or over.

== Wyalusing State Park ==
The state park is situated at the junction of the Mississippi River and Wisconsin River. There are hardwood and pine forests, bluffs and wetlands. Many forest animals typical of Wisconsin take refuge here, along with seasonal migratory birds. There also exists a legend about a treasure, stolen from a nearby military fortification's salary, supposedly buried on a bluff somewhere in this area.

== Notable people ==
- Robert Glenn, Sr., pioneer farmer, local official and state assemblyman
- Robert Glenn, state senator and county sheriff
- Robert R. Young, Whig member of the 2nd Wisconsin Legislature in 1849
