= Robert R. Young (politician) =

American politician

Robert R. Young was an American from Grant County, Wisconsin—sometimes reported as being from Wyalusing—sometimes as from Hazel Green. who served a single term in the 1849 2nd Wisconsin Legislature as a Whig member of the Wisconsin State Assembly from Grant County.

== Background ==
In 1843, he married Lucinda Stiles, daughter of David Stiles and Elizabeth Cummins Stiles. By 1859, he, she and the husband she married "several years after his death" were all dead and buried in the same cemetery in Hazel Green. In 1847, Young was nominated for Grant County tax assessor, and was elected along with almost the entirety of the Whig ticket that year.
