= Wyalusing (community), Wisconsin =

Wyalusing, Wisconsin
- Unincorporated community
- Location within Wisconsin Location within the United States
- Coordinates: 42°56′38″N 91°08′29″W
- Country: United States
- State: Wisconsin
- County: Grant
- Town: Wyalusing
- Elevation: 630 ft (190 m)
- Time zone: UTC-6 (Central (CST))
  - Summer (DST): UTC-5 (CDT)
- Zip: 53828
- Area code: 608
- GNIS feature ID: 1577059

Wyalusing is an unincorporated community located in the town of Wyalusing, Grant County, Wisconsin, United States. Pioneer Robert Glenn, Sr. is credited with naming the area "Wyalusing" after Wyalusing, Pennsylvania, because of a perceived resemblance.
