= Wyalusing State Park =

State park in Grant County, Wisconsin

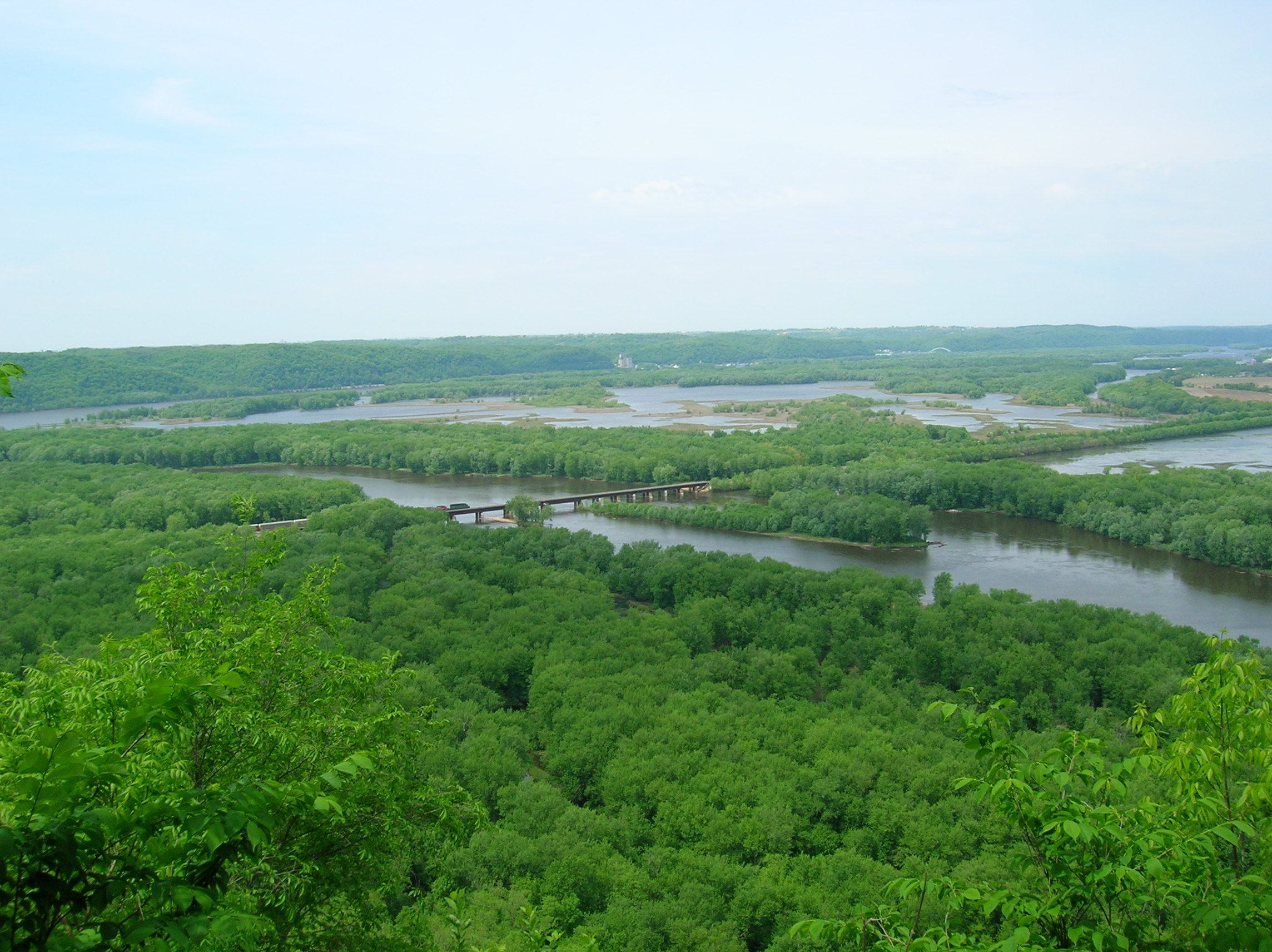

- Location within Wisconsin Location within the United States
- Interactive map of Wyalusing State Park
- Location: Grant County, Wisconsin, United States
- Nearest city: Prairie du Chien, Wisconsin
- Coordinates: 42°58′47″N 91°6′31″W
- Area: 2,628 acres (1,064 ha)
- Established: 1917
- Administrator: Wisconsin Department of Natural Resources
- Website: Official website
- Wisconsin State Parks

U.S. National Natural Landmark
- Official name: Wyalusing Hardwood Forest
- Designated: 1973

Wyalusing State Park /waɪ.əˈluːsɪŋ/ is a 2,628-acre (1,064 ha) Wisconsin state park at the confluence of the Mississippi and Wisconsin rivers in the village Bagley, just south of Prairie du Chien.

Wyalusing means "home of the warrior" in the Lenape language spoken by Munsee-Delaware tribes who settled in the area in the 19th century after being displaced from farther east. Five-hundred-foot-high (150 m) bluffs dotted with prehistoric Native American mounds look out over the river valleys. Two park resources have been recognized nationally: the Wyalusing Hardwood Forest is a National Natural Landmark and the Wyalusing State Park Mounds Archaeological District is on the National Register of Historic Places.

== History ==
John Nolen recommended Wyalusing as one of four locations for Wisconsin's first state parks in a 1909 report to the State Parks Board. It became Wisconsin's fourth state park when it was established in 1917 on land originally belonging to former State Senator Robert Glenn. Originally named Nelson Dewey State Park after Wisconsin's first governor, it was changed to Wyalusing State Park in 1937.

== Geology ==
The park is in the Driftless Area of Wisconsin, a portion of territory that remained ice free during the last ice age, while land to the east and west was crushed by glaciers. The high bluffs along the Mississippi River and the large deep canyon of the Wisconsin River are evidence of glacial meltwaters reshaping this region.

== Activities and amenities ==
=== Hiking trails ===
Wyalusing has more than 14 miles (23 km) of hiking trails with varying difficulty.

- Bluff Trail—0.9 miles (1.4 km)
- Mississippi Ridge Trail—1.8 miles (2.9 km)
- Old Wagon Road Trail—0.8 miles (1.3 km)
- Sand Cave Trail—1.6 miles (2.6 km)
- Sugar Maple Nature Trail—1.5 miles (2.4 km) loop
- Turkey Hollow Trail—2.3 miles (3.7 km) loop
- Walnut Springs Trail—0.5 miles (0.80 km)
- Whitetail Meadows Trail—1.7 miles (2.7 km) or 3.1 miles (5.0 km) loop

=== Canoe trails ===
- Canoe Trail (6.0 miles (9.7 km)): Canoeists travel down stream (with the current) through the backwaters of the Upper Mississippi River National Wildlife and Fish Refuge until they reach an area of backwater that then leads back to the boat landing. At every major intersection of waterways, there are blue and white canoe trail signs. There are no signs at the end of the sloughs leading back to the canoe trail, only at intersections.

=== Fishing ===
- An accessible fishing pier is located at the boat landing.

=== Cross-country skiing ===
- During winter, there are a number of cross-country ski trails for all levels of skiing ability. Trails are groomed for classic and skate skiing.

=== Bird watching ===
Over 100 bird species have been observed in Wyalusing State Park, including yellow-throated warbler, prothonotary warbler, Bell's vireo, Henslow's sparrow, wild turkey, red-tailed hawk and red-shouldered hawk, turkey vulture, and bald eagle.

The area is listed as one of the "Wisconsin Important Bird Areas" by the Wisconsin Bird Conservation Initiative.

The Friends of Wisconsin State Parks organization presented Wyalusing State Park System the 2018 Gold Seal Award for Best State Park System for Eagle Watching.

=== Camping and group camps ===
==== Camping ====
There are two main campgrounds: Homestead and Wisconsin Ridge, offering a total of 114 campsites.

==== Hugh Harper Indoor Group Camp ====
The Hugh Harper Indoor Group Camp is the largest of only three indoor group camps in the Wisconsin State Park system. It has four dorm buildings (two are fully accessible) that can house up to 27 people each. There are two bathrooms in each dorm that have showers, toilets and sinks.

== Astronomy center ==
The Lawrence L. Huser Astronomy Center is located inside the park. It is one of only two astronomy observatories located in Wisconsin state parks and features a 16-inch telescope. Groundbreaking for the Center took place in October 1999 and it was dedicated on June 8, 2003. It is named for Lawrence Huser, a park ranger who worked at Wyalusing for 30 years, beginning in 1952.

The Center and observatory are run by the Starsplitters, a local nonprofit group that conducts free seasonal astronomy programs at the Center.

== Passenger pigeon monument ==
In 1947, the Wisconsin Society for Ornithology erected a monument to the now-extinct passenger pigeon in Wyalusing State Park. It is the only monument in the United States dedicated to the passenger pigeon. The inscription on the monument, drafted by ornithologist Arlie W. Schorger, reads: "Dedicated to the last Wisconsin Passenger Pigeon shot at Babcock, Sept. 1899. This species became extinct through the avarice and thoughtlessness of man."

Aldo Leopold wrote the essay "On a Monument to the Pigeon" on the occasion of the dedication of the monument in 1947. A version of this essay appeared in his book A Sand County Almanac.

The monument was restored and rededicated in 2014, in observance of the centenary of the pigeon's extinction. At the rededication ceremony, Stanley Temple, Beers-Bascom Professor Emeritus in Conservation at the University of Wisconsin–Madison and Senior Fellow at the Aldo Leopold Foundation, delivered a keynote speech.

== Gallery ==
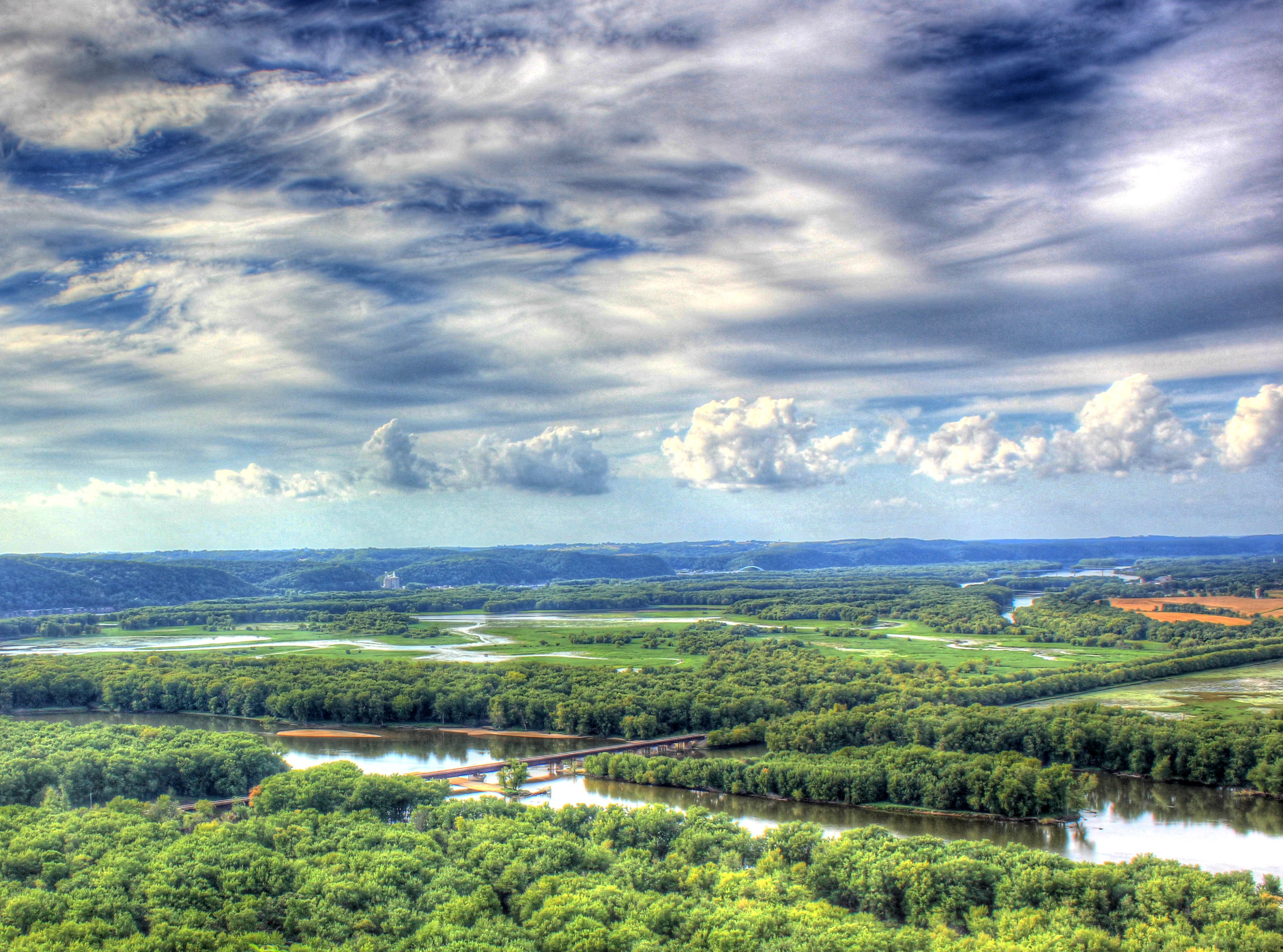
View of the Mississippi River valley at the confluence of the Wisconsin River from Wyalusing State Park

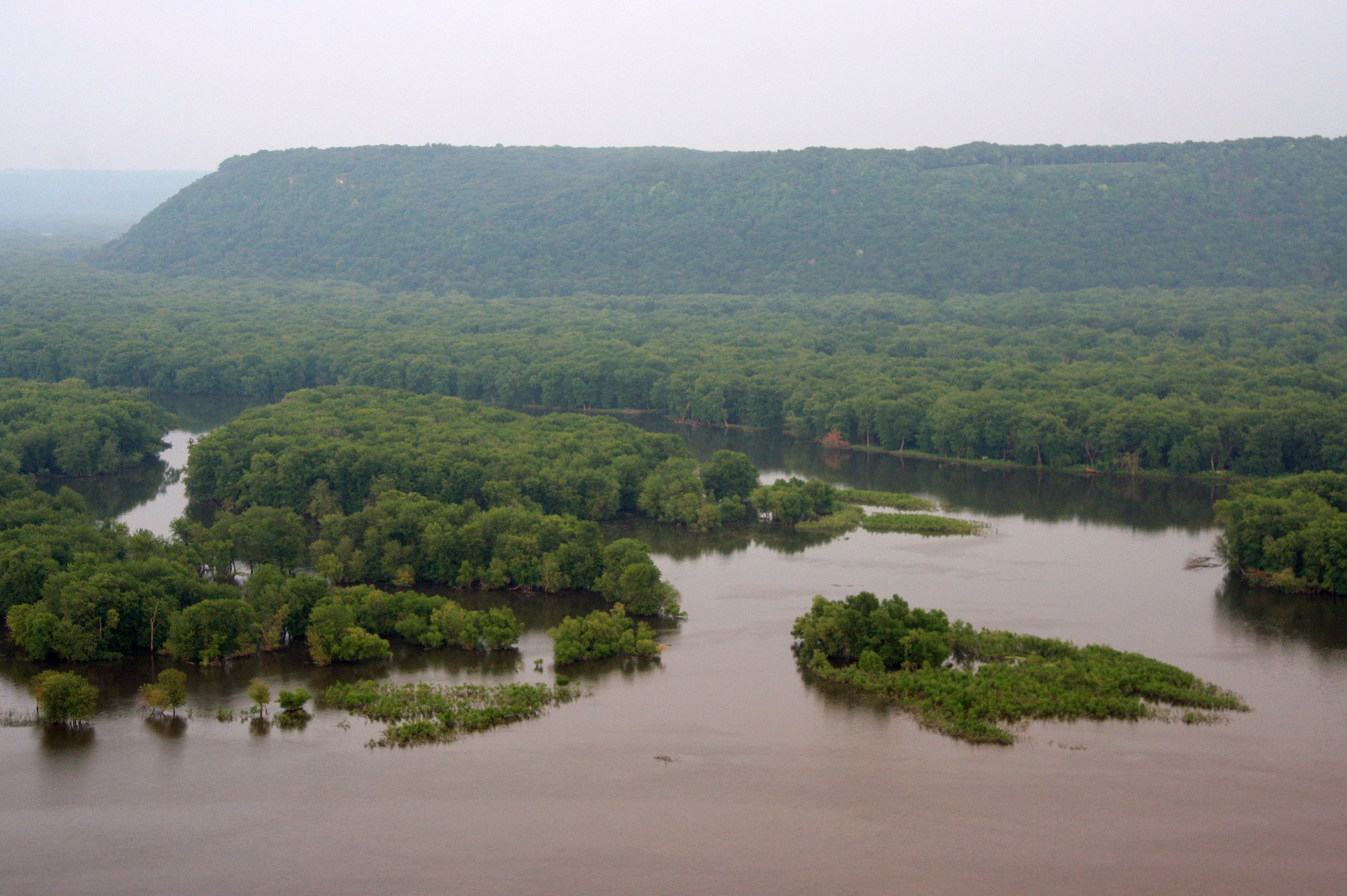
Wyalusing State Park seen from the west

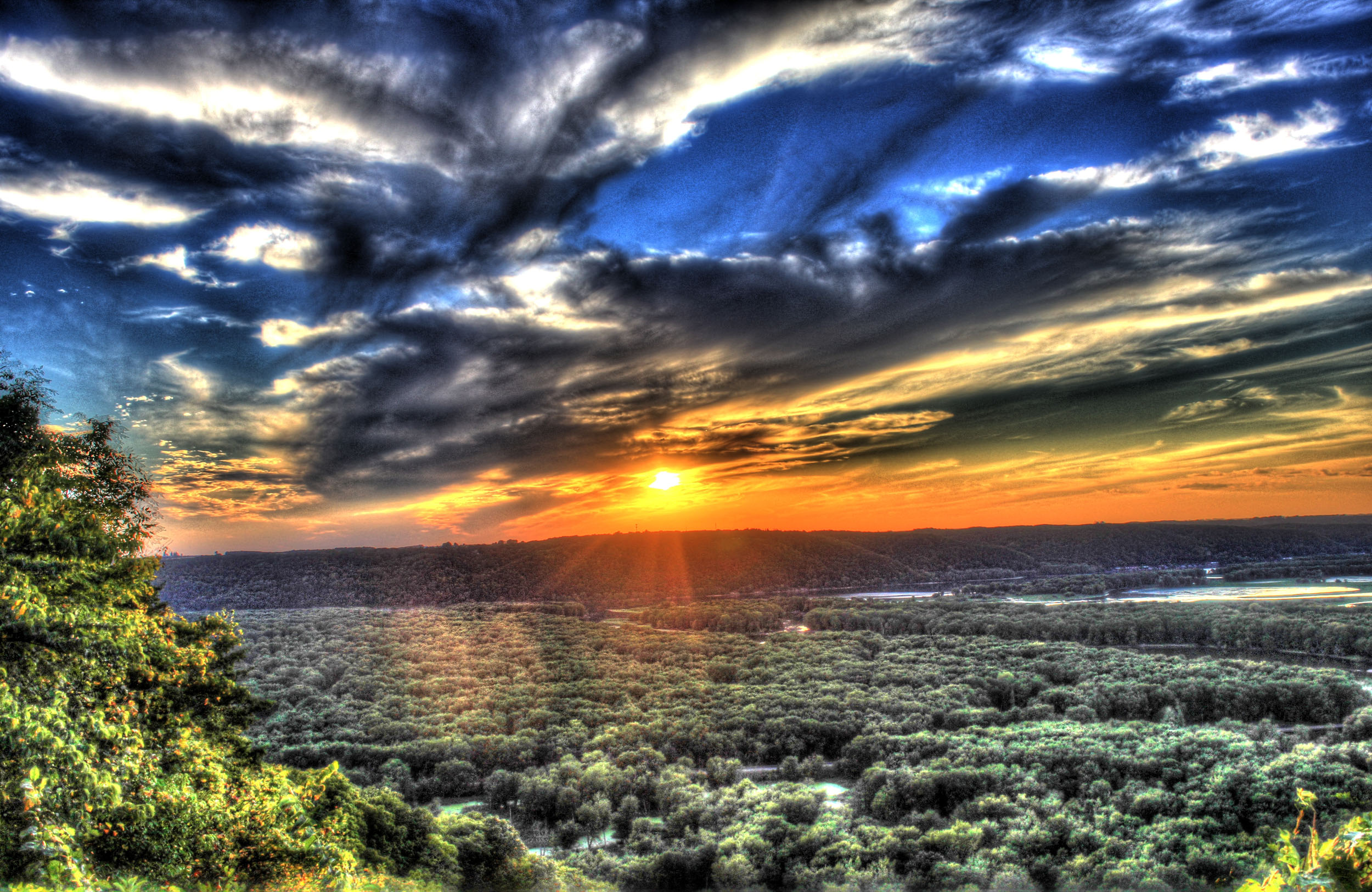
Wyalusing State Park sunset
