= Robert Glenn (Wisconsin state senator) =

American politician (1858–1915)

Robert Glenn (November 30, 1858 – August 26, 1915) was a farmer and local politician from Wyalusing, Wisconsin, who served one term as a Republican member of the Wisconsin State Senate.

== Background ==
Glenn was born on November 30, 1858, on the family farm in Wyalusing. He attended public school and received some private tutoring. Except for four years in the lumbering and grain business, he spent most of his life in farming and livestock raising. He was the son of Robert Glenn, Sr. who served in the 1860s and 1870s in the Wisconsin State Assembly. He married Harriet Brodt November 13, 1881.

== Career ==
Glenn was sheriff of Grant County, Wisconsin, for two years. and a member of the Grant County board of supervisors for several terms. He was elected to the Senate in 1912, with 7,606 votes to 5,920 for Democrat R. A. Watkins and 544 for Prohibitionist A. B. Williams, to represent the 16th District (Grant, Crawford and Richland counties). (The incumbent, fellow Republican John J. Blaine, was not a candidate.) His legislative biography stated, "His special life work has been the conservation and preservation of state park lands at the confluence of the Wisconsin and Mississippi rivers." He was assigned to the standing committee on corporations.

== Death and legacy ==
He died of pernicious anemia at his home in Wyalusing on August 26, 1915. He was survived by his wife Harriet and five children. His seat would be filled by another Republican, Henry E. Roethe, at the 1916 election.

In 1917, a large tract of land originally belonging to Glenn overlooking the confluence of the Wisconsin and Mississippi rivers became a state park, first named Nelson Dewey State Park and now called Wyalusing State Park.
