= Sir Philip Wodehouse, 1st Baronet =

Member of the Parliament of England

Sir Philip Wodehouse, 1st Baronet (died 30 October 1623), was an English baronet, soldier, and member of parliament.

Wodehouse was the son of Roger Woodhouse, of Kimberley, Norfolk, and Mary Corbet, daughter of John Corbet. Wodehouse was educated at Trinity College, Cambridge, and trained in the law at Lincoln's Inn.

Wodehouse sat as Member of Parliament for Castle Rising from 1586 to 1587. He was knighted in 1596 for his actions during the capture of Cádiz, and in 1611 he was created a Baronet, of Wilberhall in the County of Norfolk. He was appointed a justice of the peace for Norfolk from around 1591 and High Sheriff of Norfolk for 1594–1595. He was commissioner of musters for 1598 and Custos rotulorum in 1617.

Wodehouse married Grizell Yelverton, daughter of William Yelverton, on 22 December 1582. She was the widow of Thomas Lestrange of Hunstanton. Wodehouse died on 30 October 1623 and was succeeded in the baronetcy by his son, Thomas. Lady Wodehouse died in August 1635.

Wodehouse was an ancestor of the British humorist P. G. Wodehouse. A women's jacket in the collection of the Museum of Fine Arts, Boston, is thought to have belonged to Grizell Wodehouse.

Parliament of England
Preceded by Michael Stanhope; Richard Drake	Member of Parliament for Castle Rising; 1586–1587; With: Thomas Norris	Succeeded by Bartholomew Kemp; Richard Stubbe
Baronetage of England
New creation	Baronet of Wilberhall; 1611–1623	Succeeded by Thomas Wodehouse
