= Allwood Green =

Coordinates: 52.30°N 00.99°E

- Location within Suffolk
- OS grid reference: TM0472
- Shire county: Suffolk
- Region: East
- Country: England
- Sovereign state: United Kingdom
- Police: Suffolk
- Fire: Suffolk
- Ambulance: East of England
- UK Parliament: Waveney Valley

Allwood Green is an area in Suffolk, England. It is not a village or parish itself but was once the largest common in the county extending into five parishes; Gislingham, Finningham, Walsham-le-Willows and the two Ricklinghalls, Inferior and Superior. It is not mentioned in Domesday Book as the area would most likely have been heavily wooded virgin forest. It is mentioned in a licence of 1332 to "close a waye leading from Merssh to Aldewodegrene". Nothing now remains as it was completely enclosed under the Enclosure of Commons Act 1818. Allwood Piggeries sits on a side road off the Finningham to Rickinghall Superior road the B1113 at OS ref - TM048723.
