= Lewis Vaughan Lodge =

English footballer and cricketer

Personal information
- Full name: Lewis Vaughan Lodge
- Date of birth: 21 December 1872
- Place of birth: Aycliffe Village, County Durham, England
- Date of death: Between 21 October and 26 November 1916 (aged 43)
- Place of death: Burbage, Derbyshire, England
- Height: 5 ft 11 in (1.80 m)
- Position: Full back

Senior career*
Years	Team	Apps	(Gls)
1893–1895	Cambridge University	?	(?)
1894–1898	Corinthian	?	(?)
1896	Small Heath	1	(0)
?	Newbury Town	?	(?)
?	Durham Town	?	(?)

International career
1894–1896	England	5	(0)
- Cricket career
Personal information
- Batting: Right-handed
- Bowling: Unknown
- Relatives: Charlie Adamson (nephew)
Domestic team information
- Years: Team
- 1900: Hampshire
- 1902: Durham
Career statistics
Competition	First-class
Matches	3
Runs scored	6
Batting average	1.50
100s/50s	–/–
Top score	4
Balls bowled	12
Wickets	0
Bowling average	–
5 wickets in innings	–
10 wickets in match	–
Best bowling	–
Catches/stumpings	–/–
- Source: Lewis Vaughan Lodge at Cricinfo
- * Club domestic league appearances and goals

Lewis Vaughan Lodge (21 December 1872 – died: between 21 October and 26 November 1916) was an English sportsman who played international football for England and first-class cricket for Hampshire.

== Early life and sporting career ==
Lodge was born in County Durham at Newton Aycliffe in December 1872; his parents were both Welsh, with his father, John, being the vicar of Haverton Hill. His nephew was the rugby union international and cricketer Charlie Adamson. He was educated at Durham School, before matriculating to Magdalene College, Cambridge. At Cambridge, he played football as a left- or right-back for Cambridge University and gained his blue in 1893, 1894 and 1895, when he played against Oxford University. He captained Cambridge in 1895. At Cambridge, he played international football for England, making his debut in a 5–1 victory over Wales in the 1893–94 British Home Championship. He played against Wales and Scotland in the 1894–95 British Home Championship, and in 1896 he was a member of the England side which beat Ireland, before earning his fifth and final cap in a loss to Scotland later that year. He may or may not have captained England in their 1896 encounter with Ireland; primary sources give the captaincy to either Gilbert Smith, George Raikes or Lodge.

Besides playing at club level for Cambridge University, he also played for the Corinthians. In 1896, he was persuaded by William Foster (father of the cricketer Frank Foster) to play for Small Heath F.C., making one appearance against Blackburn Rovers at Coventry Road in the First Division of the Football League. His performance in the match was later described by the Birmingham Daily Post as "sensational". To their disappointment, his teaching commitments as an assistant-master at Horris Hill School in Newbury restricted him to just this single appearance. During the 1897–98 season, a severe knee injury restricted his ability to play, but he would later play for Newbury Town and Durham Town. He was described in the book Birmingham City: A Complete Record as being "a powerfully-built back of the old school brigade", and it was noted that he was reliable both at kicking the ball and at tackling.

In addition to playing football, Lodge also played cricket to a high-level. Lodge played first-class cricket for Hampshire in the 1900 County Championship, making three appearances against Kent, Derbyshire, and Leicestershire. He later played for Durham in the 1902 Minor Counties Championship, making three appearances

== Disappearance and death ==
In his final year, Lodge's health declined. Having suffered a mental breakdown in August 1916, he spent the final weeks before his disappearance convalescing in a nursing home in Buxton, Derbyshire. Lodge subsequently managed to escape from the nursing home and was declared missing on 2 October 1916. He was later found drowned in a pond at Burbage on 26 November 1916. An inquest returned a verdict of suicide, though it was noted by the jury that his mental state made him unaccountable for his actions.
