= Botesdale =

Village in Suffolk, England

Coordinates: 52.333°N 1.017°E

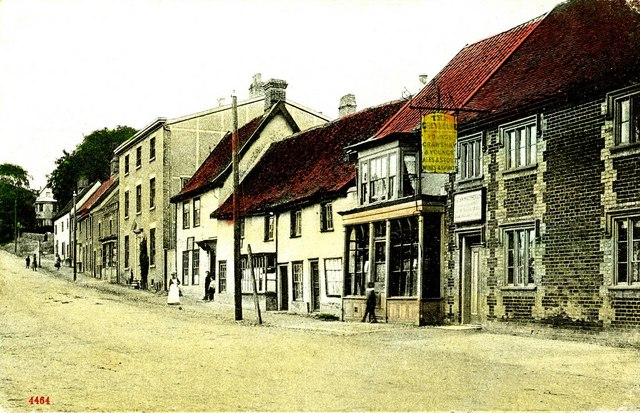
- The Market Square, Botesdale

- Location within Suffolk
- Interactive map of Botesdale
- Population: 905 (2011 census)
- District: Mid Suffolk
- Shire county: Suffolk
- Region: East
- Country: England
- Sovereign state: United Kingdom
- Post town: DISS
- Postcode district: IP22
- Dialling code: 01379
- UK Parliament: Waveney Valley

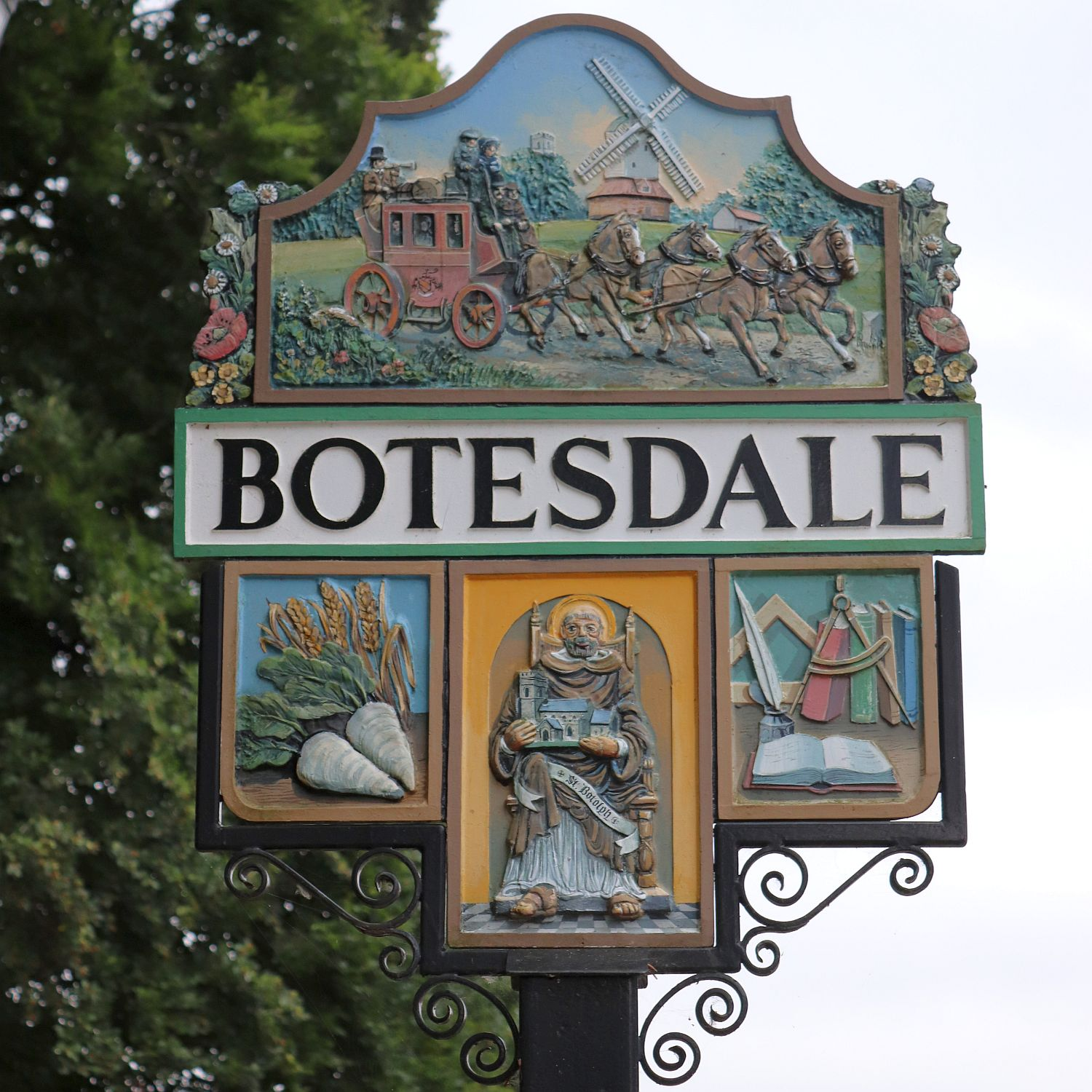
Botesdale Village Sign

Botesdale is a village and civil parish in the Mid Suffolk district of the English county of Suffolk. The village is about 6 miles (10 km) south west of Diss, 25 miles (40 km) south of Norwich and 16 miles (26 km) north east of Bury St Edmunds. The village of Rickinghall merges with Botesdale along the B1113 road, locally known as simply: ‘The Street’. Their connection creates the appearance of a single built-up residential area and the boundary between the two is difficult to identify.

Bottelmsdale may be an older variation of the name, seen in 1381.

== Culture and community ==
The village retains some local services, including shops and public houses. The Bell Inn (in Rickinghall) began life as a coaching stop for people en route through the village in the 17th and 18th centuries – it was a popular stop due to its extensive stabling for large draught horses.

Botesdale Health Centre was established in 1972, and St Botolph's Primary School was opened in 1994 after the closure of two Victorian schools – Rickinghall CofE Primary School and Redgrave and Botesdale CofE Primary School – which served the villages of Botesdale, Hinderclay, Redgrave and Rickinghall for over a century. The school now teaches over 200 pupils, from part-time Nursery pupils to Year 6 classes. Most students transfer to Hartismere High School in Eye at age 11.

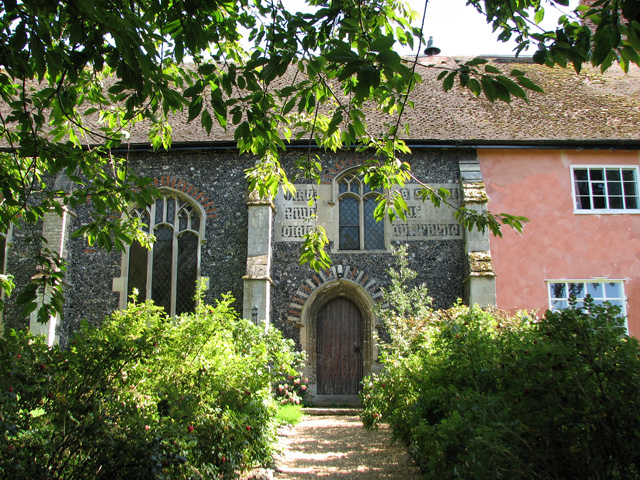
St Botolph's chapel

St Botolph's church was built in the late 15th century as a chantry chapel. When chantry chapels were abolished in the 1540s it became a school and a house was added on for the schoolmaster. In 1884, it was restored to use as a chapel of ease to Redgrave. It is a grade II* listed building

== Transport ==
The B1113 road runs through Botesdale. In the 17th and 18th centuries, this used to be a busy roadway for travellers from Great Yarmouth to Bury St Edmunds, and on further to London. The A143 now bypasses the village. Before the opening of the bypass in 1995, traffic through the village was some 7,500 vehicles per day.

Botesdale is served by Simonds of Botesdale Ltd's Country Link bus service. National Rail stations are accessible from Diss and Bury St Edmunds.

== Notable residents ==
The village's most famous resident was the actress Deborah Kerr, who died there on 16 October 2007. Another notable resident was the artist and theatrical designer Audrey Cruddas, who lived at Bank House during the 1960s and '70s. Elizabeth Craig, the cookery writer, lived in St Catherine's, one of the oldest houses in the village, from the 1960s onwards, and wrote an article, 'Footsteps in the Grass', in East Anglia Monthly, documenting the house's history. Newman Knowlys, the Recorder of London in the early 19th century, was educated in the village.
