= Robert Glenn Sr. =

American politician (1813–1887)

Robert Glenn

Member of the Wisconsin State Assembly from the Grant 4th district
- In office January 5, 1874 – January 4, 1875
- Preceded by: Christopher Hutchinson
- Succeeded by: Delos Abrams

Member of the Wisconsin State Assembly from the Grant 5th district
- In office January 2, 1865 – January 1, 1866
- Preceded by: Wood R. Beach
- Succeeded by: Alvery A. Bennett
- In office January 5, 1863 – January 4, 1864
- Preceded by: Samuel Newick
- Succeeded by: Wood R. Beach

Personal details
- Born: September 10, 1813 Philadelphia, Pennsylvania, U.S.
- Died: August 10, 1887 (aged 73)
- Party: Republican
- Children: at least 2

Robert Glenn, Sr. (September 10, 1813 – August 10, 1887) was a pioneer farmer and politician from Wyalusing, Wisconsin, who spent three terms (1863, 1865, and 1874) as a member of the Wisconsin State Assembly.

== Background ==
Glenn was born September 10, 1813, in what was described in 1874 as "within the present limits of the city of Philadelphia...". He attended public schools, and became a farmer. He moved to Wisconsin in 1840, and settled in the lead mines near Potosi. He moved to Wyalusing in 1850, where he was a merchant and sold produce until 1860, when he returned to farming. He is credited with naming the village "Wyalusing" after Wyalusing, Pennsylvania, because of a perceived resemblance.

== Public office ==
As early as 1840-43, he was a "judge of the precinct" (apparently equivalent to a justice of the peace) for the mining camp precinct in the Town of Harrison called "Big Platte", then "Red Dog". He would hold various offices in the Town of Wyalusing, including Supervisor (equivalent to city council member) in 1854-59, assessor in 1860, treasurer in 1862 and 1862–70, supervisor again 1863-64, 1870–74, 1878–79, 1882, 1884, 1887, and 1897.

He was first elected to the Assembly in 1862 (as a Republican) from the 5th Grant County assembly district (the Towns of Cassville, Beetown, Glen Haven, Tafton, Little Grant, Wyalusing, and Patch Grove), to succeed fellow Republican Samuel Newick. He was assigned to the standing committee on agriculture and manufactures. He was replaced for the 1864 session by Wood R. Beach, who was elected on the National Union ticket.

In 1864, he was re-elected to his old seat for the 18th Wisconsin Legislature, running this time on the National Union ticket (as did all Wisconsin Republicans of that era). He was put on the committee on charitable and benevolent institutions, and on enrolled bills. He did not return for the next session, being succeeded by Alvery A. Bennett, also running on the National Union ticket.

He was postmaster of the Wyalusing post office for some time in the 1860s.

He was elected to the county board of supervisors for 1870 and 1871, and would return in 1877-79 and 1884. In 1872 he was appointed one of the county's "Commissioners of the Insane" for 1873.

In 1873, Glenn returned to the Assembly as a Republican from what was now the 4th Grant County district, with 596 votes to 507 for Jared Warner, who had last served in the Assembly in 1861 as a Republican, but was running on the Reform Party ticket. Republican incumbent Christopher Hutchinson was not a candidate. Glenn was assigned to the committee on roads and bridges. He was not a candidate for reelection in 1874, and was succeeded by fellow Republican Delos Abrams.

== Personal life ==
Glenn was for many years an adherent ("receiver") of the teachings of the Swedenborgian Church of North America. Glenn died on August 10, 1887, after a gradual decline in health.
