= Rickinghall =

Village in Suffolk, England

Coordinates: 52.333°N 1°E

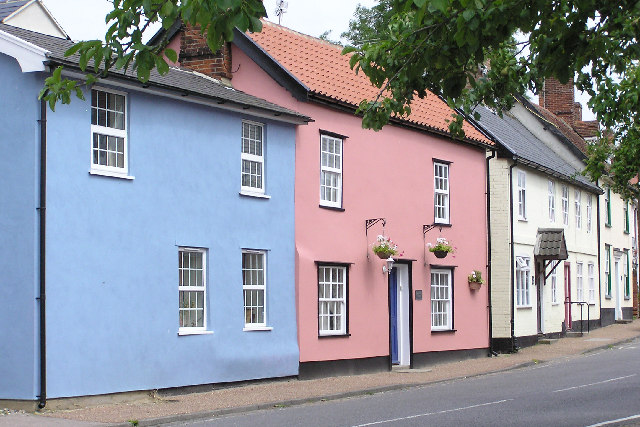
- The Street

- Location within Suffolk
- District: Mid Suffolk
- Shire county: Suffolk
- Region: East
- Country: England
- Sovereign state: United Kingdom
- Post town: Diss
- Postcode district: IP22
- Dialling code: 01379

Rickinghall is a village in the Mid Suffolk district of Suffolk, England. The village is split between two parishes, Rickinghall Inferior and Rickinghall Superior, which join with Botesdale to make a single built-up area.

There used to be thirteen pubs in the two villages, but now only The Bell Inn (Rickinghall) and The Greyhound (Botesdale) remain. The White Horse was converted to private accommodation in November 2016.

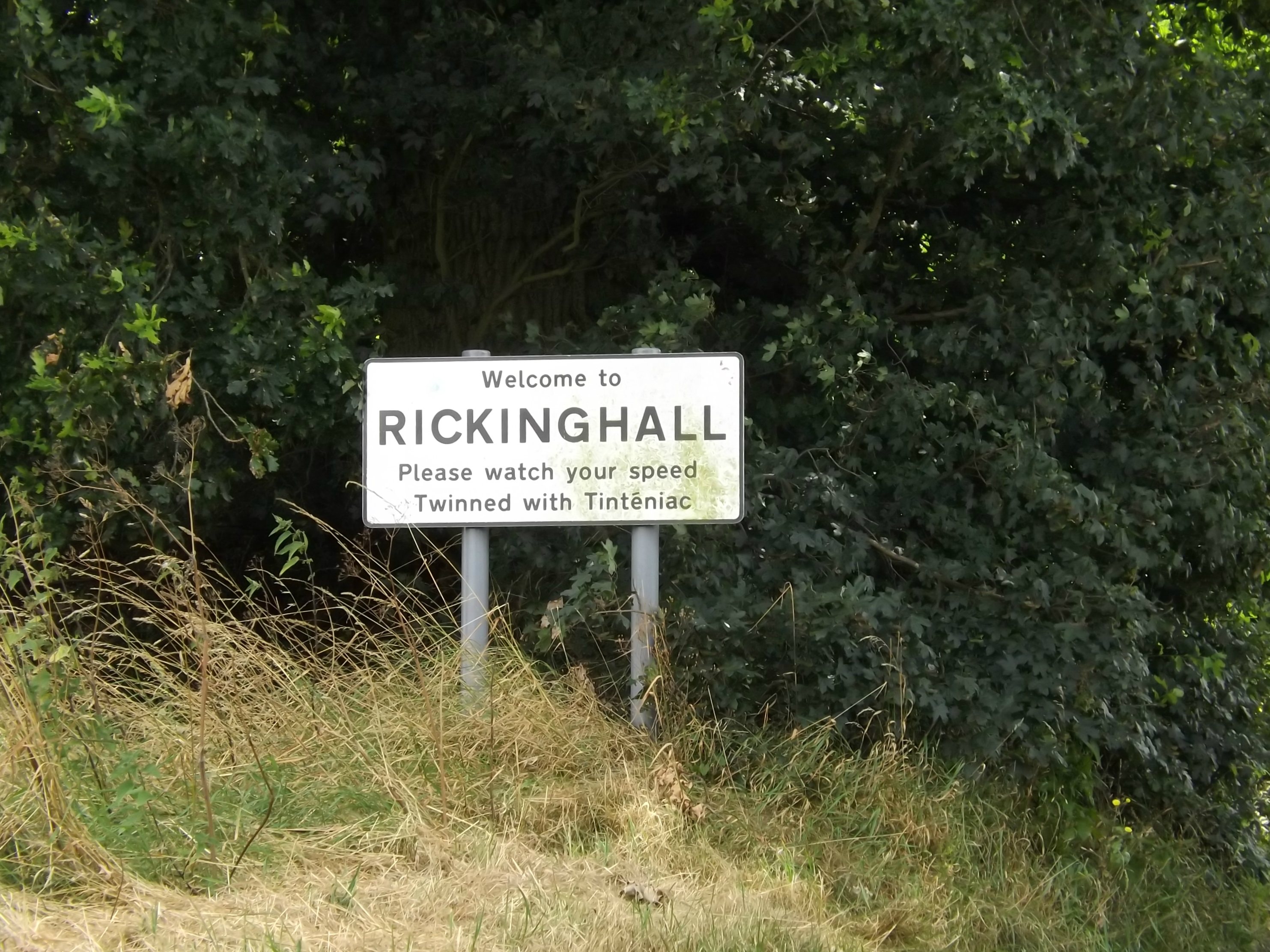
Rickinghall sign

The adjoining village of Botesdale has one school, St Botolph's CEVCP, which serves Rickinghall, Botesdale, Redgrave and other local villages. Children from this school generally attend the Hartismere High School in Eye from the age of eleven. The Botesdale After School Club operates after school hours at Botesdale village hall which also houses the Botesdale and Rickinghall pre-school from 9.00 - 3.00.

The villages of Rickinghall and Botesdale are serviced with a Co-op local store, Chinese takeaway, fish and chip shop, estate agent and several hairdressers amongst others. The Post Office with News closed in autumn 2016. It also has a village hall, an adjoining children's play area and multi use games area home to East Anglia Pickball and Rickinghall Tennis Club.

== Notable people ==
Rickinghall was the birthplace of Sir Mackenzie Bowell, Prime Minister of Canada from 1894 to 1896, as well as the life-long home of Basil Brown, the amateur archaeologist who was instrumental in discovering and excavating the Sutton Hoo Anglo Saxon Ship Burial and associated treasure in 1939.
