= Rickinghall Superior =

Civil parish in Suffolk, United Kingdom

Coordinates: 52.325°N 1.003°E

Rickinghall Superior is a civil parish in the Mid Suffolk district of Suffolk, England. It covers the eastern part of the village of Rickinghall, and also the hamlets of Candle Street and Allwood Green. The estimated population of this civil parish in 2020 was 706.

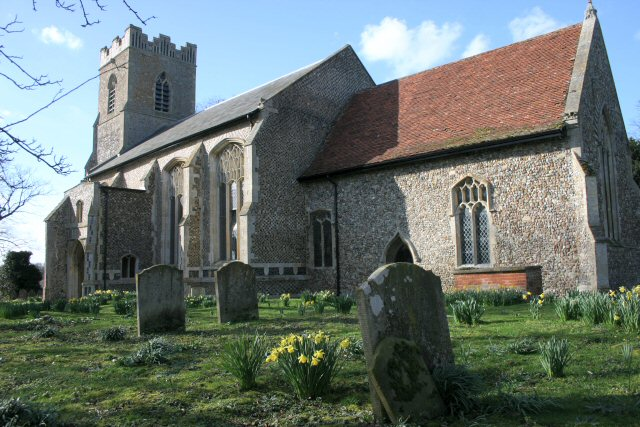
Church of St Mary

== Notable residents ==
Mary Coulcher the philanthropist was born here in 1852 and Basil Brown (1888–1977) the noted archeologist lived in Rickinghall for much of his adult life.

== See also ==
- St Mary's Church, Rickinghall Superior
