= Little Grant, Wisconsin =

- Town
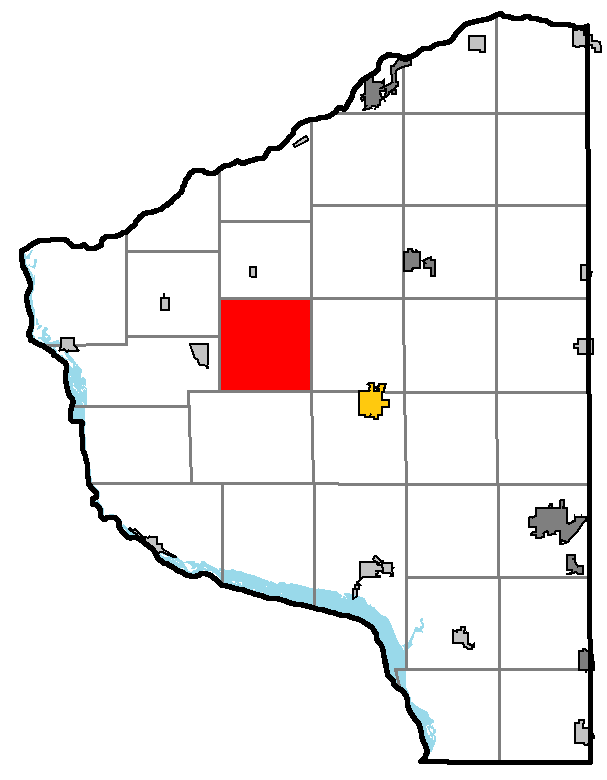
- Location of Little Grant in Grant County, Wisconsin

- Location of Grant County, Wisconsin
- Coordinates: 42°54′14″N 90°50′21″W
- Country: United States
- State: Wisconsin
- County: Grant

Area
  - Total: 36.0 sq mi (93.3 km^{2})
  - Land: 36.0 sq mi (93.3 km^{2})
  - Water: 0 sq mi (0.0 km^{2})
- Elevation: 932 ft (284 m)

Population (2020)
  - Total: 314
  - Density: 8.72/sq mi (3.37/km^{2})
- Time zone: UTC-6 (Central (CST))
  - Summer (DST): UTC-5 (CDT)
- Area code: 608
- FIPS code: 55-45025
- GNIS feature ID: 1583583

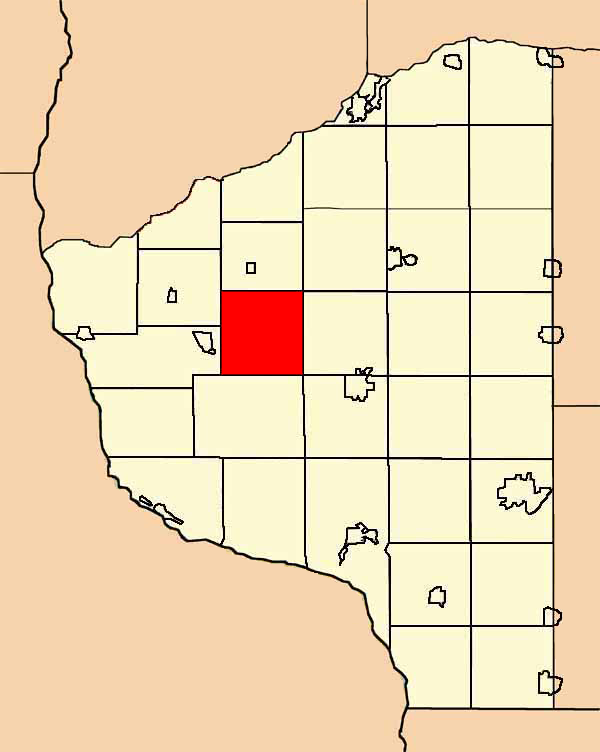
Town of Little Grant, Grant County, Wisconsin

Little Grant is a town in Grant County, Wisconsin, United States. The population was 314 at the 2020 census.

== Geography ==
According to the United States Census Bureau, the town has a total area of 36.0 square miles (93.3 km^{2}), all land.

== Demographics ==
At the 2000 census there were 257 people, 93 households, and 70 families living in the town. The population density was 7.1 people per square mile (2.8/km^{2}). There were 99 housing units at an average density of 2.7 per square mile (1.1/km^{2}). The racial makeup of the town was 99.22% White, 0.39% Native American, and 0.39% from two or more races. Of the 93 households 39.8% had children under the age of 18 living with them, 69.9% were married couples living together, 3.2% had a female householder with no husband present, and 23.7% were non-families. 16.1% of households were one person and 5.4% were one person aged 65 or older. The average household size was 2.76 and the average family size was 3.15.

The age distribution was 27.2% under the age of 18, 10.1% from 18 to 24, 30.0% from 25 to 44, 23.3% from 45 to 64, and 9.3% 65 or older. The median age was 36 years. For every 100 females, there were 105.6 males. For every 100 females age 18 and over, there were 105.5 males.

The median household income was $35,833 and the median family income was $40,417. Males had a median income of $24,375 versus $21,806 for females. The per capita income for the town was $16,239. About 9.1% of families and 12.9% of the population were below the poverty line, including 21.2% of those under the age of 18 and none of those 65 or over.
