= Carleton Forehoe =

Village in Norfolk, England

Coordinates: 52.607°N 1.087°E

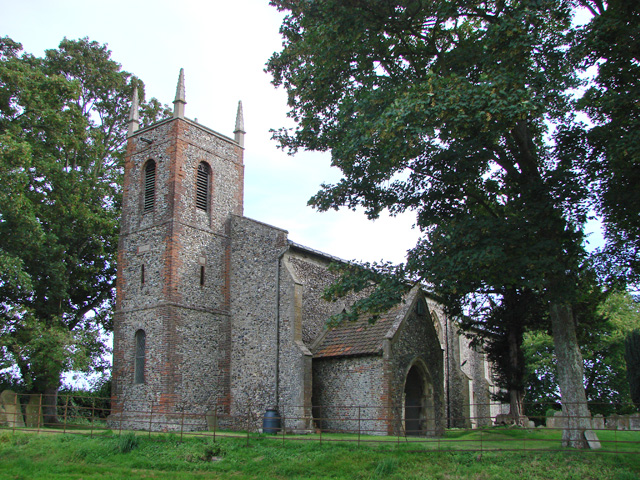
- St Mary's church

- Location within Norfolk
- Civil parish: Kimberley and Carleton Forehoe
- District: South Norfolk
- Shire county: Norfolk
- Region: East
- Country: England
- Sovereign state: United Kingdom
- Post town: NORWICH
- Postcode district: NR9
- Dialling code: 01953
- Police: Norfolk
- Fire: Norfolk
- Ambulance: East of England
- UK Parliament: Mid Norfolk

Carleton Forehoe is a former civil parish, now in the parish of Kimberley and Carleton Forehoe, in the South Norfolk district of the English county of Norfolk. It is 3 miles (4.8 km) north-west of Wymondham and 9 miles (14 km) west of Norwich. The River Tiffey, a tributary of the River Yare, formed the southern parish boundary.

== History ==
The name of the parish is of Anglo-Saxon and Scandinavian origin, with Carleton meaning "farmstead or estate of the freemen or peasants". Forehoe was added during the medieval period and references four barrows from the Bronze Age in the parish called the Forehoe Hills. The barrows were used as a meeting place for Forehoe Hundred, one of the Hundreds of Norfolk, during the medieval period. Along with some evidence of tools from prehistoric, Mesolithic, and Neolithic times, the barrows represent the early habitation of the area.

During the Saxon period there is evidence of more settlement, and in the Domesday Book of 1086 the parish was recorded as Carletuna, a settlement of 40 households and the principal village in the hundred of Forehoe. The land of the village was divided between William the Conqueror, Alan of Brittany and St Benet's Abbey.

A moated site at Gelham's Wood to the south of the church was the site of the Domesday manor belonging to St Benet’s Abbey. It later belonged to the Gelham family and in 1521 was sold to the Wodehouse family. To the east of the church, there is evidence of a shrunken medieval village, with a number of earthworks and pottery finds indicating that a settlement larger than the modern cluster of houses existed.

In 1815, Carleton Bridge was built across the River Tiffey. It is a Grade-II listed structure and is complete with the crest of the Wodehouse family.

In 1931 the parish had a population of 123. On 1 April 1935 the parish was abolished and merged with Kimberley.

== St. Mary's Church ==
Carleton Forehoe's parish church is dedicated to Saint Mary and dates from the 15th century, although it is likely that the current building is on the same site as an earlier church. The tower dates from 1713 and contains a medieval bell frame; it is built of flint and red brick, a rare combination in Norfolk. The church was restored in 1875.
