= Villanelle (disambiguation) =

A villanelle is a nineteen-line poetic form consisting of five tercets followed by a quatrain.

Villanelle may also refer to:

== Fiction ==
- Villanelle (character), a fictional assassin in BBC America's Killing Eve and in related Luke Jennings novels
  - "La Villanelle", a perfume in the Killing Eve episode "Sorry Baby"
  - Codename Villanelle, a 2018 novel by British author Luke Jennings

== Music ==
- Villanelle (Poulenc), 1934 chamber music by Francis Poulenc
- "Villanelle", a 1893 song by Eva Dell'Acqua

== See also ==
- Killing Eve: No Tomorrow, a 2019 fictional thriller novel sequel to Codename Villanelle by Luke Jennings
- Theocritus: a villanelle, a poem by Oscar Wilde
- Villanella, an Italian vocal music form
