= Golden Globe Award for Best Actress – Television Series Drama =

Award presented annually by the Hollywood Foreign Press Association

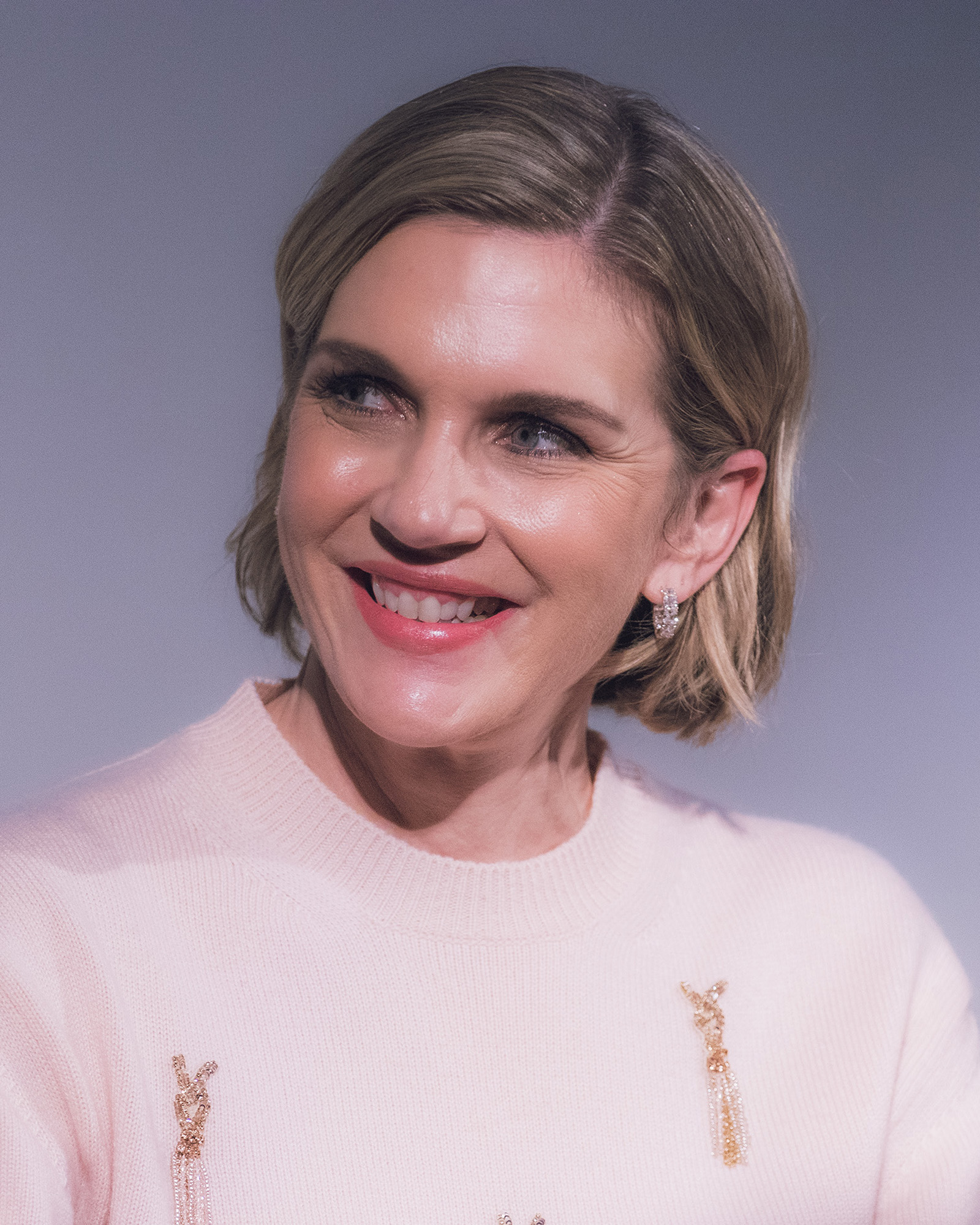
- The 2025 recipient: Rhea Seehorn
- Awarded for: Best Performance by an Actress in a Television Series – Drama
- Country: United States
- Presented by: Hollywood Foreign Press Association
- First award: March 5, 1962
- Currently held by: Rhea Seehorn - Pluribus

Highlights
- Most awards: Angela Lansbury (4)
- Most nominations: Angela Lansbury (10)
- Website: goldenglobes.org

The Golden Globe Award for Best Actress – Television Series Drama is a Golden Globe Award presented annually by the Hollywood Foreign Press Association (HFPA). The award honors the best performance by an actress in a drama television series.

It was first awarded at the 19th Golden Globe Awards on March 5, 1962, under the title Best TV Star – Female, encompassing performances in comedy and drama television series, to Pauline Frederick. The nominees for the award announced annually starting in 1963. In 1969, the award was split into the drama and comedy categories, presented under the new title Best TV Actress – Drama and in 1980 under its current title.

Since its inception, the award has been given to 50 actresses. Angela Lansbury has won the most awards in this category, winning four times, and received ten nominations for the awards, the most in the category; all of her wins were for the series Murder, She Wrote, which therefore holds the record for series with the most wins in the category. The record for series with the most different actresses winning the award is held by The Crown, for which three actors each won the award once: Claire Foy, Olivia Colman, and Emma Corrin.

== Winners and nominees ==
Listed below are the winners of the award for each year, as well as the other nominees.

Key	Meaning
‡	Indicates the winning actress.

=== 1960s ===
Year	Actor	Role	Program	Network	Ref
Best TV Star – Female
1961 (19th)
1961 (19th)	Pauline Frederick ‡				
1962 (20th)
1962 (20th)	Donna Reed ‡	Donna Stone	The Donna Reed Show	ABC	
1963 (21st)
1963 (21st)	Inger Stevens ‡	Katrin "Katy" Holstrum	The Farmer's Daughter	ABC	
1963 (21st)	Shirley Booth	Hazel Burke	Hazel	NBC	
1963 (21st)	Dorothy Loudon	Various Characters	The Garry Moore Show	CBS	
1963 (21st)	Carolyn Jones	Betsy / Meredith / Jane	Burke's Law	ABC	
1963 (21st)	Gloria Swanson	Venus Walsh	Burke's Law	ABC	
1964 (22nd)
1964 (22nd)	Mary Tyler Moore ‡	Laura Petrie	The Dick Van Dyke Show	CBS	
1964 (22nd)	Dorothy Malone	Constance Carson	Peyton Place	ABC	
1964 (22nd)	Yvette Mimieux	Pat Holmes	Dr. Kildare	NBC	
1964 (22nd)	Elizabeth Montgomery	Samantha Stephens	Bewitched	ABC	
1964 (22nd)	Julie Newmar	Rhoda Miller	My Living Doll	CBS	
1965 (23rd)
1965 (23rd)	Anne Francis ‡	Honey West	Honey West	ABC	
1965 (23rd)	Patty Duke	Patty Lane / Cathy Lane	The Patty Duke Show	ABC	
1965 (23rd)	Mia Farrow	Allison MacKenzie	Peyton Place	ABC	
1965 (23rd)	Dorothy Malone	Constance Carson	Peyton Place	ABC	
1965 (23rd)	Barbara Stanwyck	Victoria Barkley	The Big Valley	ABC	
1966 (24th)
1966 (24th)	Marlo Thomas ‡	Ann Marie	That Girl	ABC	
1966 (24th)	Phyllis Diller	Phyllis Pruitt	The Pruitts of Southampton	ABC	
1966 (24th)	Barbara Eden	Jeannie	I Dream of Jeannie	NBC	
1966 (24th)	Elizabeth Montgomery	Samantha Stephens	Bewitched	ABC	
1966 (24th)	Barbara Stanwyck	Victoria Barkley	The Big Valley	ABC	
1967 (25th)
1967 (25th)	Carol Burnett ‡	Various Characters	The Carol Burnett Show	CBS	
1967 (25th)	Barbara Bain	Cinnamon Carter	Mission: Impossible	CBS	
1967 (25th)	Lucille Ball	Lucy Carmichael	The Lucy Show	CBS	
1967 (25th)	Nancy Sinatra	Various characters	Movin' with Nancy	NBC	
1967 (25th)	Barbara Stanwyck	Victoria Barkley	The Big Valley	ABC	
1968 (26th)
1968 (26th)	Diahann Carroll ‡	Julia Baker	Julia	NBC	
1968 (26th)	Doris Day	Doris Martin	The Doris Day Show	CBS	
1968 (26th)	Hope Lange	Carolyn Muir	The Ghost & Mrs. Muir	NBC	
1968 (26th)	Elizabeth Montgomery	Samantha Stephens	Bewitched	ABC	
1968 (26th)	Nancy Sinatra	Various characters	The Nancy Sinatra Show	NBC	
Best TV Actress – Drama
1969 (27th)
1969 (27th)	Linda Cristal ‡	Victoria Montoya	The High Chaparral	NBC	
1969 (27th)	Amanda Blake	Miss Kitty Russell	Gunsmoke	CBS	
1969 (27th)	Peggy Lipton	Julie Barnes	The Mod Squad	ABC	
1969 (27th)	Denise Nicholas	Miss Liz McIntyre	Room 222	ABC	
1969 (27th)	Eleanor Parker	Sylvia Caldwell	Bracken's World	NBC	

=== 1970s ===
Year	Actor	Role	Program	Network	Ref
1970 (28th)
1970 (28th)	Peggy Lipton ‡	Julie Barnes	The Mod Squad	ABC	
1970 (28th)	Amanda Blake	Miss Kitty Russell	Gunsmoke	CBS	
1970 (28th)	Linda Cristal	Victoria Montoya	The High Chaparral	NBC	
1970 (28th)	Yvette Mimieux	Vannessa Smith	The Most Deadly Game	ABC	
1970 (28th)	Denise Nicholas	Miss Liz McIntyre	Room 222	ABC	
1971 (29th)
1971 (29th)	Patricia Neal ‡	Olivia Walton	The Homecoming: A Christmas Story	CBS	
1971 (29th)	Lynda Day George	Lisa Casey	Mission: Impossible	CBS	
1971 (29th)	Peggy Lipton	Julie Barnes	The Mod Squad	ABC	
1971 (29th)	Denise Nicholas	Miss Liz McIntyre	Room 222	ABC	
1971 (29th)	Susan Saint James	Sally McMillan	McMillan & Wife	NBC	
1972 (30th)
1972 (30th)	Gail Fisher ‡	Peggy Fair	Mannix	CBS	
1972 (30th)	Ellen Corby	Esther "Grandma" Walton	The Waltons	CBS	
1972 (30th)	Michael Learned	Olivia Walton	The Waltons	CBS	
1972 (30th)	Peggy Lipton	Julie Barnes	The Mod Squad	ABC	
1972 (30th)	Susan Saint James	Sally McMillan	McMillan & Wife	NBC	
1973 (31st)
1973 (31st)	Lee Remick ‡	Cassie Walters	The Blue Knight	NBC	
1973 (31st)	Michael Learned	Olivia Walton	The Waltons	CBS	
1973 (31st)	Julie London	Nurse Dixie McCall	Emergency!	NBC	
1973 (31st)	Emily McLaughlin	Nurse Jessie Brewer	General Hospital	ABC	
1973 (31st)	Susan Saint James	Sally McMillan	McMillan & Wife	NBC	
1974 (32nd)
1974 (32nd)	Angie Dickinson ‡	Sgt. Suzanne "Pepper" Anderson	Police Woman	NBC	
1974 (32nd)	Teresa Graves	Christy Love	Get Christy Love!	ABC	
1974 (32nd)	Michael Learned	Olivia Walton	The Waltons	CBS	
1974 (32nd)	Jean Marsh	Rose Buck	Upstairs, Downstairs	PBS	
1974 (32nd)	Emily McLaughlin	Nurse Jessie Brewer	General Hospital	ABC	
1974 (32nd)	Lee Meriwether	Betty Jones	Barnaby Jones	CBS	
1975 (33rd)
1975 (33rd)	Lee Remick ‡	Jennie Randolph Churchill	Jennie: Lady Randolph Churchill	PBS	
1975 (33rd)	Angie Dickinson	Sgt. Suzanne "Pepper" Anderson	Police Woman	NBC	
1975 (33rd)	Rosemary Harris	George Sand	Notorious Woman	PBS	
1975 (33rd)	Michael Learned	Olivia Walton	The Waltons	CBS	
1975 (33rd)	Lee Meriwether	Betty Jones	Barnaby Jones	CBS	
1976 (34th)
1976 (34th)	Susan Blakely ‡	Julie Prescott	Rich Man, Poor Man	ABC	
1976 (34th)	Angie Dickinson	Sgt. Suzanne "Pepper" Anderson	Police Woman	NBC	
1976 (34th)	Farrah Fawcett	Jill Munroe	Charlie's Angels	ABC	
1976 (34th)	Kate Jackson	Sabrina Duncan	Charlie's Angels	ABC	
1976 (34th)	Jean Marsh	Rose Buck	Upstairs, Downstairs	PBS	
1976 (34th)	Sada Thompson	Kate Lawrence	Family	ABC	
1976 (34th)	Lindsay Wagner	Jaime Sommers	The Bionic Woman	ABC	
1977 (35th)
1977 (35th)	Lesley Ann Warren ‡	Marja Fludjicki / Marianne	79 Park Avenue	NBC	
1977 (35th)	Angie Dickinson	Sgt. Suzanne "Pepper" Anderson	Police Woman	NBC	
1977 (35th)	Kate Jackson	Sabrina Duncan	Charlie's Angels	ABC	
1977 (35th)	Leslie Uggams	Kizzy	Roots	ABC	
1977 (35th)	Lindsay Wagner	Jaime Sommers	The Bionic Woman	ABC	
1978 (36th)
1978 (36th)	Rosemary Harris‡	Berta Palitz Weiss	Holocaust	NBC	
1978 (36th)	Kate Jackson	Sabrina Duncan	Charlie's Angels	ABC	
1978 (36th)	Kristy McNichol	Leticia "Buddy" Lawrence	Family	ABC	
1978 (36th)	Lee Remick	Erica Trenton	Wheels	NBC	
1978 (36th)	Sada Thompson	Kate Lawrence	Family	ABC	
1979 (37th)
1979 (37th)	Natalie Wood ‡	Karen Holmes	From Here to Eternity	NBC	
1979 (37th)	Barbara Bel Geddes	Miss Ellie Ewing	Dallas	CBS	
1979 (37th)	Kate Mulgrew	Kate Columbo	Mrs. Columbo	NBC	
1979 (37th)	Stefanie Powers	Jennifer Hart	Hart to Hart	ABC	
1979 (37th)	Sada Thompson	Kate Lawrence	Family	ABC	

=== 1980s ===
Year	Actor	Role	Program	Network	Ref
1980 (38th)
1980 (38th)	Yoko Shimada ‡	Lady Toda Buntaro	Shōgun	NBC	
1980 (38th)	Barbara Bel Geddes	Miss Ellie Ewing	Dallas	CBS	
1980 (38th)	Linda Gray	Sue Ellen Ewing	Dallas	CBS	
1980 (38th)	Melissa Gilbert	Laura Ingalls	Little House on the Prairie	NBC	
1980 (38th)	Stefanie Powers	Jennifer Hart	Hart to Hart	ABC	
1981 (39th)
1981 (39th)	Linda Evans ‡	Krystle Carrington	Dynasty	ABC	
1981 (39th)	Barbara Bel Geddes ‡	Miss Ellie Ewing	Dallas	CBS	
1981 (39th)	Joan Collins	Alexis Carrington	Dynasty	ABC	
1981 (39th)	Morgan Fairchild	Constance Weldon Carlyle	Flamingo Road	NBC	
1981 (39th)	Linda Gray	Sue Ellen Ewing	Dallas	CBS	
1981 (39th)	Stefanie Powers	Jennifer Hart	Hart to Hart	ABC	
1982 (40th)
1982 (40th)	Joan Collins ‡	Alexis Carrington	Dynasty	ABC	
1982 (40th)	Linda Evans	Krystle Carrington	Dynasty	ABC	
1982 (40th)	Stefanie Powers	Jennifer Hart	Hart to Hart	ABC	
1982 (40th)	Victoria Principal	Pamela Barnes Ewing	Dallas	CBS	
1982 (40th)	Jane Wyman	Angela Channing	Falcon Crest	CBS	
1983 (41st)
1983 (41st)	Jane Wyman ‡	Angela Channing	Falcon Crest	CBS	
1983 (41st)	Joan Collins	Alexis Carrington	Dynasty	ABC	
1983 (41st)	Tyne Daly	Mary Beth Lacey	Cagney & Lacey	CBS	
1983 (41st)	Linda Evans	Krystle Carrington	Dynasty	ABC	
1983 (41st)	Stefanie Powers	Jennifer Hart	Hart to Hart	ABC	
1984 (42nd)
1984 (42nd)	Angela Lansbury ‡	Jessica Fletcher	Murder, She Wrote	CBS	
1984 (42nd)	Joan Collins	Alexis Carrington	Dynasty	ABC	
1984 (42nd)	Tyne Daly	Mary Beth Lacey	Cagney & Lacey	CBS	
1984 (42nd)	Linda Evans	Krystle Carrington	Dynasty	ABC	
1984 (42nd)	Sharon Gless	Christine Cagney	Cagney & Lacey	CBS	
1984 (42nd)	Kate Jackson	Amanda King	Scarecrow and Mrs. King	CBS	
1985 (43rd)
1985 (43rd)	Sharon Gless ‡	Christine Cagney	Cagney & Lacey	CBS	
1985 (43rd)	Joan Collins	Alexis Carrington	Dynasty	ABC	
1985 (43rd)	Tyne Daly	Mary Beth Lacey	Cagney & Lacey	CBS	
1985 (43rd)	Linda Evans	Krystle Carrington	Dynasty	ABC	
1985 (43rd)	Angela Lansbury	Jessica Fletcher	Murder, She Wrote	CBS	
1986 (44th)
1986 (44th)	Angela Lansbury ‡	Jessica Fletcher	Murder, She Wrote	CBS	
1986 (44th)	Joan Collins	Alexis Carrington	Dynasty	ABC	
1986 (44th)	Tyne Daly	Mary Beth Lacey	Cagney & Lacey	CBS	
1986 (44th)	Sharon Gless	Christine Cagney	Cagney & Lacey	CBS	
1986 (44th)	Connie Sellecca	Christine Francis	Hotel	ABC	
1987 (45th)
1987 (45th)	Susan Dey ‡	Grace Van Owen	L.A. Law	NBC	
1987 (45th)	Jill Eikenberry	Ann Kelsey	L.A. Law	NBC	
1987 (45th)	Sharon Gless	Christine Cagney	Cagney & Lacey	CBS	
1987 (45th)	Linda Hamilton	Catherine Chandler	Beauty and the Beast	CBS	
1987 (45th)	Angela Lansbury	Jessica Fletcher	Murder, She Wrote	CBS	
1988 (46th)
1988 (46th)	Jill Eikenberry ‡	Ann Kelsey	L.A. Law	NBC	
1988 (46th)	Susan Dey	Grace Van Owen	L.A. Law	NBC	
1988 (46th)	Sharon Gless	Christine Cagney	Cagney & Lacey	CBS	
1988 (46th)	Linda Hamilton	Catherine Chandler	Beauty and the Beast	CBS	
1988 (46th)	Angela Lansbury	Jessica Fletcher	Murder, She Wrote	CBS	
1989 (47th)
1989 (47th)	Angela Lansbury ‡	Jessica Fletcher	Murder, She Wrote	CBS	
1989 (47th)	Dana Delany	Colleen McMurphy	China Beach	ABC	
1989 (47th)	Susan Dey	Grace Van Owen	L.A. Law	NBC	
1989 (47th)	Jill Eikenberry	Ann Kelsey	L.A. Law	NBC	
1989 (47th)	Mel Harris	Hope Murdoch Steadman	thirtysomething	ABC	

=== 1990s ===
Year	Actor	Role	Program	Network	Ref
1990 (48th)
1990 (48th)	Sharon Gless ‡	Fiona Rose "Rosie" O'Neill	The Trials of Rosie O'Neill	CBS	
1990 (48th)	Patricia Wettig ‡	Nancy Weston	thirtysomething	ABC	
1990 (48th)	Dana Delany	Colleen Murphy	China Beach	ABC	
1990 (48th)	Susan Dey	Grace Van Owen	L.A. Law	NBC	
1990 (48th)	Jill Eikenberry	Ann Kelsey	L.A. Law	NBC	
1990 (48th)	Angela Lansbury	Jessica Fletcher	Murder, She Wrote	CBS	
1991 (49th)
1991 (49th)	Angela Lansbury ‡	Jessica Fletcher	Murder, She Wrote	CBS	
1991 (49th)	Susan Dey	Grace Van Owen	L.A. Law	NBC	
1991 (49th)	Sharon Gless	Fiona Rose "Rosie" O'Neill	The Trials of Rosie O'Neill	CBS	
1991 (49th)	Marlee Matlin	Tess Kaufman	Reasonable Doubts	NBC	
1991 (49th)	Janine Turner	Maggie O'Connell	Northern Exposure	CBS	
1992 (50th)
1992 (50th)	Regina Taylor ‡	Lily Harper	I'll Fly Away	NBC	
1992 (50th)	Mariel Hemingway	Sydney Guilford	Civil Wars	ABC	
1992 (50th)	Angela Lansbury	Jessica Fletcher	Murder, She Wrote	CBS	
1992 (50th)	Marlee Matlin	Tess Kaufman	Reasonable Doubts	NBC	
1992 (50th)	Janine Turner	Maggie O'Connell	Northern Exposure	CBS	
1993 (51st)
1993 (51st)	Kathy Baker ‡	Jill Brock	Picket Fences	CBS	
1993 (51st)	Heather Locklear	Amanda Woodward	Melrose Place	Fox	
1993 (51st)	Jane Seymour	Dr. Michaela Quinn	Dr. Quinn, Medicine Woman	CBS	
1993 (51st)	Janine Turner	Maggie O'Connell	Northern Exposure	CBS	
1993 (51st)	Sela Ward	Theodora "Teddy" Reed	Sisters	NBC	
1994 (52nd)
1994 (52nd)	Claire Danes ‡	Angela Chase	My So-Called Life	ABC	
1994 (52nd)	Kathy Baker	Jill Brock	Picket Fences	CBS	
1994 (52nd)	Angela Lansbury	Jessica Fletcher	Murder, She Wrote	CBS	
1994 (52nd)	Heather Locklear	Amanda Woodward	Melrose Place	Fox	
1994 (52nd)	Jane Seymour	Dr. Michaela Quinn	Dr. Quinn, Medicine Woman	CBS	
1995 (53rd)
1995 (53rd)	Jane Seymour ‡	Dr. Michaela Quinn	Dr. Quinn, Medicine Woman	CBS	
1995 (53rd)	Gillian Anderson	FBI Special Agent Dana Scully	The X-Files	Fox	
1995 (53rd)	Kathy Baker	Jill Brock	Picket Fences	CBS	
1995 (53rd)	Heather Locklear	Amanda Woodward	Melrose Place	Fox	
1995 (53rd)	Sherry Stringfield	Dr. Susan Lewis	ER	NBC	
1996 (54th)
1996 (54th)	Gillian Anderson ‡	FBI Special Agent Dana Scully	The X-Files	Fox	
1996 (54th)	Christine Lahti	Dr. Kate Austen	Chicago Hope	CBS	
1996 (54th)	Heather Locklear	Amanda Woodward	Melrose Place	Fox	
1996 (54th)	Jane Seymour	Dr. Michaela Quinn	Dr. Quinn, Medicine Woman	CBS	
1996 (54th)	Sherry Stringfield	Dr. Susan Lewis	ER	NBC	
1997 (55th)
1997 (55th)	Christine Lahti ‡	Dr. Kate Austen	Chicago Hope	CBS	
1997 (55th)	Gillian Anderson	FBI Special Agent Dana Scully	The X-Files	Fox	
1997 (55th)	Kim Delaney	Diane Russell	NYPD Blue	ABC	
1997 (55th)	Roma Downey	Monica	Touched by an Angel	CBS	
1997 (55th)	Julianna Margulies	Carol Hathaway	ER	NBC	
1998 (56th)
1998 (56th)	Keri Russell ‡	Felicity Porter	Felicity	The WB	
1998 (56th)	Gillian Anderson	FBI Special Agent Dana Scully	The X-Files	Fox	
1998 (56th)	Kim Delaney	Diane Russell	NYPD Blue	ABC	
1998 (56th)	Roma Downey	Monica	Touched by an Angel	CBS	
1998 (56th)	Julianna Margulies	Carol Hathaway	ER	NBC	
1999 (57th)
1999 (57th)	Edie Falco ‡	Carmela Soprano	The Sopranos	HBO	
1999 (57th)	Lorraine Bracco	Dr. Jennifer Melfi	The Sopranos	HBO	
1999 (57th)	Amy Brenneman	Amy Gray	Judging Amy	CBS	
1999 (57th)	Julianna Margulies	Carol Hathaway	ER	NBC	
1999 (57th)	Sela Ward	Lily Manning	Once and Again	ABC	

=== 2000s ===
Year	Actor	Role	Program	Network	Ref
2000 (58th)
2000 (58th)	Sela Ward ‡	Lily Manning	Once and Again	ABC	
2000 (58th)	Jessica Alba	Max Guevara	Dark Angel	Fox	
2000 (58th)	Lorraine Bracco	Dr. Jennifer Melfi	The Sopranos	HBO	
2000 (58th)	Amy Brenneman	Amy Gray	Judging Amy	CBS	
2000 (58th)	Edie Falco	Carmela Soprano	The Sopranos	HBO	
2000 (58th)	Sarah Michelle Gellar	Buffy Summers	Buffy the Vampire Slayer	The WB	
2001 (59th)
2001 (59th)	Jennifer Garner ‡	Sydney Bristow	Alias	ABC	
2001 (59th)	Lorraine Bracco	Dr. Jennifer Melfi	The Sopranos	HBO	
2001 (59th)	Amy Brenneman	Amy Gray	Judging Amy	CBS	
2001 (59th)	Edie Falco	Carmela Soprano	The Sopranos	HBO	
2001 (59th)	Lauren Graham	Lorelai Gilmore	Gilmore Girls	The WB	
2001 (59th)	Marg Helgenberger	Catherine Willows	CSI: Crime Scene Investigation	CBS	
2001 (59th)	Sela Ward	Lily Manning	Once and Again	ABC	
2002 (60th)
2002 (60th)	Edie Falco ‡	Carmela Soprano	The Sopranos	HBO	
2002 (60th)	Jennifer Garner	Sydney Bristow	Alias	ABC	
2002 (60th)	Rachel Griffiths	Brenda Chenowith	Six Feet Under	HBO	
2002 (60th)	Marg Helgenberger	Catherine Willows	CSI: Crime Scene Investigation	CBS	
2002 (60th)	Allison Janney	C.J. Cregg	The West Wing	NBC	
2003 (61st)
2003 (61st)	Frances Conroy ‡	Ruth Fisher	Six Feet Under	HBO	
2003 (61st)	Jennifer Garner	Sydney Bristow	Alias	ABC	
2003 (61st)	Allison Janney	C.J. Cregg	The West Wing	NBC	
2003 (61st)	Joely Richardson	Julia McNamara	Nip/Tuck	FX	
2003 (61st)	Amber Tamblyn	Joan Girardi	Joan of Arcadia	CBS	
2004 (62nd)
2004 (62nd)	Mariska Hargitay ‡	Det. Olivia Benson	Law and Order: Special Victims Unit	NBC	
2004 (62nd)	Edie Falco	Carmela Soprano	The Sopranos	HBO	
2004 (62nd)	Jennifer Garner	Sydney Bristow	Alias	ABC	
2004 (62nd)	Christine Lahti	Grace McAllister	Jack & Bobby	The WB	
2004 (62nd)	Joely Richardson	Julia McNamara	Nip/Tuck	FX	
2005 (63rd)
2005 (63rd)	Geena Davis ‡	President Mackenzie Allen	Commander in Chief	ABC	
2005 (63rd)	Patricia Arquette	Allison DuBois	Medium	CBS	
2005 (63rd)	Glenn Close	Monica Rawling	The Shield	FX	
2005 (63rd)	Kyra Sedgwick	Brenda Leigh Johnson	The Closer	TNT	
2005 (63rd)	Polly Walker	Atia of the Julii	Rome	HBO	
2006 (64th)
2006 (64th)	Kyra Sedgwick ‡	Brenda Leigh Johnson	The Closer	TNT	
2006 (64th)	Patricia Arquette	Allison DuBois	Medium	CBS	
2006 (64th)	Edie Falco	Carmela Soprano	The Sopranos	HBO	
2006 (64th)	Evangeline Lilly	Kate Austen	Lost	ABC	
2006 (64th)	Ellen Pompeo	Meredith Grey	Grey's Anatomy	ABC	
2007 (65th)
2007 (65th)	Glenn Close ‡	Patty Hewes	Damages	FX	
2007 (65th)	Patricia Arquette	Allison DuBois	Medium	CBS	
2007 (65th)	Minnie Driver	Dahlia Malloy	The Riches	FX	
2007 (65th)	Edie Falco	Carmela Soprano	The Sopranos	HBO	
2007 (65th)	Sally Field	Nora Walker	Brothers & Sisters	ABC	
2007 (65th)	Holly Hunter	Grace Hanadarko	Saving Grace	TNT	
2007 (65th)	Kyra Sedgwick	Brenda Leigh Johnson	The Closer	TNT	
2008 (66th)
2008 (66th)	Anna Paquin ‡	Sookie Stackhouse	True Blood	HBO	
2008 (66th)	Sally Field	Nora Walker	Brothers & Sisters	ABC	
2008 (66th)	Mariska Hargitay	Det. Olivia Benson	Law and Order: Special Victims Unit	NBC	
2008 (66th)	January Jones	Betty Draper	Mad Men	AMC	
2008 (66th)	Kyra Sedgwick	Brenda Leigh Johnson	The Closer	TNT	
2009 (67th)
2009 (67th)	Julianna Margulies ‡	Alicia Florrick	The Good Wife	CBS	
2009 (67th)	Glenn Close	Patty Hewes	Damages	FX	
2009 (67th)	January Jones	Betty Draper	Mad Men	AMC	
2009 (67th)	Anna Paquin	Sookie Stackhouse	True Blood	HBO	
2009 (67th)	Kyra Sedgwick	Brenda Leigh Johnson	The Closer	TNT	

=== 2010s ===
Year	Actor	Role	Program	Network	Ref
2010 (68th)
2010 (68th)	Katey Sagal ‡	Gemma Teller Morrow	Sons of Anarchy	FX	
2010 (68th)	Julianna Margulies	Alicia Florrick	The Good Wife	CBS	
2010 (68th)	Elisabeth Moss	Peggy Olson	Mad Men	AMC	
2010 (68th)	Piper Perabo	Annie Walker	Covert Affairs	USA	
2010 (68th)	Kyra Sedgwick	Brenda Leigh Johnson	The Closer	TNT	
2011 (69th)
2011 (69th)	Claire Danes ‡	Carrie Mathison	Homeland	Showtime	
2011 (69th)	Mireille Enos	Sarah Linden	The Killing	AMC	
2011 (69th)	Julianna Margulies	Alicia Florrick	The Good Wife	CBS	
2011 (69th)	Madeleine Stowe	Victoria Grayson	Revenge	ABC	
2011 (69th)	Callie Thorne	Danielle "Dani" Santino	Necessary Roughness	USA	
2012 (70th)
2012 (70th)	Claire Danes ‡	Carrie Mathison	Homeland	Showtime	
2012 (70th)	Connie Britton	Rayna James	Nashville	ABC	
2012 (70th)	Glenn Close	Patty Hewes	Damages	FX	
2012 (70th)	Michelle Dockery	Mary Crawley	Downton Abbey	PBS	
2012 (70th)	Julianna Margulies	Alicia Florrick	The Good Wife	CBS	
2013 (71st)
2013 (71st)	Robin Wright ‡	Claire Underwood	House of Cards	Netflix	
2013 (71st)	Julianna Margulies	Alicia Florrick	The Good Wife	CBS	
2013 (71st)	Tatiana Maslany	Various Characters	Orphan Black	BBC America	
2013 (71st)	Taylor Schilling	Piper Chapman	Orange Is the New Black	Netflix	
2013 (71st)	Kerry Washington	Olivia Pope	Scandal	ABC	
2014 (72nd)
2014 (72nd)	Ruth Wilson ‡	Alison Lockhart	The Affair	Showtime	
2014 (72nd)	Claire Danes	Carrie Mathison	Homeland	Showtime	
2014 (72nd)	Viola Davis	Annalise Keating	How to Get Away with Murder	ABC	
2014 (72nd)	Julianna Margulies	Alicia Florrick	The Good Wife	CBS	
2014 (72nd)	Robin Wright	Claire Underwood	House of Cards	Netflix	
2015 (73rd)
2015 (73rd)	Taraji P. Henson ‡	Cookie Lyon	Empire	Fox	
2015 (73rd)	Caitríona Balfe	Claire Fraser	Outlander	Starz	
2015 (73rd)	Viola Davis	Annalise Keating	How to Get Away with Murder	ABC	
2015 (73rd)	Eva Green	Vanessa Ives	Penny Dreadful	Showtime	
2015 (73rd)	Robin Wright	Claire Underwood	House of Cards	Netflix	
2016 (74th)
2016 (74th)	Claire Foy ‡	Queen Elizabeth II	The Crown	Netflix	
2016 (74th)	Caitríona Balfe	Claire Fraser	Outlander	Starz	
2016 (74th)	Keri Russell	Elizabeth Jennings	The Americans	FX	
2016 (74th)	Winona Ryder	Joyce Byers	Stranger Things	Netflix	
2016 (74th)	Evan Rachel Wood	Dolores Abernathy	Westworld	HBO	
2017 (75th)
2017 (75th)	Elisabeth Moss ‡	June Osborne / Offred	The Handmaid's Tale	Hulu	
2017 (75th)	Caitríona Balfe	Claire Fraser	Outlander	Starz	
2017 (75th)	Claire Foy	Queen Elizabeth II	The Crown	Netflix	
2017 (75th)	Maggie Gyllenhaal	Eileen "Candy" Merrell	The Deuce	HBO	
2017 (75th)	Katherine Langford	Hannah Baker	13 Reasons Why	Netflix	
2018 (76th)
2018 (76th)	Sandra Oh ‡	Eve Polastri	Killing Eve	BBC America	
2018 (76th)	Caitríona Balfe	Claire Fraser	Outlander	Starz	
2018 (76th)	Elisabeth Moss	June Osborne / Offred	The Handmaid's Tale	Hulu	
2018 (76th)	Julia Roberts	Heidi Bergman	Homecoming	Amazon Prime Video	
2018 (76th)	Keri Russell	Elizabeth Jennings	The Americans	FX	
2019 (77th)
2019 (77th)	Olivia Colman ‡	Queen Elizabeth II	The Crown	Netflix	
2019 (77th)	Jennifer Aniston	Alex Levy	The Morning Show	Apple TV	
2019 (77th)	Jodie Comer	Oksana Astankova/Villanelle	Killing Eve	BBC America	
2019 (77th)	Nicole Kidman	Celeste Wright	Big Little Lies	HBO	
2019 (77th)	Reese Witherspoon	Bradley Jackson	The Morning Show	Apple TV	

=== 2020s ===
Year	Actor	Role	Program	Network	Ref
2020 (78th)
2020 (78th)	Emma Corrin ‡	Diana, Princess of Wales	The Crown	Netflix	
2020 (78th)	Olivia Colman	Queen Elizabeth II	The Crown	Netflix	
2020 (78th)	Jodie Comer	Oksana Astankova / Villanelle	Killing Eve	BBC America	
2020 (78th)	Laura Linney	Wendy Byrde	Ozark	Netflix	
2020 (78th)	Sarah Paulson	Nurse Mildred Ratched	Ratched	Netflix	
2021 (79th)
2021 (79th)	Michaela Jaé Rodriguez ‡	Blanca Evangelista	Pose	FX	
2021 (79th)	Uzo Aduba	Dr. Brooke Taylor	In Treatment	HBO	
2021 (79th)	Jennifer Aniston	Alex Levy	The Morning Show	Apple TV	
2021 (79th)	Christine Baranski	Diane Lockhart	The Good Fight	Paramount+	
2021 (79th)	Elisabeth Moss	June Osborne / Offred	The Handmaid's Tale	Hulu	
2022 (80th)
2022 (80th)	Zendaya ‡	Rue Bennett	Euphoria	HBO	
2022 (80th)	Emma D'Arcy	Rhaenyra Targaryen	House of the Dragon	HBO	
2022 (80th)	Laura Linney	Wendy Byrde	Ozark	Netflix	
2022 (80th)	Imelda Staunton	Queen Elizabeth II	The Crown	Netflix	
2022 (80th)	Hilary Swank	Eileen Fitzgerald	Alaska Daily	ABC	
2023 (81st)
2023 (81st)	Sarah Snook ‡	Siobhan "Shiv" Roy	Succession	HBO	
2023 (81st)	Helen Mirren	Cara Dutton	1923	Paramount+	
2023 (81st)	Bella Ramsey	Ellie	The Last of Us	HBO	
2023 (81st)	Keri Russell	Katherine "Kate" Wyler	The Diplomat	Netflix	
2023 (81st)	Imelda Staunton	Queen Elizabeth II	The Crown	Netflix	
2023 (81st)	Emma Stone	Whitney Siegel	The Curse	Showtime	
2024 (82nd)
2024 (82nd)	Anna Sawai ‡	Lady Toda Mariko	Shōgun	FX	
2024 (82nd)	Kathy Bates	Maddy Matlock / Madeline Kingston	Matlock	CBS	
2024 (82nd)	Emma D'Arcy	Queen Rhaenyra Targaryen	House of the Dragon	HBO	
2024 (82nd)	Maya Erskine	Jane Smith / Alana	Mr. & Mrs. Smith	Prime Video	
2024 (82nd)	Keira Knightley	Helen Webb	Black Doves	Netflix	
2024 (82nd)	Keri Russell	Katherine "Kate" Wyler	The Diplomat	Netflix	
2025 (83rd)
2025 (83rd)	Rhea Seehorn ‡	Carol Sturka	Pluribus	Apple TV	
2025 (83rd)	Kathy Bates	Maddy Matlock / Madeline Kingston	Matlock	CBS	
2025 (83rd)	Britt Lower	Helly R.	Severance	Apple TV	
2025 (83rd)	Helen Mirren	Maeve Harrigan	MobLand	Paramount+	
2025 (83rd)	Bella Ramsey	Ellie	The Last of Us	HBO	
2025 (83rd)	Keri Russell	Katherine "Kate" Wyler	The Diplomat	Netflix	

== Superlatives ==
Superlative	Best Actress – Television Series Drama
Actress with most awards	Angela Lansbury (4)
Actress with most nominations	Angela Lansbury (10)
Actress with most nominations without ever winning	Stefanie Powers (5)

== Actresses with multiple wins ==
4 wins

- Angela Lansbury

3 wins

- Claire Danes

2 wins

- Edie Falco
- Sharon Gless
- Lee Remick

== Series with multiple wins ==
4 wins

- Murder, She Wrote (ABC)

3 wins

- The Crown (Netflix)

2 wins

- Dynasty (ABC)
- Homeland (Showtime)
- L.A. Law (NBC)
- The Sopranos (HBO)

== Actresses with multiple nominations ==
10 nominations

- Angela Lansbury

9 nominations

- Julianna Margulies

7 nominations

- Edie Falco
- Sharon Gless

6 nominations

- Joan Collins
- Keri Russell
- Kyra Sedgwick

5 nominations

- Susan Dey
- Linda Evans
- Stefanie Powers

4 nominations

- Gillian Anderson
- Caitriona Balfe
- Glenn Close
- Tyne Daly
- Claire Danes
- Angie Dickinson
- Jill Eikenberry
- Jennifer Garner
- Kate Jackson
- Michael Learned
- Peggy Lipton
- Heather Locklear
- Elisabeth Moss
- Jane Seymour
- Sela Ward

3 nominations

- Patricia Arquette
- Kathy Baker
- Barbara Bel Geddes
- Lorraine Bracco
- Amy Brenneman
- Christine Lahti
- Elizabeth Montgomery
- Denise Nicholas
- Lee Remick
- Susan Saint James
- Sada Thompson
- Janine Turner
- Robin Wright

2 nominations

- Jennifer Aniston
- Kathy Bates
- Amanda Blake
- Olivia Colman
- Jodie Comer
- Linda Cristal
- Emma D'Arcy
- Viola Davis
- Kim Delaney
- Dana Delany
- Roma Downey
- Sally Field
- Claire Foy
- Linda Gray
- Linda Hamilton
- Mariska Hargitay
- Rosemary Harris
- Marg Helgenberger
- Allison Janney
- January Jones
- Laura Linney
- Jean Marsh
- Marlee Matlin
- Emily McLaughlin
- Lee Meriwether
- Helen Mirren
- Anna Paquin
- Bella Ramsey
- Joely Richardson
- Imelda Staunton
- Sherry Stringfield
- Lindsay Wagner
- Jane Wyman

== Series with multiple nominations ==
11 nominations

- Dynasty (ABC)

10 nominations

- Murder, She Wrote (CBS)
- The Sopranos (HBO)

9 nominations

- Cagney & Lacey (ABC)
- L.A. Law (NBC)

7 nominations

- The Crown (Netflix)

6 nominations

- The Closer (TNT)
- Dallas (CBS)
- The Good Wife (CBS)

5 nominations

- ER (NBC)
- Hart to Hart (ABC)
- The Waltons (CBS)

4 nominations

- Alias (ABC)
- Charlie's Angels (ABC)
- Dr. Quinn, Medicine Woman (CBS)
- Family (ABC)
- Melrose Place (Fox)
- The Mod Squad (ABC)
- Outlander (Starz)
- Police Woman (NBC)
- The X-Files (Fox)

3 nominations

- Bewitched (ABC)
- The Big Valley (ABC)
- Damages (FX)
- The Diplomat (Netflix)
- The Handmaid's Tale (Hulu)
- Homeland (Showtime)
- House of Cards (Netflix)
- Judging Amy (CBS)
- Killing Eve (BBC America)
- Mad Men (AMC)
- Medium (CBS)
- McMillan & Wife (NBC)
- The Morning Show (AppleTV+)
- Northern Exposure (CBS)
- Once and Again (ABC)
- Peyton Place (ABC)
- Picket Fences (CBS)
- Room 222 (ABC)

2 nominations

- The Americans (FX)
- Barnaby Jones (CBS)
- Beauty and the Beast (CBS)
- The Bionic Woman (ABC)
- Brothers & Sisters (ABC)
- Burke's Law (ABC)
- Chicago Hope (CBS)
- China Beach (CBS)
- CSI: Crime Scene Investigation (CBS)
- Falcon Crest (CBS)
- General Hospital (ABC)
- Gunsmoke (CBS)
- The High Chaparral (NBC)
- House of the Dragon (HBO)
- How to Get Away with Murder (ABC)
- The Last of Us (HBO)
- Law and Order: Special Victims Unit (NBC)
- Matlock (CBS)
- Mission: Impossible (CBS)
- Nip/Tuck (FX)
- NYPD Blue (ABC)
- Ozark (Netflix)
- Reasonable Doubts (NBC)
- Six Feet Under (HBO)
- thirtysomething (ABC)
- Touched by an Angel (CBS)
- True Blood (HBO)
- The Trials of Rosie O'Neill (CBS)
- Upstairs, Downstairs (PBS)
- The West Wing (NBC)

== Firsts ==
- Diahann Carroll became the first actress of African descent to win, when she won at the 26th Golden Globe Awards in 1969.
- Linda Cristal became the first actress of Latin American descent to win, when she won at the 27th Golden Globe Awards in 1970.
- Yoko Shimada became the first actress of Asian descent to win, when she won at the 38th Golden Globe Awards in 1981.
- Michaela Jaé Rodriguez became the first transgender actress to win, when she won at the 79th Golden Globe Awards in 2022.

== See also ==
- TCA Award for Individual Achievement in Drama
- Critics' Choice Television Award for Best Actress in a Drama Series
- Primetime Emmy Award for Outstanding Lead Actress in a Drama Series
- Screen Actors Guild Award for Outstanding Performance by a Female Actor in a Drama Series
