= Satellite Award for Best Actress – Drama =

Satellite Award for Best Actress - Drama can refer to:

- Satellite Award for Best Actress – Motion Picture or
- Satellite Award for Best Actress – Television Series Drama
