= Satellite Award for Best Actress – Television Series Drama =

Award given by International Press Academy

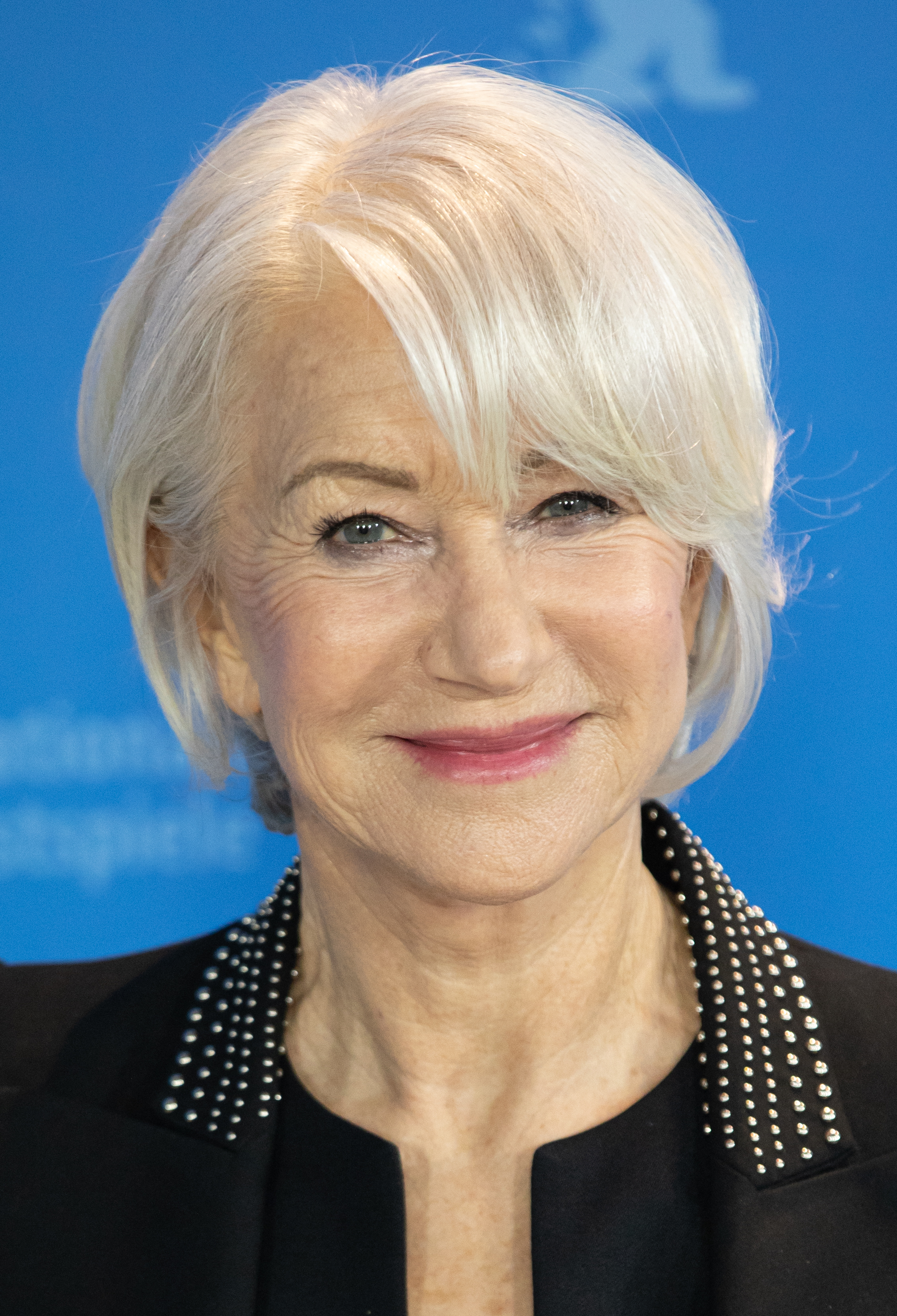
- The 2023 recipient: Helen Mirren
- Awarded for: Best Actress in a Drama Series
- Country: United States
- Presented by: International Press Academy
- First award: 1996
- Currently held by: Helen Mirren – 1923 (2023)

The Satellite Award for Best Actress in a Television Series – Drama is one of the annual Satellite Awards given by the International Press Academy.

== Winners and nominees ==
=== 1990s ===
| Year | Actor | Series | Role | Network |
|---|---|---|---|---|
| 1996 | Christine Lahti | Chicago Hope | Kathryn Austin | CBS |
| 1996 | Gillian Anderson | The X-Files | Dana Scully | Fox |
| 1996 | Kim Delaney | NYPD Blue | Diane Russell | ABC |
| 1996 | Kimberly Williams | Relativity | Isabel Lukens | ABC |
| 1996 | Julianna Margulies | ER | Carol Hathaway | NBC |
| 1997 | Kate Mulgrew | Star Trek: Voyager | Kathryn Janeway | UPN |
| 1997 | Gillian Anderson | The X-Files | Dana Scully | Fox |
| 1997 | Kim Delaney | NYPD Blue | Diane Russell | ABC |
| 1997 | Julianna Margulies | ER | Carol Hathaway | NBC |
| 1997 | Ally Walker | Profiler | Samantha "Sam" Waters | NBC |
| 1998 | Jeri Ryan | Star Trek: Voyager | Annika Hansen / Seven of Nine | UPN |
| 1998 | Gillian Anderson | The X-Files | Dana Scully | Fox |
| 1998 | Sharon Lawrence | NYPD Blue | Sylvia Costas | ABC |
| 1998 | Rita Moreno | Oz | Peter Marie Reimondo | HBO |
| 1998 | Andrea Parker | The Pretender | Catherine Elaine Parker | NBC |
| 1999 | Camryn Manheim | The Practice | Ellenor Frutt | ABC |
| 1999 | Lorraine Bracco | The Sopranos | Jennifer Melfi | HBO |
| 1999 | Edie Falco | The Sopranos | Carmela Soprano | HBO |
| 1999 | Mariska Hargitay | Law & Order: Special Victims Unit | Olivia Benson | NBC |
| 1999 | Kelli Williams | The Practice | Lindsay Dole | ABC |

=== 2000s ===
| Year | Actor | Series | Role | Network |
|---|---|---|---|---|
| 2000 | Allison Janney | The West Wing | C. J. Cregg | NBC |
| 2000 | Gillian Anderson | The X-Files | Dana Scully | Fox |
| 2000 | Tyne Daly | Judging Amy | Maxine McCarty Gray | CBS |
| 2000 | Edie Falco | The Sopranos | Carmela Soprano | HBO |
| 2000 | Sela Ward | Once and Again | Elizabeth Manning | ABC |
| 2001 | Edie Falco | The Sopranos | Carmela Soprano | HBO |
| 2001 | Amy Brenneman | Judging Amy | Amy Madison Gray | CBS |
| 2001 | Marg Helgenberger | CSI: Crime Scene Investigation | Catherine Willows | CBS |
| 2001 | Sela Ward | Once and Again | Elizabeth Manning | ABC |
| 2001 | Kim Delaney | Philly | Kathleen Maguire | ABC |
| 2002 | C. C. H. Pounder | The Shield | Claudette Wyms | FX |
| 2002 | Jennifer Garner | Alias | Sydney Bristow | ABC |
| 2002 | Sarah Michelle Gellar | Buffy the Vampire Slayer | Buffy Summers | UPN |
| 2002 | Maura Tierney | ER | Abby Lockhart | NBC |
| 2002 | Allison Janney | The West Wing | C. J. Cregg | NBC |
| 2003 | C. C. H. Pounder | The Shield | Claudette Wyms | FX |
| 2003 | Jennifer Garner | Alias | Sydney Bristow | ABC |
| 2003 | Amy Madigan | Carnivàle | Iris Crowe | HBO |
| 2003 | Ellen Muth | Dead Like Me | Georgia "George" Lass | Showtime |
| 2003 | Joely Richardson | Nip/Tuck | Julia McNamara | FX |
| 2003 | Amber Tamblyn | Joan of Arcadia | Joan Girardi | CBS |
| 2004 | Laurel Holloman | The L Word | Tina Kennard | Showtime |
| 2004 | Jennifer Garner | Alias | Sydney Bristow | ABC |
| 2004 | Evangeline Lilly | Lost | Kate Austen | ABC |
| 2004 | Joely Richardson | Nip/Tuck | Julia McNamara | FX |
| 2004 | Amber Tamblyn | Joan of Arcadia | Joan Girardi | CBS |
| 2005 | Kyra Sedgwick | The Closer | Brenda Leigh Johnson | TNT |
| 2005 | Patricia Arquette | Medium | Allison DuBois | NBC |
| 2005 | Jennifer Beals | The L Word | Bette Porter | Showtime |
| 2005 | Kristen Bell | Veronica Mars | Veronica Mars | UPN |
| 2005 | Geena Davis | Commander in Chief | Mackenzie Allen | ABC |
| 2005 | Joely Richardson | Nip/Tuck | Julia McNamara | FX |
| 2006 | Kyra Sedgwick | The Closer | Brenda Leigh Johnson | TNT |
| 2006 | Kristen Bell | Veronica Mars | Veronica Mars | UPN |
| 2006 | Emily Deschanel | Bones | Temperance "Bones" Brennan | Fox |
| 2006 | Sarah Paulson | Studio 60 on the Sunset Strip | Harriet Hayes | NBC |
| 2006 | Amanda Peet | Studio 60 on the Sunset Strip | Jordan McDeere | NBC |
| 2006 | Jeanne Tripplehorn | Big Love | Barbara Henrickson | HBO |
| 2007 | Ellen Pompeo | Grey's Anatomy | Meredith Grey | ABC |
| 2007 | Glenn Close | Damages | Patty Hewes | FX |
| 2007 | Minnie Driver | The Riches | Dahlia Malloy | FX |
| 2007 | Sally Field | Brothers and Sisters | Nora Walker | ABC |
| 2007 | Kyra Sedgwick | The Closer | Brenda Leigh Johnson | TNT |
| 2007 | Jeanne Tripplehorn | Big Love | Barbara Henrickson | HBO |
| 2008 | Anna Paquin | True Blood | Sookie Stackhouse | HBO |
| 2008 | Glenn Close | Damages | Patty Hewes | FX |
| 2008 | Kathryn Erbe | Law & Order: Criminal Intent | Alexandra Eames | USA Network |
| 2008 | Holly Hunter | Saving Grace | Grace Hanadarko | TNT |
| 2008 | Sally Field | Brothers and Sisters | Nora Walker | ABC |
| 2008 | Kyra Sedgwick | The Closer | Brenda Leigh Johnson | TNT |
| 2009 | Glenn Close | Damages | Patty Hewes | FX |
| 2009 | Stana Katic | Castle | Kate Beckett | ABC |
| 2009 | Julianna Margulies | The Good Wife | Alicia Florrick | CBS |
| 2009 | Elisabeth Moss | Mad Men | Peggy Olson | AMC |
| 2009 | Jill Scott | The No. 1 Ladies' Detective Agency | Precious Ramotswe | HBO |

=== 2010s ===
| Year | Actor | Series | Role | Network |
|---|---|---|---|---|
| 2010 | Connie Britton | Friday Night Lights | Tami Taylor | Audience |
| 2010 | January Jones | Mad Men | Betty Draper | AMC |
| 2010 | Julianna Margulies | The Good Wife | Alicia Florrick | CBS |
| 2010 | Anna Paquin | True Blood | Sookie Stackhouse | HBO |
| 2010 | Katey Sagal | Sons of Anarchy | Gemma Teller Morrow | FX |
| 2011 | Claire Danes | Homeland | Carrie Mathison | Showtime |
| 2011 | Connie Britton | Friday Night Lights | Tami Taylor | Audience |
| 2011 | Mireille Enos | The Killing | Sarah Linden | AMC |
| 2011 | Julianna Margulies | The Good Wife | Alicia Florrick | CBS |
| 2011 | Katey Sagal | Sons of Anarchy | Gemma Teller Morrow | FX |
| 2011 | Eve Myles | Torchwood | Gwen Cooper | Starz |
| 2012 | Claire Danes | Homeland | Carrie Mathison | Showtime |
| 2012 | Connie Britton | Nashville | Rayna Jaymes | AMC |
| 2012 | Hayden Panettiere | Nashville | Juliette Barnes | AMC |
| 2012 | Michelle Dockery | Downton Abbey | Lady Mary Crawley | ITV |
| 2012 | Julianna Margulies | The Good Wife | Alicia Florrick | CBS |
| 2012 | Chloë Sevigny | Hit & Miss | Mia | Sky Atlantic |
| 2013 | Robin Wright | House of Cards | Claire Underwood | Netflix |
| 2013 | Lizzy Caplan | Masters of Sex | Virginia Johnson | Showtime |
| 2013 | Olivia Colman | Broadchurch | Detective Sergeant Ellie Miller | ITV |
| 2013 | Vera Farmiga | Bates Motel | Norma Louise Bates | A&E |
| 2013 | Tatiana Maslany | Orphan Black | Various Characters | BBC America |
| 2013 | Anne Reid | Last Tango in Halifax | Celia Dawson | BBC One |
| 2013 | Keri Russell | The Americans | Elizabeth Jennings (Nadezhda) | FX |
| 2013 | Abigail Spencer | Rectify | Amantha Holden | SundanceTV |
| 2014 | Keri Russell | The Americans | Elizabeth Jennings (Nadezhda) | FX |
| 2014 | Gillian Anderson | The Fall | Stella Gibson | BBC Two |
| 2014 | Lizzy Caplan | Masters of Sex | Virginia Johnson | Showtime |
| 2014 | Ruth Wilson | The Affair | Alison Lockhart | Showtime |
| 2014 | Eva Green | Penny Dreadful | Vanessa Ives | Showtime |
| 2014 | Tatiana Maslany | Orphan Black | Various Characters | BBC America |
| 2014 | Julianna Margulies | The Good Wife | Alicia Florrick | CBS |
| 2014 | Robin Wright | House of Cards | Claire Underwood | Netflix |
| 2015 | Claire Danes | Homeland | Carrie Mathison | Showtime |
| 2015 | Kirsten Dunst | Fargo | Peggy Blumquist | FX |
| 2015 | Lady Gaga | American Horror Story: Hotel | Elizabeth Johnson / The Countess | FX |
| 2015 | Taraji P. Henson | Empire | Cookie Lyon | Fox |
| 2015 | Felicity Huffman | American Crime | Barbara "Barb" Hanlon | ABC |
| 2015 | Tatiana Maslany | Orphan Black | Various Characters | BBC America |
| 2015 | Robin Wright | House of Cards | Claire Underwood | Netflix |
| 2016 | Evan Rachel Wood | Westworld | Dolores Abernathy / Wyatt | HBO |
| 2016 | Felicity Huffman | American Crime | Leslie Graham | ABC |
| 2016 | Sarah Lancashire | Happy Valley | Sgt. Catherine Cawood | BBC One |
| 2016 | Tatiana Maslany | Orphan Black | Various Characters | BBC America |
| 2016 | Winona Ryder | Stranger Things | Joyce Byers | Netflix |
| 2016 | Ruth Wilson | The Affair | Alison Lockhart | Showtime |
| 2017 | Elisabeth Moss | The Handmaid's Tale | Offred / June Osborne | Hulu |
| 2017 | Caitriona Balfe | Outlander | Claire Fraser | Starz |
| 2017 | Carrie Coon | The Leftovers | Nora Durst | HBO |
| 2017 | Maggie Gyllenhaal | The Deuce | Eileen "Candy" Merell | HBO |
| 2017 | Katherine Langford | 13 Reasons Why | Hannah Baker | Netflix |
| 2017 | Ruth Wilson | The Affair | Alison Lockhart | Showtime |
| 2018 | Julia Roberts | Homecoming | Heidi Bergman | Prime Video |
| 2018 | Elisabeth Moss | The Handmaid's Tale | Offred / June Osborne | Hulu |
| 2018 | Sandra Oh | Killing Eve | Eve Polastri | BBC America |
| 2018 | Keri Russell | The Americans | Elizabeth Jennings | FX |
| 2018 | Jodie Whittaker | Doctor Who | The Doctor | BBC One |
| 2019 | Zendaya | Euphoria | Rue Bennett | HBO |
| 2019 | Olivia Colman | The Crown | Queen Elizabeth II | Netflix |
| 2019 | Jodie Comer | Killing Eve | Villanelle | BBC America |
| 2019 | Sandra Oh | Killing Eve | Eve Polastri | BBC America |
| 2019 | Regina King | Watchmen | Angela Abar / Sister Night | HBO |
| 2019 | Maggie Siff | Billions | Wendy Rhoades | Showtime |

=== 2020s ===
| Year | Actor | Series | Role | Network |
|---|---|---|---|---|
| 2020 | Olivia Colman | The Crown | Queen Elizabeth II | Netflix |
| 2020 | Caitriona Balfe | Outlander | Claire Fraser | Starz |
| 2020 | Phoebe Dynevor | Bridgerton | Daphne Bridgerton | Netflix |
| 2020 | Laura Linney | Ozark | Wendy Byrde | Netflix |
| 2020 | Sandra Oh | Killing Eve | Eve Polastri | BBC America |
| 2020 | Maggie Siff | Billions | Wendy Rhoades | Showtime |
| 2021 | Sarah Snook | Succession | Shiv Roy | HBO |
| 2021 | Beanie Feldstein | Impeachment: American Crime Story | Monica Lewinsky | FX |
| 2021 | Nicole Kidman | Nine Perfect Strangers | Masha Dmitrichenko | Hulu |
| 2021 | Kelly Macdonald | Line of Duty | Joanne Davidson | BBC One |
| 2021 | Elisabeth Moss | The Handmaid's Tale | June Osborne | Hulu |
| 2022 | Elisabeth Moss | The Handmaid's Tale | June Osborne | Hulu |
| 2022 | Carrie Coon | The Gilded Age | Bertha Russell | HBO |
| 2022 | Laura Linney | Ozark | Wendy Byrde | Netflix |
| 2022 | Rhea Seehorn | Better Call Saul | Kim Wexler | AMC |
| 2022 | Sissy Spacek | Night Sky | Irene York | Prime Video |
| 2022 | Zendaya | Euphoria | Rue Bennett | HBO |
| 2023 | Helen Mirren | 1923 | Cara Dutton | Paramount+ |
| 2023 | Rebecca Ferguson | Silo | Juliette Nichols | Apple TV+ |
| 2023 | Melanie Lynskey | Yellowjackets | Shauna Shipman | Showtime |
| 2023 | Bella Ramsey | The Last of Us | Ellie | HBO |
| 2023 | Sarah Snook | Succession | Siobhan "Shiv" Roy | HBO |
| 2023 | Imelda Staunton | The Crown | Queen Elizabeth II | Netflix |
