= Ruano =

Ruano (or Ruaño) is a Spanish surname. Notable people with the surname include:

- Alexis (footballer, born 1985), full name Alexis Ruano Delgado, Spanish professional footballer
- Alfredo Ruano (died 1987), Salvadoran footballer
- Aythami Ruano (born 1977), Spanish judoka
- German Ruano (born 1971), Guatemalan football defender
- Gualberto Ruaño, Puerto Rican-American scientist
- Idoia López Riaño, Basque terrorist hitwoman
- Roque Ruaño (1877–1935), Spanish priest-civil engineer
- Teodora Ruano (born 1969), Spanish track and road racing cyclist
- Virginia Ruano Pascual (born 1973), Spanish professional tennis player
