= Primetime Emmy Award for Outstanding Lead Actress in a Drama Series =

Award for lead actress in a television drama series

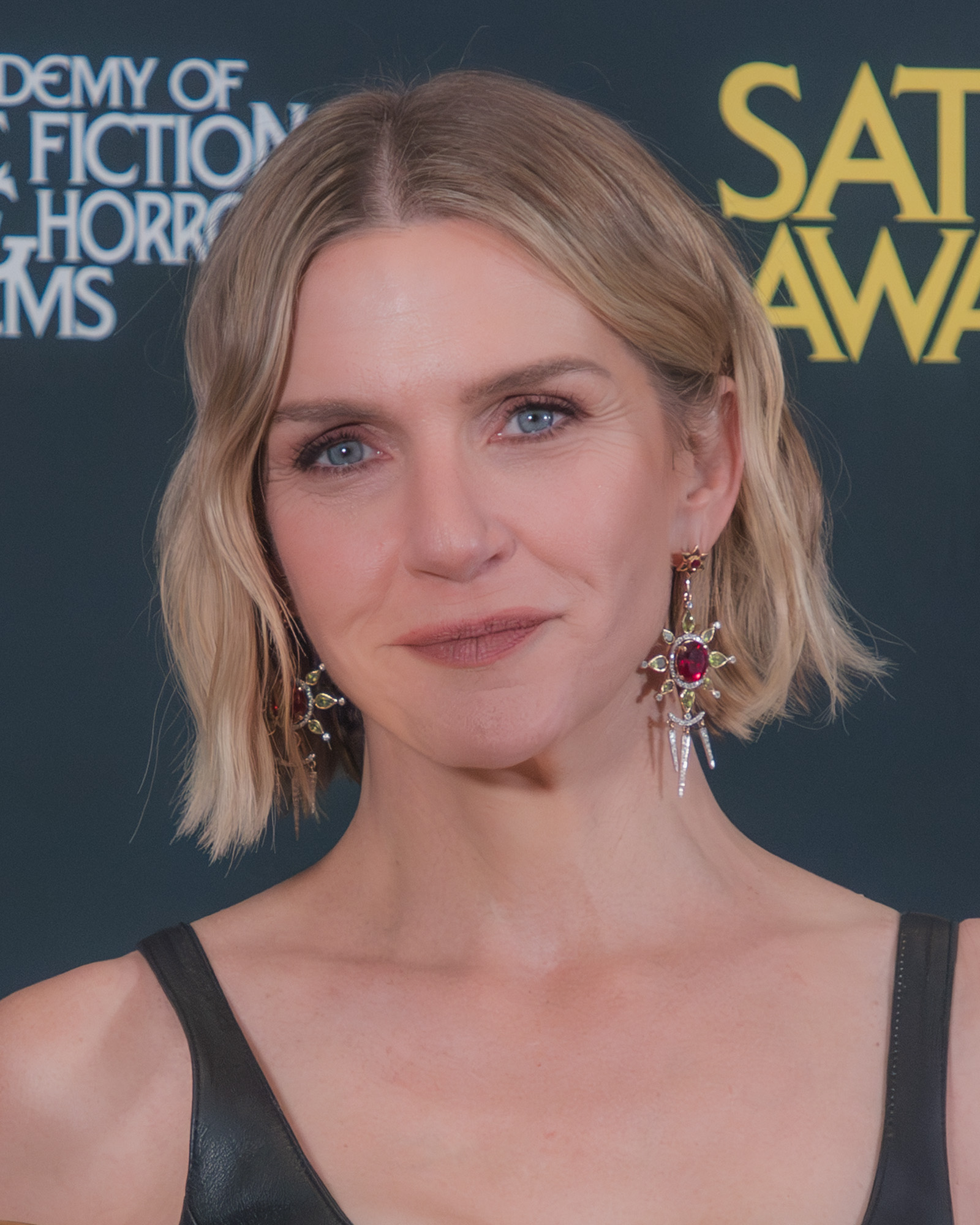
- The 2026 recipient: Rhea Seehorn
- Awarded for: Outstanding Lead Actress in a Drama Series
- Country: United States
- Presented by: Academy of Television Arts & Sciences
- First award: 1954
- Currently held by: Rhea Seehorn, Pluribus (2026)
- Website: emmys.com

The Primetime Emmy Award for Outstanding Lead Actress in a Drama Series is an award presented annually in the U.S. by the Academy of Television Arts & Sciences (ATAS). It is given in honor of an actress who has delivered an outstanding performance in a leading role on a television drama series for the primetime network season.

The award was first presented at the 6th Primetime Emmy Awards on February 11, 1954. The acting awards presented during the inaugural years were not genre-specific, with actresses in either drama or comedy series receiving nominations and awards. While Eve Arden was the first winner in the female acting category, Loretta Young was the first actress to win for a lead performance in a drama series. By 1966, the acting awards were split into drama and comedy categories, undergoing several name changes until settling with the current title.

Since its inception, the award has been given to 157 actresses, with 31 winning for performances in a drama series. Tyne Daly and Michael Learned hold the record for most wins in the category, with four each. Angela Lansbury is the most nominated actress in the category, with twelve nominations, though she never won. In 2015, Viola Davis became the first African-American woman to win, for her performance as Annalise Keating on How to Get Away with Murder. In 2020, Zendaya became the youngest winner, at age 24, for Euphoria. She won again in 2022, becoming the first African-American to win twice. Kathy Bates is the oldest nominee, at age 77, for her role in Matlock. In 2024, Anna Sawai became the first Asian woman to win, for her role in Shogun. As of 2026, Rhea Seehorn is the most recent winner, receiving the award for her work on Pluribus.

== Winners and nominations ==
Listed below are the winners of the award for each year, as well as the other nominees.

Key	Meaning
	Indicates the winning actress
#	Indicates a performance in a miniseries or television film, prior to the category's creation
§	Indicates a performance as a guest performer, prior to the category's creation

=== 1950s ===
Year	Actress	Role	Program	Network
Best Female Star of a Regular Series
1954 (6th) (Note: Early Emmy ceremonies did not have genre-specific acting categories)	Eve Arden	Connie Brooks	Our Miss Brooks	CBS
1954 (6th)	Lucille Ball	Lucy Ricardo	I Love Lucy	CBS
1954 (6th)	Imogene Coca	Various characters	Your Show of Shows	NBC
1954 (6th)	Dinah Shore	Herself	The Dinah Shore Show	NBC
1954 (6th)	Loretta Young	Various characters	The Loretta Young Show	NBC
Best Actress Starring in a Regular Series
1955 (7th)	Loretta Young	Various characters	The Loretta Young Show	NBC
1955 (7th)	Gracie Allen	Gracie Allen	The George Burns and Gracie Allen Show	CBS
1955 (7th)	Eve Arden	Connie Brooks	Our Miss Brooks	CBS
1955 (7th)	Lucille Ball	Lucy Ricardo	I Love Lucy	CBS
1955 (7th)	Ann Sothern	Susie McNamara	Private Secretary	CBS
Best Actress – Continuing Performance
1956 (8th)	Lucille Ball	Lucy Ricardo	I Love Lucy	CBS
1956 (8th)	Gracie Allen	Gracie Allen	The George Burns and Gracie Allen Show	CBS
1956 (8th)	Eve Arden	Connie Brooks	Our Miss Brooks	CBS
1956 (8th)	Jean Hagen	Margaret Williams	Make Room for Daddy	ABC
1956 (8th)	Ann Sothern	Susie McNamara	Private Secretary	CBS
Best Continuing Performance by an Actress
1957 (9th)	Loretta Young	Various characters	The Loretta Young Show	NBC
1957 (9th)	Jan Clayton	Ellen Miller	Lassie	CBS
1957 (9th)	Ida Lupino	Various characters	Four Star Playhouse	CBS
1957 (9th)	Peggy Wood	Mama	Mama	CBS
1957 (9th)	Jane Wyman	Various characters	Jane Wyman Theatre	NBC
Best Continuing Performance by an Actress in a Leading Role in a Dramatic or Comedy Series
1958 (10th)	Jane Wyatt	Margaret Anderson	Father Knows Best	NBC
1958 (10th)	Eve Arden	Liza Hammond	The Eve Arden Show	CBS
1958 (10th)	Spring Byington	Lily Ruskin	December Bride	CBS
1958 (10th)	Jan Clayton	Ellen Miller	Lassie	CBS
1958 (10th)	Ida Lupino	Eve Drake	Mr. Adams and Eve	CBS
Best Actress in a Leading Role (Continuing Character) in a Dramatic Series
1959 (11th)	Loretta Young	Various characters	The Loretta Young Show	NBC
1959 (11th)	Phyllis Kirk	Nora Charles	The Thin Man	NBC
1959 (11th)	June Lockhart	Ruth Martin	Lassie	CBS
1959 (11th)	Jane Wyman	Various characters	The Jane Wyman Show	NBC

=== 1960s ===
Year	Actress	Role	Program	Network
Outstanding Performance by an Actress in a Series (Lead or Support)
1960 (12th)	Jane Wyatt	Margaret Anderson	Father Knows Best	CBS
1960 (12th)	Donna Reed	Donna Stone	The Donna Reed Show	ABC
1960 (12th)	Teresa Wright	Margaret Bourke-White	NBC Sunday Showcase	NBC
1960 (12th)	Loretta Young	Various characters	The Loretta Young Show	NBC
Outstanding Performance by an Actress in a Series (Lead)
1961 (13th)	Barbara Stanwyck	Various characters	The Barbara Stanwyck Show	NBC
1961 (13th)	Donna Reed	Donna Stone	The Donna Reed Show	ABC
1961 (13th)	Loretta Young	Various characters	The Loretta Young Show	NBC
Outstanding Continued Performance by an Actress in a Series (Lead)
1962 (14th)	Shirley Booth	Hazel Burke	Hazel	NBC
1962 (14th)	Gertrude Berg	Sarah Green	The Gertrude Berg Show	CBS
1962 (14th)	Donna Reed	Donna Stone	The Donna Reed Show	ABC
1962 (14th)	Mary Stuart	Joanne Gardner	Search for Tomorrow	CBS
1962 (14th)	Cara Williams	Gladys Porter	Pete and Gladys	CBS
1963 (15th)	Shirley Booth	Hazel Burke	Hazel	NBC
1963 (15th)	Lucille Ball	Lucy Carmichael	The Lucy Show	CBS
1963 (15th)	Shirl Conway	Liz Thorpe	The Nurses	CBS
1963 (15th)	Mary Tyler Moore	Laura Petrie	The Dick Van Dyke Show	CBS
1963 (15th)	Irene Ryan	Granny	The Beverly Hillbillies	CBS
1964 (16th)	Mary Tyler Moore	Laura Petrie	The Dick Van Dyke Show	CBS
1964 (16th)	Shirley Booth	Hazel Burke	Hazel	NBC
1964 (16th)	Patty Duke	Patty and Cathy Lane	The Patty Duke Show	ABC
1964 (16th)	Irene Ryan	Granny	The Beverly Hillbillies	CBS
1964 (16th)	Inger Stevens	Katy Holstrum	The Farmer's Daughter	ABC
Outstanding Individual Achievements in Entertainment – Actors and Performers
1965 (17th)
1965 (17th)	Leonard Bernstein	Conductor	New York Philharmonic Young People's Concerts with Leonard Bernstein	CBS
1965 (17th)	Lynn Fontanne	Fanny Bowditch Holmes	Hallmark Hall of Fame: "The Magnificent Yankee"	NBC
1965 (17th)	Alfred Lunt	Oliver Wendell Holmes, Jr.	Hallmark Hall of Fame: "The Magnificent Yankee"	NBC
1965 (17th)	Barbra Streisand	Herself	My Name Is Barbra	CBS
1965 (17th)	Dick Van Dyke	Rob Petrie	The Dick Van Dyke Show	CBS
1965 (17th)	Julie Andrews	Herself	The Andy Williams Show: "November 30, 1964"	NBC
1965 (17th)	Johnny Carson	Host	The Tonight Show Starring Johnny Carson	NBC
1965 (17th)	Gladys Cooper	Margaret St. Clair	The Rogues	NBC
1965 (17th)	Robert Coote	Timmy St. Clair	The Rogues	NBC
1965 (17th)	Richard Crenna	James Slattery	Slattery's People	CBS
1965 (17th)	Julie Harris	Florence Nightingale	Hallmark Hall of Fame: "The Holy Terror"	NBC
1965 (17th)	Bob Hope	Himself	Chrysler Presents A Bob Hope Comedy Special	NBC
1965 (17th)	Dean Jagger	Principal Albert Vane	Mr. Novak	NBC
1965 (17th)	Danny Kaye	Host	The Danny Kaye Show	CBS
1965 (17th)	David McCallum	Illya Kuryakin	The Man from U.N.C.L.E.	NBC
1965 (17th)	Red Skelton	Himself	The Red Skelton Hour	CBS
Outstanding Continued Performance by an Actress in a Leading Role in a Dramatic Series
1966 (18th)	Barbara Stanwyck	Victoria Barkley	The Big Valley	ABC
1966 (18th)	Anne Francis	Honey West	Honey West	ABC
1966 (18th)	Barbara Parkins	Betty Anderson Cord	Peyton Place	ABC
1967 (19th)	Barbara Bain	Cinnamon Carter	Mission: Impossible	CBS
1967 (19th)	Diana Rigg	Emma Peel	The Avengers	ABC
1967 (19th)	Barbara Stanwyck	Victoria Barkley	The Big Valley	ABC
1968 (20th)	Barbara Bain	Cinnamon Carter	Mission: Impossible	CBS
1968 (20th)	Diana Rigg	Emma Peel	The Avengers	ABC
1968 (20th)	Barbara Stanwyck	Victoria Barkley	The Big Valley	ABC
1969 (21st)	Barbara Bain	Cinnamon Carter	Mission: Impossible	CBS
1969 (21st)	Joan Blondell	Lottie Hatfield	Here Come the Brides	ABC
1969 (21st)	Peggy Lipton	Julie Barnes	The Mod Squad	ABC

=== 1970s ===
Year	Actress	Role	Program	Network
Outstanding Continued Performance by an Actress in a Leading Role in a Dramatic Series
1970 (22nd)	Susan Hampshire #	Fleur Mont	The Forsyte Saga	NET
1970 (22nd)	Joan Blondell	Lottie Hatfield	Here Come the Brides	ABC
1970 (22nd)	Peggy Lipton	Julie Barnes	The Mod Squad	ABC
1971 (23rd)	Susan Hampshire #	Sarah Churchill, Duchess of Marlborough	The First Churchills	PBS
1971 (23rd)	Linda Cristal	Victoria Montoya	The High Chaparral	NBC
1971 (23rd)	Peggy Lipton	Julie Barnes	The Mod Squad	ABC
1972 (24th)	Glenda Jackson #	Elizabeth I of England	Elizabeth R	PBS
1972 (24th)	Peggy Lipton	Julie Barnes	The Mod Squad	ABC
1972 (24th)	Susan Saint James	Sally McMillian	McMillan & Wife	NBC
Outstanding Continued Performance by an Actress in a Leading Role (Drama Series - Continuing)
1973 (25th)	Michael Learned	Olivia Walton	The Waltons	CBS
1973 (25th)	Lynda Day George	Lisa Casey	Mission: Impossible	CBS
1973 (25th)	Susan Saint James	Sally McMillian	McMillan & Wife	NBC
Best Lead Actress in a Drama Series
1974 (26th)	Michael Learned	Olivia Walton	The Waltons	CBS
1974 (26th)	Jean Marsh	Rose Buck	Upstairs, Downstairs	PBS
1974 (26th)	Jeanette Nolan	Sally Fergus	Dirty Sally	CBS
Outstanding Lead Actress in a Drama Series
1975 (27th)	Jean Marsh	Rose Buck	Upstairs, Downstairs	PBS
1975 (27th)	Angie Dickinson	Sgt. Leann Anderson	Police Woman	NBC
1975 (27th)	Michael Learned	Olivia Walton	The Waltons	CBS
1976 (28th)	Michael Learned	Olivia Walton	The Waltons	CBS
1976 (28th)	Angie Dickinson	Sgt. Leann Anderson	Police Woman	NBC
1976 (28th)	Anne Meara	Kate McShane	Kate McShane	CBS
1976 (28th)	Brenda Vaccaro	Sara Yarnell	Sara	CBS
1977 (29th)	Lindsay Wagner	Jaime Sommers	The Bionic Woman	ABC
1977 (29th)	Angie Dickinson	Sgt. Leann Anderson	Police Woman	NBC
1977 (29th)	Kate Jackson	Sabrina Duncan	Charlie's Angels	ABC
1977 (29th)	Michael Learned	Olivia Walton	The Waltons	CBS
1977 (29th)	Sada Thompson	Kate Lawrence	Family	ABC
1978 (30th)	Sada Thompson	Kate Lawrence	Family	ABC
1978 (30th)	Melissa Sue Anderson	Mary Ingalls	Little House on the Prairie	NBC
1978 (30th)	Fionnula Flanagan	Aunt Molly Culhane	How the West Was Won	ABC
1978 (30th)	Kate Jackson	Sabrina Duncan	Charlie's Angels	ABC
1978 (30th)	Michael Learned	Olivia Walton	The Waltons	CBS
1978 (30th)	Susan Sullivan	Julie Farr	Having Babies	ABC
1979 (31st)	Mariette Hartley §	Carolyn Fields	The Incredible Hulk	CBS
1979 (31st)	Barbara Bel Geddes	Miss Ellie Ewing	Dallas	CBS
1979 (31st)	Rita Moreno §	Rita Capkovick	The Rockford Files	NBC
1979 (31st)	Sada Thompson	Kate Lawrence	Family	ABC

=== 1980s ===
Year	Actress	Role	Program	Network
1980 (32nd)	Barbara Bel Geddes	Miss Ellie Ewing	Dallas	CBS
1980 (32nd)	Lauren Bacall §	Kendall Warren	The Rockford Files	NBC
1980 (32nd)	Mariette Hartley §	Althea Morgan	The Rockford Files	NBC
1980 (32nd)	Kristy McNichol	Buddy Lawrence	Family	ABC
1980 (32nd)	Sada Thompson	Kate Lawrence	Family	ABC
1981 (33rd)	Barbara Babcock §	Grace Gardner	Hill Street Blues	NBC
1981 (33rd)	Barbara Bel Geddes	Miss Ellie Ewing	Dallas	CBS
1981 (33rd)	Linda Gray	Sue Ellen Ewing	Dallas	CBS
1981 (33rd)	Veronica Hamel	Joyce Davenport	Hill Street Blues	NBC
1981 (33rd)	Michael Learned	Mary Benjamin	Nurse	CBS
1981 (33rd)	Stefanie Powers	Jennifer Hart	Hart to Hart	ABC
1982 (34th)	Michael Learned	Mary Benjamin	Nurse	CBS
1982 (34th)	Debbie Allen	Lydia Grant	Fame	NBC
1982 (34th)	Veronica Hamel	Joyce Davenport	Hill Street Blues	NBC
1982 (34th)	Michele Lee	Karen Fairgate	Knots Landing	CBS
1982 (34th)	Stefanie Powers	Jennifer Hart	Hart to Hart	ABC
1983 (35th)	Tyne Daly	Mary Beth Lacey	Cagney & Lacey	CBS
1983 (35th)	Debbie Allen	Lydia Grant	Fame	NBC
1983 (35th)	Linda Evans	Krystle Carrington	Dynasty	ABC
1983 (35th)	Sharon Gless	Christine Cagney	Cagney & Lacey	CBS
1983 (35th)	Veronica Hamel	Joyce Davenport	Hill Street Blues	NBC
1984 (36th)	Tyne Daly	Mary Beth Lacey	Cagney & Lacey	CBS
1984 (36th)	Debbie Allen	Lydia Grant	Fame	Syndicated
1984 (36th)	Joan Collins	Alexis Colby	Dynasty	ABC
1984 (36th)	Sharon Gless	Christine Cagney	Cagney & Lacey	CBS
1984 (36th)	Veronica Hamel	Joyce Davenport	Hill Street Blues	NBC
1985 (37th)	Tyne Daly	Mary Beth Lacey	Cagney & Lacey	CBS
1985 (37th)	Debbie Allen	Lydia Grant	Fame	Syndicated
1985 (37th)	Sharon Gless	Christine Cagney	Cagney & Lacey	CBS
1985 (37th)	Veronica Hamel	Joyce Davenport	Hill Street Blues	NBC
1985 (37th)	Angela Lansbury	Jessica Fletcher	Murder, She Wrote	CBS
1986 (38th)	Sharon Gless	Christine Cagney	Cagney & Lacey	CBS
1986 (38th)	Tyne Daly	Mary Beth Lacey	Cagney & Lacey	CBS
1986 (38th)	Angela Lansbury	Jessica Fletcher	Murder, She Wrote	CBS
1986 (38th)	Cybill Shepherd	Maddie Hayes	Moonlighting	ABC
1986 (38th)	Alfre Woodard	Roxanne Turner	St. Elsewhere	NBC
1987 (39th)	Sharon Gless	Christine Cagney	Cagney & Lacey	CBS
1987 (39th)	Tyne Daly	Mary Beth Lacey	Cagney & Lacey	CBS
1987 (39th)	Susan Dey	Grace Van Owen	L.A. Law	NBC
1987 (39th)	Jill Eikenberry	Ann Kelsey	L.A. Law	NBC
1987 (39th)	Angela Lansbury	Jessica Fletcher	Murder, She Wrote	CBS
1988 (40th)	Tyne Daly	Mary Beth Lacey	Cagney & Lacey	CBS
1988 (40th)	Susan Dey	Grace Van Owen	L.A. Law	NBC
1988 (40th)	Jill Eikenberry	Ann Kelsey	L.A. Law	NBC
1988 (40th)	Sharon Gless	Christine Cagney	Cagney & Lacey	CBS
1988 (40th)	Angela Lansbury	Jessica Fletcher	Murder, She Wrote	CBS
1989 (41st)	Dana Delany	Colleen McMurphy	China Beach	ABC
1989 (41st)	Susan Dey	Grace Van Owen	L.A. Law	NBC
1989 (41st)	Jill Eikenberry	Ann Kelsey	L.A. Law	NBC
1989 (41st)	Linda Hamilton	Catherine Chandler	Beauty and the Beast	CBS
1989 (41st)	Angela Lansbury	Jessica Fletcher	Murder, She Wrote	CBS

=== 1990s ===
Year	Actress	Role	Program	Episode Submission	Network
1990 (42nd)	Patricia Wettig	Nancy Krieger-Weston	Thirtysomething	"The Other Shoe"	ABC
1990 (42nd)	Jill Eikenberry	Ann Kelsey	L.A. Law	—N/a	NBC
1990 (42nd)	Dana Delany	Colleen McMurphy	China Beach	—N/a	ABC
1990 (42nd)	Piper Laurie	Catherine Martell	Twin Peaks	—N/a	ABC
1990 (42nd)	Angela Lansbury	Jessica Fletcher	Murder, She Wrote	—N/a	CBS
1991 (43rd)	Patricia Wettig	Nancy Krieger-Weston	Thirtysomething	"Guns and Roses"	ABC
1991 (43rd)	Dana Delany	Colleen McMurphy	China Beach	"Fever"	ABC
1991 (43rd)	Sharon Gless	Rosie O'Neill	The Trials of Rosie O'Neill	"When I'm 44"	CBS
1991 (43rd)	Angela Lansbury	Jessica Fletcher	Murder, She Wrote	"Thursday's Child"	CBS
1992 (44th)	Dana Delany	Colleen McMurphy	China Beach	"Through and Through"	ABC
1992 (44th)	Sharon Gless	Rosie O'Neill	The Trials of Rosie O'Neill	"Heartbreak Hotel"	CBS
1992 (44th)	Angela Lansbury	Jessica Fletcher	Murder, She Wrote	"Night Fears"	CBS
1992 (44th)	Shirley Knight §	Melanie Currants	Law & Order	"The Wages of Love"	NBC
1992 (44th)	Regina Taylor	Lilly Harper	I'll Fly Away	"Coming Home"	NBC
1992 (44th)	Kate Nelligan §	Sydney Carver	Road to Avonlea	"After the Honeymoon"	Disney Channel
1993 (45th)	Kathy Baker	Jill Brock	Picket Fences	"Thanksgiving"	CBS
1993 (45th)	Swoosie Kurtz	Alex Reed	Sisters	"Mirror, Mirror"	NBC
1993 (45th)	Regina Taylor	Lilly Harper	I'll Fly Away	"Comfort and Joy"	NBC
1993 (45th)	Angela Lansbury	Jessica Fletcher	Murder, She Wrote	"Night of the Coyote"	CBS
1993 (45th)	Janine Turner	Maggie O'Connell	Northern Exposure	"Love's Labour Mislaid"	CBS
1994 (46th)	Sela Ward	Teddy Reed	Sisters	"Land of the Lost Children"	NBC
1994 (46th)	Angela Lansbury	Jessica Fletcher	Murder, She Wrote	"A Killing in Cork"	CBS
1994 (46th)	Jane Seymour	Michaela Quinn	Dr. Quinn, Medicine Woman	"Best Friends"	CBS
1994 (46th)	Kathy Baker	Jill Brock	Picket Fences	"Guns 'R' Us"	CBS
1994 (46th)	Swoosie Kurtz	Alex Reed	Sisters	"Protective Measures"	NBC
1995 (47th)	Kathy Baker	Jill Brock	Picket Fences	"Frogman Returns"	CBS
1995 (47th)	Claire Danes	Angela Chase	My So-Called Life	"Pilot"	ABC
1995 (47th)	Angela Lansbury	Jessica Fletcher	Murder, She Wrote	"Dear Deadly"	CBS
1995 (47th)	Sherry Stringfield	Susan Lewis	ER	"Motherhood"	NBC
1995 (47th)	Cicely Tyson	Carrie Grace Battle	Sweet Justice	"In the Name of the Sun"	NBC
1996 (48th)	Kathy Baker	Jill Brock	Picket Fences	"Bottled"	CBS
1996 (48th)	Gillian Anderson	Dana Scully	The X-Files	"Piper Maru"	Fox
1996 (48th)	Christine Lahti	Kate Austin	Chicago Hope	"Transplanted Affection"	CBS
1996 (48th)	Angela Lansbury	Jessica Fletcher	Murder, She Wrote	"Death by Demographics"	CBS
1996 (48th)	Sherry Stringfield	Susan Lewis	ER	"Take These Broken Wings"	NBC
1997 (49th)	Gillian Anderson	Dana Scully	The X-Files	"Memento Mori"	Fox
1997 (49th)	Roma Downey	Monica	Touched by an Angel	"Missing in Action"	CBS
1997 (49th)	Christine Lahti	Kate Austin	Chicago Hope	"Back to the Future"	CBS
1997 (49th)	Julianna Margulies	Carol Hathaway	ER	"The Long Way Around"	NBC
1997 (49th)	Sherry Stringfield	Susan Lewis	ER	"Fear of Flying"	NBC
1998 (50th)	Christine Lahti	Kate Austin	Chicago Hope	"Cabin Fever"	CBS
1998 (50th)	Gillian Anderson	Dana Scully	The X-Files	"All Souls"	Fox
1998 (50th)	Roma Downey	Monica	Touched by an Angel	"The Spirit of Liberty Moon"	CBS
1998 (50th)	Julianna Margulies	Carol Hathaway	ER	"Carter's Choice"	NBC
1998 (50th)	Jane Seymour	Michaela Quinn	Dr. Quinn, Medicine Woman	"Point Blank"	CBS
1999 (51st)	Edie Falco	Carmela Soprano	The Sopranos	"College"	HBO
1999 (51st)	Gillian Anderson	Dana Scully	The X-Files	"Milagro"	Fox
1999 (51st)	Lorraine Bracco	Jennifer Melfi	The Sopranos	"The Legend of Tennessee Moltisanti"	HBO
1999 (51st)	Christine Lahti	Kate Austin	Chicago Hope	"Karmic Relief"	CBS
1999 (51st)	Julianna Margulies	Carol Hathaway	ER	"The Storm (Part II)"	NBC

=== 2000s ===
Year	Actress	Role	Program	Episode Submission	Network
2000 (52nd)	Sela Ward	Lily Manning	Once and Again	"Pilot"	ABC
2000 (52nd)	Lorraine Bracco	Jennifer Melfi	The Sopranos	"Big Girls Don't Cry"	HBO
2000 (52nd)	Edie Falco	Carmela Soprano	The Sopranos	"Full Leather Jacket"	HBO
2000 (52nd)	Amy Brenneman	Amy Gray	Judging Amy	"The Wee Hours"	CBS
2000 (52nd)	Julianna Margulies	Carol Hathaway	ER	"Great Expectations"	NBC
2001 (53rd)	Edie Falco	Carmela Soprano	The Sopranos	"Second Opinion"	HBO
2001 (53rd)	Amy Brenneman	Amy Gray	Judging Amy	"The Undertow"	CBS
2001 (53rd)	Marg Helgenberger	Catherine Willows	CSI: Crime Scene Investigation	"Justice Is Served"	CBS
2001 (53rd)	Lorraine Bracco	Jennifer Melfi	The Sopranos	"Employee of the Month"	HBO
2001 (53rd)	Sela Ward	Lily Manning	Once and Again	"Second Time Around"	ABC
2002 (54th)	Allison Janney	C. J. Cregg	The West Wing	"The Women of Qumar"	NBC
2002 (54th)	Amy Brenneman	Amy Gray	Judging Amy	"Tidal Wave"	CBS
2002 (54th)	Frances Conroy	Ruth Fisher	Six Feet Under	"Pilot"	HBO
2002 (54th)	Rachel Griffiths	Brenda Chenowith	Six Feet Under	"The Secret"	HBO
2002 (54th)	Jennifer Garner	Sydney Bristow	Alias	"Truth Be Told"	ABC
2003 (55th)	Edie Falco	Carmela Soprano	The Sopranos	"Whitecaps"	HBO
2003 (55th)	Jennifer Garner	Sydney Bristow	Alias	"Phase One"	ABC
2003 (55th)	Frances Conroy	Ruth Fisher	Six Feet Under	"Nobody Sleeps"	HBO
2003 (55th)	Allison Janney	C. J. Cregg	The West Wing	"The Long Goodbye"	NBC
2003 (55th)	Marg Helgenberger	Catherine Willows	CSI: Crime Scene Investigation	"Lady Heather's Box"	CBS
2004 (56th)	Allison Janney	C. J. Cregg	The West Wing	"Access"	NBC
2004 (56th)	Edie Falco	Carmela Soprano	The Sopranos	"All Happy Families..."	HBO
2004 (56th)	Jennifer Garner	Sydney Bristow	Alias	"The Two"	ABC
2004 (56th)	Mariska Hargitay	Olivia Benson	Law & Order: Special Victims Unit	"Control"	NBC
2004 (56th)	Amber Tamblyn	Joan Girardi	Joan of Arcadia	"Pilot"	CBS
2005 (57th)	Patricia Arquette	Allison DuBois	Medium	"In Sickness and Adultery"	NBC
2005 (57th)	Glenn Close	Monica Rawling	The Shield	"Hurt"	FX
2005 (57th)	Frances Conroy	Ruth Fisher	Six Feet Under	"Coming and Going"	HBO
2005 (57th)	Mariska Hargitay	Olivia Benson	Law & Order: Special Victims Unit	"Charisma"	NBC
2005 (57th)	Jennifer Garner	Sydney Bristow	Alias	"Before the Flood"	ABC
2006 (58th)	Mariska Hargitay	Olivia Benson	Law & Order: Special Victims Unit	"911"	NBC
2006 (58th)	Frances Conroy	Ruth Fisher	Six Feet Under	"Everyone's Waiting"	HBO
2006 (58th)	Geena Davis	Mackenzie Allen	Commander in Chief	"Pilot"	ABC
2006 (58th)	Allison Janney	C. J. Cregg	The West Wing	"Institutional Memory"	NBC
2006 (58th)	Kyra Sedgwick	Brenda Leigh Johnson	The Closer	"Fantasy Date"	TNT
2007 (59th)	Sally Field	Nora Walker	Brothers & Sisters	"Mistakes Were Made (Part 2)"	ABC
2007 (59th)	Patricia Arquette	Allison DuBois	Medium	"Be Kind, Rewind"	NBC
2007 (59th)	Mariska Hargitay	Olivia Benson	Law & Order: Special Victims Unit	"Florida"	NBC
2007 (59th)	Minnie Driver	Dahlia Malloy	The Riches	"Pilot"	FX
2007 (59th)	Edie Falco	Carmela Soprano	The Sopranos	"The Second Coming"	HBO
2007 (59th)	Kyra Sedgwick	Brenda Leigh Johnson	The Closer	"Slippin'"	TNT
2008 (60th)	Glenn Close	Patty Hewes	Damages	"Get Me a Lawyer"	FX
2008 (60th)	Sally Field	Nora Walker	Brothers & Sisters	"History Repeating"	ABC
2008 (60th)	Mariska Hargitay	Olivia Benson	Law & Order: Special Victims Unit	"Undercover"	NBC
2008 (60th)	Holly Hunter	Grace Hanadarko	Saving Grace	"Tacos, Tulips, Duck, and Spices"	TNT
2008 (60th)	Kyra Sedgwick	Brenda Leigh Johnson	The Closer	"Manhunt"	TNT
2009 (61st)	Glenn Close	Patty Hewes	Damages	"Trust Me"	FX
2009 (61st)	Sally Field	Nora Walker	Brothers & Sisters	"A Father Dreams"	ABC
2009 (61st)	Mariska Hargitay	Olivia Benson	Law & Order: Special Victims Unit	"PTSD"	NBC
2009 (61st)	Holly Hunter	Grace Hanadarko	Saving Grace	"Have a Seat, Earl"	TNT
2009 (61st)	Kyra Sedgwick	Brenda Leigh Johnson	The Closer	"Cherry Bomb"	TNT
2009 (61st)	Elisabeth Moss	Peggy Olson	Mad Men	"Meditations in an Emergency"	AMC

=== 2010s ===
Year	Actress	Role	Program	Episode Submission	Network
2010 (62nd)	Kyra Sedgwick	Brenda Leigh Johnson	The Closer	"Maternal Instincts"	TNT
2010 (62nd)	Connie Britton	Tami Taylor	Friday Night Lights	"After the Fall"	DirecTV
2010 (62nd)	Glenn Close	Patty Hewes	Damages	"Your Secrets Are Safe"	FX
2010 (62nd)	Mariska Hargitay	Olivia Benson	Law & Order: Special Victims Unit	"Perverted"	NBC
2010 (62nd)	January Jones	Betty Draper	Mad Men	"The Gypsy and the Hobo"	AMC
2010 (62nd)	Julianna Margulies	Alicia Florrick	The Good Wife	"Threesome"	CBS
2011 (63rd)	Julianna Margulies	Alicia Florrick	The Good Wife	"In Sickness"	CBS
2011 (63rd)	Kathy Bates	Harriet Korn	Harry's Law	"Innocent Man"	NBC
2011 (63rd)	Connie Britton	Tami Taylor	Friday Night Lights	"Always"	DirecTV
2011 (63rd)	Mireille Enos	Sarah Linden	The Killing	"Missing"	AMC
2011 (63rd)	Mariska Hargitay	Olivia Benson	Law & Order: Special Victims Unit	"Rescue"	NBC
2011 (63rd)	Elisabeth Moss	Peggy Olson	Mad Men	"The Suitcase"	AMC
2012 (64th)	Claire Danes	Carrie Mathison	Homeland	"The Vest"	Showtime
2012 (64th)	Kathy Bates	Harriet Korn	Harry's Law	"Onward and Upward"	NBC
2012 (64th)	Glenn Close	Patty Hewes	Damages	"I've Done Way Too Much for This Girl"	DirecTV
2012 (64th)	Michelle Dockery	Lady Mary Crawley	Downton Abbey	"Episode Seven"	PBS
2012 (64th)	Julianna Margulies	Alicia Florrick	The Good Wife	"Parenting Made Easy"	CBS
2012 (64th)	Elisabeth Moss	Peggy Olson	Mad Men	"The Other Woman"	AMC
2013 (65th)	Claire Danes	Carrie Mathison	Homeland	"Q&A"	Showtime
2013 (65th)	Connie Britton	Rayna Jaymes	Nashville	"Pilot"	ABC
2013 (65th)	Michelle Dockery	Lady Mary Crawley	Downton Abbey	"Episode One"	PBS
2013 (65th)	Vera Farmiga	Norma Bates	Bates Motel	"First You Dream, Then You Die"	A&E
2013 (65th)	Elisabeth Moss	Peggy Olson	Mad Men	"The Better Half"	AMC
2013 (65th)	Kerry Washington	Olivia Pope	Scandal	"Happy Birthday, Mr. President"	ABC
2013 (65th)	Robin Wright	Claire Underwood	House of Cards	"Chapter 10"	Netflix
2014 (66th)	Julianna Margulies	Alicia Florrick	The Good Wife	"The Last Call"	CBS
2014 (66th)	Lizzy Caplan	Virginia E. Johnson	Masters of Sex	"Pilot"	Showtime
2014 (66th)	Claire Danes	Carrie Mathison	Homeland	"The Star"	Showtime
2014 (66th)	Michelle Dockery	Lady Mary Crawley	Downton Abbey	"Episode One"	PBS
2014 (66th)	Kerry Washington	Olivia Pope	Scandal	"The Fluffer"	ABC
2014 (66th)	Robin Wright	Claire Underwood	House of Cards	"Chapter 26"	Netflix
2015 (67th)	Viola Davis	Annalise Keating	How to Get Away with Murder	"Freakin' Whack-a-Mole"	ABC
2015 (67th)	Claire Danes	Carrie Mathison	Homeland	"From A to B and Back Again"	Showtime
2015 (67th)	Taraji P. Henson	Cookie Lyon	Empire	"Pilot"	Fox
2015 (67th)	Tatiana Maslany	Various characters	Orphan Black	"Certain Agony of the Battlefield"	BBC America
2015 (67th)	Elisabeth Moss	Peggy Olson	Mad Men	"Person to Person"	AMC
2015 (67th)	Robin Wright	Claire Underwood	House of Cards	"Chapter 32"	Netflix
2016 (68th)	Tatiana Maslany	Various characters	Orphan Black	"The Antisocialism of Sex"	BBC America
2016 (68th)	Claire Danes	Carrie Mathison	Homeland	"Super Powers"	Showtime
2016 (68th)	Viola Davis	Annalise Keating	How to Get Away with Murder	"There's My Baby"	ABC
2016 (68th)	Taraji P. Henson	Cookie Lyon	Empire	"Rise by Sin"	Fox
2016 (68th)	Keri Russell	Elizabeth Jennings	The Americans	"The Magic of David Copperfield V: The Statue of Liberty Disappears"	FX
2016 (68th)	Robin Wright	Claire Underwood	House of Cards	"Chapter 49"	Netflix
2017 (69th)	Elisabeth Moss	June Osborne / Offred	The Handmaid's Tale	"Night"	Hulu
2017 (69th)	Viola Davis	Annalise Keating	How to Get Away with Murder	"Wes"	ABC
2017 (69th)	Claire Foy	Queen Elizabeth II	The Crown	"Assassins"	Netflix
2017 (69th)	Keri Russell	Elizabeth Jennings	The Americans	"Dyatkovo"	FX
2017 (69th)	Evan Rachel Wood	Dolores Abernathy	Westworld	"The Bicameral Mind"	HBO
2017 (69th)	Robin Wright	Claire Underwood	House of Cards	"Chapter 65"	Netflix
2018 (70th)	Claire Foy	Queen Elizabeth II	The Crown	"Dear Mrs. Kennedy"	Netflix
2018 (70th)	Tatiana Maslany	Various characters	Orphan Black	"To Right the Wrongs of Many"	BBC America
2018 (70th)	Elisabeth Moss	June Osborne / Offred	The Handmaid's Tale	"The Last Ceremony"	Hulu
2018 (70th)	Sandra Oh	Eve Polastri	Killing Eve	"I Have a Thing About Bathrooms"	BBC America
2018 (70th)	Keri Russell	Elizabeth Jennings	The Americans	"The Summit"	FX
2018 (70th)	Evan Rachel Wood	Dolores Abernathy	Westworld	"Reunion"	HBO
2019 (71st)	Jodie Comer	Villanelle	Killing Eve	"I Hope You Like Missionary!"	BBC America
2019 (71st)	Emilia Clarke	Daenerys Targaryen	Game of Thrones	"The Last of the Starks"	HBO
2019 (71st)	Viola Davis	Annalise Keating	How to Get Away with Murder	"He Betrayed Us Both"	ABC
2019 (71st)	Laura Linney	Wendy Byrde	Ozark	"One Way Out"	Netflix
2019 (71st)	Mandy Moore	Rebecca Pearson	This Is Us	"The Graduates"	NBC
2019 (71st)	Sandra Oh	Eve Polastri	Killing Eve	"You're Mine"	BBC America
2019 (71st)	Robin Wright	Claire Underwood	House of Cards	"Chapter 70"	Netflix

=== 2020s ===
Year	Actress	Role	Program	Episode submission	Network
2020 (72nd)	Zendaya	Rue Bennett	Euphoria	"Made You Look"	HBO
2020 (72nd)	Jodie Comer	Villanelle	Killing Eve	"Are You From Pinner?"	BBC America
2020 (72nd)	Sandra Oh	Eve Polastri	Killing Eve	"Are You Leading or Am I?"	BBC America
2020 (72nd)	Jennifer Aniston	Alex Levy	The Morning Show	"In the Dark Night of the Soul It's Always 3:30 in the Morning"	Apple TV+
2020 (72nd)	Olivia Colman	Queen Elizabeth II	The Crown	"Cri de Coeur"	Netflix
2020 (72nd)	Laura Linney	Wendy Byrde	Ozark	"Fire Pink"	Netflix
2021 (73rd)	Olivia Colman	Queen Elizabeth II	The Crown	"48:1"	Netflix
2021 (73rd)	Emma Corrin	Diana, Princess of Wales	The Crown	"Fairytale"	Netflix
2021 (73rd)	Uzo Aduba	Dr. Brooke Taylor	In Treatment	"Brooke — Week 5"	HBO
2021 (73rd)	Elisabeth Moss	June Osborne	The Handmaid's Tale	"Home"	Hulu
2021 (73rd)	Michaela Jaé Rodriguez	Blanca Rodriguez	Pose	"Series Finale"	FX
2021 (73rd)	Jurnee Smollett	Letitia "Leti" Lewis	Lovecraft Country	"Holy Ghost"	HBO
2022 (74th)	Zendaya	Rue Bennett	Euphoria	"Stand Still Like the Hummingbird"	HBO
2022 (74th)	Jodie Comer	Villanelle	Killing Eve	"Don't Get Eaten"	BBC America
2022 (74th)	Sandra Oh	Eve Polastri	Killing Eve	"Making Dead Things Look Nice"	BBC America
2022 (74th)	Laura Linney	Wendy Byrde	Ozark	"Pound of Flesh and Still Kickin'"	Netflix
2022 (74th)	Melanie Lynskey	Shauna Sadecki	Yellowjackets	"Doomcoming"	Showtime
2022 (74th)	Reese Witherspoon	Bradley Jackson	The Morning Show	"Confirmations"	Apple TV+
2023 (75th)	Sarah Snook	Shiv Roy	Succession	"Tailgate Party"	HBO
2023 (75th)	Sharon Horgan	Eva Garvey	Bad Sisters	"Saving Grace"	Apple TV+
2023 (75th)	Melanie Lynskey	Shauna Sadecki	Yellowjackets	"Burial"	Showtime
2023 (75th)	Elisabeth Moss	June Osborne	The Handmaid's Tale	"Safe"	Hulu
2023 (75th)	Bella Ramsey	Ellie	The Last of Us	"When We Are in Need"	HBO
2023 (75th)	Keri Russell	Kate Wyler	The Diplomat	"Lambs in the Dark"	Netflix
2024 (76th)
2024 (76th)	Anna Sawai	Toda Mariko	Shōgun	"Crimson Sky"	FX
2024 (76th)	Jennifer Aniston	Alex Levy	The Morning Show	"The Overview Effect"	Apple TV+
2024 (76th)	Carrie Coon	Bertha Russell	The Gilded Age	"Head to Head"	HBO
2024 (76th)	Maya Erskine	Jane Smith / Alana	Mr. & Mrs. Smith	"A Breakup"	Prime Video
2024 (76th)	Imelda Staunton	Queen Elizabeth II	The Crown	"Sleep, Dearie Sleep"	Netflix
2024 (76th)	Reese Witherspoon	Bradley Jackson	The Morning Show	"Love Island"	Apple TV+
2025 (77th)
2025 (77th)	Britt Lower	Helly R / Helena Eagan	Severance	"Attila"	Apple TV+
2025 (77th)	Kathy Bates	Madeline "Matty" Matlock	Matlock	"I Was That, Too"	CBS
2025 (77th)	Sharon Horgan	Eva Garvey	Bad Sisters	"Boom"	Apple TV+
2025 (77th)	Bella Ramsey	Ellie	The Last of Us	"Convergence"	HBO
2025 (77th)	Keri Russell	Kate Wyler	The Diplomat	"St. Paul's"	Netflix
2026 (78th)
2026 (78th)	Rhea Seehorn	Carol Sturka	Pluribus	"We Is Us"	Apple TV
2026 (78th)	Carrie Coon	Bertha Russell	The Gilded Age	"My Mind Is Made Up"	HBO
2026 (78th)	Chase Infiniti	Agnes MacKenzie	The Testaments	"Secateurs"	Hulu
2026 (78th)	Keri Russell	Kate Wyler	The Diplomat	"Schrodinger's Wife"	Netflix
2026 (78th)	Zendaya	Rue Bennett	Euphoria	"In God We Trust"	HBO

== Programs with multiple wins ==
6 wins

- Cagney & Lacey (consecutive)

3 wins

- The Loretta Young Show
- Mission: Impossible (consecutive)
- Picket Fences (2 consecutive)
- The Sopranos
- The Waltons (2 consecutive)

2 wins

- China Beach
- The Crown
- Damages
- Euphoria
- Father Knows Best
- The Good Wife
- Hazel
- Homeland (consecutive)
- Thirtysomething
- The West Wing

== Programs with multiple nominations ==
12 nominations

- Cagney & Lacey
- Murder, She Wrote (consecutive)

9 nominations

- The Sopranos

8 nominations

- Law & Order: Special Victims Unit

7 nominations

- ER
- Killing Eve
- L.A. Law

6 nominations

- The Crown
- Hill Street Blues
- House of Cards
- The Loretta Young Show
- Mad Men
- The Waltons

5 nominations

- The Closer
- Family
- Homeland
- Six Feet Under

4 nominations

- Alias
- Chicago Hope
- China Beach
- Dallas
- Damages
- Fame
- The Good Wife
- The Handmaid's Tale
- How to Get Away with Murder
- Mission: Impossible
- The Mod Squad
- The Morning Show
- Picket Fences
- The X-Files
- The West Wing

3 nominations

- The Americans
- The Big Valley
- Brothers & Sisters
- The Diplomat
- The Donna Reed Show
- Downton Abbey
- Euphoria
- Hazel
- I Love Lucy
- Lassie
- Orphan Black
- Our Miss Brooks
- Ozark
- Police Woman
- The Rockford Files
- Sisters

2 nominations

- The Avengers
- Bad Sisters
- The Beverly Hillbillies
- Charlie's Angels
- CSI: Crime Scene Investigation
- The Dick Van Dyke Show
- Dr. Quinn, Medicine Woman
- Dynasty
- Empire
- Father Knows Best
- Fireside Theatre
- Friday Night Lights
- The George Burns and Gracie Allen Show
- The Gilded Age
- Harry's Law
- Hart to Hart
- Here Come the Brides
- I'll Fly Away
- Judging Amy
- The Last of Us
- McMillan & Wife
- Medium
- Nurse
- Once and Again
- Private Secretary
- Saving Grace
- Scandal
- Thirtysomething
- Touched by an Angel
- The Trials of Rosie O'Neill
- Upstairs, Downstairs
- Westworld
- Yellowjackets

== Performers with multiple wins ==
4 wins

- Tyne Daly (3 consecutive)
- Michael Learned (2 consecutive)

3 wins

- Barbara Bain (consecutive)
- Kathy Baker (2 consecutive)
- Edie Falco
- Loretta Young

2 wins

- Glenn Close (consecutive)
- Claire Danes (consecutive)
- Dana Delany
- Sharon Gless (consecutive)
- Susan Hampshire (consecutive)
- Allison Janney
- Julianna Margulies
- Barbara Stanwyck
- Sela Ward
- Patricia Wettig (consecutive)
- Jane Wyatt
- Zendaya

== Performers with multiple nominations ==
12 nominations

- Angela Lansbury (consecutive)

9 nominations

- Elisabeth Moss

8 nominations

- Sharon Gless
- Mariska Hargitay (consecutive)
- Michael Learned
- Julianna Margulies

6 nominations

- Tyne Daly
- Claire Danes
- Edie Falco
- Keri Russell
- Robin Wright
- Loretta Young

5 nominations

- Glenn Close
- Veronica Hamel
- Kyra Sedgwick

4 nominations

- Debbie Allen
- Gillian Anderson
- Kathy Baker
- Frances Conroy
- Viola Davis
- Dana Delany
- Jill Eikenberry
- Jennifer Garner
- Allison Janney
- Christine Lahti
- Peggy Lipton
- Sandra Oh
- Barbara Stanwyck
- Sada Thompson

3 nominations

- Barbara Bain
- Kathy Bates
- Barbara Bel Geddes
- Lorraine Bracco
- Amy Brenneman
- Connie Britton
- Jan Clayton
- Jodie Comer
- Susan Dey
- Angie Dickinson
- Michelle Dockery
- Sally Field
- Laura Linney
- Tatiana Maslany
- Sherry Stringfield
- Sela Ward
- Zendaya

2 nominations

- Jennifer Aniston
- Patricia Arquette
- Joan Blondell
- Olivia Colman
- Carrie Coon
- Roma Downey
- Claire Foy
- Susan Hampshire
- Marg Helgenberger
- Taraji P. Henson
- Sharon Horgan
- Holly Hunter
- Kate Jackson
- Swoosie Kurtz
- Melanie Lynskey
- Jean Marsh
- Stefanie Powers
- Bella Ramsey
- Diana Rigg
- Susan Saint James
- Jane Seymour
- Regina Taylor
- Kerry Washington
- Patricia Wettig
- Reese Witherspoon
- Evan Rachel Wood
- Jane Wyman
- Jane Wyatt

== See also ==
- Actor Award for Outstanding Performance by a Female Actor in a Drama Series
- Best Actress
- Critics' Choice Television Award for Best Actress in a Drama Series
- Golden Globe Award for Best Actress – Television Series Drama
- List of acting awards
- List of television awards for Best Actress
- Primetime Emmy Award for Outstanding Lead Actor in a Comedy Series
- Primetime Emmy Award for Outstanding Lead Actress in a Comedy Series
- Primetime Emmy Award for Outstanding Supporting Actor in a Comedy Series
- Primetime Emmy Award for Outstanding Supporting Actress in a Comedy Series
- Primetime Emmy Award for Outstanding Lead Actor in a Drama Series
- Primetime Emmy Award for Outstanding Supporting Actor in a Drama Series
- Primetime Emmy Award for Outstanding Supporting Actress in a Drama Series
- Primetime Emmy Award for Outstanding Lead Actor in a Limited or Anthology Series or Movie
- Primetime Emmy Award for Outstanding Lead Actress in a Limited or Anthology Series or Movie
- Primetime Emmy Award for Outstanding Supporting Actor in a Limited or Anthology Series or Movie
- Primetime Emmy Award for Outstanding Supporting Actress in a Limited or Anthology Series or Movie
- TCA Award for Individual Achievement in Drama
