= Killing Eve: Die for Me =

2020 novel by Luke Jennings

- First edition cover
- Author: Luke Jennings
- Language: English
- Genre: Thriller; Spy; Mystery; Crime
- Publisher: John Murray
- Publication date: 9 April 2020
- Publication place: United Kingdom
- Media type: Print (hardback and paperback); Audiobook; E-book
- Pages: 240
- ISBN: 978-1-529-35151-4
- Preceded by: Killing Eve: No Tomorrow

Killing Eve: Die for Me is a 2020 thriller novel by British author Luke Jennings. It is the third installment in the Killing Eve series, following Codename Villanelle (2017) and Killing Eve: No Tomorrow (2018). The novel was published in the United Kingdom by John Murray as an e-book on 9 April 2020, followed by hardcover and paperback versions on 11 June and 12 November 2020, respectively. The novels are the basis of the BBC America television series Killing Eve (2018–2022).

== Background ==
The first novel in the series, Codename Villanelle, is a compilation of four serial e-book novellas published between 2014 and 2016, and the sequel novel Killing Eve: No Tomorrow was published in 2018. Villanelle is a Russian orphan who, after murdering the killers of her gangster father, was rescued from prison by The Twelve and trained as a hitwoman and compensated with a luxurious life in the West. Villanelle becomes the quarry of British intelligence agent Eve Polastri.

Killing Eve: Die for Me was originally announced in July 2019 under the title Killing Eve: Endgame.

== Premise ==
Preview synopsis includes: "As Villanelle returns to face her childhood demons and the Russian winter, Eve finds herself on the run from The Twelve, who want her dead. As the action moves between London and St Petersburg, and Eve and Villanelle finally admit their mutual erotic obsession, the chess game approaches its lethal, unforgettable conclusion."

== The Killing Eve television adaptation ==
The television series Killing Eve stars Sandra Oh as Polastri and Jodie Comer as Villanelle. The show received critical praise, being renewed for a second season before its series 1 premiere and being renewed for a third series approximately 12 hours after the series 2 premiere.

Though the book is said to "diverge pretty clearly" from the television show, they still "share common DNA" because of Jennings' collaboration with the show's creators, the author remarking that he enjoys how the show's story line "entwines" with his own.
