= Codename Villanelle =

2017 novel by Luke Jennings

- First edition cover
- Author: Luke Jennings
- Language: English
- Genre: Thriller; Spy; Mystery; Crime
- Publisher: John Murray
- Publication date: 29 June 2017
- Publication place: United Kingdom
- Media type: Print (hardcover and paperback); Audiobook; E-book
- Pages: 224
- ISBN: 978-1-473-66638-2
- Followed by: Killing Eve: No Tomorrow

Codename Villanelle is a 2017 thriller novel by British author Luke Jennings. A compilation of four serial e-book novellas published from 2014 to 2016, the novel was published in the United Kingdom by John Murray as an e-book on 29 June 2017, followed by hardcover and paperback versions on 24 August 2017. Codename Villanelle is the basis of the BBC America/BBC Three television series Killing Eve (2018–2022).

== Premise ==
Villanelle is a Russian orphan who, after murdering the killers of her gangster father, is rescued from prison and trained as a hitwoman by a shadowy group called The Twelve. Codename Villanelle has been summarized as pitting "heartless female assassin" Villanelle against "dowdy but dogged MI5 agent" Eve Polastri, the two women "battling it out at a distance" as Polastri seeks clues at a series of killing sites.

== Character background ==
Jennings stated that he based Villanelle's character on Idoia López Riaño, a hitwoman for the Basque nationalist paramilitary group ETA who was convicted of murdering 23 people in the 1990s. Jennings described Riaño—nicknamed La Tigresa (The Tigress) for her "legendary sexual prowess"—as a "psychopath" and "completely without empathy."

== Novella series ==
Codename Villanelle is a compilation of four serial Kindle edition novellas:

Villanelle

"Men or women who are born, as you were, without a conscience or the ability to feel guilt ... without you, without predators—people who can think the unthinkable and act without fear or hesitation—the world stands still. You are an evolutionary necessity."

— Villanelle's handler Konstantin
Codename Villanelle chapter 1
1. Codename Villanelle (published 4 February 2014; 36 pages). Star linguistics student Oxana Vorontsova's multiple brutal murders attract the notice of a secret global power elite, which recruits her as an assassin with the codename Villanelle and rewards her with a luxurious lifestyle.
2. Villanelle: Hollowpoint (published 3 August 2014; 56 pages). Villanelle's pattern of assassinations draws the attention of a highly intelligent MI5 agent, Eve Polastri, who pursues Villanelle relentlessly.
3. Villanelle: Shanghai (published 3 February 2015; 49 pages). The "beautiful and sexually predatory... psychopath" Villanelle's next assignment takes her to Shanghai, where, regardless of personal cost to herself, Polastri fiercely pursues the assassin.
4. Odessa (published 14 June 2016; 48 pages). As Villanelle prepares to break into a fortified mansion in Odesa, Ukraine, where her mentor is held hostage, a breakthrough leads agent Polastri in determined pursuit.

== Critical response ==
In The Times, John Dugdale likened Villanelle's character to the title character from Luc Besson's 1990 film La Femme Nikita—a former teenage killer transformed into a trained assassin. Dugdale further likened author Luke Jennings to James Bond author Ian Fleming: "at once tongue-in-cheek and serious, paying obsessive attention to the details of both Villanelle's chichi lifestyle and her lethal assignments." Though calling "Jennings' version of 007"—Villanelle—"great fun", Dugdale wrote that the "imperfectly integrated" novella series was repetitious and lacked a "proper denouement".

Jeff Noon wrote in The Spectator that the book "reads a little like Terry Hayes’s I Am Pilgrim in miniature". Noon added that Jennings focused more on "hunting and killing" than on character building and that the book, though having final pages that are thrilling, ends without a final resolution. Similarly, trade magazine Publishers Weekly praised the book as an "exceptional spy thriller" with "superior prose" and "cracker jack plot", noting its "wide-open ending points to more to come in the struggle between these two resourceful antagonists".

== Television adaptation ==
Killing Eve was created by British actor and writer Phoebe Waller-Bridge and produced by Sid Gentle Films Ltd for BBC America. In addition to writing for the television series, Waller-Bridge was chosen as executive producer with Sally Woodward Gentle and Lee Morris. The television series stars Sandra Oh as Polastri and Jodie Comer as Villanelle. The show was renewed for a second series before its series 1 debut on 8 April 2018, then renewed for a third series the day after the premiere of series 2. The fourth and final season of the show premiered in 2022.

== Sequels ==
Due to the success of the television adaptation, a sequel, Killing Eve: No Tomorrow, was published on 25 October 2018. The third and final volume, Killing Eve: Die for Me, was released on 9 April 2020. As both were published after the premiere of the TV series, the new books carry the Killing Eve branding.

== Literary rights ==
Publishing industry magazine The Bookseller reported in April 2017 that John Murray bought the novel just before the London Book Fair, subsequently selling North American rights to Josh Kendall at Mulholland Books, an imprint of Little, Brown and Company, during the fair. World English rights were acquired from Patrick Walsh at PEW Literary Agency.
