= Killing Eve: No Tomorrow =

2018 novel by Luke Jennings

- First edition cover
- Author: Luke Jennings
- Language: English
- Genre: Thriller; Spy; Mystery; Crime
- Publisher: John Murray
- Publication date: 25 October 2018
- Publication place: United Kingdom
- Media type: Print (hardback and paperback); Audiobook; E-book
- Pages: 256
- ISBN: 978-1-473-67656-5
- Preceded by: Codename Villanelle
- Followed by: Killing Eve: Die for Me

Killing Eve: No Tomorrow is a 2018 thriller novel by British author Luke Jennings and the second installment in the Killing Eve series, following Codename Villanelle (2017). It was published in the United Kingdom by John Murray on 25 October 2018. The novels are the basis of the BBC America television series Killing Eve (2018–2022).

== Background ==
The preceding novel, Codename Villanelle, is a compilation of four serial e-book novellas published from 2014 to 2016. Villanelle is a Russian orphan who, after murdering the killers of her gangster father, was rescued from prison by The Twelve and trained as a hitwoman and compensated with a luxurious life in the West. Villanelle becomes the quarry of British intelligence agent Eve Polastri.

Killing Eve: No Tomorrow was originally announced in May 2018 under the title Villanelle: No Tomorrow.

== Premise ==
In her global travels in pursuit of Villanelle, Eve Polastri experiences "luxuries most...don't even know enough to dream about". Villanelle learns that Eve has discovered The Twelve is paying a senior MI5 officer, whom Eve interrogates to try to fit the pieces of the puzzle together. Villanelle helps the MI5 officer turn the tables on Eve, and the two women continue their duel and sustain their mutual obsession. When Villanelle learns that Eve is her next target, Villanelle begins to suspect that The Twelve will soon turn on her, too—unless the two women can work together to foil their plot.

Villanelle, upon receiving an assignment

As always, now that she is in play, Villanelle is serene. There's a sense of things falling into place, as if impelled by gravity. All leading up to the kill, that moment of absolute power. The dark rapture flowing into every vestige of her being, filling and possessing her utterly.

— Killing Eve: No Tomorrow
Part 4

== Critical response ==
Kevin Howell wrote in Shelf Awareness that No Tomorrow is a "faster, funnier and more exciting", and less episodic, than Codename Villanelle, adding that the sequel "brilliantly walks the line between thriller and spoof" though "some of the tongue-in-cheek James Bond action goes past overkill". A Publishers Weekly review said that the book was pallid and, including standard genre tropes, lacks the appeal of the television series, though indicating that "many fans of the TV series will want to check this one out". In the Evening Standard Mark Sanderson derisively characterized these two books as "spoofs" of the work of Ian Fleming and John le Carré and said they include "camp nonsense", though writing that Jennings' "tales of Sapphic slapstick work better on the page" than in the "overrated" show. Kirkus Reviews said that this "slender novella has many of the same satisfactions" and shortcomings as its prequel, adding that its "action is brisk", but that Polastri's obsession with Villanelle is not adequately explained and the book's "use of sexuality as a character trait" began to feel "uncomfortable". " Alison Flood wrote in The Guardian that the book is "a ridiculous amount of fun, held together by Jennings's black humour and sense of the absurd".

== Television adaptation ==
The television series Killing Eve cast Sandra Oh as Polastri and Jodie Comer as Villanelle. The show received critical praise, being renewed for a second season before its first-season premiere and being renewed for a third season about twelve hours after the second-season premiere.

Though the book is said to "diverge pretty clearly" from the television show, they still "share common DNA" because of Jennings' collaboration with the show's creators, the author remarking that he enjoys how the show's story line "entwines" with his own.
