= Eve Polastri =

Fictional character from the 2018 novel Codename Villanelle

- Killing Eve character
- Sandra Oh as Eve Polastri
- First appearance: Novel series: Codename Villanelle (2014); Television series: "Nice Face" (2018)
- Last appearance: Novel series: Killing Eve: Die for Me (2020); Television series: "Hello, Losers" (2022)
- Created by: Luke Jennings
- Adapted by: Phoebe Waller-Bridge
- Portrayed by: Sandra Oh

In-universe information
- Gender: Female
- Occupation: Intelligence officer, agent
- Affiliation: British intelligence (MI5, later MI6)
- Spouse: Niko Polastri (estranged)
- Significant other: Villanelle
- Nationality: British (novels); American (television series)

Eve Polastri is a fictional agent working for British intelligence, and the titular character of the "Killing Eve" novel series, and its television adaptation.

British author Luke Jennings originally created Polastri's character in an e-book novella series whose segments were published from 2014 through 2016, the series being compiled into the 2018 novel Codename Villanelle, which was followed by a 2019 sequel, Killing Eve: No Tomorrow.

In the novel's BBC America television series adaptation Killing Eve (2018—2022), the character is portrayed by actress Sandra Oh.

== Background ==
Eve Polastri is a lead character in Luke Jennings' four-segment novella series (2014–2016), whose compilation forms his 2018 novel Codename Villanelle. The 2018—2022 television series Killing Eve, created by British writer-actor Phoebe Waller-Bridge, is based on Jennings' novellas. In the television series, Polastri was born in the U.K., allowing her to hold a British government job, but raised in the U.S., explaining her North American accent. Actress Maya Rudolph said in 2022 that she had been offered the part, but turned it down because filming was to take place in Europe.

== In Killing Eve ==
Eve Polastri is an MI5 security operative whose job as "an intelligence agency grunt" once involved more paper pushing than intrigue, her intellectual curiosity going unrewarded and underemployed by her superiors. After being called into a meeting about a recent assassination, Polastri speculates that the killer is a woman, and, after a series of plot twists, the deskbound MI5 agent suddenly becomes an MI6 foreign intelligence operative tasked with finding the killer.

Polastri becomes involved in a cat-and-mouse game with the psychopathic hired assassin Villanelle (portrayed by Jodie Comer), the two women becoming mutually obsessed and sharing what has been called a "crackling chemistry... between bitter enemies and would-be lovers". Agent Polastri tracks assassin Villanelle across Europe, not as hero and villain but as "two broken women whose flaws bind them together in a twisted pas de deux."

== Characterization ==
Gazing at an image of
Villanelle perfume

Gazing at the tiny image on the screen, Eve feels her certainties shifting. ... She is not as immune to luxury and the purely sensual things of life as she once thought. Venice at nightfall, the weightless caress of the Laura Fracci dress, the touch of a six-thousand-euro bracelet on her wrist. All so seductive, and all in some essential sense so corrupt, so cruel.

— Killing Eve: No Tomorrow
(Luke Jennings novel, Part 5)

Polastri has been described as a competent professional going through "a bizarre, uncontrollable awakening" and as an "awkward, smart, not entirely self-aware woman with an impressive mass of curly hair". Though Polastri initially presents as if she were a comedic supporting character, her "steeliness" and other strengths manifest, even in situations in which Villanelle has the upper hand. Her "instincts and resolve have to make up for her inexperience and her tendency to scream like a terrified child in the face of danger". Polastri "remains bound to the notion of being right and doing right", and is much more down to earth and approachable than conventional crime-solver characters. Series creator Phoebe Waller-Bridge said that Polastri is an "Everywoman" to whom people can relate, wanting an easy life but craving an extraordinary one.

Actor Sandra Oh remarked that Polastri lacks super-spy skills and James Bond gadgets, but has good instincts and general sense, a head on her shoulders and determination. Though Oh said that honesty is Polastri's superpower, the character has been described as being "cursed with zero poker-face game, a hilarious liability for a spy". While characterized as "a highly capable hot mess, the kind of unlikely hero who's always just on the edge of moral ruination", Polastri's determination is said to make up for her lack of guile. Polastri is "Clarice Starling or Sherlock Holmes, but she's also Lucy Ricardo or Selina Meyer".

I'm like you now

"You think we'd be what? Bonnie and Clyde? Just go on a killing spree, cut a few throats? You want me to be a mess. You want me to be scared. But I'm like you now. I'm not afraid of anything. This is what you wanted."

— Eve Polastri, after Villanelle
proposed the two should
live together in Alaska

Writer-showrunner Phoebe Waller-Bridge explained that Polastri has a "sense of self-consciousness and guilt" that cripples her—a perfect counterpoint to Villanelle, who, as Ashley Boucher noted in TheWrap, only does things that might bring joy. Jia Tolentino wrote in The New Yorker that the way Polastri "slips in and out of the register of self-humiliation is one of the show's great delights".

Though having a nice job and a loving partner, Polastri has been described as bored and impatient. Her obsession with Villanelle is "rooted in the potential of an alternate lifestyle" and "opens up an entry point into a new life" and Polastri is "flirting not only with another person but also with a version of herself that she sees reflected through Villanelle".

Actor Sandra Oh remarked that Polastri's "darkness is not apparent at the very beginning (but) as her relationship (with Villanelle) continues to grow, ... she really discovers what's inside of herself. ... So (if) your question is, would it be more fun to play the psychopath?, well, who says I'm not?"

After series 2, Oh described how there are things Polastri believes she cannot do, but she actually does, though she must deal with the resulting trauma. Polastri "draws the line", not only with Carolyn (showing loyalty to Villanelle after they use Villanelle to carry out their plans) but also with Villanelle (walking away from Villanelle when she asserts "I love you... You're mine"). It was observed that Eve's axe killing of Raymond turns the show's title on its head: is Villanelle "killing Eve" or is it that "Eve became 'killing Eve'—an Eve who kills?"

== Social, thematic and creative context ==
Judy Berman noted in The New York Times that while men in Killing Eve play traditionally female roles, Polastri and Villanelle's characters differ from those in conventional spy thrillers, which almost never cast women as both cat and mouse, both hero and villain. In this context, series showrunner Phoebe Waller-Bridge added that these particular women "don't even have to see each other to feel each other's presence", their connection being more complex than romantic relationships: "It's sexual, it's intellectual, it's aspirational."

Observing that both Villanelle and Eve's worlds "betrayed and deceived them at every turn", Melanie McFarland in Salon delved into the women's complex relationship and wrote that their story "explores the kind of trickiness involved in navigating the world as a woman"; despite the growing connection, the "sisterhood" is "devoid of guarantees". Series creator Phoebe Waller-Bridge remarked that she "loved experimenting with how women can [expletive] each other up".

Willa Paskin wrote in Slate that Killing Eve is a story about "the literal dangers of underestimating women", including both Villanelle and Polastri: "of not seeing the woman who can kill you, underestimating the woman who can stop her."

Matt Zoller Seitz noted in Vulture that Oh's Korean heritage was "refreshingly incidental" to her part, and, like Eve's Canadian accent, is not central to the story but makes the show "feel as if it's been warped in from some future date where colorblind casting is expected".

One commentator said that Eve changed, "moving closer and closer to Villanelle and her world" in Season 2. Second season showrunner Emerald Fennell commented that Polastri's "incredibly violent" ax killing of Raymond is important since the audience needs to feel how "unbelievably distressing and violent and horrible" it would be to kill someone "if you don't know what you're doing". Fennell claimed to show the killing as "far more honest and weird and distressing than what we expect", adding that "particularly for women, ... we spend so much of our time hiding how we feel, particularly when it comes to sex and anger and all those kinds of dark emotions".

== Portrayal ==
In June 2018, Sandra Oh was selected as the best actress on television by Vulture (a New York magazine-branded pop culture website). Vulture commentator Matt Zoller Seitz wrote that Oh's "is the performance of the year so far, in any medium. ... this is quietly revolutionary acting on a quietly revolutionary series". Seitz added that Polastri shows the most character growth of all the characters, and anchors the story to make the comedy-thriller "genre fusion" appear established and credible.

For her performance, Oh was nominated in the summer of 2018 for the Primetime Emmy Award for Outstanding Lead Actress in a Drama Series, becoming the first actress of Asian descent to be nominated for a lead actress Emmy. Oh was nominated for the same award in 2019.

Oh received various other awards for her portrayal of Polastri, including the Critics' Choice Television Award for Best Actress in a Drama Series, the 25th Annual Screen Actors Guild Award for Outstanding Performance by a Female Actor in a Drama Series, the Golden Globe Award for Best Actress – Television Series Drama, the Gracie Award for Actress in a Leading Role – Drama, and was nominated for various other awards.

The New York Times included Oh's and Comer's performances in its "Best Performances of 2018", noting "these two women are inventive about how to be funny in a thriller" and "make run-of-the mill embarrassment seem more lethal than any bullet". TV Guide named Oh's and Comer's performances as the No. 2 Best TV Performances of 2018.
