= Luke Jennings =

English author and dance critic

- Born: 1953 (age 72–73)
- Education: Rambert School
- Occupations: Author, dance critic, journalist
- Writing career
- Genres: Thriller, memoir, youth fiction

Luke Jennings (born 1953) is a British author, dance critic and journalist.

== Early life, family and education ==
Jennings father, Michael Jennings, was a cavalry commander in World War II. He survived the war, but was badly burned after trying to rescue a comrade from a burning tank, resulting in him being awarded the Military Cross.

Jennings was born in 1953 and became the eldest of eleven children, including Christian Jennings and Martin Jennings. He attended Avisford, a Catholic preparatory school started by his own father in West Sussex. He is married and his wife Nicky is an art historian.

Jennings trained as a dancer at the Rambert School and was one of the students of the Expressionist and Integrated dance pedagogue Hilde Holger. Jennings studied Indian languages.

== Career ==
Jennings produced and directed a Channel 4 documentary filmed in Bombay.

As a journalist, Jennings has written for Vanity Fair and The New Yorker, and he has reported from locations around the world, including Moscow. He was a dance critic for The Observer and has written dance-related articles for Time.

== Published works ==
Jennings's first novel, Breach Candy (1993), follows a recently retired ballerina and an intelligent-but-wounded television director researching a Channel 4 documentary in Mumbai.

Jennings's novel, Atlantic (1995), which takes place in a cruise ship in the post-war years, was nominated for the Booker Prize.

Beauty Story (1998) is a novel about a young actress who vanishes from a 16th-century English castle where she was filming a fragrance commercial.

The acknowledgements section in At Risk (2004) by Stella Rimington indicates that it was written with the help of Luke Jennings: "Huge thanks are also due to Luke Jennings whose help with the research and the writing made it all happen."

Blood Knots: Of Fathers, Friendship and Fishing—a 2010 memoir about fishing, and about "childhood innocence, paternal love, and his friendship with the charismatic, enigmatic" man (Robert Nairac) who was later killed by the IRA while working as an intelligence officer in Ireland—was shortlisted for the 2010 BBC Samuel Johnson Prize and for the William Hill prize.

With his daughter, Jennings co-wrote the Stars youth fiction series (circa 2013), about teenagers at a performing arts school.

Jennings co-authored The Faber Pocket Guide to Ballet (2014).

Jennings's 2017 book Codename Villanelle, a compilation of four serial Kindle edition novellas published between 2014 and 2016, was the basis for BBC America's Killing Eve television series. Though his 2018 sequel Killing Eve: No Tomorrow diverged from the television show, the books and show are said to "share common DNA" because of Jennings's continued collaboration with the show's creators. Subsequent installments in the Villanelle series include, in chronological order, Killing Eve: Die For Me, released on March 19, 2020, Killing Eve: Resurrection, released on June 2, 2025, and the upcoming fifth installment, Killing Eve: Long Shot released on November 1, 2025.

“Homecoming”, a short story by Jennings, is in Lifelines—An Anthology of Angling Anecdotes, and More… (NAROD Publishing, 2021), a collection of 27 short stories by 27 different authors concerning angling.

== See also ==
- Eve Polastri
- Villanelle (character)
