= Idoia López Riaño =

ETA member

Idoia López Riaño is a former ETA assassin nicknamed "La Tigresa" (The Tigress) for her "sexual prowess". She was jailed in the 1990s for a string of murders for the Basque terror group. Riaño eventually expressed remorse for her crimes, and was released in 2017 after 23 years in jail (one year served for each of her victims).

== Biography ==
Idoia López Riaño was born in San Sebastián on March 18, 1964. It has been said she lived a relatively normal life with a good family and education. Riaño was recruited to join ETA when she was 16 in 1980 by her boyfriend, José Ángel Aguirre Aguirre. At the time, this was the main Basque nationalist group and continued to become increasingly violent as Spanish authorities went after independent campaigners.

She became well known for using her beauty to lure police officers into her bed to gather information for ETA to aid in planning their raids.

== Murders ==
At the age of 20, La Tigresa carried out her first political murder on November 16, 1984. Along with two co-conspirators, Aguirre Aguirre, his fellow ETA officer Ramón Zapirain, the three travelled to Irun and accused French citizen Joseph Couchot of being a member of GAL. Shortly after, he was killed in a hail of bullets.

She was a lieutenant in the Madrid ETA cell and on July 14, 1986 they detonated a car bomb in the Plaza de la Republican Dominicana in Madrid killing 12 civil guards.

In 1986, she and other members of the ETA used machine guns to shoot up the vehicle of an army commander, Ricardo Saenz de Ynestrillas Martinez, killing him.

In total, she was charged with the murders of 23 people between 1984 and 1986.

== Arrest ==
On August 28, 1994 in Aix-en-Provence, both Riaño and her boyfriend, Olivier Lammotte were arrested. She spent 5 years in a French prison before she was extradited to Spain for her conviction of the 23 murders.

== Court Proceedings and Sentencing ==
In 2002, she was sentenced to over 2,000 years in prison for her crimes. During the proceedings she told the court: "While you persist in thinking that we are going to assimilate into this monstrosity of a state, we will go on fighting until you leave Euskal Herria [the Basque homeland] in peace."

She married twice in prison and signed the “nanclares” declaration renouncing violence and apologising to her victims, a move that saw her expelled from ETA but which enabled her release in 2017. She is now at liberty at the age of 56.

== Media References ==
Various newspapers have reported that author Luke Jennings had revealed the character of Villanelle, the main antagonist of his Killing Eve series, was based upon Riaño. Jennings had said that Riaño, who had killed 23 people, "was clearly a psychopath, completely without empathy".
