= Villanelle (character) =

Fictional assassin

- Killing Eve character
- Jodie Comer as Villanelle
- First appearance: Novel series: Codename Villanelle (2014); Television series: "Nice Face" (2018)
- Last appearance: Novel series: Killing Eve: Die for Me (2020); Television series: "Hello, Losers" (2022)
- Created by: Luke Jennings
- Adapted by: Phoebe Waller-Bridge
- Portrayed by: Jodie Comer

In-universe information
- Full name: Birth names: Oxana Vorontsova (in Codename Villanelle); Oksana Astankova (in Killing Eve)
- Gender: Female
- Occupation: Assassin
- Affiliation: The Twelve (former)
- Significant other: Eve Polastri
- Nationality: Russian

Villanelle, birth name Oxana Vorontsova or Oksana Astankova is a fictional character and the main antagonist in Luke Jennings' novel Codename Villanelle (2018), its sequels Killing Eve: No Tomorrow (2019), Killing Eve: Die for Me (2020), Killing Eve: Resurrection (2025) and Killing Eve: Long Shot (November 2025) and the BBC America television series adaptation Killing Eve (2018–2022) in which she is portrayed by English actress Jodie Comer. She is a psychopathic assassin who works for a crime syndicate called The Twelve, and the archenemy of British intelligence agent Eve Polastri. Their mutually obsessive relationship is the main focus of both the novels and the TV series. The character and Comer's performance have received critical acclaim, with Villanelle being considered the show's breakout character.

== Background ==
Villanelle is the title character in Luke Jennings' four-segment novella series (2014–2016), whose compilation forms his 2018 novel Codename Villanelle. The 2018–2022 television series Killing Eve, created by British writer-actor Phoebe Waller-Bridge, is based on Jennings' novellas.

Jennings stated that he based Villanelle's character on Idoia López Riaño, a hitwoman for Basque separatist group ETA who was convicted of murdering 23 people in the 1990s. Jennings described López Riaño—nicknamed La Tigresa (The Tigress) for her "legendary sexual prowess"—as a "psychopath" and "completely without empathy."

To further develop the Villanelle character for television, Waller-Bridge applied her impressions from her interview of Angela Simpson, an Arizona woman who had imprisoned, tortured and murdered a victim, and who—though affectless during the interview—afterward erupted with exuberant, giddy pride at her own performance. Waller-Bridge, Comer, and director Harry Bradbeer drew inspiration from a 2016 Spike Jonze perfume-commercial dancer (played by Margaret Qualley) who was overtaken by an alien force that liberated her from societal expectations, and who became playful and enthusiastic—and unpredictable. Bradbeer also applied his appreciation of the Coen brothers' characteristic blend of comedy and terror, crafting characters who are most chilling when behaving almost normally and who are most dangerous when acting happy, innocent, playful and naughty.

=== Name ===
Some commentators conjecture the name Villanelle was derived from the word villainess. In The New Yorker, Jia Tolentino likened the entire Killing Eve series to the villanelle poetic form, writing that the show is about the "iteration of a recognizable pattern, its pleasures emerging in the internal twists".

In the novel, assassin Oxana Vorontsova chose her cover name as Villanelle, after a favourite perfume of the Comtesse du Barry who was guillotined in 1793 ("I shall have to be careful, then," said Oxana). In the television series, she taunts British intelligence agent Eve Polastri by sending her a bottle of perfume called La Villanelle.

Separately, a perfume named Villanelle had been produced in Belgium in the month preceding Killing Eve's television debut, the perfume's maker saying the name was inspired by Keith Douglas' 1940 poem "Villanelle of Spring Bells". The perfume maker noted an influx of orders from the U.S. after the show's American debut.

== In Killing Eve ==
Villanelle is a brutal hired assassin who soon becomes involved in a cat-and-mouse game with MI5 intelligence operative Eve Polastri (Sandra Oh), the two women becoming mutually obsessed and sharing what has been called a "crackling chemistry... between bitter enemies and would-be lovers". Agent Polastri tracks the "utterly unforgivable" assassin Villanelle across Europe, not as hero and villain but as "two broken women whose flaws bind them together in a twisted pas de deux." As the series progresses, Villanelle's backstory is revealed: she is an orphan with a violent reputation, who once developed an obsession for a nurturing older language teacher named Anna (Susan Lynch), with whom she had an affair. The affair ended when a jealous Villanelle castrated Anna's husband and murdered him to eliminate her love rival.

Five years after going to prison for the murder, Villanelle is recruited as an assassin by a criminal organisation called The Twelve, that helps her escape, fake her own death, and emerge with a new identity. She works with her handler, Konstantin Vasiliev (Kim Bodnia), with whom she has a kind of father-daughter relationship punctuated by occasional violence.

== Characterisation ==
Reflecting on one who loved her

... for a moment, Villanelle envies that capacity... to share another's happiness, to suffer another's pain, to fly on the wings of real feeling rather than to be forever acting. But how dangerous, how uncontrollable, and ultimately how ordinary. Better, by far, to occupy the pure, arctic citadel of the self.

— Killing Eve: No Tomorrow
(Luke Jennings novel, Part 7)
Words to a murder victim

"Your eyes will just empty. Then your soul goes in. People think your soul or personality, whatever, leaves the body when you die; I swear it just goes further in. It falls so far in and just... just becomes so small that it can't control your body anymore. It's just in there, tiny, forever."

— Villanelle, Killing Eve Season 1
Truth and feeling

Eve: "You said you don't want anything, you don't like anything, that you're bored. Do you mean it?"

Villanelle: Hm. I don't know."

Eve: "You don't know if you're telling the truth or not?"

Villanelle: "... Not really."

Eve: "You don't feel anything?"

Villanelle: "I feel things when I'm with you."

— Killing Eve Season 2

Villanelle has been described as "a manic pixie dream assassin who's as charming as she is psychopathic", a "chillingly relatable monster" who takes "fulsome pleasure in a murder well performed". Not simply a hired assassin, Villanelle was described as "taking joy in the pain of others" and having "no moral fetters holding her back", having been "raised to kill without guilt or concern, ... love or loyalty". An innocent exterior hides cold brutality, and Villanelle—a "living, breathing, shopping psychopath"—"kills with flair". She is "exceptionally gifted, completely soulless, and odd-duck hilarious ... rude, funny, awful, naughty. She's twisted and conscienceless, but she is also irrepressible. She's a proper psychopath."

Playing cat-and-mouse games on an intellectual and psychological level, Villanelle is "hyperaware of ... the narrative" surrounding her but then defies it, first leading interactions to make them appear predictable but then upending them. Despite having deep psychological damage from her past, the "playful" Villanelle not only has a "wicked sense of humor" but, being "just plain bored", craves stimulation and challenge, causing her to take risks while expressing her playfulness in "creative and showy murder". Though Villanelle's competence is "frightening" and "exaggerated", Jia Tolentino wrote in The New Yorker that she is "essentially a child, petulant and silly and rude", but whose "theatrical instincts flare back to life" in a deadly situation. Tolentino also inferred that Villanelle may be "unravelling" or replaying childhood events: demanding her handler admit he loves her more than his daughter; having lost her mother early and now looking for an older woman for mutual care and devotion; seeking praise for her brilliant performance.

Villanelle has also been described as cocky, playful, ostentatious, and possessing a beauty constituting a "rather literally weaponized femininity" that is alluring both to Eve and to audiences. Cold, calculating, and callous, she "attracts sympathy and then immediately deploys it against whomever she faces." Villanelle is a "complexly written, deeply frustrating character", and "nearly impossible to not root for" despite lacking the likability that conventionally is the goal for female characters. She shows moments of questioning but never surrenders to regret. Lacking moral impetus or guiding principle for her killing decisions and motivated by bloodlust, greed and spite, "Villanelle's dysfunction is her own". On RogerEbert.com, Brian Tallerico called her "TV's most fascinating serial killer".

Villanelle "offers a window into a life most women never get the chance to lead, a life defined by pure female desire and rage unfettered by financial worries, domestic obligations, and the quotidian violence of men." She is "wild and wildly self-possessed. ... She tries on identities the way other people try on clothes". Though she "acts as televisual wish fulfillment, a touching melancholy comes to the surface ... suggesting that (she) doesn't consume with such hearty gusto out of a simple lust for life but from a need to fill the void inside her".

Series creator Phoebe Waller-Bridge explained how her crafting of Villanelle's character resulted from continually asking, "What would you do if you weren't afraid?" Waller-Bridge endorsed that "Villanelle does have fun, choosing to only do things that might bring her joy"—from selecting haute couture to contriving murder techniques—a fearlessness that is a perfect counterpoint to the self-consciousness and guilt that cripples Eve in the first season.

Actress Jodie Comer described her character as a free spirit, not self-conscious at all, likening Villanelle during her acts of murder to a cat playing with a mouse before going in for the kill. Comer said that Villanelle "definitely prefers women" and, more broadly, "doesn't have any limitations at all" though deep-down craving a normal life like Eve's. Comer related that though Villanelle "thinks she knows what love is and what feelings are", she "knows that there's something missing in her, and that leads to seeking out the love she sees that others have"—especially what Polastri has with her husband. Hanh Nguyen commented in IndieWire that Villanelle "can only mimic the actions of others in hopes to achieve the same result", though noting that "psychopaths–and especially Villanelle–are able to draw people in through the sheer force of their confidence and personality".

Speaking about series 2's climax when Villanelle pleads with Eve to join her in an idyllic life together ("I love you. ... I do – you're mine! ... You are. You're mine!"), Sandra Oh praised Villanelle's vitality and power but described it as a "deeply immature disappointment" when people don't behave the way that you want.

== Social, thematic, and creative context ==
Observing that both Villanelle and Eve's worlds "betrayed and deceived them at every turn", Melanie McFarland in Salon delved into the women's complex relationship and wrote that their story "explores the kind of trickiness involved in navigating the world as a woman"; despite the growing connection, Villanelle knows how she can lure others and the "sisterhood" is "devoid of guarantees".

McFarland noted Villanelle's killing patterns and called the show "perfect for the #MeToo era," writing that it "slakes one's desire to see piggish misogynists get what's coming to them". However, writing in The Atlantic, Hannah Giorgis asserted that a feminist, political focus overlooks important thematic and aesthetic components: Villanelle subverts feminine stereotypes so as to "carve a jagged space into the serial-killer canon". Giorgis wrote that Villanelle violates "gendered expectations of violent behavior" of which women are supposedly incapable unless driven to it by trauma, and the character lacks the likability usually sought by the entertainment industry for female characters. Similarly, author Rachel Monroe wrote that "when a woman commits a crime, she's not only transgressing laws, she's transgressing gender roles".

Series creator Phoebe Waller-Bridge remarked that men in the show underestimate Villanelle, as men in the real world do not immediately assess the possible threat of women they meet in the same way that women do immediately calculate the possible threat of men they meet—an asymmetry that Waller-Bridge describes as "catnip for Villanelle". In accord, Willa Paskin wrote in Slate that "the disfigured, beating heart of Killing Eve is the way that Villanelle's gender and manner, her very femininity, keep our acculturated brains from being appropriately terrified of her." Describing how Villanelle "does what she always does: exploit society’s misogyny by imitating a victim of it", Emily Nussbaum wrote in The New Yorker that the potent idea that undergirds the show is that "femininity is itself a sort of sociopathy, whose performance, if you truly nail it, might be the source of ultimate power".

Psychiatrist Dr. Michael H. Stone and psychologist Dr. Gary Brucato concluded that Villanelle's character, who has been described as "not just remorseless and casually cruel, but also brilliant, charming, pragmatic, and, at times, genuinely thoughtful," is not typical of real-life female psychopaths, who usually kill as a result of earlier abuse rather than hereditary factors, often with motives involving money or attention, kill people they know, and do so "expeditiously" rather than torturously. Stone and Brucato conjectured that popular interest in Villanelle may derive from her "taking the weapon away from men" so that she "becomes a figure of power and appeal".

== Portrayal ==
Comer's performance in the role has received universal acclaim from critics. Hannah Giorgis wrote in The Atlantic that the "greatest success" of Killing Eve is how alluring it makes Villanelle – both to an intelligence agent dedicated to tracking her down and to the audience. More specifically, Jia Tolentino wrote in The New Yorker that Villanelle's character works because of Comer's "mercurial, unassailable charisma", and Willa Paskin wrote in Slate that Comer's Villanelle (twisted and conscienceless but also irrepressible) is "flat-out incredible". In The Irish Times, Peter Crawley characterised Comer's Villanelle as "a young woman with an angelic face and a devil's stare", adding that she embodies "a pleasing paradox: a phantom who craves recognition".

In December 2018, The New York Times included Oh's and Comer's performances in its "Best Performances of 2018", noting "these two women are inventive about how to be funny in a thriller" and "make run-of-the-mill embarrassment seem more lethal than any bullet". TV Guide named Oh's and Comer's performances at number 2 on their list of the Best TV Performances of 2018.

In May 2019, Hanh Nguyen wrote in IndieWire that Villanelle's ability "to shift from seemingly caring to cold and calculated in one breath as a reaction to how events change around her" is chilling, but Comer makes the transformation believable. Phoebe Waller-Bridge related that Comer "has a playfulness in her approach to Villanelle, which has inspired so much of the writing. She delivers the light and the dark with a fierce precision and has a mystique all her own".

For her portrayal of Villanelle in the first season, Comer received the British Academy Television Award for Best Actress at the 2019 British Academy Television Awards, and the Primetime Emmy Award for Outstanding Lead Actress in a Drama Series at the 71st Primetime Emmy Awards.

== See also ==
- Dries van Noten suit
- Molly Goddard pink dress
