= List of Killing Eve episodes =

Episodes from Killing Eve (2018)

Killing Eve is a spy thriller television series that premiered on BBC America in the United States on 8 April 2018. The series is based on the Villanelle novel series by Luke Jennings, and follows Eve Polastri (Sandra Oh), a British intelligence investigator tasked with capturing psychopathic assassin Villanelle (Jodie Comer); as the chase progresses, the two develop a mutual obsession.

In January 2020, it was renewed for a fourth and final season, which premiered on 27 February 2022.

== Series overview ==
Series of Killing Eve
Series	Episodes	Originally released	
Series	Episodes	First released	Last released
1	8	8 April 2018	27 May 2018
2	8	7 April 2019	26 May 2019
3	8	12 April 2020	31 May 2020
4	8	27 February 2022	10 April 2022

== Episodes ==
=== Series 1 (2018) ===
Killing Eve series 1 episodes
No. overall	No. in series	Title	Directed by	Written by	Original release date	U.S. viewers (millions)
1	1	"Nice Face"	Harry Bradbeer	Phoebe Waller-Bridge	8 April 2018	0.423
Psychopathic Villanelle—a young and prolific assassin—leaves a trail of high-profile murders across several countries. MI5 officer Eve Polastri connects a new assassination in Vienna to a series of such killings which she has been researching on her own time. Her theory that the assassin is a woman is dismissed by her superiors, but her unauthorised interview with the only witness confirms it. The witness is murdered while in a London hospital, along with a nurse and two guards, causing MI5 to fire Eve and her associate Bill. Impressed by Eve, Carolyn Martens, head of the Russia Section of MI6, recruits her for an off-the-books assignment to track the killer.
2	2	"I'll Deal with Him Later"	Harry Bradbeer	Phoebe Waller-Bridge	15 April 2018	0.371
Following her assignment in Bulgaria, Villanelle's handler Konstantin is concerned about her increasing recklessness. He informs her that a covert MI6 task force, led by Eve, is investigating her string of assassinations. Eve realises that a nurse she saw at the hospital before the murders may be the killer. Carolyn introduces Eve to Kenny (Carolyn's son) who has been gathering evidence on the assassinations, and allows Eve furthermore to recruit Elena and Bill as her assistants. Villanelle forms a relationship with her neighbour Sebastien and carries out another murder, of a successful parfumier, at a dinner party in Paris.
3	3	"Don't I Know You?"	Jon East	Vicky Jones	22 April 2018	0.388
Villanelle lures Eve to Berlin by using Eve's name while committing another murder, and trails Eve as she investigates it. Bill spots Villanelle and follows her to a nightclub. Before Eve can get to him, Villanelle stabs Bill repeatedly, killing him.
4	4	"Sorry Baby"	Jon East	George Kay	29 April 2018	0.503
Konstantin punishes Villanelle for her recent unpredictable behaviour by making her work with two other operatives: Nadia and Diego. The three are to assassinate Frank Haleton, Eve's former MI5 boss, whom Eve has discovered is a mole. Eve and Elena rush to Frank's rescue, while Villanelle manipulates Nadia into killing Diego, then runs over Nadia with Diego's car.
5	5	"I Have a Thing About Bathrooms"	Jon East	Phoebe Waller-Bridge	6 May 2018	0.518
Eve and Carolyn get Frank to a safe house, and he tells them that he is being paid by a shadow organisation "the Twelve" that uses Villanelle for purposeful destabilisation. There are hints that Elena and Kenny may have a romantic relationship. Villanelle breaks into Eve's home to talk to her and takes her phone, which Villanelle uses to track down Frank at the safe house and kill him. Konstantin tells Villanelle that Nadia is alive and has to be killed before she can be questioned.
6	6	"Take Me to the Hole!"	Damon Thomas	George Kay	13 May 2018	0.537
Eve and Carolyn track down Nadia to a Moscow prison, and are allowed to speak to her due to Carolyn's camaraderie with two Russian Intelligence officers, one of whom is Konstantin. Eve and Carolyn offer Nadia a deal, but before she can accept, she is killed by Villanelle, whom Konstantin had transferred to the prison for that purpose.
7	7	"I Don't Want to Be Free"	Damon Thomas	Rob Williams	20 May 2018	0.485
Eve investigates Anna, Villanelle's former teacher, with whom she had a deep relationship before Villanelle killed her husband. Villanelle is broken out from prison, meets her new handler, and is given her next target: Konstantin. Villanelle breaks into Konstantin's home but he escapes. Eve discovers that Carolyn secretly met Villanelle at the prison earlier that day before she escaped.
8	8	"God, I'm Tired"	Damon Thomas	Phoebe Waller-Bridge	27 May 2018	0.701
Konstantin goes to Carolyn and Eve for help, fearing for his and his daughter's lives. Villanelle goes to Anna for her passport and money. Eve had taken the passport and left her a note. Villanelle gets angry, but Anna kills herself before Villanelle can. Villanelle calls Eve to come to a cafe and bring her passport and Konstantin. Eve complies and a fight starts, during which Villanelle shoots Konstantin and escapes. Carolyn fires Eve from MI6, but Eve independently tracks down Villanelle to her Paris apartment. The pair confess their obsession with each other. Eve stabs Villanelle, who flees.

=== Series 2 (2019) ===
Killing Eve series 2 episodes
No. overall	No. in series	Title	Directed by	Written by	Original release date	U.S. viewers (millions)
9	1	"Do You Know How to Dispose of a Body?"	Damon Thomas	Emerald Fennell	7 April 2019	0.403
Continuing directly from the first series, Eve searches for the wounded Villanelle. Not finding her, Eve is called back to London to investigate a murder case believed to have been ordered by the Twelve. With her wounds now tended and eventually escaping the hospital, Villanelle has a rough time as she makes her way from a Paris hospital to London.
10	2	"Nice and Neat"	Damon Thomas	Emerald Fennell	14 April 2019	0.321
Eve meets her new team and deduces that the murderer is not Villanelle, but a new assassin for the Twelve whom she nicknames "the Ghost". Villanelle is close to London and tricks a man, Julian, into taking her to his home and helping her heal, but he tries to trap her at his house. After a few days, she escapes by killing him and meets her new handler, Raymond. Eve later discovers that Konstantin (presumed dead from being shot by Villanelle) is alive and now in hiding from the Twelve.
11	3	"The Hungry Caterpillar"	Lisa Brühlmann	Emerald Fennell and Henrietta & Jessica Ashworth	21 April 2019	0.361
Villanelle is ordered by Raymond to perform a clean assassination like the Ghost. She kills her target in a lift and delivers lipstick to Eve with the name "Love in an Elevator" to ensure that Eve knows who performed the assassination. Villanelle then reunites with Konstantin, who warns her that Raymond's only main purpose is to eliminate Villanelle since the Twelve no longer views her as useful and convinces her to work freelance as a pay-for-hire, adding that she'd be "her own boss". Meanwhile, Eve is struggling with balancing her job and her now strained relationship with Niko, who has a budding friendship with a teacher, Gemma who is secretly infatuated with him.
12	4	"Desperate Times"	Lisa Brühlmann	Emerald Fennell & D. C. Moore	28 April 2019	0.459
The Ghost's body count is much larger than expected and appears to be based around Aaron Peel. Villanelle tries to get Eve's attention with an assassination in Amsterdam based on The Corpses of the De Witt Brothers, but is angered when Eve does not show up to investigate.
13	5	"Smell Ya Later"	Francesca Gregorini	Freddy Syborn	5 May 2019	0.454
In a desperate attempt to get closer to Villanelle, Eve puts out a hit on herself, hiring Villanelle to do the job. There, Eve and Carolyn convinces Villanelle to assist them with their case. The Ghost is coerced by Villanelle into giving up information about who ordered the murder contract. Villanelle meets Niko and tells him about her and Eve in Paris.
14	6	"I Hope You Like Missionary!"	Francesca Gregorini	Jeremy Dyson	12 May 2019	0.402
Niko confronts Eve about what really happened in Paris. He then leaves and heads to Gemma's home. With new information about Aaron Peel, Villanelle (now involved in Eve and Carolyn's operation) goes undercover as a New Yorker named Billie to befriend Aaron's sister, Amber but there is conflict between Villanelle and Aaron.
15	7	"Wide Awake"	Damon Thomas	Emerald Fennell	19 May 2019	0.419
Aaron apologises to Villanelle and invites her to go to Rome. Villanelle interrogates Niko and locks him in a storage unit but not before killing Gemma, whilst Eve visits the psychologist before the trip. In Rome, Villanelle discovers Aaron's plans but Eve becomes jealous of their relationship.
16	8	"You're Mine"	Damon Thomas	Emerald Fennell	26 May 2019	0.367
Villanelle discovers one of the buyers in Aaron's scheme is Raymond and inadvertently uses the 'safe word'. Eve dresses as a cleaner in an attempt save Villanelle (assuming that Aaron is about to harm Villanelle) but Villanelle saves Eve instead, executing Aaron after the latter orders Villanelle to kill Eve. Raymond later arrives and attacks Villanelle, rendering her seemingly defenseless but Eve intervenes and kills Raymond. Villanelle and Eve escape to Hadrian's Villa (Teatro Marittimo, Tivoli, Lazio) and have an argument after Villanelle reveals that she wanted Eve to kill Raymond to see how it feels to kill. Eve rejects Villanelle's plan for them to run away together and walks away. Villanelle shoots Eve and leaves.

=== Series 3 (2020) ===
Killing Eve series 3 episodes
No. overall	No. in series	Title	Directed by	Written by	Original release date	U.S. viewers (millions)
17	1	"Slowly Slowly Catchy Monkey"	Terry McDonough	Suzanne Heathcote	12 April 2020	0.443
Six months after the events in Rome, Villanelle has settled down in Spain and is about to be married when former assassin Dasha appears. Dasha trained Villanelle and now asks her to return to working for the Twelve. Villanelle asks to be promoted to the role of "Keeper" in return, which would make her more powerful than both Dasha and Konstantin. To prove her loyalty, she is tasked with killing a local political agitator in Barcelona. At MI6 Paul has been appointed to 'oversee' Carolyn's Desk. Meanwhile, Eve survives the shooting, but has left MI6 and now works at a Korean restaurant in New Malden, alongside to selling her house whereas Niko is residing in a mental health facility, traumatized from his ordeal encounter with Villanelle. Kenny has also quit MI6 and now works as a journalist independently investigating the Twelve. Eve agrees to meet him for after-work drinks, but finds his office deserted. She discovers his dead body outside, having apparently been thrown from the roof by an unknown assailant.
18	2	"Management Sucks"	Terry McDonough	Anna Jordan	19 April 2020	0.342
Eve gets drunk at Kenny's funeral after learning his death was declared a suicide. She tries to access his phone but doesn't know the password. Kenny's boss Jamie offers to unlock it in exchange for her cooperation in investigating Kenny's death. Carolyn approaches Eve separately, frustrated that she cannot investigate Kenny's death after being put on bereavement leave. She believes that Villanelle is active again. Eve hesitates, but ends up agreeing to help Carolyn. The two are unaware that Konstantin is eavesdropping on them. Meanwhile, Villanelle is assigned to mentor Felix, a promising young assassin. They infiltrate a children's birthday party to kill their target, but Felix diverges from the plan so Villanelle kills him. She returns home to find Konstantin waiting for her, and he informs her that Eve is alive.
19	3	"Meetings Have Biscuits"	Miranda Bowen	Laura Neal	26 April 2020	0.334
Eve finds that Kenny had been looking into financial records and that a bank account in Geneva, used by the Chinese diplomat Villanelle killed in season 1, has suddenly become active again. Carolyn engineers a meeting with Henrik, a Swiss banker and her former flame, to find out who manages the account. The trail leads to Charles Kruger, a former Russian agent who disappeared at the end of the Cold War. Eve suspects that he is the Twelve's accountant. Villanelle tracks her down on a bus and the two briefly fight; Villanelle gains the upper hand, but Eve surprises her by kissing her before headbutting her. Eve realises that Villanelle might be in London to kill Carolyn. She tries to warn Carolyn as she visits Kruger, but she is too late. Disguised as a police officer, Villanelle kills Kruger. Eve returns to her apartment to find a stuffed toy reciting a recorded message from Villanelle.
20	4	"Still Got It"	Miranda Bowen	Elinor Cook	3 May 2020	0.380
Eve finds a connection between a murder committed by Villanelle and another death in 1974, and is disturbed by the delivery of a birthday cake sent by Villanelle. Konstantin tracks down Kruger's widow and convinces her to send him a file that Kruger had set aside as an insurance policy. He travels to Barcelona and gives Villanelle information on her family, promising her more if she kills Kruger's widow. Meanwhile, Niko leaves England for Poland to manage his PTSD. Eve repeatedly tries to get in contact with him, but receives no response. Dasha is approached by an agent of the Twelve who orders her to make sure Villanelle remains focused. She follows Niko to Poland and steals his phone, using it to lure Eve to his farmhouse. Dasha stabs Niko in front of Eve, but remains hidden from view. She leaves a message to make Eve think Villanelle is responsible as Villanelle arrives at her hometown in Russia.
21	5	"Are You from Pinner?"	Shannon Murphy	Suzanne Heathcote	10 May 2020	0.419
Villanelle's return to her family home in Russia is met with surprise and suspicion from her extended family. She bonds with her reclusive brother Pyotr and her Elton John-obsessed half-brother Bor'ka, and reunites with her mother Tatiana. She settles into family life and for a time enjoys herself. Things come to a head when the family visit the local Harvest Festival; Bor'ka enters a cooking competition, but does not win. He confides in Villanelle that Tatiana shamed him for embarrassing her afterwards. Villanelle confronts Tatiana over her abandoning Villanelle at an orphanage as a child. Tatiana demands she leave before claiming that Villanelle's father, whom she adored, was in fact afraid of her. Heartbroken, Villanelle kills Tatiana before blowing up the house, sparing only Bor'ka and Pyotr. Villanelle leaves money for Bor'ka to buy tickets to an Elton John show and escapes aboard a train, where she starts crying and dancing in her seat to the music on her headphones.
22	6	"End of Game"	Shannon Murphy	Krissie Ducker	17 May 2020	0.340
Villanelle is promoted to Keeper by Hélène, an agent of the Twelve, and ordered to kill a Romanian politician. Disappointed and frustrated that the work is no different, she approaches Konstantin and asks to join his plan to run away. Konstantin is reluctant because his daughter Irina hates her. Villanelle and Irina bond over their shared dislike of their mothers. Paul assigns Konstantin to investigate Kruger's wife's death and tells him that the person who arrange the hit is the one they have been looking for. Carolyn continues her investigation into Kenny's death and is shocked to learn that Kenny believed Konstantin was his father. Meanwhile, Niko survives his attack but rejects Eve. Eve deduces that Villanelle did not attack Niko. She visits Dasha in Barcelona, who taunts her; Eve is unfazed and tells her that she knows she attacked Niko. Dasha returns to her apartment and finds an injured Villanelle. Villanelle admits that she wants to escape the life of a killer for hire. Konstantin prepares to flee with Irina but is horrified when she runs over her stepfather with a car.
23	7	"Beautiful Monster"	Damon Thomas	Laura Neal	24 May 2020	0.357
Villanelle meets with Hélène over her commitment to the job. Villanelle asks for another assignment instead. She and Dasha travel to Aberdeen to kill an American businessman at a golf resort. After luring the American into the woods, Villanelle hits Dasha over the head with a golf club and leaves her for dead. Eve tracks Villanelle's credit card to Aberdeen and finds Dasha semi-conscious in the woods. Dasha admits to stabbing Niko and Eve is tempted to kill her by standing on her chest. Carolyn's aide, Mo, discovers something connecting Paul to the Twelve but he is killed by Rhian, an assassin for the Twelve. Meanwhile, Konstantin is frustrated by his inability to get Irina released from prison. He returns to England and is called by Villanelle to pick her up after she attacks Dasha. As they prepare to board a train, he begins having a heart attack. Villanelle promises to return for Konstantin, but abandons him instead, and he is found by Eve. As Villanelle's train leaves, she looks out the window to see Eve on the platform. She calls Eve. Konstantin wakes up in a hospital and finds Dasha in the bed next to him.
24	8	"Are You Leading or Am I?"	Damon Thomas	Suzanne Heathcote and Laura Neal	31 May 2020	0.393
Villanelle approaches Carolyn and offers to become an informant for MI6; Carolyn rejects her when she cannot provide any information. Villanelle then asks Eve to retrieve a package Konstantin had hidden to aid his escape. Their meeting is interrupted by Rhian, who summons Villanelle to meet Hélène. Villanelle kills Rhian. Konstantin checks himself out of hospital and argues with Dasha over their handling of Villanelle. The stress causes Dasha to die of a heart attack. Konstantin reaches Eve when Paul calls him and demands to see him. They arrive at Paul's house to find Carolyn holding him at gunpoint and Villanelle joins them. Having seen a video of Kenny and Konstantin on the day Kenny died, Carolyn demands an explanation from Konstantin. He claims he tried to recruit Kenny into the Twelve to save him, but Kenny got scared and fell to his death. Carolyn eventually spares him and kills Paul. She concludes that she will never be able to stop the Twelve. Eve and Villanelle leave together. They make a pact to walk away and never see each other again, but the two stop walking and look back at each other.

=== Series 4 (2022) ===
Killing Eve series 4 episodes
No. overall	No. in series	Title	Directed by	Written by	Original release date	U.S. viewers (millions)
25	1	"Just Dunk Me"	Stella Corradi	Laura Neal	27 February 2022	0.435
An unspecified amount of time after the end of the third series, Villanelle has turned to religion in an effort to redeem herself and is living in a church in England with vicar Phil and his daughter May. Eve, still going after the Twelve and now working in private security, tracks down Konstantin, who is now mayor of a Russian town, and obtains a lead on Hélène. Carolyn, having been demoted after killing Paul, also continues to hunt down the Twelve and finds out someone has been killing its members. Frustrated with her lack of official powers, she enlists the help of Eve and later defects to Russia in search of more information. Villanelle invites Eve to her baptism, but she does not attend. Villanelle makes a surprise visit to Eve, but Eve does not acknowledge her efforts to change. Frustrated, Villanelle returns to the church and attempts to kill May by drowning her in the baptismal font but manages to stop herself. Later that night, Villanelle has a vision of Jesus in the form of herself in drag.
26	2	"Don't Get Eaten"	Stella Corradi	Laura Neal	6 March 2022 (Note: This episode was released a week earlier on ABC iview in Australia and on Canal+ Séries in France.)	0.341
Guided by her vision of Jesus, Villanelle joins Phil, May and their congregation on a camping trip. Villanelle appears to make amends with May after the attempted drowning, and May confides in Villanelle that her father Phil is responsible for her mother's death by crashing their car while driving drunk. Villanelle reveals this to the rest of the congregation in an attempt to hold Phil accountable, but she is met with rejection. She later overhears Phil and May talking about her negatively, lashes out and kills them. She then leaves the campsite, abandoning her vision of Jesus. Meanwhile, Eve tracks Hélène to an apartment in Paris. She is aided by her colleague Yusuf, with whom she also has a casual sexual relationship. They travel to Paris, where Eve confronts Hélène in her apartment. Hélène reveals to Eve that she is responsible for the murders of the members of the Twelve that Carolyn uncovered. She is doing this to find the leader of the Twelve. Eve and Hélène agree to help each other.
27	3	"A Rainbow in Beige Boots"	Anu Menon	Kayleigh Llewellyn	13 March 2022	0.300
Villanelle returns to London and breaks into Eve's hotel room. Eve, having returned from Paris, finds her there and rejects her calls for help, but allows her to stay in the room. Eve leaves to track down Hélène's car to a parking garage where she runs into a disgruntled ex-girlfriend of Hélène. Eve invites her for drinks in an attempt to obtain information on Hélène's target and learns she was married in Cuba to a presumably German man named Lars, before her relationship with Hélène. Eve believes Lars could be Hélène's target. Hélène meets with Pam, an assassin-in-training who expresses a wish to start working to escape her abusive family. After hesitation, Hélène agrees and assigns Konstantin as her handler. Using Eve's tablet, Villanelle arranges a meeting with Eve's psychiatrist friend Martin and holds him hostage at his home, forcing him to give her therapy. Martin tells her that her psychopathic tendencies were learned, and can possibly be unlearned. Eve returns to her hotel room and finds out Villanelle went after Martin. She meets Villanelle at Martin's home, shortly followed by armed police requested by Eve, who arrest and imprison Villanelle.
28	4	"It's Agony and I'm Ravenous"	Anu Menon	Kayleigh Llewellyn	20 March 2022	0.337
Villanelle is released from prison with the help of Hélène, who tells her that it is impossible to leave the Twelve and gives her a new assignment in Cuba. In Havana, Cuba, Villanelle kidnaps Carolyn, who has traveled there to interrogate Rustem, a member of the Twelve who survived an assassination attempt ordered by Hélène. She assaults Carolyn but spares her life after Carolyn reveals to Villanelle that she has known her since she was a child in the orphanage. Carolyn encourages Villanelle to interrogate and torture Rustem, who gives up the name of a restaurant before being killed by Villanelle. Carolyn runs into Lars at the restaurant, who is surprised to see Carolyn and flees. She tells Villanelle that she was in a relationship with Lars and that he is likely headed for Berlin. Meanwhile, Eve meets Hélène who confirms that Lars is in fact her target, and challenges Eve to find him before she does. While following up on a lead in Paris, she is contacted by Hélène who invites Eve to her apartment and taunts her with the news that Villanelle is out of prison. In response, Eve kisses Hélène and leaves the apartment.
29	5	"Don't Get Attached"	Emily Atef	Laura Neal and Georgia Lester	27 March 2022	0.194
In 1979, Carolyn and Konstantin attend an anarchist meeting in Berlin, led by Lars. When Lars is gathering ideas for names for their group, Carolyn suggests they name themselves after the number of founding members—twelve. Carolyn and Konstantin flirt, and eventually spend the night together. She later discovers that her father, a British spy, has committed suicide after being blackmailed. After learning that Konstantin is Russian, she confronts him at a lake. Konstantin says he is a KGB spy and responsible for blackmailing her father. Lars finds the two arguing and a fight ensues during which he falls into the lake and disappears, presumed dead. In the present day, Villanelle murders the abusive husband of her Cuban hostess, then leaves Cuba to meet Konstantin in Margate in an attempt to locate Hélène. Eve acquires an old Super 8 film of Lars and his British girlfriend. Viewing the recording, she recognizes a young Carolyn. Eve abducts Hélène's daughter Chloe from Paris as a response to Hélène bailing Villanelle out of prison. Hélène retaliates by driving Eve out to Margate, where Eve is forced to watch Villanelle being struck by an arrow and falling unconscious. Eve runs to Villanelle and cradles her.
30	6	"Oh Goodie, I'm the Winner"	Emily Atef	Kayleigh Llewellyn	3 April 2022	0.273
Villanelle's injuries are treated by Eve, Konstantin and Pam. Gunn, a Twelve assassin from Scotland who was also trained by Konstantin, might be behind the attack. An unsuspecting Villanelle later meets Gunn, who slips her a note stating that she was ordered to kill Villanelle by Hélène but chose to spare her, and that Hélène is in a hotel in Berlin. Eve travels to Berlin after being told by Villanelle that Carolyn and Lars are there, but only finds Hélène and follows her to her hotel room. Villanelle, who was already hiding in that room, kills Hélène in front of Eve. Still upset with Eve for having her arrested, Villanelle abandons Eve. She leaves for Scotland to meet Gunn after being given her location by Konstantin. Eve tracks down Carolyn and confronts her outside Lars' cabin near Berlin. Carolyn says that she is not part of the Twelve and that she is only there to get information out of Lars. To Carolyn's disappointment, Eve enters the cabin and kills Lars. Carolyn searches Lars' body to find a notebook. Villanelle arrives at the remote Scottish island where Gunn lives. She meets Gunn and asks if she can stay with her.
31	7	"Making Dead Things Look Nice"	Stella Corradi	Sarah Simmonds	10 April 2022	0.354
Villanelle wakes up on Gunn's island and accompanies Gunn on a hunting trip. The two exchange stories and kiss. Gunn immediately becomes attached to Villanelle, but Villanelle rejects Gunn upon learning that she is still loyal to the Twelve, and attempts to leave the island. Gunn responds by chasing Villanelle with a machete. Meanwhile, Eve is invited to karaoke by Yusuf, where she experiences flashbacks of her former husband and MI5 colleagues. Yusuf permanently leaves Eve after she tells him she cannot move on from her past. Eve visits Martin for guidance, who advises her to connect with the people who truly understand her. Eve receives a cryptic message on Hélène's phone and visits Konstantin, who tells her it is an announcement for a Twelve meeting. He advises her to bring Villanelle along with her and gives her the location of Gunn's island. Pam visits Konstantin after Eve leaves, and kills Konstantin on Hélène's final orders. A dying Konstantin reveals Hélène's death to Pam and asks her to deliver a letter and love declaration to Carolyn. Eve travels to Gunn's island and is ambushed by Gunn while Villanelle, who has hidden in the bushes, watches from nearby.
32	8	"Hello, Losers"	Stella Corradi	Laura Neal	10 April 2022	0.354
Eve blinds Gunn during their struggle, and she and Villanelle escape the island. They spend a loving day and night together travelling through the Scottish countryside to reach the Twelve meeting in London, after Eve convinces Villanelle to help her. Meanwhile, Pam delivers Konstantin's letter to Carolyn. Pam is offered a job by Carolyn, but she refuses and walks away. Carolyn, having followed clues in Lars' notebook, arrives at the Twelve's proposed meeting place shortly followed by Eve and Villanelle. Hélène's phone receives a message indicating that the meeting place has changed to a boat on the River Thames where a wedding is also taking place. At night, Eve and Villanelle board the boat, where Villanelle slaughters the present Twelve members while Eve distracts the wedding guests. Right afterwards Villanelle is shot by an unseen sniper. Villanelle saves Eve by shielding her and taking the shot as the two jump in the Thames, where Villanelle sinks into the depths with Eve unable to reach her. Carolyn, watching from a distance, acknowledges the assassination on a walkie-talkie. Eve resurfaces in the middle of the river, screaming in anguish.

== Ratings ==
=== Series 1 ===
Viewership and ratings per episode of List of Killing Eve episodes
No.	Title	Air date	Rating (18–49)	Viewers (millions)	DVR viewers (millions)	Total viewers (millions)
1	"Nice Face"	8 April 2018	0.10	0.423	0.348	0.771
2	"I'll Deal With Him Later"	15 April 2018	0.07	0.371	0.397	0.769
3	"Don't I Know You?"	22 April 2018	0.08	0.388	—N/a	—N/a
4	"Sorry Baby"	29 April 2018	0.11	0.503	0.475	0.978
5	"I Have a Thing About Bathrooms"	6 May 2018	0.13	0.518	—N/a	—N/a
6	"Take Me to the Hole!"	13 May 2018	0.14	0.537	0.536	1.073
7	"I Don't Want to Be Free"	20 May 2018	0.11	0.485	—N/a	—N/a
8	"God, I'm Tired"	27 May 2018	0.13	0.701	0.633	1.335

=== Series 2 ===
Viewership and ratings per episode of List of Killing Eve episodes
No.	Title	Air date	Rating (18–49)	Viewers (millions)	DVR viewers (millions)	Total viewers (millions)
1	"Do You Know How to Dispose of a Body?"	7 April 2019	0.10	0.403	0.386	0.790
2	"Nice and Neat"	14 April 2019	0.07	0.321	0.445	0.766
3	"The Hungry Caterpillar"	21 April 2019	0.04	0.361	—N/a	—N/a
4	"Desperate Times"	28 April 2019	0.12	0.459	0.441	0.900
5	"Smell Ya Later"	5 May 2019	0.13	0.454	0.459	0.914
6	"I Hope You Like Missionary!"	12 May 2019	0.07	0.402	0.493	0.896
7	"Wide Awake"	19 May 2019	0.09	0.419	0.477	0.897
8	"You're Mine"	26 May 2019	0.08	0.367	0.413	0.780

=== Series 3 ===
Viewership and ratings per episode of List of Killing Eve episodes
No.	Title	Air date	Rating (18–49)	Viewers (millions)	DVR viewers (millions)	Total viewers (millions)
1	"Slowly Slowly Catchy Monkey"	12 April 2020	0.12	0.443	0.290	0.733
2	"Management Sucks"	19 April 2020	0.08	0.342	0.297	0.639
3	"Meetings Have Biscuits"	26 April 2020	0.10	0.334	0.399	0.733
4	"Still Got It"	3 May 2020	0.11	0.380	—N/a	—N/a
5	"Are You From Pinner"	10 May 2020	0.11	0.419	0.371	0.790
6	"End of Game"	17 May 2020	0.10	0.340	0.456	0.796
7	"Beautiful Monster"	24 May 2020	0.09	0.357	0.464	0.821
8	"Are You Leading or Am I?"	31 May 2020	0.11	0.393	0.346	0.739

=== Series 4 ===
Viewership and ratings per episode of List of Killing Eve episodes
No.	Title	Air date	Rating (18–49)	Viewers (millions)	DVR viewers (millions)	Total viewers (millions)
1	"Just Dunk Me"	27 February 2022	0.06	0.435	TBD	TBD
2	"Don't Get Eaten"	27 February 2022	0.05	0.341	TBD	TBD
3	"A Rainbow in Beige Boots"	6 March 2022	0.03	0.300	TBD	TBD
4	"It's Agony and I'm Ravenous"	13 March 2022	TBD	0.337	TBD	TBD
5	"Don't Get Attached"	27 March 2022	TBD	0.194	TBD	TBD
6	"Oh Goodie, I'm The Winner"	3 April 2022	0.02	0.273	TBD	TBD
7	"Making Dead Things Look Nice"	10 April 2022	0.04	TBD	TBD	TBD
8	"Hello, Losers"	10 April 2022	0.04	TBD	TBD	TBD
