= Don't I Know You? =

- Killing Eve episode
- Bill spots Villanelle in the Berlin night club
- Episode no.: Season 1 Episode 3
- Directed by: Jon East
- Written by: Vicky Jones
- Original air date: 22 April 2018
- Running time: 43 minutes

Guest appearances
- Simon Chin as Zhang Wu; Lobo Chan as Jin Yeong; Susie Trayling as Pamela; Anatole Taubman as Weber; Barbara Sotelsek as Hot Medica Receptionist; Topher Collins as Police Officer; Julian Michael Deuster as Man in Hot Medica Reception; Coline Atterbury as Berlin Shop Assistant

Episode chronology
| ← Previous "I'll Deal with Him Later" | Next → "Sorry Baby" |

"Don't I Know You?" is the third episode of the BBC America television show Killing Eve. It aired on 22 April 2018 in the United States and 29 September 2018 in the United Kingdom.

Villanelle (Jodie Comer) begins to further tease Eve Polastri (Sandra Oh) by using her name to commit a murder at a sex clinic, drawing her to the scene of the crime.

== Synopsis ==
As none of the nurses at the hospital match the suspect, Eve is asked to describe the woman she saw in the bathroom to a police sketch artist, which she does with vivid details, showing a close interest in Villanelle; the artist asks for more simple physical detail. Villanelle, again dressed as a nurse, arrives at a sex clinic in Berlin, telling the staff she is a temp called "Eve Polastri". She begins to 'treat' Zhang Wu (Simon Chin), a Chinese diplomat. It is Zhang's birthday so he requests "something special"—Villanelle clamps his scrotum past the point of Zhang calling his safeword before increasing the gas flow to his mask, killing him.

Eve shows signs of tension in her marriage, questioning Niko's (Owen McDonnell) choice of food and not sharing with him when he tries to start conversation. She then leaves to help Bill (David Haig); heading into work, the pair are met by Carolyn (Fiona Shaw), Elena (Kirby Howell-Baptiste), and Kenny (Sean Delaney), who inform them of the latest assassination, revealing that Villanelle knows about their task force. Eve decides to head to Berlin and asks Bill to join her, though Bill suggests taking Elena because of the younger agent's desire for fieldwork. Bill is the only member of the group who speaks German, so he agrees; Bill jokes that he'll die, but Eve assures him that Villanelle has likely fled the city.

Showing a much more obvious sexual desire, Villanelle playfully begins an intimate encounter with a Canadian tourist, Pamela (Susie Trayling), who has curly hair similar to Eve's, calling the tourist "Eve" and asking to be chased. In London, Eve, preparing to travel, is encouraged by Niko to add a luggage tag so she doesn't lose her suitcase. As soon as they arrive in Berlin, Eve and Bill visit the clinic with German agent Weber (Anatole Taubman), which Villanelle is staking out. It is revealed that Villanelle had replaced the gas with carbon monoxide to poison Zhang; however, another Chinese official, Jin Yeong (Lobo Chan) is concerned about the cause of death, so Eve must consult him to get the official autopsy report. She calls Kenny to locate Jin, asking Bill to watch her suitcase as she does—she returns to find it has been taken.

In a hotel room, Villanelle rummages through Eve's suitcase, putting on a zebra-print green scarf before Konstantin (Kim Bodnia) makes a surprise appearance—he is unhappy that she has stayed in the city after the assassination, especially with Eve around, which he is not aware that she also knows, but then suggests she can now trail Eve. Pamela, the tourist, returns, to Konstantin's dismay; as he leaves, Villanelle dresses her in Eve's clothes. Bill and Eve hunt down Jin. As Bill repeats his apologies for losing the suitcase, Eve only notes that Niko will be unhappy about the green scarf, though she personally doesn't like it. They confront Jin, who says that a revised cause of death says Zhang had a heart attack, but get no more information; Jin then says they can talk more over dinner, inviting only Eve. Eve goes shopping for a nice dress, per Jin's instructions, at the suggestion of going clubbing after dinner; Bill explores Berlin and bumps into Villanelle without recognising her. As Eve is shopping, Villanelle is dressed as a store attendant and surreptitiously suggests a matching belt for the dress she has picked out, smiling shyly behind a clothing rail when Eve approves.

At her hotel, Eve begins getting dressed and receives a video call from Niko, who is hosting a dinner party she had forgotten about and questions her dress, with Eve explaining her dinner situation, which Niko doesn't like. In her own hotel, Villanelle watches the video call remotely. Bill then enters, telling her she needs to shave her armpits and then offering other fashion advice, telling Eve to remove her bra because it shows at the sides and back of the dress, which wasn't designed to be worn with a bra. The two also exchange friendly rapport, discussing Bill's party years in Berlin and his bisexuality, before Bill asks Eve if she is attracted to women and to Villanelle. He then walks her to the train station and directs her, catching sight of Villanelle as he is leaving.

Bill recognises the green scarf on Villanelle and protects Eve by stepping in and asking about it so that the train leaves before she can chase Eve; Villanelle gives an innocent excuse and leaves the station, but Bill pursues her. Eve is busy at the dinner with Jin, who keeps pushing back on revealing any information, forcing Eve to remain and give niceties. While Bill chases Villanelle through Berlin, Villanelle becomes aware of him and begins to tease him. Eve struggles with keeping up the facade and gets Jin to outright tell her what happened; he reveals that the Chinese government is covering up Zhang's death but only because of the fetish association, not because they called the hit. He also says he is unable to keep investigating why Zhang was killed, but asks Eve to continue it. Bill calls Eve, explaining that he is tailing someone in Cassiopeia, asking for her help and to call Weber for him. Villanelle escapes Bill by cutting into an upmarket night club; Bill tries to follow but is sent to the back of the line by the bouncer. Jin continues to give Eve information as she ignores her phone, telling her that Zhang had uncovered a Chinese mole shortly before his assassination, suggesting there may be a connection; Eve takes the hint and then opens a gift Jin gave her when she arrived, revealing a memory drive. She checks her phone when Bill leaves another voicemail, leaving dinner to help him.

Bill and Eve get into the night club at about the same time, Bill slightly outpacing her as they search the dancefloor and spotting Villanelle first. As he fights through dancers to reach her, she turns around and smiles at him as though she has known his location the entire time, moving across the dancefloor to get to him. He tries to run away but is trapped between dancers. Villanelle stabs him repeatedly in the chest to the music, looking deeply into his eyes, with Eve watching on from across the dancefloor. Villanelle leaves as Eve tries to cross the dancefloor to Bill, who sags to the floor as he bleeds out.

== Production ==
=== Filming ===
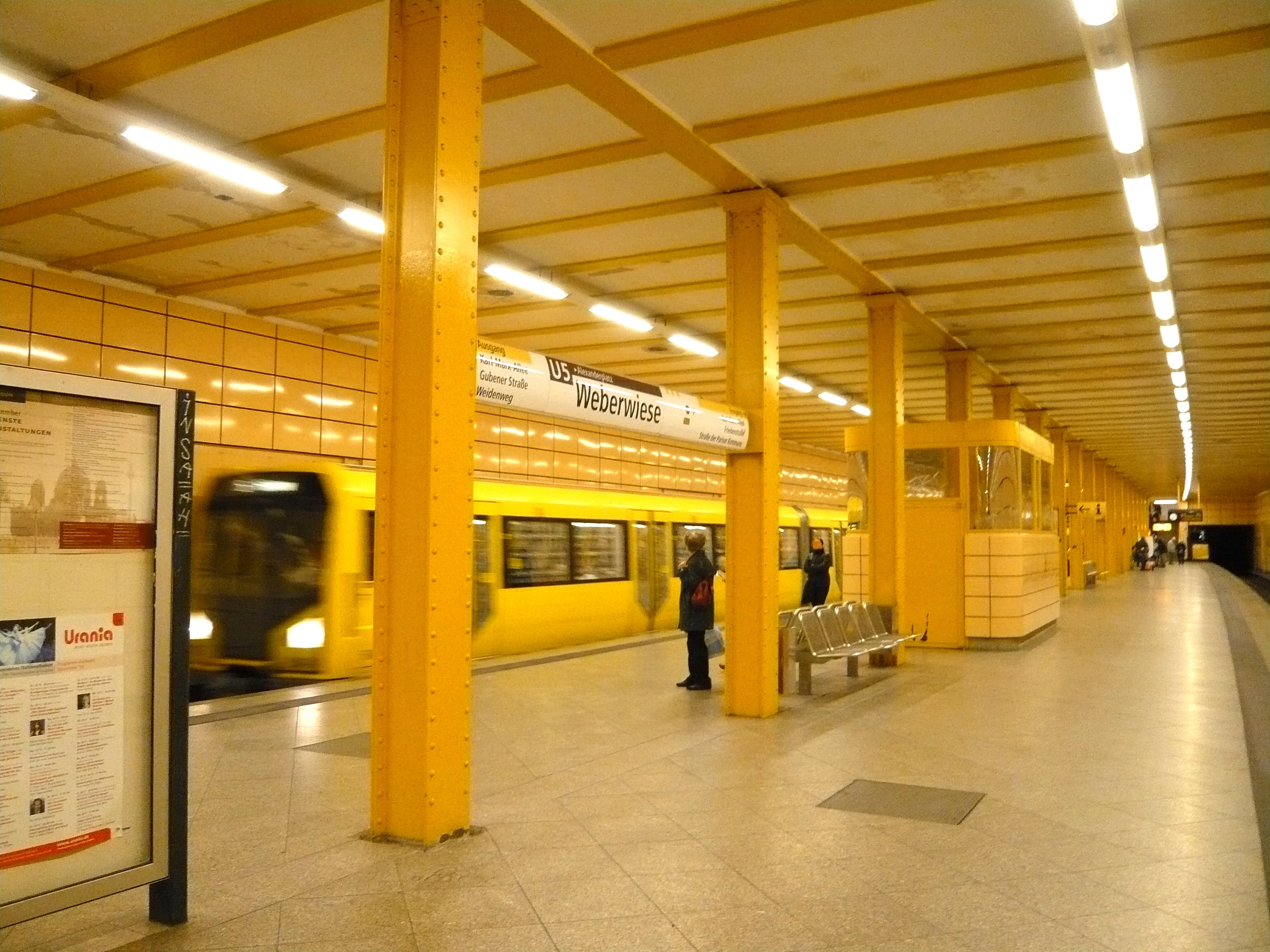
The yellow Weberwiese underground station

Some scenes were filmed in Berlin, including Bill and Villanelle's encounter at the train station. The exterior was recorded at Friedrichstraße station, where it is set, whilst the interior used is that of the Weberwiese U-Bahn. Condé Nast Traveler says that the "canary yellow U-Bahn trains and the complimentary [sic] yellow-tiled [platform]" of the station serve as "the perfect monochromatic backdrop" for the scene.

The nightclub scene, however, was filmed in the UK at Fabric, a London venue famous for its bass transformers underneath the dancefloor that vibrate with the music. Director Jon East has explained that to achieve a shot of Villanelle turning to make eye contact with Bill across the dance floor, specific choreography was developed and slow-motion had to be used.

=== Dries van Noten suit ===
Jodie Comer as Villanelle wearing the Dries van Noten suit

The "power suit" that Villanelle wears in this episode has been described as "iconic". It is a brocade suit that was designed by Dries Van Noten and became Comer's favorite outfit; the actress was planning to take it home but felt it was too much like her character. The fitted suit at first appears to have a pattern of red hearts, but at closer inspection this is revealed to be interlocking red and blue geometric shapes; the pattern is one thing it has been described as "memorable" for.

Costume designer Phoebe de Gaye said that for the scene she wanted Villanelle to have "a kind of mannish look", opting for a suit that was very different from the "Uniqlo mixed up with charity shops" suits that Eve wears in that "it's got shape" and is "low at the front", so it looks "sexy" rather than business practical. She also discusses how the bright colors of the suit worked well both under the pink and purple strobing lights of the nightclub and the bright lights of the Berlin U-Bahn, and how the metallic sheen made it "gleam[...] in a slightly sinister way" in the external night shots. IndieWire notes that the suit both matches Villanelle's job, in that it is comfortable, but is also attention-grabbing, showing "just how cocky she is about not getting caught despite standing out".

== Reception ==
Critics have noted the use of the "Bury your gays" stereotype in the episode; Andrea Merodeadora of Medium comments on how quickly Bill is murdered—explaining that "Not ten minutes after we learn that [he] isn't straight, Villanelle murders him"—and on its extreme violence, especially compared to Villanelle's typically elegant kills, as she uses "over a dozen swift, deep stabs to the chest". Though the review in general praises the representation of LGBT+ characters in the series, it does note that neither Luke Jennings nor Phoebe Waller-Bridge (though they did not write this episode) publicly identify as LGBT, suggesting that they "[are not] at all aware of just how often gay people are killed off in TV and how harmful this is". Hanh Nguyen of IndieWire also comments on how "brutal" the murder is in contrast to the "outrageous" previous ones that it is "a massive departure from", and how it comes after "the usual storytelling tropes hinting at a colorful past". Kayti Burt of Den of Geek and Lisa Weidenfeld of The A.V. Club both thought the death was poorly executed, but appreciated how it contributed to the growing co-dependency of Eve and Villanelle; Burt described Bill's death as "sloppily handled" and "contrived", with Weidenfeld saying that it "doesn’t quite hold water".

Reviews praise the representation of LGBT+ characters in the episode, mentioning the nonchalant way Bill, an older man, discusses his fluid sexuality; how Eve and the show openly acknowledge the erotic description she gives of Villanelle without being concerned of its implications; and the easy excitement of a female tourist's unexpected sexual encounter with Villanelle. (Note: Explored in the Merodeadora Medium article, the Nguyen IndieWire article, and a Vox article by Caroline Framke.)

On Rotten Tomatoes the episode has a 100% rating from 5 reviews.
