= Sorry Baby (Killing Eve) =

- Killing Eve episode
- Eve Polastri and Elena at Bill's funeral
- Episode no.: Season 1 Episode 4
- Directed by: Jon East
- Written by: George Kay
- Original air date: 29 April 2018
- Running time: 43 minutes

Guest appearances
- Haruka Kuroda as Keiko Pargrave; Edward Akrout as Diego; Olivia Ross as Nadia; Jan Carey as Veronica Hill

Episode chronology
← Previous "Don't I Know You?"	Next → "I Have a Thing About Bathrooms"

"Sorry Baby" is the fourth episode of the BBC America television show Killing Eve. It aired on 29 April 2018 in the United States and 6 October 2018 in the United Kingdom.

Villanelle (Jodie Comer) is made to work with other people to take someone out, while Eve Polastri (Sandra Oh) has her eyes on the same target.

== Synopsis ==
Bill's funeral is held in the UK. As Frank (Darren Boyd) delivers the eulogy, Eve is overwhelmed by emotions and walks out. Elena (Kirby Howell-Baptiste) asks Eve for her next step, and Eve replies "I want to kill her [Villanelle]. With my bare hands."

Villanelle throws a lavish birthday party for Konstantin (Kim Bodnia) in her apartment. Konstantin admonishes her for her unsanctioned killing of Bill, and as punishment she will have to work with others for her next job. She subtly warns Konstantin that she is aware of his daughter. Villanelle travels to England and meets her fellow assassins, Diego (Edward Akrout) and Nadia (Olivia Ross). Villanelle and Nadia scuffle, but Diego breaks up the fight. Nadia, who is in a relationship with Diego, tells Villanelle that their target is a member of the British intelligence services.

Niko (Owen McDonnell) implores Eve to pull out of the investigation after Bill's death. He also informs Eve that her suitcase appeared on their doorstep. She opens the suitcase to find it full of expensive designer clothing, along with a bottle of perfume called "La Villanelle" and a card with the message "Sorry Baby". Kenny's (Sean Delaney) analysis of the documents supplied by Jin (Lobo Chan) reveals a financial connection to a prep school. Eve consults with Carolyn (Fiona Shaw), revealing the mole as Frank. Kenny tracks Frank to a house in a village in Buckinghamshire, and Eve and Elena drive there to observe him.

Villanelle, Diego, and Nadia are notified that their target is Frank, and arrive at the village in a minivan. Villanelle and Nadia pose as colleagues of Frank to gain access to the house, but are held up at his house by an accomplice. Frank flees in a vehicle, and the assassins give chase. Frank's van is slower than the assassins', and he had to stop when he reached a farm. Eve calls Frank, and he tells her that he is being targeted. The assassins riddle Frank's stationary vehicle with bullets, but Frank had already climbed out and hid in nearby bushes on the advice of Eve. Villanelle provokes Diego into drawing his weapon on her, prompting Nadia to yell out Villanelle's real name, Oksana, and revealing that the two were in a relationship. Nadia convinces Diego that she will shoot Villanelle, then turns her gun on him instead. Villanelle pledges to prove herself to Nadia after previously betraying her, but only as a lure to get Nadia to the back of the minivan, running her over with it twice.

Eve talks Frank into making a run to her and Elena's car. Frank runs across a field, with Villanelle in pursuit on foot. Frank manages to scramble up a hill and climb into the car just as Villanelle appears. She locks eyes with Eve, raises a pistol, and fires.

== Production ==
=== La Villanelle perfume ===
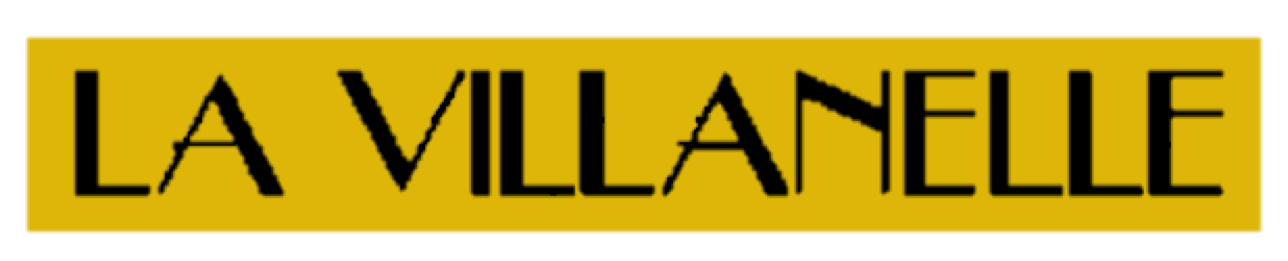
The words on the perfume bottle

At the start of the episode, Villanelle has returned Eve's stolen suitcase but packed it with luxurious fashion, including a bottle of perfume called "La Villanelle". Critics point to the "great deal of thought" and "care" that has gone into the selection, showing "intimacy" on Villanelle's part. It is also an act that reveals her name to Eve, a "perfume clue", with Eve knowing to literally chase the scent. In the episode, the perfume box is also where the note reading "Sorry Baby x" is tucked in, with one critic asking if it is "an apology or a taunt" and exploring Villanelle's psyche and intentions towards Eve; another outright calls it "a sexy way to taunt her".

In the Codename Villanelle book, hearing the dark backstory of the perfume is how Villanelle chooses her name. Before the episode aired, another critic had written that Villanelle's name was (to the average viewer) "off-putting" because it is "a bad pun on 'villainess'" and "a name for a Bond girl", and that it was only clever if you had read the books where it is explained that the character was "inspired toward the nom de guerre [...] by the label on a decadent perfume".

An unrelated perfume of the same name had been released in March 2018 by Belgian parfumier Kamila Aubre; Aubre said that she "noticed some unusual statistics on her website" after the episode's release but had assumed the increase in purchases would be because of a "beauty blogger" mentioning the product, having not heard of the show.

== Reception ==
Inkoo Kang of Vulture criticized the storytelling in the episode, noting that at halfway through the season it was not showing "the tightest mystery ever written", instead relying on "female prickliness, especially in professional settings" to create drama. Comparatively, Kayti Burt of Den of Geek noted how the use of "as tight a period of time as possible" was done well to "intensify the urgency of the drama", saying that the episode "is the best this good show has ever been" because of how the timing allowed "just enough" opportunity to consider Villanelle's actions but still move the plot along in "intriguing" ways. Lisa Weidenfeld of The A.V. Club comments on how "the whole plotline serves as an important reminder of the way Killing Eve toys with how you feel about Villanelle", and notes that it is "the first episode where we really see Eve and Villanelle going head to head", as they are both hunting down Frank.

Kang also says that this episode "made [her] realize that [she] just [doesn't] care about Eve's unhappy marriage" because of how it gives no backstory to explain Eve's coldness towards Niko; Burt celebrates the characterization of Eve only allowing Elena to comfort her because of their shared understanding, and the inverted marriage dynamics revealing sexist narratives and presenting the "complicated mundanity of relationship imbalances". Whilst Kang criticizes the specific line "We all know you care about me, but sometimes I think it's all you have", saying Eve "is [being] a jerk for the sake of it", IndieWire's Hanh Nguyen calls it a "heartbreaking" encapsulation of the complex relationship and "inevitable breakdown of the Polastris' marriage".

Both Burt and Nguyen discuss the shot of Eve's face during the funeral scene, with Burt saying that the camera staying "glued to her pained face for much longer than we are used to" traps the viewer in Eve's guilt-laden mind. Nguyen says that the "simplest approach" allows Eve "to just be" and is "especially effective when she must deal with grief", which she claims Sandra Oh makes "riveting".

On the supporting characters, Weidenfeld says that "Nadia and Diego basically serve the purpose of proving how much better at [being an assassin] Villanelle is". Nguyen says that "[Phoebe] Waller-Bridge's keen understanding of humor in any situation" means that Diego was "memorable for the brief time viewers got to know him".

Burt examines the approach to relationships Villanelle takes in this episode. Villanelle gives gifts to both Eve and Konstantin which also serve to threaten them, and nonchalantly kills ex-girlfriend Nadia; Burt suggests that Villanelle can't kill someone "until she tricks them into believing her performance of affection", which Nadia does. She also calls it "great" how the show "does diverse sexual orientation so casually".

As an American, Weidenfeld questions if the Received Pronunciation accent Villanelle adopts during the episode is Jodie Comer's real accent, with Burt (also American) believing that it is and saying this was "both bizarre and fun to hear". Comer, a native of Liverpool, actually has a Scouse accent in real life. (Note: As seen in interviews, including the one Weidenfeld links when debating if it is different. Compare within interviews like on the BAFTAs 2017 red carpet, in which the interviewers still have regional accents but speak closer to RP than Comer's accent.) Weidenfeld, however, does assert that even she knows "fanny is slang for vagina".

On Rotten Tomatoes the episode has a 100% rating from 6 reviews.
