= I Have a Thing About Bathrooms =

- Killing Eve episode
- Villanelle confronts Eve with a knife to her chest, but does not harm her
- Episode no.: Season 1 Episode 5
- Directed by: Jon East
- Written by: Phoebe Waller-Bridge
- Original air date: 6 May 2018
- Running time: 43 minutes

Guest appearances
- Ken Nwosu as Max Sanford; Billy Matthews as Dominik Wolanski

Episode chronology
← Previous "Sorry Baby"	Next → "Take Me to the Hole!"

"I Have a Thing About Bathrooms" is the fifth episode of the BBC America television show Killing Eve. It aired on 6 May 2018 in the United States and 13 October 2018 in the United Kingdom.

Still on the hunt for Frank Haleton (Darren Boyd), Villanelle (Jodie Comer) confronts Eve Polastri (Sandra Oh) at her house. Eve has taken info from Frank, and Villanelle learns Nadia (Olivia Ross) is still alive.

The episode was Sandra Oh's pick to support her nomination for Outstanding Lead Actress in a Drama Series at the 70th Primetime Emmy Awards.

== Synopsis ==
With Frank and Elena (Kirby Howell-Baptiste) in the car, Eve begins to drive away, while Villanelle gives chase and shoots after them. Eve suddenly stops and gets out of the car to talk to Villanelle, ignoring protests from Frank and Elena. Eve and a stunned Villanelle stare at each other wordlessly. Villanelle toys with Eve by faking shooting herself, then fires a warning shot to the ground near Eve's feet, and disappears into the nearby woods.

While stopping at a diner, Eve and Elena question Frank about the assassins. Frank remembers one of the women is called Oksana, which Eve relays to Kenny (Sean Delaney). Kenny informs her the results of the tests on the suitcase, which revealed copious amounts of Villanelle's DNA. Eve and Elena take Frank to a safe house, where Carolyn (Fiona Shaw) is waiting. Elena goes home, and Carolyn and Eve question Frank. Frank reveals he was approached by a group called "The Twelve", who offered to pay for his dying wife's medical treatments in exchange for information, including Eve's investigation. He also says Villanelle's kills follow a pattern, with the aim of destabilising and sowing chaos in the world. Eve asks Kenny to look into The Twelve. Carolyn tells Eve the police found only Diego's body at the scene.

Eve returns to the office and joins Kenny in searching through records of people named Oksana. She identifies Villanelle as Oksana Astankova, who was incarcerated in a Russian prison for killing a man and cutting off his penis. The records also show she supposedly died in prison four years ago.

Eve arrives at her home with the suitcase. She puts on a dress from the suitcase and applies the perfume. She goes to the kitchen to read through the file on Villanelle. She hears a sound and goes to investigate, finding nothing. She turns around to see Villanelle in the house. Eve runs upstairs and locks herself in the bathroom. Villanelle kicks down the door and overpowers her by shoving her into a bathtub and turning on the tap, explaining she just wants to have dinner with her.

Eve warms up some leftover shepherd's pie for Villanelle, and Villanelle helps Eve to change out of the wet dress. While Villanelle eats, Eve asks why she broke into her house. Villanelle begins to sob, saying she is being controlled and she needs help, which Eve doesn't buy. Eve tells Villanelle she is aware of her past, her intelligence, and her psychopathy, and asks her about The Twelve. Villanelle replies that if Eve goes high enough, she'll probably find they both work for the same people. Eve asks her for her reasons for killing Bill; she replies that Bill was slowing Eve down. Eve picks up a knife but Villanelle disarms her and pins her to the fridge with the knife pointed at her throat. At the same time, Niko (Owen McDonnell) and Dom (Billy Matthews) arrive outside. Villanelle takes Eve's phone and dress and leaves through the front door as an unsuspecting Niko and Dom come in.

Eve goes to Carolyn's house, where she discovers that Kenny is Carolyn's son. Eve explains to Carolyn that Villanelle broke into her house and stole her phone, which contained the address to the safe house. Eve and Carolyn go to the safe house with an armed response team, only to find Villanelle had ambushed the security detail and killed Frank, then dressed him in the dress and cut off his penis.

Back at her apartment in Paris, Villanelle tells her version of the events to Konstantin (Kim Bodnia). She tells Konstantin Diego ran over Nadia, so she shot Diego. Konstantin tells her Nadia is still alive and in a prison in Russia, and suggests she pay her a visit before she can talk. Villanelle asks if Konstantin is one of The Twelve, but quickly deduces he is not.

== Production ==
Comer's first audition involved her and Oh, already cast, acting the kitchen scene in this episode, to ensure there was enough chemistry between the characters who have little interaction for the first few episodes. Of this moment, Oh said that "Jodie [Comer] flew from England to LA, we laid it down, and immediately, I felt like we could both feel, 'Oh, this is my dance partner.'"

== Reception ==
Inkoo Kang of Vulture writes that the creation of Frank is a successful depiction of a misogynist with sympathetic troubles but who still has committed unforgivable atrocities, comparing him to character "Hot Misogynist" in series 2 of Waller-Bridge's Fleabag; Kang also suggests that his motivations may be a satirisation of a British political anti-NHS group, but that she doesn't know enough of British politics to understand this.

Hanh Nguyen for IndieWire wrote that the episode is "built on" the two main face-to-face interactions between the main characters, who have not knowingly met the other before, which hold much significance: at the start of the episode when Eve steps out of her car to talk to an armed and angry Villanelle, who responds negatively and takes control of the situation, and at Eve's house where she now has more trepidation, though Villanelle instigated this meeting. Nguyen writes that both, with other moments in the episode, subvert expectations. Steve Charnock, for Dead Good, compares the kitchen meeting to the diner scene in Michael Mann's Heat, saying that it is "arguably the most tense, heart-stopping and thrilling five minutes of the series to date".

Den of Geek's Kayti Burt suggests that Eve wearing the clothes sent by Villanelle when the latter intrudes in her house shows how Eve is completely out of control in this moment, but that the moment of inquisition allows Eve enough insight into Villanelle that she can confront her during their impromptu dinner. Nguyen instead suggested that even at the dinner, confronted with her enigma, Eve "can't quite capture who Villanelle is as a person", which is what gives the scene its impact.

Burt identifies moments of stereotypical female roles that are twisted in the episode. After commenting on the use of the kitchen scene to pace the episode and draw on realism, say that it is a good example of "including notes of mundane absurdity during objectively terrifying moments", she suggests that being a "thoroughly domestic scene", where the characters "eat shepherd's pie heated up in the microwave" has made Eve apologise for not expecting Villanelle, showing that "how she's been socialized to behave as a woman bubbles up" in the location, taking precedence over spy training and survival instincts. She also notes that Carolyn uses maternal comfort to get the truth from Frank where interrogation did not work, and revealing her to be the caring mother of Kenny, though she normally shows no sign of having maternal instincts. Lisa Weidenfeld of The A.V. Club equally notes that though Carolyn's unexpected mothering position is feminine, it "subverts the notion that a female spy in that moment in a far more traditional story would be using her feminine wiles on a man", with the show routinely breaking down the idea that women should use sex appeal.

Weidenfeld does criticise the choice to have Eve be obsessed with Villanelle's background rather than her present, saying that "there isn't a satisfactory explanation for what she does, and I don't need to know that she went through some hideous thing as a kid to understand her", and noting that the audience may not be interested in finding out her "mystery trauma".
