= Sorry, Baby =

Sorry, Baby may refer to:

- Sorry Baby, a 1999 Chinese film
- Sorry, Baby (2025 film), an American film
- "Sorry Baby" (Killing Eve), a 2018 television episode
