= Haruka Kuroda =

Japanese actress

- 黒田 はるか
- Education: Guildford School of Acting
- Occupations: Actress; presenter
- Years active: 2000–present
- Partner: JC Connington
- Children: 1

Haruka Kuroda (黒田 はるか, Kuroda Haruka) is a Japanese actress and presenter. She provided the voice of Noodle from Damon Albarn and Jamie Hewlett's alternative rock virtual band Gorillaz from 2000 to 2017.

She performed on all the Phase One tour dates as Noodle: She performed Noodle's speaking voice at all tour dates as well as Noodle's backing vocals, she was also playing the second guitar. (It is a popular misconception that Miho Hatori performed on the Gorillaz tour.) She is also the speaking voice of Noodle in Gorillaz' promotional interview CD, 'The Apex Tapes', as well as all live radio interviews and 'G-Bites' short films from Phase 1.

She has also sung with JC Connington's rock group JUNKSTAR on the track Going Nowhere as well as featuring in various BBC productions. (Jonny Vegas's Ideal series 1-6 Jonathan Creek, Hiroshima & Brain-Jitsu). Her film credit includes Foster, Swinging with the Finkels, I Like London In the Rain & One Minute Past Midnight which won the short film of the year in 2005 at Chicago Film Festival.

Haruka had a constant role in kids' gaming show PXG in 2005, where she hosts alongside Kentaro Suyama as the voice of 'Game Girl'.

She works extensively as a voice-over artist like in the GameCube's 2005 Battalion Wars as the Solar Empire empress.

== Training ==
Haruka moved to England in 1992 and trained at the Guildford School of Acting, graduating in 2000. She is also a master of the martial art Sanjuro, teaching regularly in London.

== Filmography ==
=== Films ===
Year	Films	Role	Note
2002	The Incredibly Strange People Show	Slithis Girl #1	Video
2006	Gorillaz: Phase Two - Slowboat to Hades	Noodle (voice)	Video
2011	Swinging with the Finkels	Japanese Woman	
2011	Foster	Translator	
2011	Random 11	Yuri Miyamoto	
2024	Sonic the Hedgehog 3	Bartender	Unconfirmed

=== Television ===
Year	TV Series	Role	Note
2003	Jonathan Creek	Presenter	
2003	Grass	Japanese Tourist	
2002-2004	The Bill	Nurse	
2005	Broken News	Kyoko Ogura	World Money Today
2005	Hiroshima: BBC History of World War II	Akiko Takakura	TV movie documentary
2009	Things Talk	TV Remote	voice (TV movie)
2005–2011	Ideal	Yasuko	
2013	Hebburn	Midwife	
2013–2019	Officially Amazing	Co-host	With Ben Shires and Al Jackson
2016	Spot Bots	Whoops or Daisy	
2018	Killing Eve	Keiko Pargrave	Episode: "Sorry Baby"
2022	Killing Eve	Keiko Pargrave	Episode: "Making Dead Things Look Nice"

=== Video games ===
Year	Game	Role	Note
2005	Battalion Wars	Empress Lei-qo	voice
2006	Genji: Days of the Blade	Minazuru / Mystic / Kuyo (Orochi (Female))	voice
2006	Hot Shots Tennis	Chika	English version, voice
2009	Mini Ninjas	Hiro	voice
2010	Just Cause 2	Jade Tan	voice
2011	Total War: Shogun 2		voice
2012	Total War: Shogun 2: Fall of the Samurai		voice
2015	Elite: Dangerous	Imperial station voice	voice
2020	Hotshot Racing	Keiko	voice
2022	Warhammer 40,000: Darktide	The Judge	voice
2024	Wuthering Waves	Balanophora	voice

=== Short films ===
Year	Short Film	Role
2004	One Minute Past Midnight	Girl
2010	Buon Giorno Sayonara	Kumiko
