= Vicky Jones =

English director, playwright and screenwriter (born 1978)

- Born: 1978 (age 47–48); Sheffield, South Yorkshire, England
- Education: University of Birmingham
- Occupations: Theatre director, playwright and screenwriter

Vicky Jones (born 1978) is an English actress, stage director, playwright and screenwriter, who is the co-artistic director of DryWrite Theatre Company, along with her frequent collaborator Phoebe Waller-Bridge.

== Early life ==
Jones was born in Sheffield, South Yorkshire, England. She attended the University of Birmingham, studying international politics.

== Career ==
While working as a director on theatre productions, Jones met and became friends with Phoebe Waller-Bridge. The two founded and became co-artistic directors of DryWrite Theatre Company. In 2013, Jones directed Waller-Bridge's stage production Fleabag, which premiered at the Edinburgh Festival Fringe. Fleabag was later adapted as a television series for the BBC and Amazon Prime Video. Jones wrote the episode "Don't I Know You?" for Killing Eve in 2018.

Jones wrote the series Run for HBO in 2020 starring Merritt Weaver and Domhnall Gleeson.
