= PXG =

- Genre: Entertainment
- Created by: Prism Entertainment
- Presented by: Kentaro Suyama
- Country of origin: United Kingdom

Production
- Producer: Andrew Forgham

Original release
- Network: Jetix
- Release: February 2005 – March 2008

PXG is a television show created by Prism Entertainment for Jetix in the United Kingdom which covered "the latest in gaming reviews, hints, tips and cheats". It was presented by, directed by and starred Kentaro Suyama. The show began airing on the 12 February 2005.

== Programming ==
The name "PXG" was an acronym derived from the 3 main home console video games in stores at the time i.e. PlayStation 2, Xbox and GameCube. Each episode featured Kentaro and his CGI animated assistant "Game Girl" (voiced by Haruka Kuroda) reviewing various games and accessories.

== Original series (2005–06) ==
The original schedule was as follows:

Monday: Big in Japan: This segment discussed the latest popular games and systems in Japan, for example the launch of the Nintendo DS or the PlayStation Portable.

Tuesday: Mobile Madness: This segment focused on handhelds and their associated games. The first half discussed accessories and game rating previews while the second contained reviews.

Wednesday: Konsole Kids: This segment focused on consoles and their associated games. The first half was a Gameshow held within a caravan where gamers presented their replays of games they had played and their performance would be rated. If Kentaro enjoyed the replay then the gamer would win a supposed holiday on a tropical island and if not, then they would be subjected to a penalty involving flatulence.

Thursday: Easy PC: The first half of this segment consisted of a review of a PC game, while the second half consisted of several mini-reviews of games available online for free.

Friday: All the previous five-minute shows from the past 4 days were combined into one single show lasting half an hour. Also included was a final segment "Top of the Chops", a section in which five popular games were reviewed and answers of the questions given throughout the week were revealed. In addition to this there were also, video game related jokes and sneak previews of upcoming games at the time such as Zelda: Twilight Princess. Occasionally, the segment also featured videos of people dressing up as their favorite game characters.

== Second series (2007–08) ==
In 2007, the show was renewed for a second series albeit with some changes to the show's format.

Monday became Konsole Kids, Wednesday became Big in Japan, Thursday became Top of the Chops and Friday became Easy PC. "Top of the Chops" was significantly different, now only featuring one game in the section. Also "Game-Girl" was entirely absent during this season.

The second edition was deliberately designed to feature more user generated content. Director of Jetix UK Dominic Gardiner claimed that changes were made to "give kids a greater sense of ownership of the show."

== Development ==
To promote the series Jetix UK commissioned and launched an online game based on the show PXG: Amoeba Attack.
