= Brain-Jitsu =

- Starring: Simon Greenall; Haruka Kuroda
- Country of origin: United Kingdom
- Original language: English
- No. of series: 1
- No. of episodes: 25

Original release
- Network: CBBC
- Release: 25 February – 28 March 2008

Brain-Jitsu was a CBBC show which tests contestants (called brainees) to complete a set of challenges using different parts of their brains. After each challenge, one brainee is eliminated whilst the rest gain a higher level brain belt. The show was led and commentated by the Sensei, whilst the Shihan organises and watches over the tasks. All 25 episodes were broadcast from 25 February 2008 to 28 March 2008.

Between each level, contestants get the chance to prepare themselves for the challenge ahead in The Room of Mental Nourishment. They are given a challenge to train the part of the brain needed for the next level. The brainees are given the choice whether to participate or not, but any extra training they do prepares them for the task ahead. The loser of each level is interviewed in a Walk of Eternal Regret. Sometimes a segment called Brainy, Not So Brainy is shown between some levels.

== Levels and belts ==
At the start of the show, all eight brainees begin with a white belt. At the start of each following level, the brainees who are yet to be eliminated are given a higher level brain belt (worn around their forehead).

- Level 1 – Yellow Belt – This level uses the occipital lobes of the Brain. The task here is always Enter the Dojo.
- Level 2 – Orange Belt – This level uses the frontal lobes; requiring the brainees to do something they would normally do without thinking differently.
- Level 3 – Green Belt – This level requires the brainees to get into teams of two, each of the pair using a different half of their brain.
- Level 4 – Blue Belt – This level uses the amygdala as brainees are challenged to overcome fear.
- Level 5 – Red Belt – This level exercises the thinking part of the brain, the cerebrum, and the doing part, the Cerebellum.
- Level 6 – Brown Belt – This level requires the brainees to use their occipital lobes, temporal lobes and cerebellum.
- Level 7 – Black Belt – The two remaining contestants push a ball across a table using their focus. The force with which the ball is pushed is measured by the average amount of brain waves used during the challenge.

== Transmissions ==
Series	Start date	End date	Episodes
1	25 February 2008	28 March 2008	25

== Cancellation ==
On 28 March 2008, CBBC had announced that it would not recommission for a 2nd series.
