= Single-Handed (TV series) =

- RTÉ's promotional logo for Single-Handed 3: The Drowning Man (with Owen McDonnell as Sergeant Jack Driscoll)
- Genre: Drama
- Written by: Barry Simner
- Directed by: Colm McCarthy (series 1); Antony Byrne (series 2–3)
- Starring: Owen McDonnell Ian McElhinney; Steve Blount; Liam Carney; Pádraic Delaney; Bríain Gleeson; David Herlihy; Ann Marie Horan; Nick Lee; Ruth McCabe; Michael McElhatton; Charlene McKenna; Laura Murphy; Marcella Plunkett; Gavin O'Connor Owen Roe
- Country of origin: Ireland
- Original language: English
- No. of series: 4
- No. of episodes: 12

Production
- Producer: Element Pictures/Touchpaper Television Productions
- Running time: 47 min

Original release
- Network: RTÉ One
- Release: 18 March 2007 – 12 December 2010

Single-Handed is an Irish television drama series, first broadcast on RTÉ Television in 2007. Set and filmed in the west of Ireland, it focuses on the life of a member of the Garda Síochána (police), Sergeant Jack Driscoll (played by Owen McDonnell). Three two-episode, single-story series aired one each on consecutive nights in 2007, 2008 and 2009. Series Four, consisting of three stories told over six episodes, began in RTÉ One November 2010.

The series is partially inspired by garda corruption in County Donegal.

== Production ==
The first series was shot in October 2006. It was directed by Colm McCarthy; the second and third by Antony Byrne. Barry Simner wrote the screenplay. It was co-produced by Touchpaper Television Productions and Element Pictures. Clare Alan also produced the third series.

In 2009, all three series were broadcast in the United Kingdom on ITV, as double-length, two-hour episodes on three consecutive Sundays, from 2–16 August.

Series 4 began broadcasting on RTÉ One on Sunday, 7 November 2010. It was shown in the UK on ITV from Thursday, 14 July 2011.

== Casting ==
Owen McDonnell was given the lead role of Garda Sergeant Jack Driscoll after receiving a call from casting director Maureen Hughes. Appearing onstage in The Lieutenant of Inishmore in the Town Hall, Galway at the time, McDonnell, alongside two other cast members, left for Dublin to read a script for the original Single-Handed director Colm McCarthy. He was given the lead role one day later.

== Reception ==
The series has been consistently popular in Ireland since its first broadcast, with the first series receiving a 40% audience share. However, leading actor Owen McDonnell has been able to escape a significant increase in recognition by the general public as, according to him, "once you're out of the uniform you're fairly anonymous".

=== Irish Critics ===
==== Positive reviews ====
John Boland, writing in the Irish Independent, praised the original Single-Handed for its "taut and suggestive" screenplay. Heralding it as "the real deal" and "that rare oddity—an RTE drama that works" and drawing comparisons to the Roman Polanski film Chinatown, he said "it didn't lose its nerve by resorting to far-fetched plot twists or ludicrous melodrama". Boland's report on the sequel indicated his view that it "wasn't as arresting as its predecessor but it was a superior drama all the same". Boland viewed Single-Handed: The Drowning Man as also being a "superior drama" whilst "a sense of place was arrestingly captured, too".

==== Negative reviews ====
Gavin Corbett, writing in the Sunday Tribune, dismissed the original series as "an uninspired piece of writing brought to some sort of lugubrious half-life, superficially engaging for a while, but growing more and more ponderous and pofaced the longer it went on over its two nights". Patrick Freyne, also writing in the Sunday Tribune, called Single-Handed 3 "all puffed up with a melodramatic 'I-can't-believe-it's-not-drama' form of drama in which people glare at one another, shout, are unhelpfully abrasive for no reason, and give each other symbolic bullets".

=== British reception ===
The UK debut of Single-Handed received 4 million viewers which is a large viewership number.

==== Positive reviews ====
The Daily Telegraph, a broadsheet in the UK, said Single-Handed was "distinctly classy" and "not soft-centred. In fact it's more like biting into an apple only to find there's a worm in it". The regional newspaper, Leicester Mercury, remarked that it "confounds expectations from the very beginning", saying "it was dark, not dreary. And slow, not stupid. There wasn't even a hint of Irish whimsy about it. No-one's eyes twinkled, humorously. No fiddly jigs and reels drifted from the pub. And no-one—praise be—mentioned the damned craic".

==== Negative reviews ====
When Single-Handed eventually aired in the UK in 2009, Boland noted the reactions of the British newspaper critics, remarking satirically on how "The Guardian's Sam Wollaston and The Independent's Tom Sutcliffe couldn't contain their surprise that dark doings lurked behind the 'stunning scenery' of this Irish Hoirtbeat. Faith and begorrah, lads, shure we're even in the EU".

=== Awards ===
==== Irish Film and Television Awards ====
Single-Handed received one nomination at the Irish Film and Television Awards in 2008. It was nominated in the Drama Series/Soap category but lost to The Tudors.

Year	Nominee / work	Award	Result
2008	Single-Handed	Drama Series/Soap	Nominated

==== Seoul International Drama Awards ====
Single Handed 3: The Drowning Man received two nominations at the Seoul International Drama Awards. Anthony Byrne was nominated in the Best Director category and Barry Simner was nominated in the Best Writer category.

Year	Nominee / work	Award	Result
2009	Anthony Byrne	Best Director	Nominated
2009	Barry Simner	Best Writer	Nominated

== Episodes ==
Episodes	Title	Directed by	Written by	Original release date
1.1	"Home" "Natural Justice"	Colm McCarthy	Barry Simner	18 March 2007
1.2	"Home" "Natural Justice"	Colm McCarthy	Barry Simner	19 March 2007
In the first series, titled Home on RTÉ and Natural Justice on ITV, Sergeant Driscoll returns to his home town from Dublin, replacing his retired father, Sergeant Gerry Driscoll (Ian McElhinney). He soon realises that his father is involved in some sinister occurrences. He investigates the mysterious death of a young eastern European woman and by the end of the episode he has begun a relationship with another woman who he later finds is his half-sister.
2.1	"The Stolen Child"	Antony Byrne	Barry Simner	1 January 2008
2.2	"The Stolen Child"	Antony Byrne	Barry Simner	2 January 2008
Sergeant Driscoll searches for a kidnapped toddler from a dysfunctional family background. There are also two subplots involving a teacher suspected to be a paedophile and the appearance of Driscoll's father at a tribunal, the latter echoing the factual events of the long-running Morris Tribunal.
3.1	"The Drowning Man"	Antony Byrne	Barry Simner	12 April 2009
3.2	"The Drowning Man"	Antony Byrne	Barry Simner	13 April 2009
Sergeant Driscoll receives a late-night phone call informing him that a young man is drowning. Jack finds this is connected with an undercover anti-drug operation against a wealthy businessman with connections to the IRA. Driscoll meets up again with his former lover, Maura Dooley (Marcella Plunkett).
4.1	"The Lost Boys"	Thaddeus O'Sullivan	Barry Simner	7 November 2010
4.2	"The Lost Boys"	Thaddeus O'Sullivan	Barry Simner	14 November 2010
A visit from Jack's English cousin Brian leads to the unearthing of a devastating family secret, and the Garda sergeant must also deal with a troubled teenager who is the chief suspect in the murder of an elderly recluse.
4.3	"Between Two Fires"	Charlie McCarthy	Colin Teevan	21 November 2010
4.4	"Between Two Fires"	Charlie McCarthy	Colin Teevan	28 November 2010
Jack investigates a suspicious fire at a troubled housing development, but his loyalties are tested by the suspicion that an old friend may have been responsible. Meanwhile, Gemma falls out with Brian over his plan to stake a claim to Eithne's land.
4.5	"A Cold Heaven"	Thaddeus O'Sullivan	Clive Bradley	5 December 2010
4.6	"A Cold Heaven"	Thaddeus O'Sullivan	Clive Bradley	12 December 2010
Jack investigates a car accident involving a local teenager, and suspects that the girl is in an abusive relationship. However, he is unable to focus on the case due to tensions back at home, where he continues to be the subject of Brian's simmering hatred.

== Overseas ==
Under the name "Jack Driscoll," the series was aired at least twice in Denmark on the primary Public Service channel DR 1. The channel does not use adverting breaks, so each story was shown as a 90 to 100 episode.

In Finland, the national broadcaster Yle aired the first three seasons during 2017–2018 and the second run was in the spring/summer of 2020, under the name "Vastavirtaan" (Against the Current).
