= Run (American TV series) =

American television series

- Genre: Comedy thriller
- Created by: Vicky Jones
- Starring: Merritt Wever; Domhnall Gleeson
- Music by: Dickon Hinchliffe
- Country of origin: United States
- Original language: English
- No. of seasons: 1
- No. of episodes: 7

Production
- Executive producers: Vicky Jones; Jenny Robins; Kate Dennis; Phoebe Waller-Bridge; Emily Leo; Oliver Roskill; Lucan Toh (pilot only)
- Producers: Kevin Lafferty; D.J. Carson
- Cinematography: Matthew Clark; Kristin Fieldhouse
- Editors: Ant Boys; Katie Weiland
- Camera setup: Single-camera
- Running time: 26–33 minutes
- Production companies: DryWrite; Wild Swim; Entertainment One

Original release
- Network: HBO
- Release: April 12 – May 24, 2020

Run is an American comedy thriller television series created by Vicky Jones that premiered on April 12, 2020 on HBO. It stars Merritt Wever and Domhnall Gleeson, and one of its executive producers is Jones' frequent collaborator, Phoebe Waller-Bridge. Run's pilot episode was directed by Kate Dennis.

In July 2020, HBO canceled the series after one season.

== Premise ==
Ruby Richardson walks away from her ordinary life in the suburbs to revisit her past with her college boyfriend, Billy Johnson. The two made a pact 17 years earlier: If either one of them texted the word "RUN" and the other replied with the same, they would drop everything and meet in Grand Central Terminal and travel across America together.

— HBO

== Cast ==
=== Main ===
- Merritt Wever as Ruby Richardson, a woman looking to reinvent herself
- Domhnall Gleeson as Billy Johnson, a successful life guru

=== Recurring ===
- Phoebe Waller-Bridge as Laurel Halliday, a woman whom Ruby and Billy meet while on their journey
- Rich Sommer as Laurence Richardson, Ruby's husband
- Tamara Podemski as Babe Cloud, a police detective
- Archie Panjabi as Fiona, Billy's former personal assistant
- Shaun J. Brown as Ryan Everwood, a police detective
- Jake Bover as Scooter Richardson, Ruby's son
- Kelsey Flower as Daniel

=== Guest ===
- Stephen McKinley Henderson as John ("Run")
- Annie Golden as Marjorie ("Run")
- Maxwell Simkins as Hunter Richardson ("Chase")
- Deirdre Lovejoy as Mary Dixie ("Fuck")
- Saamer Usmani as Derek ("Kiss")

== Episodes ==
No.	Title	Directed by	Written by	Original release date	U.S. viewers (millions)
1	"Run"	Kate Dennis	Vicky Jones	April 12, 2020	0.352
After receiving a text that says "RUN", Ruby Richardson texts back "RUN", then abandons her husband to fly to New York City. She boards a train at Grand Central Station and finds her college boyfriend Billy waiting for her. Although excited to see each other, the two agree to a moratorium on any discussion of their present lives.
2	"Kiss"	Kate Dennis	Adam Countee	April 19, 2020	0.196
Ruby tries to seduce Billy but he is put off by his secret discovery that she has a husband and kids. Ruby attributes his reluctance to her being older and tries to seduce a stranger to make him jealous. An off-hand remark Billy makes about her age causes Ruby to abort the trip and leave the train, only to realize that she may be out of options, as her husband has canceled all her credit/debit cards, and has left a nasty greeting for all to hear on his voicemail.
3	"Fuck"	Kate Dennis	David Iserson	April 26, 2020	0.291
After getting off the train in Chicago, Ruby is chased down by Billy, who proposes they spend the next 24 hours in the city. He takes Ruby on a boat tour, and is surprised to hear that Ruby lied about being an architect. He withdraws all his cash from his bank, as he is trying to protect his money from his personal assistant, Fiona, who has been tracking him through his phone; meanwhile, Ruby tries on expensive dresses and meets a kind stranger, Alice, who encourages her to shoplift a dress. Billy and Ruby get a luxury hotel suite together, where they have sex, but Alice, revealed to be Fiona, tapes them via her cellphone under the door.
4	"Chase"	Kate Dennis	Georgia Pritchett	May 3, 2020	0.208
After their Chicago detour, Billy and Ruby re-board. While trying to contact her husband, Ruby meets "Alice" onboard the train and confides in her that Billy is carrying a big bag of cash with him. After Alice reveals that she is Fiona to Ruby, she blackmails her into giving up the bag of cash, threatening to send the recording of Billy and Ruby having sex to Ruby's husband. Ruby hands the bag over but then she and Billy furiously scour the train for Fiona in an attempt to reclaim the cash, only for Fiona to jump off the train.
5	"Jump"	Natalie Bailey	Kirstie Swain	May 10, 2020	0.202
Billy and Ruby jump off the train to try to chase down Fiona and secure the bag of money. They track her to a seemingly abandoned cottage where the three have a confrontation and Billy reveals that he knows Ruby is a mother. To evade the couple, Fiona tries to jump out of a window onto a haystack only to be impaled by spokes hidden in the hay. Realizing that they will be suspects in Fiona's death, Billy and Ruby try to cover their tracks and return to the nearest train station. They are given a ride by Laurel, a friendly taxidermist, to the Trinidad, Colorado station. However, before they can board their train, Ruby realizes that she forgot her phone at the cottage, and Billy convinces her that they must go back to retrieve it.
6	"Tell"	Natalie Bailey	Vicky Jones	May 17, 2020	0.167
Billy and Ruby return to the cottage, and Ruby manages to secure her phone. Meanwhile, Laurel, who is friendly with the cottage owner, comes by to drop off some food and sees Fiona's body. She notifies the police. Billy decides he wants to notify the police about Fiona's death but Ruby tries to put him off the idea, revealing that she is scared she will lose her kids if her husband discovers she is with Billy. Billy decides he owes it to Fiona to notify the police, and decides to come forward alone about her death. Before they part ways, Ruby asks him to go with her to a bar where she can have a drink. Laurel is interviewed by a policewoman about Fiona's death and reveals that she saw two hitchhikers that night. She persuades the policewoman to go with her to a bar where she is booked for karaoke and the two awkwardly flirt. Laurel reveals that the only thing she remembers about the hitchhikers is that she gave the man her jacket. At the same bar, Ruby tells Billy that their train is relatively close by and has a stop-over. The two decide to get back on the train. Billy accidentally leaves Laurel's jacket behind and she is surprised to discover it when she walks up to the bar to get a drink.
7	"Trick"	Kevin Bray	Adam Countee	May 24, 2020	0.211
Ruby and Billy make the train. In a rush of euphoria, Ruby tells Billy she wants to leave her husband to be with him. However Ruby later watches the video Billy made pitching his idea of meeting Ruby only so he can write a book about it. Ruby contacts Detective Cloud who boards the train but is unable to find Billy. The train arrives in LA. Before he can be arrested, Billy interrupts Ruby's reunion with her husband and children, and he begs her to acknowledge that he truly loves her. Instead, she walks back to be with her family.

== Reception ==
=== Critical response ===
The review aggregator website Rotten Tomatoes reported an 84% approval rating with an average rating of 7.04/10, based on 38 reviews. The website's critical consensus states, "Though it can't always sustain its frenetic pace, Run's sharp subversions of romcom clichés are never less than entertaining thanks to Merritt Wever and Domhnall Gleeson's electrifying performances." On Metacritic, it has a weighted average score of 74 out of 100, based on 21 critics, indicating "generally favorable reviews". Alan Sepinwall of Rolling Stone praised the two central performances, with Wever in particular garnering critical acclaim. He wrote that "the heat between them is palpable enough to carry this oddball mix of sexual farce and Alfred Hitchcock thriller".

=== Ratings ===
Viewership and ratings per episode of Run
No.	Title	Air date	Rating (18–49)	Viewers (millions)	DVR (18–49)	DVR viewers (millions)	Total (18–49)	Total viewers (millions)
1	"Run"	April 12, 2020	0.12	0.352	TBD	TBD	TBD	TBD
2	"Kiss"	April 19, 2020	0.06	0.196	TBD	TBD	TBD	TBD
3	"Fuck"	April 26, 2020	0.09	0.291	TBD	TBD	TBD	TBD
4	"Chase"	May 3, 2020	0.06	0.208	TBD	TBD	TBD	TBD
5	"Jump"	May 10, 2020	0.06	0.202	TBD	TBD	TBD	TBD
6	"Tell"	May 17, 2020	0.06	0.167	TBD	TBD	TBD	TBD
7	"Trick"	May 24, 2020	0.06	0.211	TBD	TBD	TBD	TBD
