= Olivia Ross =

French actress (born 1992)

- Born: 28 April 1992 (age 34); Paris, France
- Education: Kellogg School of Management; Colby College
- Occupation: Actress

Olivia Ross (born 28 April 1992) is a French actress. She is known for roles in Killing Eve and Knightfall.

== Biography ==
Ross was born on 28 April 1992 in Paris, France. She studied at the Kellogg School of Management and graduated from Colby College. She also studied at a drama school in London. She began her acting career in plays at Shakespeare's Globe Theatre. In 2007, she played a role in the French film production Tout est pardonné. In the following years, she received supporting roles in other French film productions, for example, in 2009 in Someone I Loved and Father of My Children. In 2015, she played the role of Mathilde Perrucci in three episodes of the miniseries Nordkurve. The following year, she played the role of Mademoiselle Bourienne in the miniseries War and Peace. From 2017 to 2018, she played the historical role of Queen Joanna in ten episodes of the television series Knightfall. She had a major series role in 2019 in Trauma – The Case of Adam Belmont.

== Filmography (selection) ==
- 2007: Tout est pardonné
- 2009: Ada (short film)
- 2009: Someone I Loved (Je l'aimais)
- 2009: The father of my children (Le père de mes enfants)
- 2009: Le voyage au Japon (short film)
- 2010: Carlos – Der Schakal (Carlos / Le prix du Chacal, miniseries, Episode 1x03)
- 2013: Shakespeare’s Globe: Henry V
- 2013: White Lie
- 2014: Rosemary's Baby (Miniseries, Episode 1x02)
- 2014: Shakespeare’s Globe: A Midsummer Night’s Dream
- 2014: Eden – Lost in Music (Eden)
- 2014: The Undertaker (short film)
- 2014: Page One (short film)
- 2015: Nordkurve (Virage Nord, Miniseries, 3 episodes)
- 2015: Jealousy (short film)
- 2016: Krieg und Frieden (War & Peace, miniseries, 6 episodes)
- 2016: Souffler plus fort que la mer
- 2016: Personal Shopper
- 2016: Chubby Funny
- 2017–2018: Knightfall (TV series, 10 episodes)
- 2018: Killing Eve (TV series, 2 episodes)
- 2018: Zwischen den Zeilen (Doubles vies)
- 2019: Dernier amour
- 2019: Trauma – Der Fall Adam Belmont (Trauma, TV series, 6 episodes)
- 2020: The Old Guard
- 2020: Wie wir uns fanden (Claire Andrieux, TV film)
- 2022: Hiraeth (short film)
- 2023: White Bird (White Bird: A Wonder Story)
- 2023: The Universal Theory
- 2024: Niki de Saint Phalle (Niki)
- 2025: The Sentinels (Irène Ferraud, TV series)

== Synchronizations (selection) ==
- 2018: Bard's Tale IV (computer game)
