= Owen McDonnell =

Irish actor

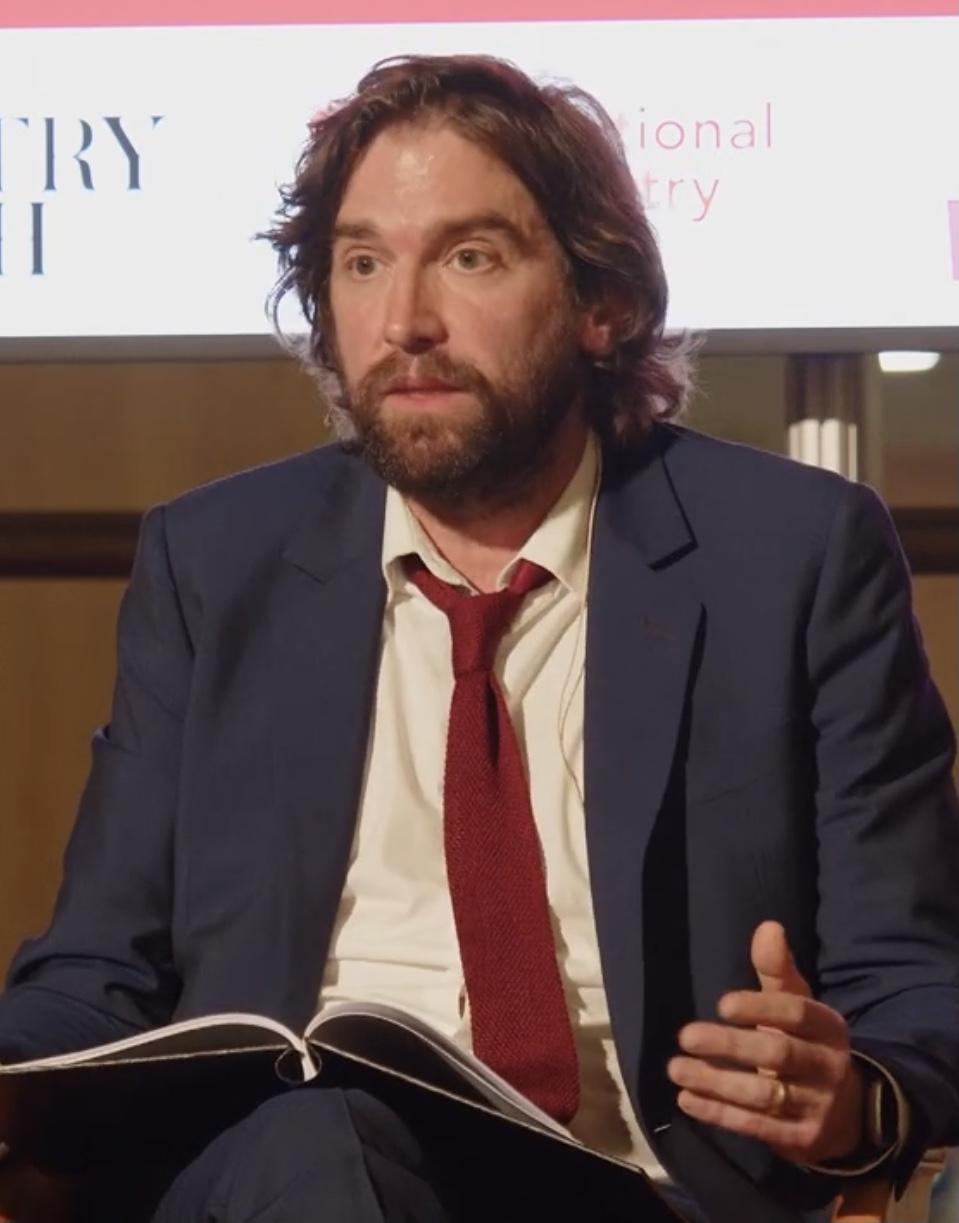
- McDonnell at the British Library in 2022
- Born: 1974 (age 51–52); Galway, Ireland
- Occupation: Actor

Owen McDonnell (born 1974) is an Irish actor. He is known for his roles in the RTÉ drama Single-Handed (2007–2010), the TG4 Western An Klondike (2015–2017), and the BBC spy thriller Killing Eve (2018–2022).

== Early life ==
McDonnell was born in Galway, Ireland. He attended the Central School of Speech and Drama in London, England, moving to the city in 1996. Before breaking into film and television, McDonnell did a lot of theatre in Ireland and the United Kingdom.

== Career ==
McDonnell had a role in the 2003 feature film Conspiracy of Silence. It was RTÉ Television's police drama Single-Handed that was McDonnell's television career break. He starred in all four series of the programme and was nominated for an IFTA Award for the role in 2011. McDonnell was given the lead role of Garda Sergeant Jack Driscoll after receiving a call from casting director Maureen Hughes. Appearing onstage in The Lieutenant of Inishmore in Galway Town Hall at the time, McDonnell, alongside two other cast members, left for Dublin to read the script for the original Single-Handed director Colm McCarthy. He was given the lead role a day later.

McDonnell appeared in RTÉ's Wild Decembers, MI5 thriller Spooks on BBC One, crime thriller Silent Witness also on BBC One, and the first two series of sitcom Mount Pleasant on Sky1.

In 2014 McDonnell starred as Inspector Fiachra Greene in the Irish language movie An Bronntanas (The Gift), screened at the Galway Film Fleadh and later put forward as Ireland's submission for the Best Foreign Language Film category at the 87th Academy Awards (2015). The film is edited from the five-episode television series of the same name, screened on TG4 in October and November 2014.

In 2015 McDonnell starred in the hit TG4 series An Klondike, a western set in the Klondike gold rush. In 2016 he starred in Wrecking the Rising, about time travelling gobdaws who accidentally kill PH Pearse before the Easter Rising, and in the short film An Béal Bocht based on Flann O'Brien's satirical novel.

In 2018, McDonnell first appeared as Niko Polastri, husband to Sandra Oh's title character in Killing Eve. Upon meeting him at the first script read-throughs, Oh immediately felt that their on-screen relationship would be believable, and would serve as an important grounding force for her character.

== Personal life ==
McDonnell lives in London with his British girlfriend Jill. They have two children.

== Filmography ==
Year(s)	Title	Role	Notes
2003	Conspiracy of Silence	Noel	
2007–10	Single-Handed	Sergeant Jack Driscoll	RTÉ
2008	An Ranger	An Ranger	(Short film)
2009	Wild Decembers	Joseph Brennan	RTÉ
2009	Spooks (series 8)	Vadim Robinov	BBC (guest star)
2009	Rásaí na Gaillimhe	Eamonn O'Connell	TG4
2010	Rewind	Brendan	
2011	Daybreak	Himself (Guest)	ITV
2011–12	Mount Pleasant	Jack	Sky1 (series 1 and 2)
2011	The Wright Stuff	Himself (Guest)	Channel 5
2012	A Year of Greater Love	Neil	(TV film)
2012	Saving the Titanic	Thomas Dillon	(TV film)
2013	A Terrible Beauty	Ned Daly	(TV film)
2013	Ghost Train	Michael	(Short film)
2013	Made in Belfast	Smith	
2013	Scéal	Morris	TG4 (Short TV film)
2014	The Question	Dr. Fialan	(Short film)
2014	Silent Witness (Series 17)	Ryan Kelvin	BBC (guest star, episode: "Fraternity")
2014	An Bronntanas	Inspector Fiachra Greene	TG4 (film and TV series)
2014	Swung	David	Sigma Films (feature film)
2015–2017	An Klondike	Tom Connolly	TG4 (film and TV series)
2016	My Mother and Other Strangers	Michael Coyne	BBC/RTÉ
2017	Paula	McArthur	BBC/RTÉ
2018–2022	Killing Eve	Niko Polastri	BBC America
2018	Women on the Verge	Sean	
2021	The Bay	Frank Mercer	
2021	Three Families	Mark Ryan	BBC
2022	Love & Gelato	Howard	Netflix
2023	Great Expectations	Joe	BBC
2024	Bad Sisters	Ian Reilly	Apple TV+
2024	True Detective	Raymond Clark	HBO
