= Killing Eve =

British black comedy-drama thriller television series (2018–2022)

- Genre: Spy thriller; Drama; Black comedy; Comedy-drama
- Based on: Villanelle by Luke Jennings
- Showrunners: Phoebe Waller-Bridge; Emerald Fennell; Suzanne Heathcote; Laura Neal
- Starring: Sandra Oh; Jodie Comer; Fiona Shaw; Darren Boyd; Owen McDonnell; Kirby Howell-Baptiste; David Haig; Kim Bodnia; Sean Delaney; Nina Sosanya; Edward Bluemel; Henry Lloyd-Hughes; Adrian Scarborough; Adeel Akhtar; Raj Bajaj; Turlough Convery; Steve Pemberton; Danny Sapani; Harriet Walter; Gemma Whelan; Camille Cottin; Anjana Vasan; Robert Gilbert; Laurentiu Possa; Ingvar Sigurdsson; Marie-Sophie Ferdane
- Composers: David Holmes; Keefus Ciancia
- Country of origin: United Kingdom
- Original language: English
- No. of series: 4
- No. of episodes: 32 (list of episodes)

Production
- Executive producers: Sally Gentle; Lee Morris; Phoebe Waller-Bridge; Emerald Fennell; Gina Mingacci; Sandra Oh; Damon Thomas
- Producers: Colin Wratten; Elinor Day
- Camera setup: Single-camera
- Running time: 40–43 minutes
- Production companies: Sid Gentle Films; BBC America Original Production; Endeavor Content

Original release
- Network: BBC America
- Release: 8 April 2018 – 17 April 2022

Related
- Honey

Killing Eve is a British dramedy and spy thriller television series produced in the United Kingdom by Sid Gentle Films for BBC America and BBC Three. The series follows Eve Polastri (Sandra Oh), a British intelligence investigator tasked with capturing psychopathic assassin Villanelle (Jodie Comer). As the chase progresses, the two develop a mutual obsession. Based on the Villanelle novel series by Luke Jennings, each of the show's series is led by a different female head writer. The first series had Phoebe Waller-Bridge as the head writer, the second series Emerald Fennell, the third series Suzanne Heathcote, and the fourth series Laura Neal.

The first series premiered on BBC America on 8 April 2018, and on BBC iPlayer on 15 September 2018 through BBC Three. The third series premiered on 12 April 2020 for BBC America, and on 13 April 2020 for BBC iPlayer, and concluded on 31 May 2020. The fourth (and final) series premiered on 27 February 2022 on BBC America, 28 February 2022 on BBC iPlayer and 5 March 2022 on BBC One and concluded on 17 April 2022.

The first two series were critically acclaimed, but the last two series received more mixed reviews. The fourth series, and its final episode in particular drew significant backlash from critics and audiences. The show broke weekly ratings increase records, and received several accolades, including British Academy Television Award for Best Drama Series. Both Oh and Comer were praised for their performances, winning the Golden Globe Award for Best Actress – Television Series Drama and the Primetime Emmy Award for Outstanding Lead Actress in a Drama Series, respectively. Comer and Fiona Shaw also received British Academy Television Awards for their performances.

== Synopsis ==
In the first series, Eve is bored with her protection role in MI5 and, after brashly investigating the behind-the-scenes murder of a witness she is handling, she is fired. However, her passion for female assassins later leads to her joining an undercover division within MI6 whose task is to pursue and locate Villanelle, a ruthless international assassin who works for a secret organization called The Twelve. When Eve and Villanelle cross paths, they begin a cycle of obsession which leads them away from their individual missions and closer to each other.

In the second series, after a violent encounter at the end of series one, Eve and Villanelle resume their obsessive relationship while continuing their separate missions. Eve works to solve kills set by The Twelve while Villanelle continues to kill for The Twelve; however, after a new killer appears on the scene, the focus changes for The Twelve and MI6, as both women are pitted to work with each other. A dangerous mission leads Eve and Villanelle to Rome where their own lives are at stake.

The third series picks up six months after the fallout of the mission in Rome. Eve, traumatised by her near-death experience at the hands of Villanelle, quits MI6 and begins living a low-profile existence, whilst Villanelle attempts to discover new ways of earning a living after she stops killing for The Twelve. However, the unexpected arrival of her former Twelve trainer leads Villanelle to question who she really is and if killing is what she's made for, whereas Eve begins looking into The Twelve again after they murder someone close to her, leading both women to cross paths once more.

The fourth and final series picks up soon after the third with Eve now desperate for revenge on The Twelve whilst Villanelle is eager to change for Eve. However, due to their different outlooks on their personal missions, Eve and Villanelle begin to clash leading them off into their separate directions but both eventually aiming for the same goal, destroying The Twelve.

== Cast and characters ==
=== Main ===
- Sandra Oh as Eve Polastri, an analyst with MI5 who becomes tirelessly preoccupied with a notorious assassin and is recruited on an off-the-books basis to the foreign intelligence agency MI6
- Jodie Comer as Oksana Astankova / Villanelle, a psychopathic and skilled assassin, who becomes obsessed with the MI6 officer who is tracking her
  - Comer also plays "Jesus Christ" (who appears as Villanelle in drag), with Penny Ashmore as her body double (recurring series 4)
- Fiona Shaw as Carolyn Martens, head of the Russia Section at MI6
  - Imogen Daines as Young Carolyn / "Janice" (guest series 4)
- Kim Bodnia as Konstantin Vasiliev, Villanelle's handler
  - Louis Bodnia Andersen as Young Konstantin / "Karl" (guest series 4)
- Owen McDonnell as Niko Polastri, Eve's English-Polish husband, a maths teacher and bridge player (series 1–3; guest series 4)
- Sean Delaney as Kenneth "Kenny" Stowton, Carolyn's son, an ex-hacker who has been recruited by MI6. He later becomes a journalist for Bitter Pill. (series 1–3)
- Darren Boyd as Frank Haleton, Eve's supervisor at MI5 (series 1)
- David Haig as Bill Pargrave, Eve's MI5 associate who comes with her to MI6 (series 1; guest series 4)
- Kirby Howell-Baptiste as Elena Felton, Eve's assistant (series 1; guest series 4)
- Nina Sosanya as Jess, an experienced MI6 agent now working as a part of Eve's team (series 2)
- Edward Bluemel as Hugo Turner, a wealthy Oxford graduate, who is working as a part of Eve's team at MI6 (series 2; recurring series 4)
- Henry Lloyd-Hughes as Aaron Peel, the heir to a tech company following the assassination of his father, mogul Alistair Peel (series 2)
- Adrian Scarborough as Raymond, a member of the Twelve and one of Villanelle's former handlers (series 2)
- Adeel Akhtar as Martin, the British Intelligence expert on psychopaths (series 2 and 4)
- Raj Bajaj as Mo Jafari, a new MI6 agent working for Carolyn (series 3)
- Turlough Convery as Bear, Kenny's colleague at Bitter Pill (series 3)
- Steve Pemberton as Paul Bradwell, an MI6 supervisor (series 3)
- Danny Sapani as Jamie Hayward, Kenny's boss at Bitter Pill (series 3)
- Harriet Walter as Dasha Duzran, a hard-bitten one-time Olympic gymnast turned spy, Villanelle's former trainer and mentor (series 3)
- Gemma Whelan as Geraldine Stowton, Carolyn's daughter and Kenny's older sister (series 3)
- Camille Cottin as Hélène, a high-ranking member of the Twelve (series 3–4)
- Anjana Vasan as Pamela "Pam" Palmeira, Hélène's newest assassin recruit who works at a funeral home (series 4)
- Robert Gilbert as Yusuf, Eve's associate (series 4)
- Laurentiu Possa as Vladimir "Vlad" Betkin, Carolyn's Russian associate (series 4; guest series 1)
- Ingvar Sigurdsson as Lars Meier, a member of the Twelve who has ties with Carolyn (series 4)
  - Siggi Ingvarsson as Young Lars / "Johan" (guest series 4)
- Marie-Sophie Ferdane as Gunn, a seasoned assassin for the Twelve (series 4)

=== Recurring ===
- Sonia Elliman as Madame Tattevin, Villanelle's neighbour at her apartment building in Paris (series 1; guest series 2)
- Billy Matthews as Dominik Wolanski, a young bridge player (series 1)
- Olivia Ross as Nadia Kadomtseva, an assassin for the Twelve and Villanelle's former love interest (series 1)
- Susan Lynch as Anna, Villanelle's former languages teacher and love interest (series 1)
- Yuli Lagodinsky as Irina Vasilieva, Konstantin's young daughter (series 1, 3–4)
- Shannon Tarbet as Amber Peel, Aaron's sister (series 2)
- Emma Pierson as Gemma, a teacher colleague of Niko's (series 2)
- Jung Sun den Hollander as Jin / The Ghost, a rival assassin hired by Aaron (series 2)
- Ayoola Smart as Audrey, Kenny's girlfriend and a co-worker at Bitter Pill (series 3)
- Alexandra Roach as Rhian Bevan, a rival assassin for the Twelve (series 3)
- Steve Oram as Phil, a vicar (series 4)
- Zindzi Hudson as May, Phil's daughter (series 4)
- Manpreet Bachu as Elliot Palmeira, Pam's brother and boss at the funeral home (series 4)
- Anyastassia Melehes as Chloe, Hélène's daughter (series 4)
- Monica Lopera as Fernanda, Lars' ex-wife and Hélène's ex-lover (series 4)
- Anna-Maria Everett as Benita, Carolyn's temporary caretaker in Havana, Cuba (series 4)
- Josh Zaré as Darren, a carnival worker who falls for Pam (series 4)

=== Guest ===
- Remo Girone as Cesare Greco, a target of Villanelle's (series 1)
- Charlie Hamblett as Sebastian, a neighbour of Villanelle's with whom she begins a relationship (series 1)
- Edward Akrout as Diego, a know-it-all assassin working with Villanelle (series 1)
- Ken Nwosu as Max Sanford (series 1)
- Julian Barratt as Julian, an older man who lets Villanelle stay with him (series 2)
- Zoë Wanamaker as Helen Jacobsen, a senior British Intelligence official and Carolyn's boss (series 2)
- Dominic Mafham as Charles Kruger, the accountant for the Twelve (series 3)
- Rebecca Saire as Bertha Kruger, the wife of Charles (series 3)
- Evgenia Dodina as Tatiana, Oksana's mother (series 3)
- Predrag Bjelac as Grigoriy, Tatiana's new husband (series 3)

== Production ==
Sally Woodward Gentle, of Sid Gentle Films, optioned Luke Jennings's Codename Villanelle in 2014, saying that "the notion of a female assassin was not unique", but that Jennings's take was "fresh, intelligent and tonally much bolder than others", adding that she was particularly interested because "It wasn't exploitative. We really enjoyed the character of Villanelle and the inventiveness of her kills, but we were particularly engaged with the mutual obsession between the women". Jennings's story began as a four-part novella published between 2014 and 2016. Following the stage success of Fleabag, Phoebe Waller-Bridge was recruited to write the show, which was then commissioned by BBC America in November 2016.

=== Casting ===
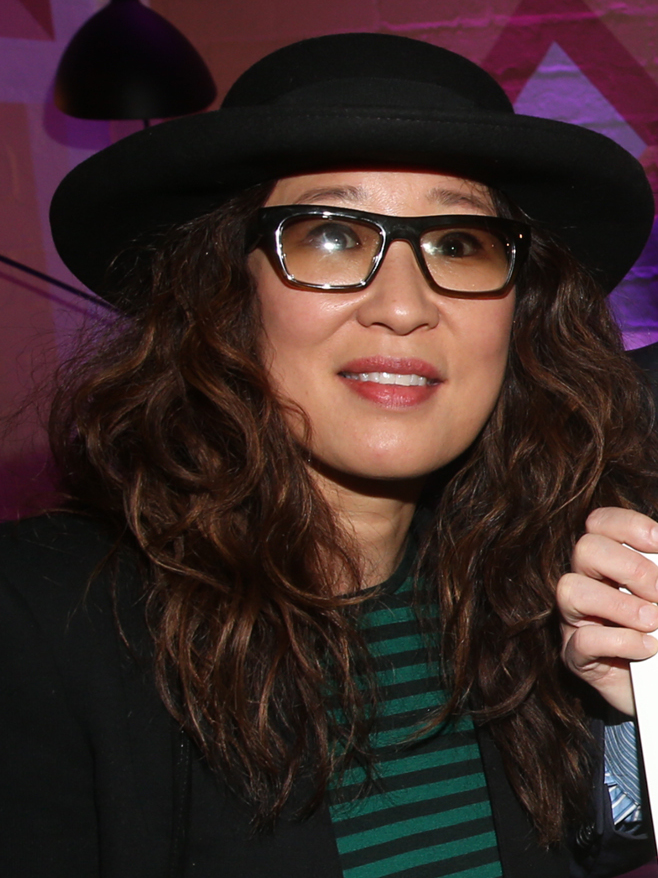
Sandra Oh portrays Eve Polastri

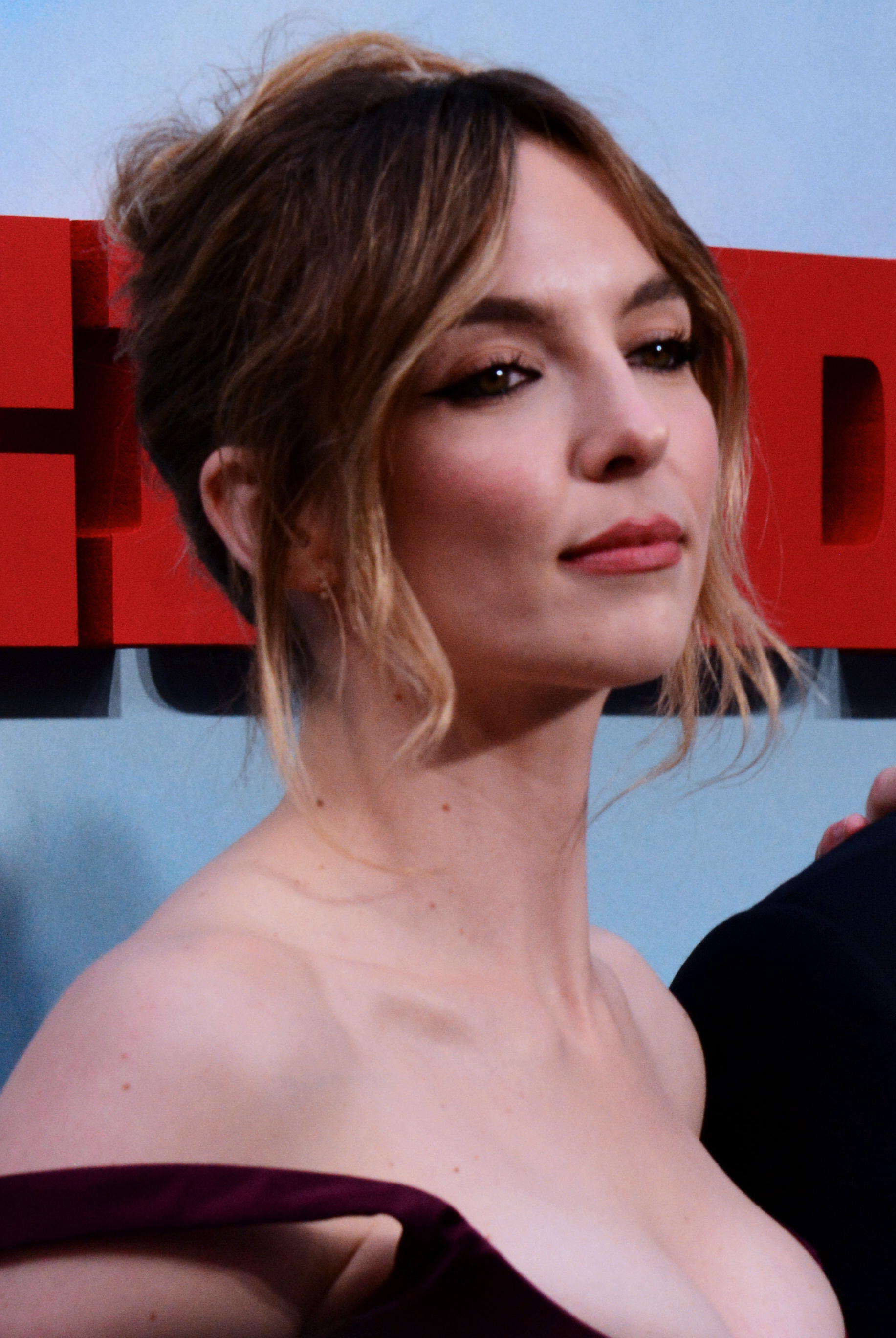
Jodie Comer portrays Villanelle

Sandra Oh was the first to be cast in June 2017, as the title character Eve Polastri, and IMG agreed distribution rights later that month. Oh reportedly was confused over which character she would be playing when she first received a breakdown, thinking that she would not have the option to audition for the young assassin and not even considering the lead. Later her agents informed her that she would be reading for the role of Eve.

For the role of Villanelle, the production considered over 100 actresses before Jodie Comer was cast, about a month after Oh. Sally Woodward Gentle told Backstage that the production "didn't want Villanelle to be like Nikita or The Girl With the Dragon Tattoo—that male fantasy version of what a woman who'd come for them might look like. We wanted her to be able to disappear into a crowd". Comer's first audition involved acting out the kitchen scene from "I Have a Thing About Bathrooms" with Oh, where the two clicked.

Initially, Waller-Bridge considered casting herself as either Eve or Villanelle, but discarded this idea as she wanted a larger age gap between the leads. Kirby Howell-Baptiste was cast as Elena in August 2017.

In August 2019, Deadline Hollywood announced that Harriet Walter and Danny Sapani had joined the cast for the third series. More cast additions were revealed in November, including Gemma Whelan, Predrag Bjelac, Camille Cottin, Steve Pemberton, Raj Bajaj, Turlough Convery, and Evgenia Dodina.

=== Filming ===
Filming for the first series began on 17 July 2017 in Tuscany, extending to further locations in Paris, Berlin, Bucharest, Cheshunt, Turville, London and West London Film Studios. The Viennese Cafe opening scenes were shot at Bar Garibaldi in Colle di Val d'Elsa, a small hilltop town north west of Siena, Tuscany. The building used as Eve's base is in Warwick House Street, just off Trafalgar Square. In the London pub scene, the external shot shows The Albert pub in Victoria Street; the interiors were of the dark-panelled Old Nick in Sandland Street. In episode three, Villanelle lures David Haig's character Bill Pargrave into tailing her out of Berlin Friedrichstraße station and along a neighbouring Berlin tramway street before entering a busy nightclub, the location of which was Fabric, opposite London's Smithfield Market. Bucharest's neoclassical Romanian Athenaeum concert hall was converted into a decadent café for the penultimate Moscow scene. Filming also took place at Nell's Café, a popular roadside café off the A2 near Gravesend in Kent, as well as at the nearby M2 motorway. Filming also took place at the Radcliffe Camera in Oxford and production concluded on 15 December 2017.

Production for the second series began on 16 July 2018 and concluded on 14 December.

Filming for the third series began in August 2019, Filming locations included Viscri and Comandău in Romania. Additionally, several locations were used in Barcelona, Spain, among them the Arc de Triomf on Passeig de Lluís Companys and the Port Vell Aerial Tramway. The interior of Villanelle's Barcelona apartment was shot inside the Casa Ramos, a noted Modernista apartment block in the Plaça de Lesseps which was designed in 1906 by the architect Jaume Torres i Grau. Production for the third series ended in January 2020 in London.

Filming for the fourth and final series began on 7 June 2021 and ended on 6 November 2021. Margate in Kent features throughout Episodes four to seven, with filming taking place on the beach, various streets, Dreamland, the Nayland Rock Hotel and Sands Café.

=== Music ===
The band Unloved, featuring Jade Vincent, Keefus Ciancia, and David Holmes, were commissioned to score the series.

=== Renewal ===
Shortly before its premiere, Killing Eve was renewed for a second series. Luke Jennings's sequel, Killing Eve: No Tomorrow, was published in March 2019, shortly before the second-series premiere; the book is said to diverge from the television series, but also to "share common DNA" because of Jennings's continued collaboration with the creators. In July 2018, The Hollywood Reporter reported that Waller-Bridge delegated some responsibility for the second series, hiring Emerald Fennell as head writer, and Lisa Brühlmann and Francesca Gregorini as directors.

Less than twelve hours after the premiere of the second series, BBC America renewed the series for a third. Suzanne Heathcote served as showrunner, so that each new season of Killing Eve brought on a new female showrunner.

On 3 January 2020, Killing Eve was renewed for a fourth series ahead of the premiere of the third series. On 20 February, Laura Neal was announced as the head writer as well as an executive producer of the fourth series. In March 2021, it was confirmed that the fourth series would be its last.

== Episodes and broadcast ==
Series of Killing Eve
Series	Episodes	Originally released	
Series	Episodes	First released	Last released
1	8	8 April 2018	27 May 2018
2	8	7 April 2019	26 May 2019
3	8	12 April 2020	31 May 2020
4	8	27 February 2022	10 April 2022

In the United Kingdom, the first series was shown on BBC One in September 2018 and as stream-only on BBC Three. The first episode was broadcast on 15 September 2018, and seen by 8.25 million viewers within the first twenty-eight days. The second series was released in its entirety on BBC iPlayer on 8 June 2019, with its first episode being shown on BBC One the same day. The third series was released 6 am every Monday from 13 April 2020 on BBC iPlayer.

Irish broadcaster RTÉ2 was the first broadcaster in Europe to premiere the show, with the first episode broadcast to 76,000 viewers on 27 August 2018. The final series will premiere on 1 March 2022 on RTÉ One.

In New Zealand, second-series episodes premiered two days before their US broadcast on TVNZ Ondemand. Episodes will air on TVNZ 2 the same day as the US broadcast. The second series began broadcasting on 7 April 2019, shown concurrently in the United States by both BBC America and AMC.

In Canada, the series debuted on 22 July 2018 on Bravo! The series continues to be broadcast on the channel which is now branded as CTV Drama Channel. It is also available on the Canadian streaming network Crave.

On 14 February 2020, it was announced that the third series would premiere on 26 April 2020; however, the premiere date was later moved up to 12 April 2020.

== Themes ==
=== Intertwined characterisations ===
In The New Yorker, Jia Tolentino characterised both Polastri and Villanelle as "deeply strange" and possessed of a "wild, unlikely interior weirdness and flux", writing that it seemed equally possible that they "could team up, or try to kill each other, or fall into bed". Judy Berman wrote in The New York Times that Agent Polastri tracks assassin Villanelle not as hero and villain but as "two broken women whose flaws bind them together in a twisted pas de deux". Villanelle is romantically interested in women and, as Willa Paskin wrote in Slate, is captivated by Polastri perhaps in part because of a "shared brusqueness".

Despite being enemies professionally, both characters are professional, child-free women, "hard-working, ambitious, and slightly obsessive", whose respective worlds "betrayed and deceived them at every turn". Melanie McFarland wrote in Slate that they are "two of a kind" and "can trust in each other's constancy", with Priscilla Frak writing in The Huffington Post that both women are "fueled by a volatile cocktail of ambition, curiosity and morbid adoration". Angelica Jade Bastién wrote in Vulture that, with Eve, Villanelle "feels something beyond (the) crushing boredom" she normally experiences, while Eve looks at Villanelle as "an escape into feminine excess". Perceiving "mirror-image similarities between them, for the good and the bad", executive director Emerald Fennell posited the question, "What does it look like when a psychopath starts to learn how to feel things, and when a woman who's incredibly empathetic and intuitive starts to lose those parts of herself?"

Fennell also said that the Eve and Villanelle relationship will always be the core of the show, in accordance with the perception of BBC reviewer Caryn James who wrote that the "series' true allure is the deeply complicated love-hate dynamic between those two characters", NPR's reviewer Terry Gross' view that the character dynamic "sets Killing Eve apart from other thrillers", and a Dan Snierson review in Entertainment Weekly that the series portrays "TV's most mesmerizing, twisted relationship".

=== Contrast, conflict and attraction ===
Jia Tolentino wrote in The New Yorker that the "amoral" Villanelle's existence is "saturated with pleasure", in contrast to Eve's career as a "bored security-state functionary". Series writer Phoebe Waller-Bridge explained that Polastri has a "sense of self-consciousness and guilt" that cripples her – a perfect counterpoint to Villanelle, who, as Ashley Boucher noted in TheWrap, only does things that might bring joy.

Hanh Nguyen wrote in IndieWire that, even when Villanelle invades her home Eve "can't quite capture who Villanelle is as a person" since the assassin always seems to be a few steps ahead, and that Polastri, possessed of a "frustrating attraction", "keeps banging her head on the enigmatic wall that is Villanelle". Melanie McFarland wrote in Salon that, though Villanelle has the opportunity to kill Polastri during the break-in, forces within Villanelle – despite having been "raised to kill without guilt or concern" – compel her to want Polastri alive.

Angelica Jade Bastién wrote in Vulture that, after Villanelle manipulates Polastri into committing a brutal murder, the women are "finally stripped of their proxies, and the electric tension between them is laid bare". Sandra Oh described Polastri's ultimately misguided belief that she is "special" enough to control Villanelle, that they have a "special" connection, but — upon telling Villanelle that Villanelle doesn't know what love is — learns otherwise: Villanelle shoots her, a counterpoint to Eve having stabbed Villanelle earlier. Villanelle had later reflected on Polastri's having stabbed her, "Sometimes when you love someone, you will do crazy things".

=== Social, thematic and creative context ===
Both the protagonist and antagonist of Killing Eve are women. Matt Zoller Seitz in Vulture wrote that this is an "immediately distinguishing difference" between the show and other stories in the "cat-and-mouse thriller" genre, "where both the main investigator and the main baddie tend to be men". Willa Paskin in Slate made a similar remark, referring to both leads being women as "an unexpected setup for a murder show".

BBC America president Sarah Barnett commented that "there is a marvelous sea change happening where we are profoundly shifting away from an invisible, unconscious assumption that the big stories have men at the center, and anything else is a subset of that". Seitz also noted that, even in contrast to films such as The Silence of the Lambs and Hannibal in which one lead character is female, the conflict between Polastri and Villanelle is more equal despite the fact one entered as "an MI5 paper-pusher" and the other as an experienced assassin. Along similar lines, Melanie McFarland wrote in Salon that most feminist narratives are framed in terms of a male-female dynamic, but Polastri and Villanelle explore "patriarchy's impact on the already delicate complexities of female relationships": though sisterhood is powerful, "it's also complicated and devoid of guarantees" and "can be false and a trap".

Ben Goldberg wrote in Into that the relationship between Polastri and Villanelle — "often sexual, at times romantic, and occasionally vengeful" — "resists simple categorization". Their mutual affectation suggests an alternative lifestyle, the couple performing an "elaborate dance, edging closer to one other while always being just slightly out of reach". The characters’ mutual interest is "rooted in a desire of an unknown — a life away from the men that presently structure their lives".

=== Relationships and sexuality ===
Showrunner-writer Phoebe Waller-Bridge remarked that the characters "give each other life in a way that's more complex than a romantic relationship. It's sexual, it's intellectual, it's aspirational." Along these lines, Melanie McFarland wrote in Salon that the show's "careful awareness of the love languages of fashion, music and setting all play roles in strengthening (the audience's) affair" with the characters. Hannah Giorgis wrote in The Atlantic that its "greatest success" is how alluring it makes Villanelle to an intelligence agent dedicated to tracking her down. Calling Killing Eve a "sexually charged female-buddy-comedy espionage nailbiter", Jenna Scherer wrote in Rolling Stone that the actresses "share a crackling chemistry, one that situates them in a gray realm between bitter enemies and would-be lovers".

Shannon Liao noted in The Verge that "some say that demanding physical expressions of sexuality or other concrete confirmations of queer relationships... can erase subtler, more complex relationships", and that this pair's mutual obsession "ventures into homoerotic territory" without explicit physical consummation. Accordingly, the show has largely escaped criticisms of "age-old issues dealing with LGBTQ representation on-screen, like queerbaiting or male-fantasy lesbianism", with Liao concluding that "Killing Eve is one of the only shows pushing the envelope in the espionage genre on race, gender, and sexuality". Natalie Adler wrote in BuzzFeed News that the show is about "femme power, femme cruelty, femme treachery—an explicitly queer power, one that doesn't suffer cis men". Kate Arthur wrote in Buzzfeed News that this relationship "has never before existed between women on television: a queer will-they-or-won't-they romance in which one suitor is an admitted psychopath".

=== Portrayals ===
Jia Tolentino wrote in The New Yorker that the "women are deeply strange, forming a collective study in improbable contrasts, strung together by each actor's charisma". Matt Zoller Seitz wrote in Vulture that Oh's performance as Polastri actually makes Villanelle's character feel more plausible – as "an incarnation of Eve's sublimated aggression and assertiveness". Though Jia Tolentino wrote in The New Yorker that Villanelle's character "works" because of Comer's "mercurial, unassailable charisma", and Willa Paskin wrote in Slate that Comer's Villanelle (twisted and conscienceless but also irrepressible) is "flat-out incredible" and Mike Hale agreed in The New York Times that Comer is good in that "showier part". Hale added that it is Ms. Oh who ensures the series is "more than a cute gloss on the glamorous international caper."

=== Fashion ===
A pink tulle dress worn in the first-series episode "I'll Deal with Him Later", designed by Molly Goddard, was heralded as a "fashion moment" that inspired the dresses worn on red carpets in the subsequent awards season, including an overwhelming showing of pink at the 91st Academy Awards ceremony in 2019.

The show has had three costume designers: Phoebe de Gaye for the first series, Charlotte Mitchell for the second, and Sam Perry for the third.

==== Villanelle ====
The character Villanelle's relationship to fashion has been described by many people. Gilly Ferguson of Grazia says that she has become a "style icon". Luke Jennings, author of the book series on which the show is based, says that "Clothes reflect her status and independence[...] She doesn't have to conform or please anyone's gaze"; Charlotte Mitchell agrees that "She plays by her own rules". Sonia Saraiya of Vanity Fair considers Villanelle's outfits "their own subplot"; she notes that the character choosing to live in Paris is also a nod to the emphasis on fashion in the show. Melania Hidalgo of The Cut writes that "Villanelle reverses the style of a typical femme fatale, wearing everyday basics on her missions while saving the choicest items in her wardrobe for her days off"; in reference to a specific outfit, Steff Yotka of Vogue says that Villanelle has "redefined the look of an international assassin story" by subverting classic tactical gear and sleekness. Mitchell also said of Villanelle that she "uses color to provoke reactions", pointing to the pink Molly Goddard dress.

==== Eve Polastri ====
Considered Villanelle's fashion foil by Entertainment Weekly, Eve Polastri has been described as considering fashion "trivial" and not bothering to dress well. Jennings suggested that even if she cared, "she'd be hopeless at it"; Mitchell and de Gaye crafted outfits that match Eve's practical attitude, with Mitchell saying that she "wears elastic waists [because] she doesn't have time to do up a button fly". Other choices include more clothes made of linen to more easily appear dishevelled. Eve is allowed some moments of being well-dressed, however, which are significant to the plot, including trying on dresses that Villanelle has chosen for her in her own stolen suitcase.

== Reception ==
=== Critical response ===
Critical response to Killing Eve
Season	Rotten Tomatoes	Metacritic
1	96% (155 reviews)	83 (22 reviews)
2	92% (164 reviews)	86 (22 reviews)
3	80% (159 reviews)	63 (16 reviews)
4	53% (94 reviews)	55 (14 reviews)

==== Season 1 ====
On Rotten Tomatoes, the first season has an approval rating of 96% based on 155 reviews, with an average rating of 8.3/10. The website's critical consensus reads, "Seductive and surprising, Killing Eve's twist on the spy vs. spy concept rewards viewers with an audaciously entertaining show that finally makes good use of Sandra Oh's talents." On Metacritic, it has a weighted average score of 83 out of 100 based on 22 critics, indicating "universal acclaim".

Jenna Scherer, writing in Rolling Stone, described Killing Eve as "hilarious, bloody, unclassifiable" and idiosyncratic, "a stylish story of obsession and psychopathy that's disarmingly warm and lived-in". Scherer went on to write that the show "undermines every rule of TV", with what it does best being its "dry wit, razor-wire tension, sex appeal and the looming threat of violence". Hanh Nguyen wrote on IndieWire that one of the show's most appealing aspects is "how it subverts expectation", allowing it to "constantly surprise and delight". Troy Patterson wrote in The New Yorker that the story discloses "a life independent of genre conventions" and that the triumph of the show's style is its "reconciliation of the outlandish and the intimate", adding that the "Jason Bourne-style escapism of the bare premise, inflected by the assertively odd tone, yields fresh depictions of fear and grief". In the context of Vulture's selection of Sandra Oh as the best actress on television (June 2018), Matt Zoller Seitz wrote that there was "no precedent" for the "wild extremes" of the show's "comedy and thriller elements". While Mike Hale acknowledged in The New York Times that "scenes and characterizations play out differently than we're used to" and the comic style is distinctive, he also wrote – in contrast to most reviewers – of being "just as conscious of (the show's) congruences with standard examples of the genre ... as ... of the differences", citing Berlin Station, La Femme Nikita, Covert Affairs and Homeland.

Scherer described the show as a feminine take on a traditionally masculine genre—"more interested in giving space to character beats and the weird chaos that can leak into the best-laid plans". Similarly, Melanie McFarland wrote for Salon that Killing Eve has been dubbed a "feminist thriller", calling it a "perfect show for the #MeToo era", saying that it "slakes one's desire to see piggish misogynists get what's coming to them" but also delves into complex trust issues among women and shows "sisterhood's might and peril (as) powerful ... but ... also complicated and devoid of guarantees". Along the same lines, Willa Paskin wrote in Slate that Killing Eve is a story about "the literal dangers of underestimating women: of not seeing the woman who can kill you, underestimating the woman who can stop her". Paskin added that "The disfigured, beating heart of Killing Eve is the way that Villanelle's gender and manner, her very femininity, keep our acculturated brains from being appropriately terrified of her".

Jia Tolentino acknowledged in The New Yorker how critics have noted that women characters are substituted for men "in every meaningful part", that the men are "formulaic" but the women are "deeply strange". However, Tolentino asserted that Killing Eve "isn't shaped around the concept of women; it's shaped around these women, who are unlike any others in their wild, unlikely interior weirdness and flux". She added that a defining feature of the show is its "constant reversals in tone and rhythm", with the show's thrill coming "from pattern rather than resolution".

Ben Goldberg wrote in Into that the series "never outright explains its characters' sexualities, but unlike shows that queerbait their audiences, Killing Eve does not need to name the relationship between Eve and Villanelle in order to recognize it", adding that the show "does not shy away from its characters' sexual attraction but also complicates this narrative at every turn".

Hannah Giorgis wrote in The Atlantic that the show's greatest success is "how alluring it makes its villain: to both Eve ... and audiences", and that Villanelle's character subverts feminine stereotypes so as to "carve a jagged space into the serial-killer canon".

==== Season 2 ====
On Rotten Tomatoes, the second season has an approval rating of 92% based on 164 reviews, with an average rating of 8.15/10. The website's critical consensus reads, "With the titillating cat-and-mouse game still rooted at its core, Killing Eve returns for an enthralling second season of considerably higher stakes, hilariously dark humor and a captivating dynamic between characters, solidifying its position as one of the best spy thrillers out." On Metacritic, it has a weighted average score of 86 out of 100 based on 22 critics, indicating "universal acclaim".

Chitra Ramaswamy wrote in The Guardian that the show "uproots the tired old sexist tropes of spy thrillers then repots them as feminist in-jokes, patriarchal piss-takes, tasteless murders and blooms of sapphic chemistry". Describing how Villanelle "does what she always does—exploit society's misogyny by imitating a victim of it"—Emily Nussbaum wrote in The New Yorker that the potent idea that undergirds the show is that "femininity is itself a sort of sociopathy, whose performance, if you truly nail it, might be the source of ultimate power".

Angelica Jade Bastién wrote in Vulture that the second season, with new showrunner Emerald Fennell, "trades in the precise mordant wit of series creator Phoebe Waller-Bridge for something more garish and horrifying", further describing the "wild consumption" of food and clothing "that builds into the closest thing the show has come to a genuine sex scene between" the two women. Bastién also perceived that "Killing Eve is deeply indebted to film noir, a genre whose backbone is the ways people lose their soul in the face of desire—...but it's a noir operating at the tenor of a fairy tale".

==== Season 3 ====
On Rotten Tomatoes, the third season has an approval rating of 80% based on 159 reviews, with an average rating of 6.75/10. The website's critical consensus reads, "If Killing Eve's third season doesn't cut quite as deep, it's still a fiendishly delightful showcase for Jodie Comer and Sandra Oh's killer chemistry." On Metacritic, it has a weighted average score of 63 out of 100 based on 16 critics, indicating "generally favourable reviews".

==== Season 4 ====
On Rotten Tomatoes, the fourth season has an approval rating of 53% based on 94 reviews, with an average rating of 6.3/10. The website's critical consensus reads, "Villanelle's found religion in Killing Eve's climactic season, but this series has spun its wheels for so long that the thrill is gone." On Metacritic, it has a weighted average score of 55 out of 100 based on 14 critics, indicating "mixed or average reviews".

The series's ending received a backlash from its fanbase and critics, who called it unsatisfying and cruel. The finale was accused of perpetuating the Bury Your Gays trope; killing a queer main character moments after she achieved happiness, with no real contextual reason for the death. The episode was quickly added to 'worst TV finale' lists. Jennings, in an article for The Guardian, consoled upset fans, deeming the ending 'a bowing to convention'. Other accusations of homophobia, present throughout the season, included the religious-themed redemption arc for Villanelle, as well as the overall treatment of the relationship between Eve and Villanelle. A series of comments made by Sally Woodward Gentle and showrunner Laura Neal in post-season interviews had referred to the controversial death scene as a sort of "rebirth" for the surviving main character, allowing her to return to a "normal life".

Comer and Oh defended the ending with Comer saying the death of Villanelle was "inevitable". Oh said, "Villanelle had to die to bring the show to an end point. Honestly at the beginning of 2020 when discussing the finale it was the other way around, but through the pandemic we changed tracks. Villanelle goes onto more ethereal realms. And Eve is left to survive." Originally Eve was going to die instead of Villanelle. Oh said she had suggested Eve should die and told series writer Laura Neal that the demise of her character "would be the strongest and the most interesting" conclusion. She was eventually told, "We can't do it. We need to change it… Eve needs to live." Comer and Oh did not believe a happy ending was possible for their characters. In 2019 when asked about Eve and Villanelle having a happy ending Oh said, "I think the idea of living happily ever after and running away with each other, I think the happily is the only problem along with living."

Prior to filming, and during the George Floyd protests and the resulting re-examining of race relations worldwide, series four generated an earlier backlash when Kayleigh Llewellyn tweeted a screenshot of a Zoom call with the other writers. This led to criticism of the lack of diversity in the writer's room, given one of the programme's leads, Eve Polastri, is an Asian woman. Woodward Gentle later responded, stating, "You look at that room and it's full of brilliant female writers, we've got a really strong LGBTQ contingent, but it's not good enough and we need to do better."

==== "Best of" lists ====
Review aggregator Metacritic reported in early December 2018 that more individual television critics included Killing Eve in their 2018 year-end Top Ten lists than any other show.

In November 2018, Killing Eve was chosen as Time magazine's Best Show of 2018, the magazine's Judy Berman writing that "the characters were multidimensional but incomplete, their mutual obsession fueled by the sense that each woman had something crucial the other lacked". It was number three on The New York Post's Decider.com "Best TV Shows of 2018" list, being praised for "brilliant writing" and "nuanced performances". It was also second on the "25 Best TV Shows of 2018" list from Paste magazine, which labelled it as "the best new series of the year".

In December 2018, The Guardian named Killing Eve the best TV show of 2018, describing it as a "high-wire act of misdirection that subverted stale genre expectations" and saying that it "mix[es] genres – spy thriller, comedy, action film, workplace drama and... farce – without it collapsing into a tonal mess". The New York Times included Killing Eve in its "Best TV Shows of 2018" list, stating that the series was "infused ... with the brio of a dark comedy, though its hour length marked it as crime drama". The New York Times also included Oh's and Comer's performances in its list of "Best Performances of 2018", noting "these two women are inventive about how to be funny in a thriller" and "make run-of-the mill embarrassment seem more lethal than any bullet". NPR included the show on its list of "Favorite TV Shows of 2018", saying that it may be "the strangest—and most compelling—story of how opposites attract on TV this year".

The Washington Post listed Killing Eve as the third best show of 2018, calling the "sleeper hit... splendidly paced". USA Today listed the show at fifth place on its "Best TV Shows of 2018" list, remarking that it "completely surprises you, from its writing to its performances to its direction to the names on the poster". New York magazine's pop culture website Vulture included the series as number seven on Jen Chaney's "10 Best TV Shows of 2018" list, remarking on its immediate and escalating "sense of propulsive daring" and its infusion of "feminine energy". TV Guide named Oh's and Comer's performances as the second best TV performance of 2018, and said that the show "ended up on pretty much everyone's Best of 2018 lists". Vanity Fair listed the show at second place on its "Best TV Shows of 2018" list, saying that "watching Killing Eve is like spraying a disinfectant for the musty tropes of prestige drama directly onto your brain" and inviting viewers to "come for the black comedy; stay for the fashion".

Rolling Stone named the show as the fourth best TV show of 2018, describing it as "exciting and scary while making room for the quippy dialogue and smart observations about how women interact". IndieWire listed Killing Eve as the fourth best new TV show of 2018, saying that "exploring identity and dark desires, the series never met an impulse it didn't pursue to its extreme", and that "outrageous and often off-kilter dark humor only highlights the show's transgressive charms". Livingly Media listed the series as the third best TV show of 2018, saying it is "loaded with quippy dialogue and razor-sharp observations about how women interact in increasingly destructive environments". Mashable rated the show number four on its "Best New TV Shows of 2018" list, praising the two lead actors and commenting that the show was "exactly the weird, psychosexual romp (that) 2018 needed".

In September 2019, The Guardian ranked Killing Eve 30th on its list of the 100 best TV shows of the 21st century, stating that "few shows in TV history have scythed on to the screen with as much elan". In December 2019, The New York Times named the show as 9th on its Best International TV Shows of the Decade, characterising it as "a riff on the romantic spy thriller that can be darkly funny one moment and devastating the next".

=== Ratings ===
The first series had unbroken weekly ratings growth among adults aged 25–54 and 18–49, which no other television show had accomplished in more than a decade. The final episode's 1.25 million viewers (Nielsen live+3) was 86 per cent greater than for the premiere. The second series was simulcast on both AMC and BBC America, with its premiere drawing a combined total of 1.17 million viewers.

When the first episode of the second series was shown on BBC One it had 3.5 million viewers taking a 21% audience share.

Killing Eve : U.S. viewers per episode (thousands)

Season	Episode number								Average
Season	1	2	3	4	5	6	7	8	Average
1	423	371	388	503	518	537	485	701	491
2	403	321	361	459	454	402	419	367	398
3	443	342	334	380	419	340	357	393	376
4	435	341	300	337	194	273	354	354	324

Audience measurement performed by Nielsen Media Research

== Accolades ==
Award nominations for Killing Eve
Award	Year	Category	Nominee(s)	Result	Ref.
American Cinema Editors Awards	2019	Best Edited Drama Series for Commercial Television	Gary Dollner	Won	
American Cinema Editors Awards	2021	Best Edited Drama Series for Commercial Television	Dan Crinnion (for "Still Got It")	Nominated	
American Society of Cinematographers Awards	2021	Outstanding Achievement in Cinematography in an Episode of a One-Hour Television Series – Commercial	Carlos Catalán (for "Meetings Have Biscuits")	Nominated	
Art Directors Guild Awards	2021	Excellence in Production Design for a One-Hour Contemporary Single-Camera Series	Laurence Dorman (for "Are You from Pinner?")	Nominated	
British Academy Television Awards	2019	Best Drama Series	Killing Eve	Won	
British Academy Television Awards	2019	Best Leading Actress	Jodie Comer	Won	
British Academy Television Awards	2019	Best Leading Actress	Sandra Oh	Nominated	
British Academy Television Awards	2019	Best Supporting Actor	Kim Bodnia	Nominated	
British Academy Television Awards	2019	Best Supporting Actress	Fiona Shaw	Won	
British Academy Television Awards	2019	Must-See TV Moment	Eve stabs Villanelle	Nominated	
British Academy Television Awards	2020	Best Leading Actress	Jodie Comer	Nominated	
British Academy Television Awards	2021	Best Leading Actress	Jodie Comer	Nominated	
British Academy Television Craft Awards	2019	Best Writer: Drama	Phoebe Waller-Bridge	Nominated	
British Academy Television Craft Awards	2019	Best Costume Design	Phoebe de Gaye	Nominated	
British Academy Television Craft Awards	2019	Best Director: Fiction	Harry Bradbeer (episode 1)	Nominated	
British Academy Television Craft Awards	2019	Best Editing: Fiction	Garry Dollner (episode 1)	Nominated	
British Academy Television Craft Awards	2019	Best Original Music	David Holmes, Keefus Ciancia	Won	
British Academy Television Craft Awards	2019	Best Photography and Lighting: Fiction	Julian Court (episode 7)	Nominated	
British Academy Television Craft Awards	2019	Best Production Design	Kristian Milsted	Nominated	
British Academy Television Craft Awards	2019	Best Sound: Fiction	Sound team	Won	
British Academy Television Craft Awards	2019	Best Titles and Graphic Identity	Matt Willey	Nominated	
British Academy Television Craft Awards	2020	Best Editing: Fiction	Dan Crinnion (for "Episode 4")	Nominated	
British Academy Television Craft Awards	2020	Best Original Music	David Holmes and Keefus Ciancia	Nominated	
British Academy Television Craft Awards	2020	Best Production Design	Laurence Dorman and Linda Wilson	Nominated	
British Society of Cinematographers Awards	2018	Best Cinematography in a Television Drama	Julian Court (for "I Don't Want to Be Free")	Nominated	
Costume Designers Guild Awards	2020	Excellence in Contemporary Television	Charlotte Mitchell (for "Desperate Times")	Nominated	
Critics' Choice Television Awards	2019	Best Actress in a Drama Series	Jodie Comer	Nominated	
Critics' Choice Television Awards	2019	Best Actress in a Drama Series	Sandra Oh	Won	
Critics' Choice Television Awards	2019	Best Drama Series	Killing Eve	Nominated	
Critics' Choice Television Awards	2020	Best Actress in a Drama Series	Jodie Comer	Nominated	
GLAAD Media Awards	2020	Outstanding Drama Series	Killing Eve	Nominated	
GLAAD Media Awards	2021	Outstanding Drama Series	Killing Eve	Nominated	
Golden Globe Awards	2019	Best Actress – Television Series Drama	Sandra Oh	Won	
Golden Globe Awards	2019	Best Television Series – Drama	Killing Eve	Nominated	
Golden Globe Awards	2020	Best Actress – Television Series Drama	Jodie Comer	Nominated	
Golden Globe Awards	2020	Best Television Series – Drama	Killing Eve	Nominated	
Golden Globe Awards	2021	Best Actress – Television Series Drama	Jodie Comer	Nominated	
Gotham Awards	2018	Breakthrough Series – Long Form	Killing Eve	Won	
Gracie Awards	2019	Actress in a Leading Role – Drama	Sandra Oh	Won	
Gracie Awards	2019	Drama	Killing Eve	Won	
Hollywood Critics Association TV Awards	2022	Best Actress in a Broadcast Network or Cable Series, Drama	Jodie Comer	Nominated	
Hollywood Critics Association TV Awards	2022	Best Actress in a Broadcast Network or Cable Series, Drama	Sandra Oh	Nominated	
Location Managers Guild Awards	2019	Outstanding Locations in Contemporary Television	Casper Mills	Nominated	
Location Managers Guild Awards	2020	Outstanding Locations in Contemporary Television	Jamie Parsons, Jordi Utset, Lucian Asan	Won	
Make-Up Artists and Hair Stylists Guild Awards	2021	Best Contemporary Make-Up	Juliette Tomes and Amy Brand (series 3)	Nominated	
MTV Movie & TV Awards	2021	Best Kiss	Jodie Comer and Sandra Oh	Nominated	
National Television Awards	2019	Best New Drama Series	Killing Eve	Nominated	
National Television Awards	2019	Outstanding Drama Performance	Jodie Comer	Nominated	
Peabody Awards	2019	Entertainment	Killing Eve	Won	
People's Choice Awards	2018	The Bingeworthy Show of 2018	Killing Eve	Nominated	
Primetime Emmy Awards	2018	Outstanding Lead Actress in a Drama Series	Sandra Oh (for "I Have a Thing About Bathrooms")	Nominated	
Primetime Emmy Awards	2018	Outstanding Writing for a Drama Series	Phoebe Waller-Bridge (for "Nice Face")	Nominated	
Primetime Emmy Awards	2019	Outstanding Directing for a Drama Series	Lisa Brühlmann (for "Desperate Times")	Nominated	
Primetime Emmy Awards	2019	Outstanding Drama Series	Sally Woodward Gentle, Lee Morris, Phoebe Waller-Bridge, Emerald Fennell, Gina Mingacci, Damon Thomas, Francesca Gardiner, Sandra Oh, Elinor Day, Morenike Williams and Andy Noble	Nominated	
Primetime Emmy Awards	2019	Outstanding Lead Actress in a Drama Series	Jodie Comer (for "I Hope You Like Missionary!")	Won	
Primetime Emmy Awards	2019	Outstanding Lead Actress in a Drama Series	Sandra Oh (for "You're Mine")	Nominated	
Primetime Emmy Awards	2019	Outstanding Supporting Actress in a Drama Series	Fiona Shaw (for "Nice and Neat")	Nominated	
Primetime Emmy Awards	2019	Outstanding Writing for a Drama Series	Emerald Fennell (for "Nice and Neat")	Nominated	
Primetime Emmy Awards	2020	Outstanding Drama Series	Sally Woodward Gentle, Lee Morris, Phoebe Waller-Bridge, Gina Mingacci, Sandra Oh, Damon Thomas, Suzanne Heathcote, Jeff Melvoin, Lynn Horsford and Nige Watson	Nominated	
Primetime Emmy Awards	2020	Outstanding Lead Actress in a Drama Series	Jodie Comer (for "Are You From Pinner?")	Nominated	
Primetime Emmy Awards	2020	Outstanding Lead Actress in a Drama Series	Sandra Oh (for "Are You Leading or Am I?")	Nominated	
Primetime Emmy Awards	2020	Outstanding Supporting Actress in a Drama Series	Fiona Shaw (for "Management Sucks")	Nominated	
Primetime Emmy Awards	2022	Outstanding Lead Actress in a Drama Series	Jodie Comer (for "Don't Get Eaten")	Nominated	
Primetime Emmy Awards	2022	Outstanding Lead Actress in a Drama Series	Sandra Oh (for "Making Dead Things Look Nice")	Nominated	
Primetime Creative Arts Emmy Awards	2019	Outstanding Casting for a Drama Series	Suzanne Crowley and Gilly Poole	Nominated	
Primetime Creative Arts Emmy Awards	2019	Outstanding Production Design for a Narrative Contemporary Program (One Hour or More)	Laurence Dorman, Beckie Harvey and Linda Wilson (for "The Hungry Caterpillar")	Nominated	
Primetime Creative Arts Emmy Awards	2019	Outstanding Single-Camera Picture Editing for a Drama Series	Dan Crinnion (for "Desperate Times")	Nominated	
Primetime Creative Arts Emmy Awards	2020	Outstanding Casting for a Drama Series	Suzanne Crowley and Gilly Poole	Nominated	
Primetime Creative Arts Emmy Awards	2020	Outstanding Contemporary Costumes	Katie Broome, Sam Perry and Justin Selway (for "Are You from Pinner?")	Nominated	
Primetime Creative Arts Emmy Awards	2020	Outstanding Music Supervision	Catherine Grieves and David Holmes ("Meetings Have Biscuits")	Nominated	
Primetime Creative Arts Emmy Awards	2020	Outstanding Production Design for a Narrative Contemporary Program (One Hour or More)	Laurence Dorman, Beckie Harvey and Casey Williams (for "Are You From Pinner?")	Nominated	
Royal Television Society Awards	2019	Drama Series	Killing Eve	Nominated	
Royal Television Society Awards	2019	Actor: Female	Jodie Comer	Won	
Royal Television Society Awards	2019	Actor: Female	Sandra Oh	Nominated	
Royal Television Society Craft & Design Awards	2019	Design - Titles	Matt Willey	Won	
Royal Television Society Craft & Design Awards	2019	Editing - Drama	Gary Dollner	Nominated	
Royal Television Society Craft & Design Awards	2019	Production Design - Drama	Kristian Milsted	Nominated	
Satellite Awards	2019	Best Actress in a Drama / Genre Series	Sandra Oh	Nominated	
Satellite Awards	2020	Best Television Series – Drama	Killing Eve	Nominated	
Satellite Awards	2020	Best Actress in a Drama / Genre Series	Jodie Comer	Nominated	
Satellite Awards	2020	Best Actress in a Drama / Genre Series	Sandra Oh	Nominated	
Satellite Awards	2021	Best Television Series – Drama	Killing Eve	Nominated	
Satellite Awards	2021	Best Actress in a Drama / Genre Series	Sandra Oh	Nominated	
Saturn Awards	2019	Best Action-Thriller Television Series	Killing Eve	Nominated	
Saturn Awards	2019	Best Actress in a Television Series	Sandra Oh	Nominated	
Screen Actors Guild Awards	2019	Outstanding Performance by a Female Actor in a Drama Series	Sandra Oh	Won	
Screen Actors Guild Awards	2020	Outstanding Performance by a Female Actor in a Drama Series	Jodie Comer	Nominated	
Television Critics Association Awards	2018	Individual Achievement in Drama	Jodie Comer	Nominated	
Television Critics Association Awards	2018	Individual Achievement in Drama	Sandra Oh	Nominated	
Television Critics Association Awards	2018	Outstanding Achievement in Drama	Killing Eve	Nominated	
Television Critics Association Awards	2018	Outstanding New Program	Killing Eve	Won	
Television Critics Association Awards	2018	Program of the Year	Killing Eve	Nominated	
Television Critics Association Awards	2019	Individual Achievement in Drama	Jodie Comer	Nominated	
Television Critics Association Awards	2019	Outstanding Achievement in Drama	Killing Eve	Nominated	

== Spin-off ==
In March 2021, Sid Gentle Films confirmed that Killing Eve would conclude with its fourth series. Additionally, the development of a potential, unnamed, spin-off series was being considered.

In April 2022, it was confirmed that a spin-off focusing on Carolyn Martens's early life at MI6 was in the early stages of development.

In March 2025, the series named Honey was ordered by BBC and ZDF. In April, it was reported that the show serves as a prequel of Killing Eve featuring the character Carolyn Martens, however the broadcasters declined to comment on a connection between the two series. It premiered on BBC One and BBC iPlayer on 14 November 2026.
