= Janell Shirtcliff =

American filmmaker, photographer, and music video director

- Born: October 18, 1983 (age 42) (Note: On October 18, 2014, Shirtcliff posted "Happy 31st birthday to me!" on her Instagram.); Corpus Christi, Texas
- Occupations: Filmmaker; photographer; music video director; model; actor
- Notable work: Habit
- Website: janellshirtcliff.com

Janell Shirtcliff (born October 18, 1983) is an American filmmaker, photographer, and music video director. She also worked as a model for a decade, and as an actor for which she has been praised. She made her film directorial debut with 2021's Habit. Her photography has been featured in publications including Variety, Billboard, Nylon, and Teen Vogue.

== Career ==
=== Music videos ===
Shirtcliff has directed music videos for songs including The Band Perry's "The Good Life", Bethany Cosentino's "It's Fine", Tashaki Miyaki's "Anyone But You", and Mayer Hawthorne's "Over".

=== Photography ===
Shirtcliff first got into photography when she started shooting images for her online store Lonelydot, through which she sells vintage clothes. She photographed Phoebe Bridgers for a cover story in Variety in 2021.

=== Film ===
Shirtcliff made her feature directorial debut with the 2021 film Habit, which she also cowrote with her childhood best friend Libby Mintz. The film is set in Los Angeles and stars Bella Thorne as a party girl from Corpus Christi and Paris Jackson as Jesus. The film was negatively received, accruing a 6% score on Rotten Tomatoes from 16 critics, including The Guardian's Leslie Felperin who called the film a "John Waters wannabe". The film also generated controversy, including a petition to block the film's release with nearly 300,000 signatures claiming that the film was Christianophobic because Jackson's Jesus was portrayed as a lesbian, though the film's promotional materials and logline did not indicate the claim was true. A second petition started by One Million Moms gained over 70,000 signatures, calling the film "sacrilegious". Gavin Rossdale, who plays a drug dealer named Eric in the film, praised Shirtcliff and said they built a great rapport with each other.

Shirtcliff directed the documentary film Mother of the Dawn, about Vale do Amanhecer founder Tia Neiva. She first discovered Neiva from a photo while browsing online, and was inspired by the image. She pitched the idea of the documentary to producer Tommy Savas, and it was written by Angie Simms. Mother of the Dawn premiered at the Rollins Theatre in Austin, Texas, as part of the 2022 South by Southwest festival's Documentary Shorts Competition.

In December 2023, the fantasy horror film Triton was announced, with Shirtcliff set to direct. The cast includes Freya Allan, Josh Whitehouse, Elsie Hewitt, Raff Law, Malcolm McRae, and Thalia Besson. Shirtcliff cowrote the film with Simms, and shot it in Athens, Greece.

As of 2021, Shirtcliff was set to direct another film called The Edge of Nowhere, also featuring Rossdale.

=== Other work ===
Prior to her photography career, Shirtcliff worked as a model for ten years, posing for companies including Levi's and Urban Outfitters.

Shirtcliff appeared as an actor in the music video for Katy Perry's 2013 single "Unconditionally", directed by Aya Tanimura. She also acted in the film Dirty Old Town alongside Billy Leroy, for which Variety's Andrew Barker said hers was the standout performance.

== Personal life ==
Shirtcliff lives in Corpus Christi, Texas, having lived in the Texas Coastal Bend region since moving from California at age 12. She has two children, one of whom is a son named Bowie. Shirtcliff was previously engaged to Youngblood Hawke singer Sam Martin. She was in a relationship with actor Eric Dane at the time of his death in 2026.
