= Triton (film) =

Fantasy horror film

- Directed by: Janell Shirtcliff
- Screenplay by: Angie Simms
- Story by: Janell Shirtcliff
- Produced by: Brad Feinstein; Brian Kavanagh-Jones; Adonis Tountas
- Starring: Freya Allan; Raff Law; Josh Whitehouse
- Production companies: Range; Romulus Entertainment; Everlast Pictures
- Country: United States
- Language: English

Triton is an upcoming American fantasy horror film directed by Janell Shirtcliff and written by Angie Simms. It is based on a story by Shirtcliff and Simms. It stars Freya Allan, Raff Law and Josh Whitehouse.

== Cast ==
- Freya Allan
- Raff Law
- Josh Whitehouse
- Elsie Hewitt
- Thalia Besson
- Malcolm McRae

== Production ==
The film is directed by Janell Shirtcliff and written by Angie Simms, and based on a story by Shirtcliff and Simms. Brad Feinstein at Romulus Entertainment is producing and financing the film. Brian Kavanaugh-Jones and Range are producing alongside Adonis Tountas and Everlast Pictures.

Announced in the lead cast in December 2023 were Freya Allan, Raff Law and Josh Whitehouse. Principal photography took place in Athens, Greece in late 2023. According to an interview with Raff Law in Evening Standard he had finished filming in Greece by February 2024.
