= Edward Akrout =

Franco-British artist and actor

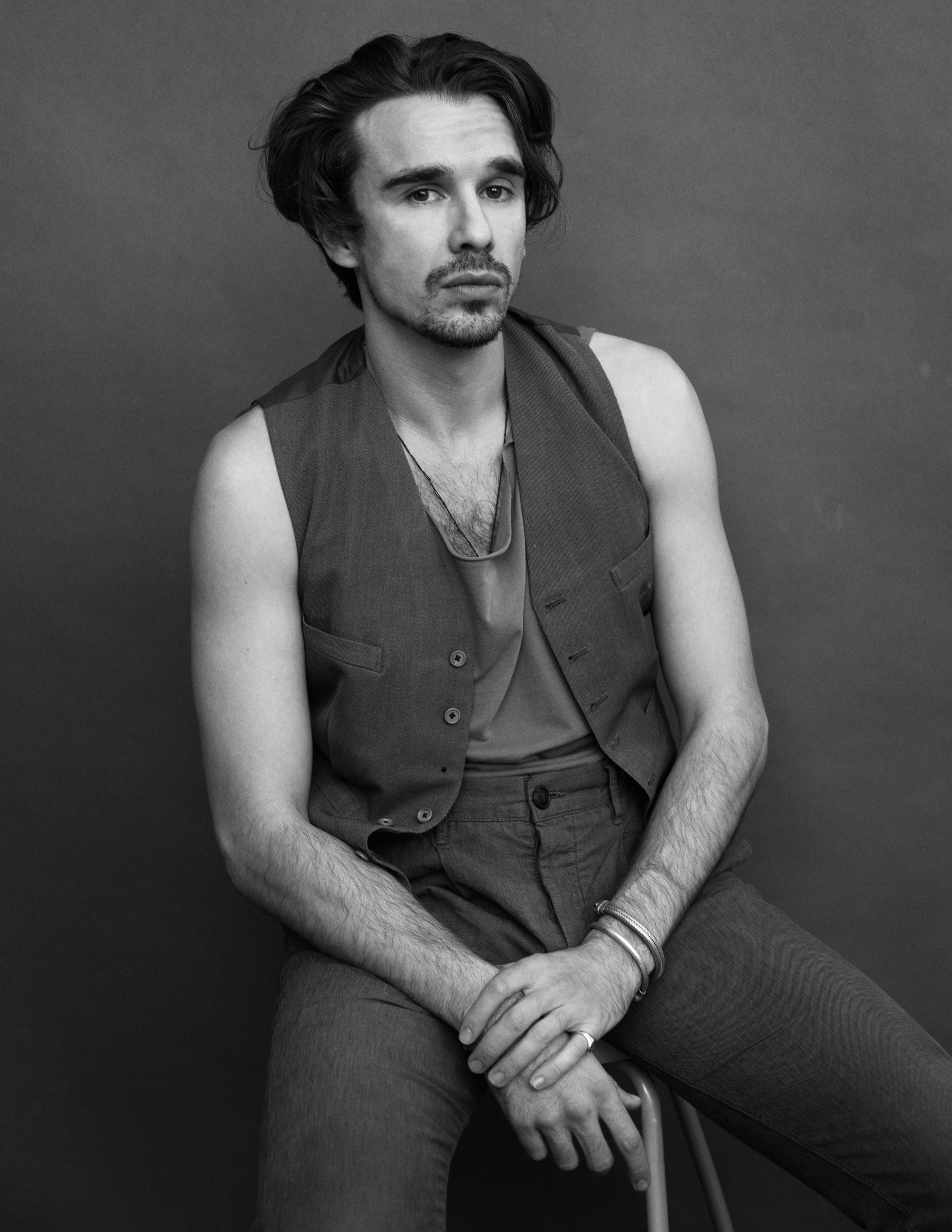
- Photographed by Patrik Andersson
- Born: Paris, France
- Education: London Academy of Music and Dramatic Art (LAMDA); Sorbonne University
- Occupations: Actor, artist
- Years active: 2009–present
- Spouse: Shelby Wilder
- Website: www.edwardakrout.com

Edward Akrout is a Franco-British artist and actor.

== Early life ==
Born in Paris, Akrout grew up between France and England. He studied philosophy at the Sorbonne before attending Le Cours Florent in Paris for theatre, followed by time at the National Institute in Bucharest. He lives between London, New York and Paris.

Akrout moved to England where he studied acting at the London Academy of Music and Dramatic Art (LAMDA). Since graduating in 2008, Akrout has been prominent on both the screen and the stage.

He is the grandson of Air Commodore Anthony Norman Davis (1918–1988) a British Royal Air Force officer who was a pilot during the Second World War.

== Career ==
Akrout is best known for his role as The Dauphin in The Hollow Crown. Other notable roles include Yves D'Allegre in The Borgias, Laurent Debienne in Genius: Picasso, Diego in Killing Eve and Edward Steichen in Rodin directed by Jacques Doillon.

== Personal life ==
Akrout has been married to journalist Shelby Wilder since 2015. The couple divorced in 2025.

== Filmography ==
=== Film ===
Year	Title	Role	Notes	Ref.
2004	Ce soir-là	Elliott	Short film	
2007	The Avian Devil	Older Sebastian Mack	Short film	
2010	Critical Eye	Male French Lover	Short film	
2011	Swinging with the Finkels	Andrew		
2012	Full Firearms	Jerome		
2013	Dead in Tombstone	Snake	Direct-to-video	
2014	Deadly Virtues	Aaron		
2014	Reflections'	Ben	Short film	
2014	Guillaume le Conquérant	Fils Osbern	Television film	
2014	Sword of Vengeance	Lord Romain		
2015	Conga	Officer Delage	Short film	
2016	Love Is Thicker Than Water	Simon		
2017	Bitter Harvest	Professor Temchuck		
2017	Rodin	Edward Steichen		
2017	Trendy	Thomas Bellagarde		
2018	Get Christie Love	Niko Alloy	Television film	
2021	Alia's Birth	Tom		
2022	Sunflower	Paul Gauguin	Short film	
2025	Ambleside	Antoine		

=== Television ===
Year	Title	Role	Notes	Ref.
2009	Doctors	Louis Lyon	Episode: "Chef's Secret"	
2011–2012	The Borgias	French Captain	Recurring role; 5 episodes	
2012	The Hollow Crown	Louis, the Dauphin	Episode: "Henry V"	
2015	Father Brown	Gregoire Bisset	Episode: "The Truth in the Wine"	
2015	Mr Selfridge	Pierre Longchamp	Recurring role; 5 episodes	
2016	Midsomer Murders	Damien Lamerat	Episode: "Breaking the Chain"	
2016	Houdini & Doyle	Henry	Recurring role; 2 episodes	
2017	Gypsy	Zal	Episode: "Morgan Stop"	
2017	Turn: Washington's Spies	Amos Parker	Recurring role; 3 episodes	
2018	Killing Eve	Diego	Episode: "Sorry Baby"	
2018	Genius: Picasso	Laurent Debienne	Recurring role; 2 episodes	
2018	Strangers	Mateo	Recurring role; 2 episodes	
2018	Dark Heart	Paulo	Series regular; 5 episodes	
2019	The Enemy Within	Aslan Aksoy	Episode: "Confessions"	
2020	Blue Bloods	Samson James	Episode: "Hide in Plain Sight"	
2022	Bull	Henri Fray	Recurring role; 3 episodes	

== Art ==
His work has been included in group exhibitions at Metamatic: The Art Foundation (2016), Athens; The Gallery of African Art (2016), London; Le Carreau du Temple (2018), Paris; The Haus der Kulturen der Welt (2018), Berlin.

In 2017, Akrout created the art video Quantum Political Feedback in collaboration with artist, Jakob S. Boeskov. Quantum Political Feedback was in the official selection for Les Rencontres Internationales Paris/Berlin. The film debuted in Paris (12 April 2018) at Le Carreau du Temple in association with the Pompidou Centre, followed by opening at the festival in Berlin on 21 June 2018 at the venue HKW (Haus der Kulturen der Welt).

== See also ==
- List of British actors
- London Academy of Music and Dramatic Art
