= Ofr Librairie, Galerie =

Bookstore and gallery in the Marais of Paris

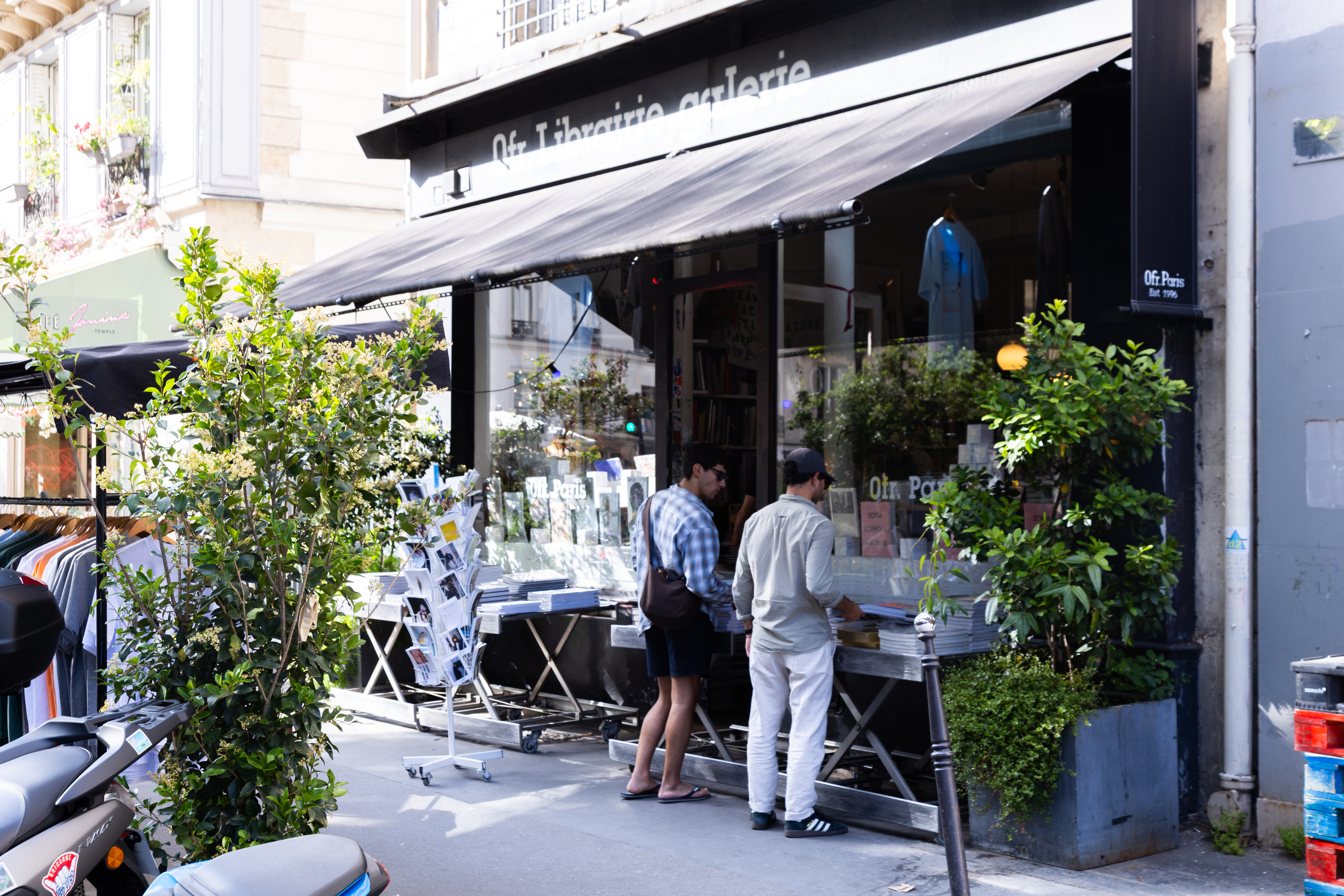
- Storefront in 2025
- Interactive map of the Ofr Librairie, Galerie area

General information
- Location: 20 Rue Dupetit-Thouars, 75003, Paris, France
- Coordinates: 48.86589346553215°N 2.3613444904206022°E
- Opened: 2007

Ofr Librairie, Galerie is an independent bookstore and gallery in the Marais in Paris, France. Its bookstore primarily sells art books, while its sixty-square-meter gallery behind it shows exhibitions and also hosts events. It additionally publishes its own books and produces films, as well as hosts a boutique shop at its second address.

One of the most famous bookshops in Paris, Ofr Librairie, Galerie has been recommended by Condé Nast Traveler and other publications and is frequented visited during Paris Fashion Week. Time Out recommended it as one of the most arty bookstores in Paris, and Beaux Arts Magazine named it in a list of ten of Paris' art bookstores.

== History ==
In 1996, siblings Alexandre and Marie Thumerelle created a free newspaper called 0FR, meaning zero francs. Alexandre Thumerelle had previously organized festivals, made his own films, and even started a magazine. Through 0FR, they produced and distributed hundreds of zines all across the world, with over pop-up 150 locations.

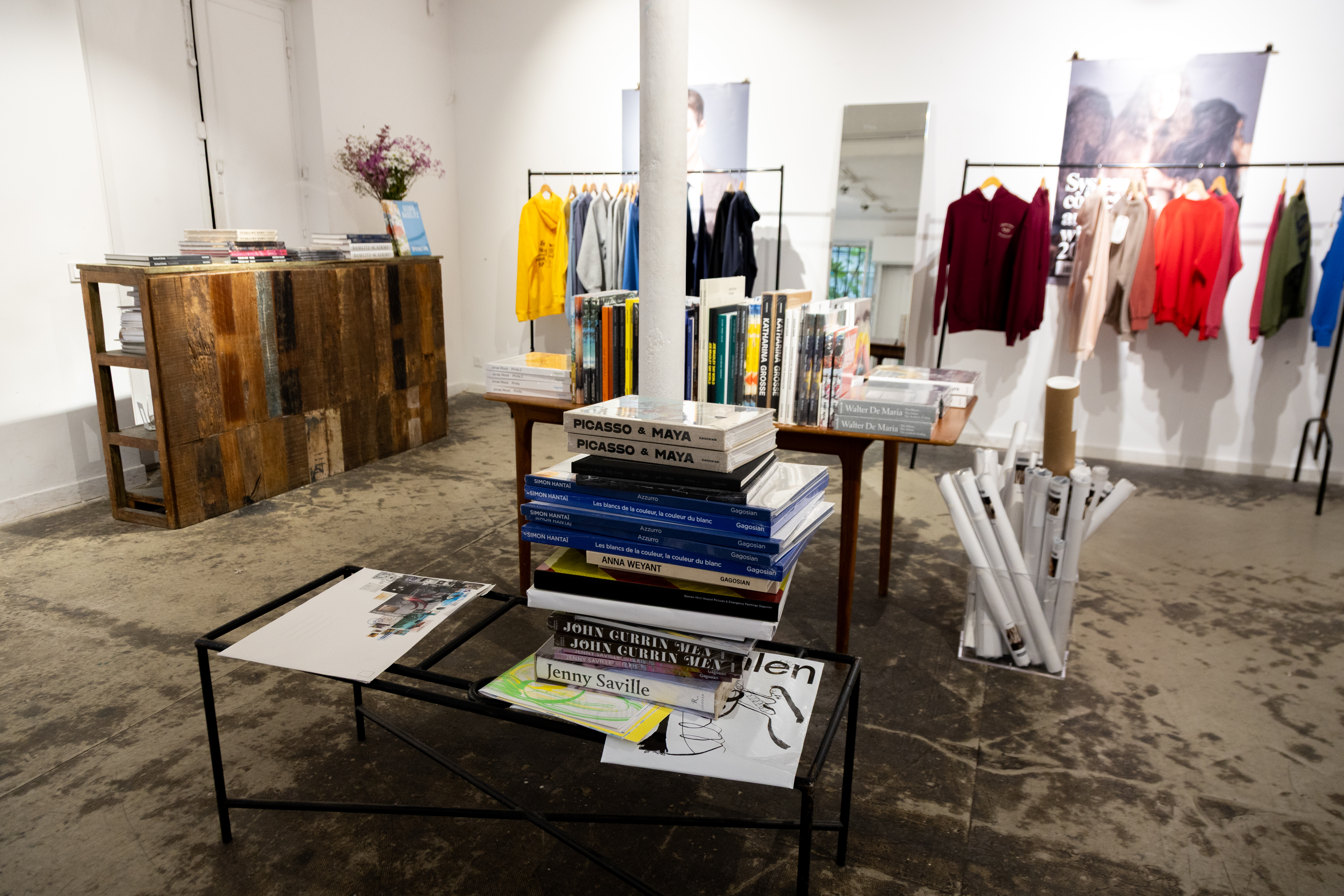
Gallery space behind the bookstore in 2025.

In 2007, the siblings settled down in a permanent location, with Ofr Librairie, Galerie in the Marais, to not only sell books but also create a space for artists and host events for the artistic community in Paris, The new name, with an "O" rather than a "0," stands for "Open Free and Ready."

== Boutique ==
In 2014, the Ofr Librairie, Galerie opened a clothing and furniture store, Ofr La Boutique, in Carreau du Temple.
