= Anthony Davis (disambiguation) =

Anthony Davis (born 1993) is an American basketball player.

Anthony Davis may also refer to:

== Sports ==
- Anthony Davis (cricketer) (1931–1978), English cricketer
- Anthony Davis (linebacker) (born 1969), American football linebacker
- Anthony Davis (offensive tackle, born 1980), American football offensive lineman
- Anthony Davis (offensive tackle, born 1989), American football offensive lineman
- Anthony Davis (running back, born 1952), American football running back who played in college for USC and professionally in the United States and Canada
- Anthony Davis (running back, born 1982), American football running back in the Canadian Football League

== Music ==
- Anthony Davis (composer) (born 1951), American composer and jazz pianist
- Anthony Davis, known as Ant (1970), American hip-hop producer
- Anthony Davis, known as Beenie Man (born 1973), Jamaican dancehall reggae musician
- Anthony Davis, bass player for Ruby (rock band)

== Other ==
- Anthony Davis (comedian) (born 1974), British comedian and radio presenter
- Anthony Norman Davis (1918–1988), British Royal Air Force officer
- Anthony P. Davis (born 1954), British organic chemist
- Anthony Davis (politician) (born 1980), American politician from Tennessee

== See also ==
- Tony Davis (disambiguation)
- Anthony Davies (disambiguation)
- Antonio Davis (born 1968), American former basketball player
- Antonio Davis (boxer) (born 1972), American boxer
