= List of Jude Law performances =

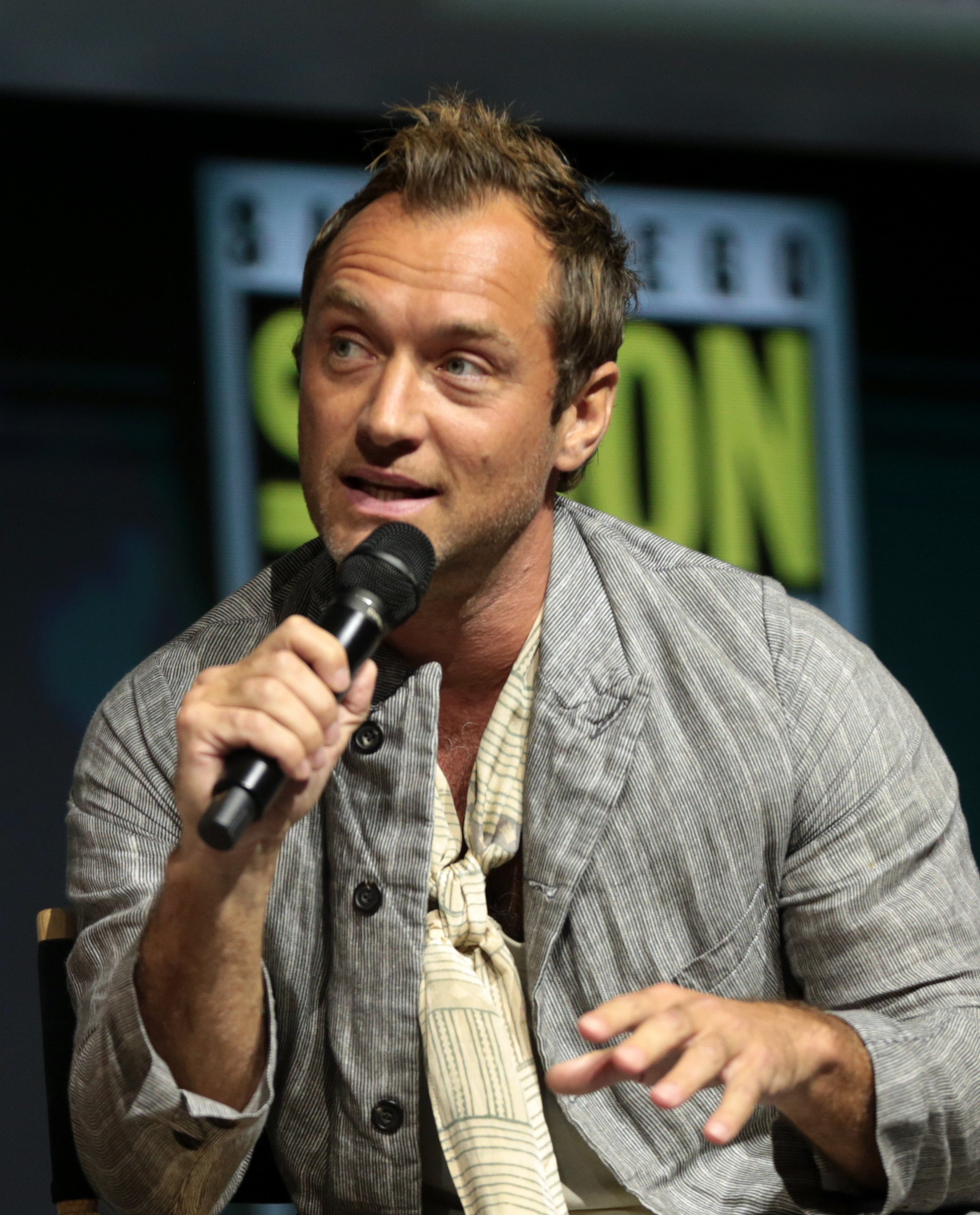
Law at the 2018 San Diego Comic-Con

Jude Law is an English actor. Law rose to prominence with his role in Anthony Minghella's The Talented Mr. Ripley (1999), for which he won the BAFTA Award for Best Actor in a Supporting Role and was nominated for the Academy Award in the same category. He gained additional critical acclaim and accolades for Cold Mountain (2003), also directed by Minghella.

Law is known for his roles in franchises, including as Dr. Watson in Sherlock Holmes (2009) and Sherlock Holmes: A Game of Shadows (2011), as Albus Dumbledore in Fantastic Beasts: The Crimes of Grindelwald (2018) and Fantastic Beasts: The Secrets of Dumbledore (2022), and as Yon-Rogg in Captain Marvel (2019), the 21st installment in the Marvel Cinematic Universe. Other notable roles include Gattaca (1997), Enemy at the Gates (2001), A.I. Artificial Intelligence (2001), Road to Perdition (2002), The Holiday (2006) and The Grand Budapest Hotel (2014); and on television in The Young Pope (2016) and The New Pope (2020).

== Film ==
Year	Title	Role	Notes
1989	The Tailor of Gloucester	Sam, Mayor's Stableboy	
1994	Shopping	Billy	
1996	I Love You, I Love You Not	Ethan	
1997	Bent	Stormtrooper	
1997	Wilde	Lord Alfred Douglas	
1997	Gattaca	Jerome Eugene Morrow	
1997	Midnight in the Garden of Good and Evil	Billy Hanson	
1998	Music from Another Room	Danny	
1998	Final Cut	Jude	
1998	The Wisdom of Crocodiles	Steven Grlscz	
1999	Existenz	Ted Pikul	
1999	Tube Tales	—N/a	Director of segment "A Bird in the Hand"
1999	Presence of Mind	Secretary	
1999	The Talented Mr. Ripley	Dickie Greenleaf	
2000	Love, Honour and Obey	Jude	
2001	Enemy at the Gates	Vasily Zaytsev	
2001	A.I. Artificial Intelligence	Gigolo Joe	
2002	Road to Perdition	Harlen Maguire	
2003	Cold Mountain	W.P. Inman	
2004	I Heart Huckabees	Brad Stand	
2004	Alfie	Alfie	
2004	Closer	Dan	
2004	The Aviator	Errol Flynn	
2004	Sky Captain and the World of Tomorrow	Sky Captain / Joseph Sullivan	Also producer
2004	Lemony Snicket's A Series of Unfortunate Events	Lemony Snicket	
2006	All the King's Men	Jack Burden	
2006	Breaking & Entering	Will Francis	
2006	The Holiday	Graham Simpkins	
2007	My Blueberry Nights	Jeremy	
2007	Sleuth	Milo	Also producer
2009	Rage	Minx	
2009	The Imaginarium of Doctor Parnassus	Imaginarium Tony (2nd transformation)	
2009	Sherlock Holmes	Dr. John Watson	
2010	Repo Men	Remy	
2011	Contagion	Alan Krumwiede	
2011	Hugo	Mr. Cabret	
2011	Sherlock Holmes: A Game of Shadows	Dr. John Watson	
2012	360	Michael Daly	
2012	Anna Karenina	Count Alexei Alexandrovich Karenin	
2012	Rise of the Guardians	Pitch/The Bogeyman	Voice role
2013	Side Effects	Dr. Jonathan Banks	
2013	Dom Hemingway	Dom Hemingway	
2014	The Grand Budapest Hotel	Young Author	
2014	Black Sea	Captain Robinson	
2015	Spy	Bradley Fine	
2016	Genius	Thomas Wolfe	
2017	King Arthur: Legend of the Sword	Vortigern	
2018	Vox Lux	The Manager	Also executive producer
2018	Fantastic Beasts: The Crimes of Grindelwald	Albus Dumbledore	
2019	Captain Marvel	Yon-Rogg	
2019	A Rainy Day in New York	Ted Davidoff	
2020	The Rhythm Section	Iain Boyd	
2020	The Nest	Rory O’Hara	
2022	Fantastic Beasts: The Secrets of Dumbledore	Albus Dumbledore	
2023	Peter Pan & Wendy	Captain Hook	
2023	Firebrand	Henry VIII	
2024	The Order	Terry Husk	
2024	Eden	Dr. Friedrich Ritter	
2025	The Wizard of the Kremlin	Vladimir Putin	
2027	Paris Paramount	TBA	Filming

== Television ==
Year	Title	Role	Notes
1990	Families	Nathan Thompson	
1991	The Case-Book of Sherlock Holmes	Joe Barnes	Episode: "Shoscombe Old Place"
2004, 2010	Saturday Night Live	Himself / host	2 episodes
2015	Toast of London	Himself	Episode: "Global Warming"
2016	The Young Pope	Lenny Belardo / Pope Pius XIII	10 episodes; also producer
2017–2018	Neo Yokio	Charles	Voice role; 7 episodes
2020	The New Pope	Lenny Belardo / Pope Pius XIII	9 episodes; also executive producer
2020	The Third Day	Sam	5 episodes
2023	What If...?	Yon-Rogg (voice)	Episode: "What If... Nebula Joined the Nova Corps?"
2024–2025	Star Wars: Skeleton Crew	Jod Na Nawood	8 episodes
2025	Black Rabbit	Jake Friedken	Also executive producer
2027	Wild Things †	Siegfried Fischbacher	Upcoming miniseries, also executive producer

Key
†	Denotes television productions that have not yet been released

== Theatre ==
Year	Title	Role	Venue	Ref.
1987	Bodywork	Adrenalin	National Youth Music Theatre production; Northcott Theatre, Exeter (The Exeter Festival); Edinburgh Festival Fringe	
1988	The Ragged Child	Various roles	National Youth Music Theatre production; Sadler's Wells Theatre; Northcott Theatre, Exeter	
1988	The Little Rats		National Youth Music Theatre production; George Square Theatre (Edinburgh International Festival); National Theatre of Northern Greece, Thessaloniki; The Opera House (The Municipal Theatre), Piraeus	
1989	Joseph and the Amazing Technicolor Dreamcoat	Joseph	National Youth Music Theatre production; Herriot Hall (Edinburgh Festival Fringe)	
1989	The Caucasian Chalk Circle		National Youth Music Theatre production; Edinburgh Festival Fringe	
1990	Captain Stirrick	Ned Stirrick	National Youth Music Theatre production; George Square Theatre (Edinburgh Festival Fringe)	
1992	The Fastest Clock in the Universe	Foxtrot Darling	Hampstead Theatre	
1992	Pygmalion	Freddie	Tour through Italy	
1993	The Snow Orchid	Blaise	Gate Theatre	
1993	Live Like Pigs	Col	Royal Court Theatre	
1993	Death of a Salesman	Happy	West Yorkshire Playhouse, Leeds	
1994	Les Parents terribles	Michael	Lyttelton Theatre	
1995	Indiscretions	Michael	Ethel Barrymore Theatre, Broadway	
1995	Ion	Ion	Royal Shakespeare Company production; The Pit at Barbican Arts Centre	
1999	'Tis Pity She's a Whore	Giovanni	Young Vic Theatre	
2002	Doctor Faustus	Doctor Faustus	Young Vic Theatre	
2006	Beckett at Reading, Gala Evening		Concert Hall, Reading	
2009	Hamlet	Hamlet	Donmar at Wyndham's Theatre; Kronborg Castle, Elsinore; Broadhurst Theatre on Broadway	
2011	Anna Christie	Mat Burke	Donmar Warehouse	
2013–2014	Henry V	Henry V	Noël Coward Theatre	
2015	The Vote		Donmar Warehouse	
2017	Obsession	Gino	Barbican Theatre; Wiener Festwochen; Koninklijk Theater Carre; Grand Théâtre de Luxembourg	
