= Jean-François Milou =

French Architect

Jean-François Milou is a French architect known for cultural, museum, and adaptive-reuse projects in France and Southeast Asia. He is the founder and lead architect of studioMilou, whose work includes the National Gallery Singapore, the Carreau du Temple in Paris, La Cité de la Mer in Cherbourg, the Musée des Tumulus de Bougon and multiple museum and cultural projects in Vietnam. Milou has also worked as a consultant for UNESCO and for the French government-related heritage projects in India, Nepal, Indonesia and Georgia.

Milou's best-known international project is the National Gallery Singapore, the conversion of Singapore's former City Hall and former Supreme Court into a major museum of Singaporean and Southeast Asian art. studioMilou Architecture, working with CPG Consultants, was appointed after an international competition and the completed project received Singapore's President's Design Award, Design of the Year in 2015. In 2018, Milou was made Chevalier of the Ordre national du Merite in Singapore for his contribution to French and international architecture and to cultural ties between France and Singapore.

== Early life and education ==
Milou was born in Niort, France, in 1953. He graduated from the École Nationale Supérieure des Beaux-Arts in Paris.

== Career ==
Milou founded studioMilou Architecture in Paris, where the practice developed a specialisation in the reuse of existing buildings, museum design and cultural projects. The firm later established offices in Singapore and Vietnam. Milou's team set up in Singapore after winning the National Gallery Singapore competition and that studioMilou's work was largely based in France, Singapore and Vietnam by 2016.

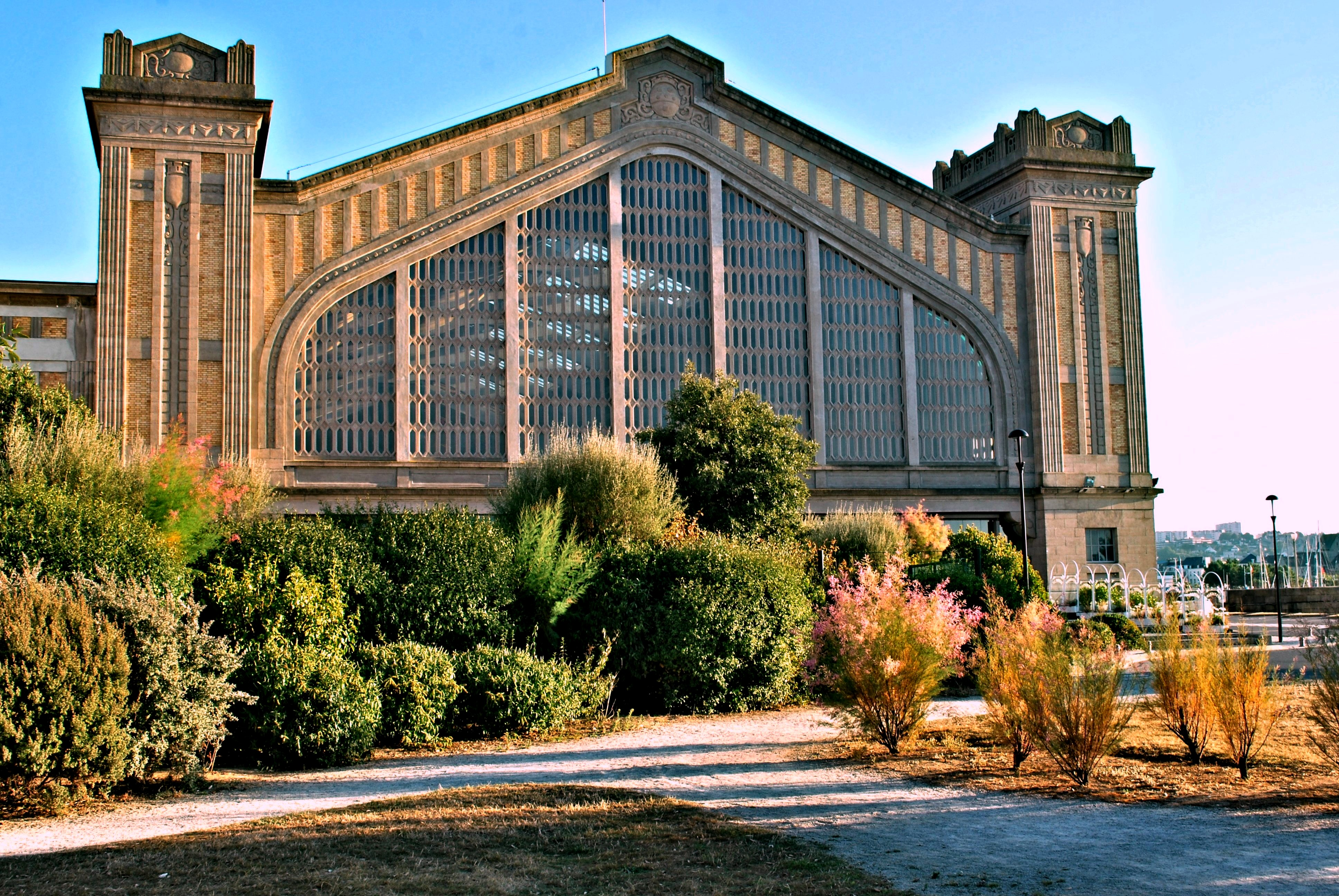
La Cité de la Mer, Cherbourg

In France, Milou's early and later works included the Musée des Tumulus de Bougon, La Cité de la Mer in Cherbourg, the Musée National de l'Automobile in Mulhouse and the Carreau du Temple in Paris. The Bougon project, a museum connected to a Neolithic burial site in western France, is presented by studioMilou as the result of a 1991 European competition, with completion of the first museum phase in 1993 and later phases in 1997 and 2004. La Cité de la Mer was developed around the former Cherbourg maritime station and the nuclear submarine Le Redoubtable; La Pierre d'Angle describes Milou as the competition laureate and identifies his central design idea as placing the submarine outside the existing buildings while creating a museum beside the dry dock.

Carreau du Temple, Paris

The Carreau du Temple, a nineteenth-century iron-and-glass market hall in the Marais district of Paris, was awarded to studioMilou after a 2007 competition and reopened in 2014 as a cultural and sports facility while preserving the hall's historic structure. The project restored the iron structure, replaced brick infill with glazing and integrated contemporary acoustic and insulation standards into the nineteenth-century framework.

=== National Gallery Singapore ===
National Gallery Singapore, Singapore

The National Gallery Singapore project began after an international design competition for the conversion of the former Supreme Court and City Hall into a national art gallery. The competition was organised by Singapore's Ministry of Information, Communications and the Arts with the Singapore Institute of Architects, launched in February 2007 and drew 111 entries from 29 countries. studioMilou Architecture from France, working with CPG Consultants from Singapore was named the first of three winning design teams in August 2007 and was appointed in May 2008 as principal consultant to design and build the new gallery.

Milou led the design team for studioMilou and Architectural Record described him as the principal of the Paris-based practice whose team won the international competition in partnership with CPG Consultants. The completed project opened in November 2015 as part of Singapore's fiftieth-anniversary year as an independent republic.

National Gallery Singapore; Interior, Singapore

The design joined the two buildings through a filigree metal-and-glass roof supported by tree-like structures and through a basement concourse that linked the buildings from below. The President's Design Award jury described the project as balancing preservation and innovation, leaving the existing structures intact to the greatest degree possible while adding a roof, sky bridges, rooftop spaces and a public basement concourse. Architectural Record reported that the heritage status of the buildings restricted changes to external façades and entrances and that parts of the old buildings, including historically sensitive rooms, were preserved as part of the museum conversion.

The work on the National Gallery Singapore also led to Milou's Decoration of the French National Order of Merit in Singapore in 2018, in recognition of his contributions to architecture.

=== Vietnam and later work ===
Milou and studioMilou have worked on a series of cultural and educational projects in Vietnam, including the International Centre for Interdisciplinary Science and Education (ICISE) in Quy Nhon, the Binh Dinh Convention Centre and the Da Nang Museum. The ICISE project in Quy Nhon was commissioned by Rencontres du Vietnam with the public opening in August 2013.

The Da Nang Museum project adapts a historic municipal building on the Han River into a contemporary museum. The project uses a courtyard plan, layered façade and exhibition route linking historical and contemporary displays.

== Awards and recognition ==
Milou received the rank of Chevalier of the Ordre National du Mérite in Singapore in 2018.

The National Gallery Singapore received the President's Design Award Singapore, Design of the Year in 2015, for the work of studioMilou Singapore Pte. Ltd. and CPG Consultants Pte. Ltd. The Binh Dinh Convention Centre received a Public Architecture Commendation in the Australian Institute of Architects' 2021 International Architecture Awards.

== Selected work ==
Project	Image	Location	Date/status	Ref
Musée des Tumulus de Bougon		Bougon, France	First phase completed 1993; later phases in 1997 and 2004	
La Cité de la Mer	La Cité de la Mer, Cherbourg	Cherbourg, France	Opened in phases from 2002	
Musée National de l'Automobile/ Cité de l'Automobile	Le Musée de l'Automobile, Mulhouse	Mulhouse, France	Reopened after 2000s renovation	
Carreau du Temple	Carreau du Temple, Paris	Paris, France	Reopened in 2014	
National Gallery Singapore	National Gallery Singapore, Singapore	Singapore	Completed 2015	
International Centre of Interdisciplinary of Science and Education		Quy Nhon, Vietnam	Public opening in 2013	
Binh Dinh Convention Centre		Quy Nhon, Vietnam	Completed before 2021	
Da Nang Museum		Da Nang, Vietnam	Opening from 2025	
