= Malcolm McRae =

American musician (born 1994)

- McRae in 2026
- Born: Malcolm Wellman McRae; April 16, 1994 (age 32)
- Occupations: Singer; songwriter; musician; actor
- Years active: 2020–present
- Spouse: Anya Taylor-Joy (m. 2022)

Malcolm Wellman McRae (born April 16, 1994) is an American musician and actor.

== Early life ==
McRae grew up in the Birmingham area of Alabama, the son of investment banker William Barry McRae and Lesley Rainier Wellman. His father died in 2012, when McRae was 18 years old. McRae later moved to Los Angeles.

== Career ==
=== Music ===
McRae is a guitarist, pianist and singer. He is a member of the two-person rock band more* alongside Kane Ritchotte, a former member of Portugal. The Man. After meeting in LA's Beachwood Canyon neighborhood, the pair co-wrote songs over a three-year period culminating in the release of their first EP, entitled 1/2, in July 2020, and their second EP, 2/2, in September 2021. The music video for their song God's in the Details was created by Gina Gammell and Riley Keough. Other music videos for the band have been directed by Malcolm's brother Keene McRae and his film-making partner, Brandon Bernath, who introduced the pair. They have supported the bands Bad Suns and Grouplove. In 2022, they supported HAIM on their North American tour.

=== Acting ===
In 2022, it was reported that McRae had been cast in a biopic of musician Jeff Buckley. In the Prime Video television series Daisy Jones and the Six, McRae and Ritchotte portrayed members of the fictional psychedelic 1970s band The Winters. In 2023, McRae was cast in the fantasy horror film Triton alongside Raff Law and Freya Allan.

== Personal life ==
McRae married actress Anya Taylor-Joy on April 1, 2022, in New Orleans. They held a second wedding during the last weekend of September 2023 at the Palazzo Pisani Moretta in Venice.
