= Thalia Besson =

French actress (born 2001)

- Born: 1 August 2001 (age 25)
- Education: Parsons Paris
- Occupations: Actress; model
- Years active: 2017–present
- Television: Emily in Paris
- Parents: Luc Besson (father); Virginie Besson (mother)
- Relatives: Shanna Besson (half-sister)

Thalia Besson (born 1 August 2001) is a French actress and model. She is the daughter of French filmmaker Luc Besson.

== Early life ==
She was born in France, and graduated from Parsons Paris with a Bachelor of Business Administration (BBA) in Strategic Design and Management in 2023.

== Career ==
She made appearances in Valerian and the City of a Thousand Planets (2017) and Arthur, malédiction (2022). She played the role of Tabitha in Dangerous Waters in 2023. She filmed apocalypse love story When I'm Ready in 2022.

In 2023, she was cast in the fantasy horror film Triton alongside Raff Law and Freya Allan. In 2024, she had the role of Geneviève in season four of Netflix series Emily in Paris. Her character was described as the show's "first villain".

== Personal life ==
She is the daughter of Canadian-French film producer Virginie Besson-Silla and French filmmaker Luc Besson. As well as acting, she has worked as a model.

== Filmography ==
Key
†	Denotes works that have not yet been released

Year	Title	Role	Notes
2017	Valerian and the City of a Thousand Planets	The Officer	Feature film
2022	Arthur, malédiction	Samantha	Film
2023	Dangerous Waters	Tabitha	
2024	Emily in Paris	Geneviève	Series Four
2025	When I'm Ready	Michelle	
TBA	Triton †	TBA	
