= Struan Rodger =

British actor (born 1946)

- Born: 18 September 1946 (age 80); Manchester, England
- Occupation: Actor

Struan Rodger (born 18 September 1946) is a British actor who has appeared widely in a range of supporting roles. He appeared briefly in Who Is Killing the Great Chefs of Europe? in 1978 but his first major film role was as Eric Liddell's friend and running coach Sandy McGrath, in the Oscar-winning 1981 film, Chariots of Fire. His later films included Diamond Skulls (1989), Four Weddings and a Funeral (1994), The Madness of King George (1994), The Innocent Sleep (1996) and Stardust (2007).

Rodger is perhaps best known for his portrayal of Barbara Flynn's husband in the television detective series Chandler & Co. Rodger had a recurring role on Rumpole of the Bailey as Detective Inspector Brush, a police detective noted for what Rumpole perceives as flagrant abuses of the law. He provided the voice for the Doctor Who character Face of Boe in the stories "New Earth" and "Gridlock".

Rodger has also appeared on television in episodes of Boys from the Blackstuff, Bergerac, Strangers and Brothers, Miss Marple, Maigret, Midsomer Murders (in the episode "Four Funerals and a Wedding"), Vera and Look and Read, as well as portraying Bonnie Prince Charlie in "Through a Glass, Darkly," a season four episode of Highlander: The Series.

In 2009, he appeared in The First Domino at Brighton Festival Fringe. In 2014, he played the mythical Three-Eyed Raven in the Game of Thrones episode "The Children"; he was replaced by Max von Sydow when the character reappeared in the sixth season.

Also in 2009, Rodger made his video game debut in Wallace & Gromit's Grand Adventures as the con artist Monty Muzzle, in the episodes "Muzzled!" and "The Bogey Man", although he was erroneously credited as "Straun Rogers"

From 2011 to 2018, he narrated annual official films for The Open Championship.

== Filmography ==
| Year | Title | Role |
|---|---|---|
| 1973 | Joe and the Sheep Rustlers | Joe |
| 1978 | Who Is Killing the Great Chefs of Europe? | Asst. Director |
| 1981 | Chariots of Fire | Sandy McGrath |
| 1989 | Reunion | Pompetski |
| 1989 | Diamond Skulls | Peter Eggleton |
| 1991 | Afraid of the Dark | Window Cleaner |
| 1994 | Four Weddings and a Funeral | Best Man - Wedding Three |
| 1994 | The Madness of King George | Dundas |
| 1994 | Nexus 2.431 | Azhar |
| 1996 | The Innocent Sleep | Peter Samson |
| 2003 | Young Adam | Judge |
| 2007 | Stardust | Bishop |
| 2011 | Kill List | The Client |
| 2011 | 7 Lives | Rory's Dad |
| 2017 | The Marker | Jimmy Doyle |
| 2021 | A Discovery of Witches | John Dee |
