= When I'm Ready =

2025 film directed by Andrew Johnson

- Theatrical release poster
- Directed by: Andrew Johnson
- Written by: Andrew Ortenberg
- Produced by: Andrew Ortenberg; Eli Samek; Jordan Dykstra; Robert Ballo
- Starring: Andrew Ortenberg; June Schreiner; Lauren Cohan; Dermot Mulroney
- Cinematography: Rachael Kliman
- Edited by: Sophie Dick
- Music by: Gilbert Cameron Evans
- Production companies: Briarcliff Entertainment; 19th Hole Productions; Film Bridge International
- Distributed by: Briarcliff Entertainment; Quiver Distribution
- Release date: February 7, 2025
- Running time: 107 minutes
- Country: United States
- Language: English
- Box office: $11,372 (domestic)

When I'm Ready is a 2025 American apocalyptic romantic thriller film directed by Andrew Johnson and written by Andrew Ortenberg, who also stars in the film alongside June Schreiner, Lauren Cohan, and Dermot Mulroney.

== Plot ==
Set against the backdrop of an asteroid cluster threatening to end all life on Earth, When I'm Ready follows Rose and Michael, a young couple who set out to make the most of their final days by embarking on a cross-country road trip to visit Rose's grandmother one last time. Along the way they encounter a rotating cast of characters including Julia (Cohan), a former beauty queen holding out hope for last minute love, and Keith (Mulroney), a solitary drifter searching for any human connection, each looking for something different out of the end.

== Cast ==
- Andrew Ortenberg as Michael
- June Schreiner as Rose
- Lauren Cohan as Julia
- Dermot Mulroney as Keith
- Thalia Besson as Michelle

== Production ==
The film marks the directorial debut of Andrew Johnson, who previously worked as an art director and production designer. The screenplay was penned by Andrew Ortenberg, who also stars in the film. Filming took place across various locations in the United States in late 2022 in order to simulate a cross-country road trip.

Bryan Curtis, Editor-at-large of The Ringer and host of The Press Box, voices a DJ who helps narrate the last days on earth over the car's radio.

== Release ==
The film was released in select US theaters on February 7, 2025, jointly by Briarcliff Entertainment and Quiver Distribution, with a digital release following on February 14, 2025. It grossed $8,220 in its opening weekend domestically and $11,372 cumulatively.

== Reception ==
Don Shanahan of Every Movie Has a Lesson called it "a lovely odyssey of warmth fighting back bleakness" while Lissete Lanuza Saenz of Fangirlish writes that it's "a quietly tragic, but still very poignant movie about finding happiness as the world around you ends—literally."
