= Iris Law =

British-American model and actress (born 2000)

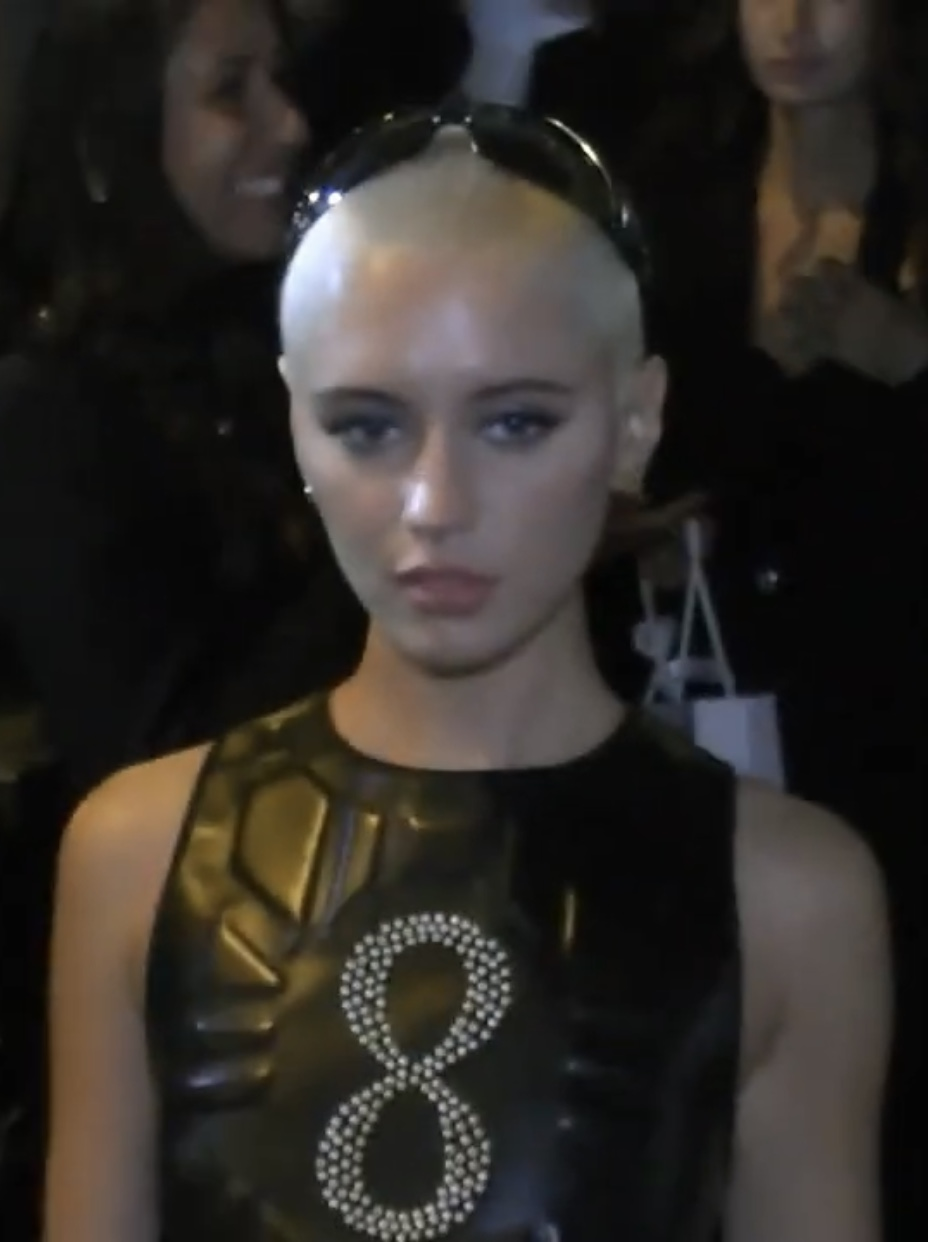
- Law in 2021
- Born: Iris Tallulah Elizabeth Law; 25 October 2000 (age 26); Santa Monica, California, U.S.
- Occupations: Model; actress
- Parents: Jude Law (father); Sadie Frost (mother)
- Relatives: Raff Law (brother); Natasha Law (aunt)

Iris Tallulah Elizabeth Law (born 25 October 2000) is a British-American model and actress.

== Early life ==
Law was born in Santa Monica to English actors Jude Law and Sadie Frost and grew up between her parents' North London houses in Primrose Hill and Highgate. She has two brothers, Rafferty and Rudy, one maternal half-brother, and four paternal half-siblings. Her godmother is British supermodel Kate Moss. In October 2002, when she was 2 years old, she was hospitalized after swallowing an MDMA tablet while attending a birthday party at Soho House. She completed her GCSEs in 2017. She studied textiles at Central Saint Martins.

== Career ==
Law's career in fashion started with a photoshoot for a brand called Illustrated People, from there she was contacted by an agent; she was then chosen by Christopher Bailey to be the face of Burberry's beauty campaign. She appeared in the 2017 lookbook for the Miu Miu resort. She has appeared in adverts for Marc Jacobs, La Perla, and Stella McCartney, as well as Lacoste, Calvin Klein, and Versace. In 2021, she became an ambassador for Dior Beauty. She made her runway debut at Miu Miu's A/W 2020 fashion show. She had already appeared in a Vogue editorial as a toddler.

Law was cast as Soo Catwoman in the miniseries Pistol, for which she shaved her head.
