= Habit (2021 film) =

2021 film by Janell Shirtcliff

- Release poster
- Directed by: Janell Shirtcliff
- Screenplay by: Libby Mintz; Janell Shirtcliff
- Produced by: Donovan Leitch; Josie Ho; Libby Mintz; Michael Suppes; Bella Thorne
- Starring: Bella Thorne; Gavin Rossdale; Libby Mintz; Andreja Pejić; Ione Skye; Jamie Hince; Alison Mosshart; Paris Jackson; Josie Ho
- Cinematography: Rain Li
- Edited by: Brandon French
- Music by: Paige Stark; Luke Paquin
- Production companies: Voltage Pictures; Grindstone Entertainment Group; Elevated Films; 852 Films; Cloudlight; Martingale Pictures
- Distributed by: Lionsgate
- Release date: August 20, 2021
- Running time: 81 minutes
- Country: United States
- Language: English

Habit is a 2021 American comedy thriller film directed by Janell Shirtcliff in her feature directorial debut, from a screenplay by Shirtcliff and Libby Mintz. It stars Bella Thorne, Gavin Rossdale, Libby Mintz, Andreja Pejić, Ione Skye, Jamie Hince, Alison Mosshart, Paris Jackson, and Josie Ho.

The film was released in select theaters and on video on demand in the United States on August 20, 2021, by Lionsgate.

== Premise ==
A Los Angeles girl goes on the run with her friends. The group hide out while dressed as nuns when they run afoul of a drug lord.

== Cast ==
- Josie Ho as Queenie
- Bella Thorne as Mads
- Paris Jackson as Jesus
- Hana Mae Lee as Jewel
- Gavin Rossdale as Eric
- Caroline D'Amore as L'Amour
- Andreja Pejić as Addy
- Larissa Andrade as Alicia
- Libby Mintz as Evie
- Jamie Hince as Tuff
- Ada Mogilevsky as Hailey
- Damon Lawner as Father Damon
- Michael Suppes as Tomas
- Alison Mosshart as Veda
- Soko
- Bria Vinaite

== Production ==
Bella Thorne, Gavin Rossdale, Jamie Hince, Soko, and Alison Mosshart joined the cast of the film in early 2020, with Janell Shirtcliff directing from a screenplay by Suki Kaiser from a story by Shirtcliff and Libby Mintz, with Josie Ho serving as a producer and Thorne as an executive producer. By April 2020, Josie Ho, Paris Jackson, Andreja Pejic, Bria Vinaite, and Libby Mintz had joined the cast of the film.

== Reception ==
=== Critical response ===
On the review aggregator website Rotten Tomatoes, 6% of 16 critics' reviews are positive, with an average rating of 3.2/10.

=== Controversy ===
The film attracted controversy by the Christian right for the supposedly blasphemous and sacrilegious themes of depicting Jesus as lesbian before its release. As of June 30, 2020, more than 260,000 people had signed a petition in order to block the film. Detractors labelled the film as "Christianophobic garbage" as well as claiming that it aims to "ridicule people of faith". The New York Post compared the controversy to that of the 2019 Brazilian satirical film The First Temptation of Christ, which depicted Jesus as gay and resulted in a ban overturned by the Supreme Federal Court. However, there is no indication of promotional materials that portray Jesus as a lesbian.
