= Tony Davis =

Tony Davis may refer to:

- Tony Davis (cornerback) (born 1986), American football defensive back, Arizona Cardinals and Penn State
- Tony Davis (Gaelic footballer) (born 1964), Gaelic football player, O'Donovan Rossa, Cork
- Tony Davis (running back) (1953–2026), American football running back, Cincinnati Bengals, Tampa Bay Buccaneers, Nebraska
- Tony Davis (boxing coach) (born 1974), British boxer and boxing coach
- Tony Davis (1930–2017), British folk singer, member of The Spinners

== See also ==
- Anthony Davis (disambiguation)
- Anthony Davies (disambiguation), includes Tony Davies
- Antonio Davis (born 1968), American basketball player
