= Anthony Davies (disambiguation) =

Anthony Davies (born 1969) is a Welsh snooker player.

Anthony or Tony Davies may also refer to:

- Tony Davies (1939–2008), New Zealand rugby player
- Tony Davies (boxer) (born 1952), Welsh boxer
- Tony Davies (priest) (born 1946), Archdeacon of Croydon
- Anthony Mark Davies (cricketer, born 1980)
- Anthony Davies, fictional character on Australian soap opera Neighbours

== See also ==
- Anthony Davis (disambiguation)
- Tony Davis (disambiguation)
