= Natasha Law =

English painter and graphic designer (born 1970)

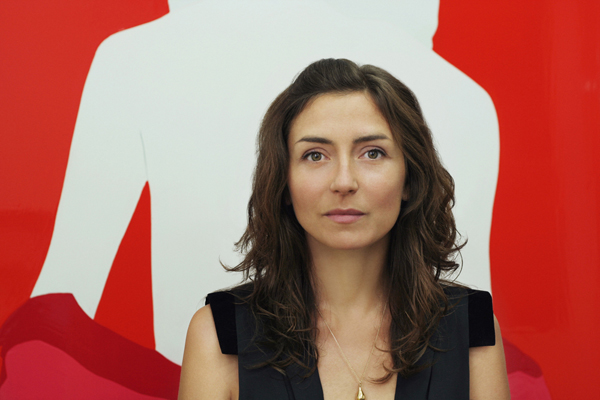
- Law in 2008
- Born: 1 January 1970 (age 56); Lewisham, London, England
- Education: Warwick University; Camberwell College of Art
- Occupations: Painter, graphic designer
- Children: 3
- Relatives: Jude Law (brother); Raff Law (nephew); Iris Law (niece)

Andrea Natasha Heyworth Law (born 1 January 1970) is an English painter and graphic designer.

== Early life ==
Law was born in Lewisham, on 1 January 1970. She was the first child of Margaret Anne (née Heyworth) and Peter Robert Law, both teachers. Natasha is the elder sister of Jude Law, an English actor.

She gained experience acting at the Bob Hope Theatre (then called the Eltham Little Theatre) in Eltham, where she performed in Teenage Follies in 1982. She first went to University of Warwick to study history, but soon switched to studying art at Camberwell College of Arts in South London.

== Career ==
After graduation, Law embarked on a career that encompassed graphic illustration, photography and styling. She has worked with Vogue, Max Mara, Teen Vogue, Globe-Trotter, Harrods, Samsung, Tiffany & Co, and Mulberry. Her artwork is exhibited in galleries in London, Hong Kong, and New York.

== Works ==
Law's artworks and projects includes a series called My Flash on You which is exhibited at Eleven Gallery in the UK in 2022. The paintings depict women in the act of dressing or undressing, made with gloss paint on aluminium and paper.

== Personal life ==
She lives in Peckham, London, with her husband and three children.
