= Sadie Frost =

English actress, producer, film director and fashion designer (born 1965)

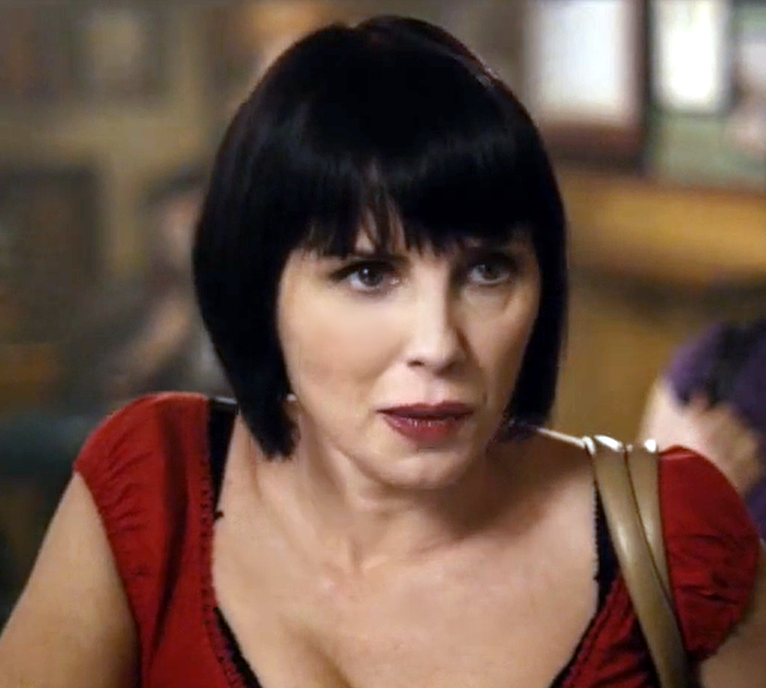
- Frost in the short film Fortune's Smile in 2015
- Born: Sadie Liza Vaughan; 19 June 1965 (age 61); Islington, London, England
- Education: Italia Conti Academy of Theatre Arts
- Occupation: Actress
- Years active: 1979–present
- Spouses: Gary Kemp (m. 1988; div. 1995); Jude Law (m. 1997; div. 2003)
- Children: 4, including Raff and Iris
- Father: David Vaughan

Sadie Liza Frost (née Vaughan; born 19 June 1965) is an English actress, producer and fashion designer. Her credits as an actress include Empire State (1987), Diamond Skulls, also known as Dark Obsession (1989), Bram Stoker's Dracula (1992), The Krays (1990), Magic Hunter (1994), Shopping (1994), A Pyromaniac's Love Story (1995), Flypaper (1997), Final Cut (1998), Captain Jack (1999), Love, Honour and Obey (2000), Beyond the Rave (2008), Molly Moon and the Incredible Book of Hypnotism (2015), and A Bird Flew In (2021).

She later turned to directing with Quant (2021), and Twiggy (2025).

== Early life ==
Frost was born in Islington, North London, in 1965 to actress Mary Davidson, who was sixteen at the time of Sadie's birth, and psychedelic artist David Vaughan, in his second marriage, who worked for the Beatles. Frost's sister, daughter of Davidson and Vaughan, named Sunshine Purple Tara Velvet, is one year younger.

She has described her childhood as a "chaotic but positive experience". She spent much of her youth in Ashton-under-Lyne, Lancashire, after her parents separated. She has ten siblings, including fellow actresses Holly Davidson and Jade Davidson; primary school teacher Jessi Frost; and brothers called Gabriel Jupiter Vaughan and Tobias Vaughan.

We lived on a bus which we drove from Belsize Park to Morocco. We'd pitch up everywhere from Formentera, in a house with no electricity, to the Mull of Kintyre.

Frost attained a scholarship to attend the Italia Conti Academy.

By the time I was 11, I'd got a scholarship to the Italia Conti stage school. I went from singing musicals in front of the mirror to cutting all my hair off, quitting stage school and going to the local comprehensive because I fancied the boy next door who was a punk.

In 2019, she furthered her education by earning a master's degree in film production.

== Career ==
In 1968, Frost's debut acting role was for Jelly Tots. Frost's debut film role was in Empire State (1987), in a cast which included Martin Landau. She played the part of Rebecca in the 1989 film Diamond Skulls (also known as Dark Obsession), alongside Amanda Donohoe and Gabriel Byrne. She later said that this role paved the way for her film appearance as the ill-fated Lucy Westenra in Francis Ford Coppola's Bram Stoker's Dracula (1992).

In the 1990s, she appeared in music videos, including for Pulp's song "Common People", Planet Perfecto featuring Grace's "Not Over Yet '99", various productions for Spandau Ballet, where she met first husband Gary Kemp. During their marriage, they appeared together in two films, The Krays (1990), and Magic Hunter (1994).

In 1994, Frost met her future husband Jude Law when she took a role opposite him in Paul W. S. Anderson's directorial film debut Shopping. Frost and Law appeared together again in the British gangster comedy Love, Honour and Obey (2000), alongside Ray Winstone, Jonny Lee Miller, Kathy Burke, Sean Pertwee, Denise Van Outen, and Rhys Ifans.

In 1997, Frost and Law co-founded the production company Natural Nylon, along with others including Jonny Lee Miller, Ewan McGregor, and Sean Pertwee. After six years, the company closed down. In 1999, Frost co-founded the fashion label Frost French with her friend Jemima French.

In 2004, she wrote, presented and produced a short-lived series What Sadie did next... for E4, and in 2006 appeared in Eating with... Sadie Frost on BBC2, to talk about her switch to vegetarianism.

Frost has been a member of the jury at the British Independent Film Awards, on two occasions, in 1999 and 2022.

Frost directed the film Twiggy (2025), about the life of fashion icon, television presenter and actress Twiggy.

== Personal life ==
Frost had an eating disorder in her youth. In 1983, auditioning for in a music video, Frost met Spandau Ballet's Gary Kemp. They married on 7 May 1988. Their son Finlay was born in 1990. Frost and Kemp were married for seven years and divorced on 19 August 1995.

Frost met Jude Law during the work on the 1994 film Shopping. They married in September 1997 and have three children, including Rafferty and Iris. Frost and Law divorced on 29 October 2003 after separating that January. Kate Moss is godparent to one child and Nick Grimshaw to another.

Frost maintains she has never been a party animal, having been too busy being a mother, and she has maintained a healthy lifestyle of exercise, yoga, and a vegetarian diet.

Frost was a victim of the News International phone hacking scandal, after it was found that they intruded on her private life, damaged her reputation as a successful businesswoman, and caused embarrassment and humiliation on issues that would have been kept private. She received an apology from Mirror Group Newspapers, and was awarded damages.

In July 2026, Frost was among seven well-known figures who lost a High Court privacy case against Associated Newspapers, the publisher of the Daily Mail and The Mail on Sunday.

== Filmography ==
=== Film ===
Year	Title	Role	Notes
1987	Empire State		
1989	Diamond Skulls (also known as Dark Obsession)	Rebecca	
1990	The Krays	Sharon Pellam	
1992	Bram Stoker's Dracula	Lucy Westenra	
1993	Splitting Heirs	Angela	
1994	Shopping	Jo	
1994	Magic Hunter	Eva	
1995	A Pyromaniac's Love Story	Hattie	
1996	Crimetime		
1997	Bent		
1998	Flypaper	Natalie	
1998	Final Cut	Sadie	
1999	Captain Jack	Tessa	
1999	Presence of Mind		
2000	An Ideal Husband	Mrs. Laura Cheveley	
2000	Rancid Aluminium		
2000	Love, Honour and Obey	Sadie	
2007	Shoot on Sight		
2008	The Heavy	Dutch	
2008	Beyond the Rave	Fallen Angel	
2014	Deadly Virtues: Love.Honour.Obey.	Beautiful Woman	
2014	The Confusion of Tongues	Herself	
2015	Molly Moon and the Incredible Book of Hypnotism	Mrs. Alabaster	
2015	Set the Thames on Fire	Mrs. Hortense	
2019	Nocturnal	Jean	
2020	Waiting for Anya	Madame Jollet	
2021	A Bird Flew In	Diane	
2021	Quant		Director
2023	Rise of the Footsoldier: Vengeance	Jan	
2024	Twiggy		Director
TBA	Boxed-Up †	Eileen	In pre-production
TBA	The Chelsea Cowboy †	Cissy Bindon	In post-production

Key
†	Denotes films that have not yet been released

=== Television ===
Year	Title	Role	Notes
1989	Press Gang	Jenny Eliot	2 episodes
1990	A Ghost in Monte Carlo	Alice 20 Yrs	Television film
2001	Uprising	Zivia Lubetkin	Television film
2024	Geek Girl	The Director	1 episode
