= Flypaper (1998 film) =

- Home video cover
- Directed by: Klaus Hoch
- Written by: Klaus Hoch
- Produced by: David R. Ginsburg; Leanne Moore
- Starring: Craig Sheffer; Robert Loggia; Sadie Frost; John C. McGinley; Illeana Douglas; Talisa Soto; Lucy Liu
- Cinematography: Jürgen Baum
- Edited by: Susan R. Crutcher
- Music by: Peter Manning Robinson
- Production company: Citadel Entertainment
- Distributed by: Trimark Home Video; HBO
- Release date: February 26, 1998 (AFM)
- Running time: 112 minutes
- Country: United States
- Language: English

Flypaper is a 1998 American independent comedy film written and directed by Klaus Hoch and starring Craig Sheffer, Robert Loggia, Sadie Frost, John C. McGinley, Illeana Douglas, Talisa Soto, and Lucy Liu. It tells three intertwining tales of violence, sex, and betrayal in Southern California. The film premiered at the American Film Market in 1998 before being released direct-to-video in 2000. The film has been criticized as a Pulp Fiction rip-off.

== Plot ==
In Southern California, Laura hired Amanda as a "love decoy" to test her fiancé, Joe, and determines to punish him for flirting with her. Amanda meets Joe at a motel and feigns interest in BDSM; she leaves him in his underwear, wrists and ankles cuffed to the bedframe. Laura then enters, prepared to cut off his genitals as revenge, but stops as he rapidly switches from denial of an affair to an empty apology for cheating on her; declaring him immoral, she leaves.

Meanwhile, crooks Bobby Ray and Leon steal equipment and drug precursors from a meth lab and kidnap drug chemist Dot. Elsewhere, home builder Marvin has been watching over junkie Natalie; he and his employee Jack find her lying outdoors and take her to a motel to rest. Bobby Ray goes to Natalie's home, intending to rebuild the meth lab in her garage and keep her addicted for sex. He leaves Dot chained by her ankle, but she escapes by cutting her heel with the edge of a crumpled beer can. Snake enthusiast Jerry finds her limping, treats her injury, and they fall in love and impulsively marry. They each take antivenom and consummate their marriage by having sex in an empty swimming pool used as a snake pit for Jerry's rattlesnakes.

Marvin leaves for his apartment and Natalie awakens, takes meth, and talks with Jack which transitions into rough casual sex. They are interrupted by Joe's cries from the adjoining motel room; Jack frees him. Meanwhile, Marvin discovers that his apartment has been ransacked by Bobby Ray and Leon, who beat him for Natalie's location but stop after he offers to pay them $200,000 to leave her alone. They start driving to the bank with Marvin in the trunk, but learn of Natalie's motel room and force their way inside. Jack hits Bobby Ray with a golf club, takes his gun, and they exchange gunfire. Bobby Ray and Leon withdraw to the parking lot, where their car breaks down. Amanda offers to give them a jump start, and Bobby Ray fools her into believing that Marvin is agoraphobic, and manages to get Amanda's phone number. Meanwhile, Leon gets Marvin to agree to help him double cross Bobby Ray.

While driving around the motel, Bobby Ray sees Jack and Natalie and shoots at them, but hits Joe. Jack and Natalie search for Marvin, who is not answering his phone, and discuss the possibility that Marvin is Natalie's father. Jack reveals that Marvin speaks highly of Natalie's mother, who abandoned her when she was six, and believes he was in love with her. Joe awakens in an ambulance, convinced that Laura is trying to kill him. He finds her and they argue, and Laura regrets her actions and apologizes, stating that her jealousy makes it difficult for her to trust people. Joe states that he is still in love with her and they reconcile.

At the bank's parking lot, after getting the $200,000, Leon shoots Bobby Ray in the head and leaves him for dead. Leon explains to Marvin that he will use the money to open a strip club. Having survived the gunshot, Bobby Ray treats his wound then goes to Natalie's home, believing that she was behind Leon's betrayal. While he shoots at Natalie, Jack stabs him in the head with a knife. Still alive, Bobby Ray hitches a ride with a middle-aged couple who agree to get him fast food on the way to the hospital.

Marvin, Jack and Natalie have breakfast together. Marvin admits that he is not sure if he is Natalie's father, but gives her a four-year-old postcard from her mother in Ecuador. In it, her mother asks Marvin to take care of Natalie and never say anything about her, explaining: "It's too late and much too complicated." However, Marvin encourages Natalie to find her mother, believing that they both need closure over the abandonment. Marvin then announces that he is retiring from construction and is ready to invest in Jack's "wacky scheme" which cannot be any worse than Leon's.

== Cast ==
- Craig Sheffer as Bobby Ray
- Robert Loggia as Marvin
- Sadie Frost as Natalie
- John C. McGinley as Joe
- Illeana Douglas as Laura
- Sal Lopez as Leon
- Shane Brolly as Jack
- Talisa Soto as Amanda
- Lucy Liu as Dot
- James Wilder as Jerry
- Jeffrey Jones as Roger
- Julie White as Cindy

== Production, release, and reception ==
Flypaper was shot in 1997, in the period from June 9 to July 16. John C. McGinley was not cast until a week into filming. The film premiered at the American Film Market (AFM), from February 26 to March 6, 1998; it was released straight-to-DVD on June 27, 2000, by Trimark Home Video.

TV Guide called the film among the "second-rate rip-offs" of Pulp Fiction, criticizing it as merely a series of bizarre interwoven storylines without a "substantive whole" and "the highly idiosyncratic worldview that makes Quentin Tarantino's films so singular". Conversely, DVD Talk "very highly recommended" both the DVD and the film, whose outlandish set pieces they said give it "a tremendously high replay value" on video that the disc should be worth purchasing despite its scant bonus materials typical of Trimark releases.

In 2011, Total Film ranked Lucy Liu and James Wilder's sex scene in a water-free pool filled with rattlesnakes as one of the "50 Worst Movie Sex Scenes", advising audiences to look away when Liu and Wilder "copulate as narked snakes bite their naked bods".

== See also ==
- Tarantinoesque film
