= Deadly Virtues =

Deadly Virtues: Love.Honour.Obey.
- Directed by: Ate de Jong
- Written by: Mark Rogers
- Starring: Edward Akrout; Matt Barber; Megan Maczko
- Cinematography: Zoran Veljkovic
- Edited by: Jason Rayment
- Music by: Fons Merkies
- Production companies: Mulholland Pictures BV; Raindance Raw Talent; Templeheart Films
- Distributed by: A-Film Benelux (Netherlands); Monster Pictures (Australia)
- Release date: 11 April 2014 (Imagine Film Festival)
- Running time: 87 minutes
- Countries: United Kingdom; Netherlands
- Language: English

Deadly Virtues: Love.Honour.Obey. is a 2014 horror thriller film directed by Ate de Jong. The film had its world premiere on 11 April 2014 at the Imagine Film Festival and stars Matt Barber and Megan Maczko as a husband and wife that find themselves at the mercy of a sadistic intruder.

== Plot ==
Tom (Matt Barber) and Alison (Megan Maczko) are a married couple having sex when Aaron (Edward Akrout) breaks into their house and assaults them. When they come to, Alison is tied up in a shibari position and suspended from the ceiling in the kitchen while Tom is about to be bound by Aaron in the bathroom. As events progress, Aaron's actions grow increasingly more violent and dangerous and things come to the surface that shows that Tom and Alison are both hiding secrets.

== Cast ==
- Edward Akrout as Aaron
- Matt Barber as Tom
- Megan Maczko as Alison
- Helen Bradbury as Sarah
- Sadie Frost as Beautiful Woman

== Reception ==
Critical reception for Deadly Virtues: Love.Honour.Obey. has been positive and Ain't It Cool News remarked that due to the film's graphic nature concerning sex, violence, and BDSM, the film will not be for everyone and that "It is extremely hard to watch in places and the politically correct lobby will undoubtedly be horrified by some of it, but that is the point. The film’s intention is to use a cheap genre staple to show how we allow ourselves to become party to violence." Screen Daily praised the movie for its acting, writing saying "When the shocks stop and the audience finally gets to catch a breath, it becomes apparent how great the acting is by the two-and-a-half leads." Starburst and Scream also wrote favorable reviews, with Starbust stating "A film as hypnotic as it is distasteful, Deadly Virtues certainly bears checking out. Like the art of bondage, it's not for everyone, but those who can appreciate such things should enjoy it. Deadly or otherwise, it does have its virtues."

== See also ==
- List of films featuring home invasions
