= Magic Hunter =

- Directed by: Ildikó Enyedi
- Written by: Ildikó Enyedi; László Révész
- Starring: Gary Kemp; Sadie Frost
- Cinematography: Tibor Máthé
- Music by: Gregorio Paniagua
- Release date: 1995
- Language: English

Magic Hunter (Hungarian: Bűvös vadász, German: Freischütz) is a 1994 Hungarian-Swiss-French fantasy film written and directed by Ildikó Enyedi and loosely inspired by the opera Der Freischütz.

The film was entered into the main competition at the 51st edition of the Venice Film Festival.

== Plot ==
An audience sits in a theater when air raid siren suddenly sounds. A young girl is frightened by the commotion, and her mother comforts her by telling the legend of a magic hunter who made a deal with the devil to always hit his target, only to be deceived by the evil spirit, unaware that the devil always chooses the final target.

Some time later, in Budapest circa 1994, Max (Gary Kemp), a professional police sniper, observes a dangerous criminal holding Max's colleague hostage through the scope of his rifle. After receiving clearance to open fire, Max waits for the right moment and shoots, but misses his mark. The hostage is critically wounded, while the target escapes the scene.

Overwhelmed by deep guilt over the incident, Max loses his self-confidence and must prove his fitness for duty following his professional mistake. At a qualification shooting test, Max scores poorly, but his colleague Kaspar (Péter Vallai) offers him a set of experimental new bullets, after which Max hits the bullseyes repeatedly.

Having passed the test, Max receives a new assignment: to provide undercover protection for a Russian chess player named Maxim (Aleksandr Kaidanovsky), who is believed by the police to be the target of assassination plot. However, Max's self-doubt persists, and he asks Kaspar to supply him with the same experimental bullets for the mission. Kaspar agrees, on the condition that Max owes him a favor in return.

Before starting his new assignment, Max tests the bullets in a deserted place and discovers that they possess extraordinary power – it never misses the chosen target – though he carelessly thinks little of it. He returns home to his beloved wife, Eva (Sadie Frost), to get some sleep before the demanding day ahead. Eva feels an inexplicable unease for Max'safety and notices strange metal heel plates with intricate patterns on her husband's boots.

The assignment proceeds smoothly for Max, although Kaspar demands the return of the unused bullets, leaving Max only a single, final bullet to complete the mission. Max grows increasingly emotionally distant from Eva, who coincidentally meets the Russian chess player Maxim while walking in the park with her daughter. A romantic connection develops between them, placing Max in the precarious position of a jealous husband forced to protect the man courting his wife.

Soon after, finding Maxim and Eva talking in the ground-floor lobby of their apartment building, Max politely invites him in for coffee, where, with the help of Eva – who speaks a little Russian – he explains the true purpose of his presence. Maxim expresses his gratitude for the protection, and the two men head out to a nearby cofé, leaving Eva home alone. As they sit down at a table, Max spots the barrel of a rifle aimed at Maxim, instantly draws his pistol, and pulls the trigger with Kaspar's final bullet. The fired bullet crosses paths with the person Max loves most in the world – Eva, who is rushing toward them to deliver an urgent message received via the phone. Only divine intervention saves Max from making a second terrible mistake in his life.

== Cast ==
- Gary Kemp as Max
- Sadie Frost as Eva
- Alexander Kaidanovsky as Maxim
- Péter Vallai as Kaspar
- Mathias Gnädinger as Police Chief
- Alexandra Wasscher as Lili
- Ildikó Tóth as Lina
- Natalie Conde as Virgin Mary
- Zoltán Gera as Shoemaker
- Philippe Duclos as Monk
- Andor Lukáts as One-Eyed Monk

== Reception ==
Film critic Stephen Holden described it as "an unwieldy stylistic hybrid of narrative film making and arty montage" and as "klutzy and vague in its symbolic connections". Deseret News' critic Jeff Vice noted that "Enyedi has an interesting visual style, but she's too busy to concentrate on the storyline". According to Barbara Shulgasser, "Enyedi's visuals, shot by Tibor Mathe, are often beautiful enough to distract you from narrative failings".
