= Presence of Mind =

- Directed by: Antoni Aloy
- Written by: Antoni Aloy; Barbara Gogny; Mitch Brian
- Based on: The Turn of the Screw by Henry James
- Produced by: Enrique Cerezo
- Starring: Sadie Frost; Lauren Bacall; Harvey Keitel; Jude Law
- Cinematography: Antoni Aloy; David Carretero
- Edited by: Bela María da Costa; Richard Halsey
- Music by: Ángel Illarramendi; Robb Navrides
- Production company: Enrique Cerezo PC
- Distributed by: Cargo Films; Columbia TriStar Films de España S.A.
- Release dates: September 1999 (Deauville Film Festival); April 20, 2001 (Spain)
- Running time: 94 minutes
- Countries: Spain; United States
- Language: English
- Budget: $3,000,000 (est.)

Presence of Mind (Spanish: El celo) is a 1999 Spanish-American drama film directed by Antoni Aloy and starring Sadie Frost, Lauren Bacall, Harvey Keitel, and Jude Law. The film is based on the 1898 novella The Turn of the Screw by Henry James.

== Synopsis ==
A woman is hired to watch over two recently orphaned children, Flora and her brother Miles (played by Nilo Mur). The woman starts seeing ghosts and the children begin some very peculiar and disturbing behavior.

== Cast ==
- Sadie Frost as Governess
- Lauren Bacall as Mado Remei
- Ella Jones as Flora
- Nilo Zimmerman as Miles
- Harvey Keitel as The Master
- Agustí Villaronga as Fosc
- Dayna Danika as Miss Jessel
- Jude Law as Secretary
- Jack Taylor as Father
- Luz Fortuny as Aunt

== Production ==
The film was produced by Enrique Cerezo Producciones Cinematográficas, with the association of TVE and Canal+. Frost has described the filming as intense due to the needs of the role of the Governess and having to be in every scene. Filming took place at the Raixa Estate in Mallorca, Spain on a budget of $3 to 5 million and took 29 days to complete. It marked Aloy's feature film directing debut. Aloy has stated that he wanted the film to focus on "the sentimental bonds that are established between the governess and the child".

== Release ==
Presence of Mind released in September 1999. It screened at the 48th San Sebastián International Film Festival in 2000. It was also released in Spain as El celo. The film was screened as part of the Cinema d'Autor a l'Augusta at the University of the Balearic Islands in 2009.

== Reception ==
Critical reception has been mixed. Variety reviewed the film, writing that "Everything that's subtle and open to interpretation in James' novel of evil, possession and ghosts is lurid and obvious here, with a star turn by Sadie Frost that's unauthoritative to say the least and arch support from Lauren Bacall that gives the drama a ripple of unintentionally camp humor." Sight & Sound was also dismissive, as they felt that "as a measure of how James' text can be milked for terrible gothic grandstanding, Presence of Mind was exemplary." The New York Times also noted that "it seems to want the distinction of being the most uncomfortable ''Screw'' adaptation."

Philip Horne was more favorable, calling it "impressively atmospheric, and successfully unsettling".

== See also ==
- List of ghost films
