= Diamond Skulls =

- Directed by: Nick Broomfield
- Written by: Nick Broomfield; Tim Rose Price
- Produced by: Tim Bevan; Jane Fraser
- Starring: Gabriel Byrne; Amanda Donohoe; Michael Hordern; Judy Parfitt
- Cinematography: Michael Coulter
- Edited by: Rodney Holland
- Music by: Hans Zimmer
- Production company: Working Title Films
- Release date: September 1989 (London Film Festival)
- Running time: 100 minutes
- Country: U.K.
- Language: English
- Budget: $1.5 million

Diamond Skulls (also known as Dark Obsession) is a British 1989 thriller directed by Nick Broomfield who also co-wrote with Tim Rose-Price. An established documentary filmmaker, this is Broomfield's first work of fiction. It is produced by Tim Bevan and Jane Fraser and stars Amanda Donohoe, Gabriel Byrne and Struan Rodger and has a music score by Hans Zimmer. It includes the last film performance of Ian Carmichael.

== Plot ==
Lord Hugo Bruckton is a young Englishman who is the heir to a vast fortune. He is married to Ginny, who seems devoted and loyal to him, and they have a young son. But Hugo is haunted by jealousy, for he imagines Ginny in the arms of a colleague. He begins to spy on her and goes into a rage over her suspected infidelity. One night, after a social gathering with members of his old British Army regiment, Hugo and his friends go out for a drive through London. He accidentally runs over a woman, who dies at the scene. All but one of his friends urge Hugo to drive on. In his drunk state of mind, Hugo had imagined himself running over Ginny.

Over the next few days, a psychological war ensues. Peter, Hugo's business associate, wants to use the cover-up to leverage power over the estate. Jamie, who's dating Hugo's sister, wants to go to the police to report it. Hugo's family closes ranks as Ginny and the rest side with Hugo, who fears that his arrest and imprisonment will ruin the family's reputation. As the police investigation closes in on Hugo, the power struggle leads to deadly consequences. When Jamie reports the hit-and-run to the police, they incorrectly assume that Jamie committed the hit-and-run because the car involved was registered to him.

Jamie later crashes a former dinner party that Hugo is throwing at Crewne Hall, the family estate, to try to persuade him to come forward to admit their involvement with the woman's death. But instead, Hugo and Peter, unwilling to give up their livelihoods and to make sure Jamie will never talk to the police or anyone else about the accident ever again, murder him and have their Army regiment colleagues arrange it to look like a suicide--and that Jamie had killed himself out of guilt--by throwing his dead body off a seaside cliff. The police close the case, and the amoral Hugo and all of his friends literally get away with everything as they continue their sordid and unwholesome life undisturbed.

== Cast ==
- Amanda Donohoe as Ginny Bruckton
- Gabriel Byrne as Lord Hugo Bruckton
- Struan Rodger as Peter Eggleton
- Douglas Hodge as Jamie Skinner
- Ralph Brown as Jack
- Peter Sands as Colonel
- David Delve as Alec
- Alexander Clempson as Edward
- Catherine Livesey as Nanny
- Michael Hordern as Lord Crewne
- Ian Carmichael as Exeter
- Matthew Marsh as Raul
- Judy Parfitt as Lady Crewne
- Sadie Frost as Rebecca
- Edward Burnham as John the Gardener
- Phyllida Hewat as Lady Castlemere
- Patrick Field as Detective 1
- Jay Benedict as Joe
- Eiji Kusuhara as Ewo Nagasaky
- Robin Summers as Detective 2
- William Hoyland as Inspector Orchard

== Production ==
In this movie Amanda Donohoe was faced with the added pressure of simulating sexual intercourse with another actor in front of director Nick Broomfield, with whom she was developing a romantic relationship. "I left the filming of that scene until the end of shooting," said Broomfield in reference to the controversial sex scene between Donohoe and Gabriel Byrne.

== Rating ==
Diamond Skulls received an NC-17 rating upon its release in the United States during June 1991.

== Reception ==
Diamond Skulls received generally mixed reviews: the film carries a 36% approval rating on Rotten Tomatoes based on 11 reviews, with an average of 5.9/10. The film was given two thumbs up by Siskel & Ebert.

In the New York Times review Diamond Skulls; Aristocracy When It Thinks No One is Looking, Janet Maslin considered that "rarely does a documentary film maker make the transition to fiction as adroitly as Nicholas Broomfield has in Dark Obsession, a psychological thriller displaying a documentarian's fascination for small, telling details." Maslin also praised "an eerie score by Hans Zimmer, a chilling performance by Struan Rodger as Sir Hugo's cold blooded business associate and the unremarked upon inclusion of many odd bits of traditionalism that have presumably made men like Sir Hugo what they are".
