= Anthony Norman Davis =

Royal Air Force officer (1918–1988)

- Born: 14 August 1918; Farnham, Surrey, England
- Died: 1988
- Military career
- Allegiance: United Kingdom
- Branch: British Army (1938–1940); Royal Air Force (1940–1972)
- Service years: 1938–1972
- Rank: Air Commodore
- Service number: 43544
- Unit: Royal Engineers
- Commands: No. 16 Squadron RAF
- Conflicts: Second World War
- Awards: Distinguished Service Order; Distinguished Flying Cross

Air Commodore Anthony Norman Davis, DSO, DFC (14 August 1918 – 1988) was a Royal Air Force officer who served as a pilot during the Second World War.

== Early life and career ==
Born in the Farnham area of Surrey, Davis was the son of Lieutenant Colonel H. J. N. Davis. He graduated from the Royal Military Academy, Woolwich as a second lieutenant in the Royal Engineers of the British Army. In 1940, he transferred to the Royal Air Force (RAF) as a pilot.

== RAF career ==
Davis served in the Second World War. He was awarded the Distinguished Flying Cross as a flight lieutenant in 1943, and received the Distinguished Service Order (DSO) as an acting squadron leader in 1945. The citation for his DSO was published in the London Gazette of 24 July 1945, reading:

Sqn Ldr. Davis has been engaged continuously on photographic reconnaissance work. He has proved himself a skillful and courageous pilot who has never failed to obtain excellent photographs even in the face of intense opposition. On four occasions he has been attacked by formations of enemy aircraft, but he has always outmaneuvered his assailants successfully. On one of his missions over the Dortmund-Ems canal his petrol tank was hit by anti-aircraft fire. Despite the loss of fuel and damage sustained, Sqn. Ldr. Davis continued with his allotted task and secured some fine results. He has commanded his squadron for a period of eight months, during which time he has displayed exceptional qualities of determination, leadership, and judgment.

When Davis announced his engagement to Dominique Gauquié in 1950 he was the air attaché in Budapest. In 1963, he was promoted air commodore as the air attaché in Moscow.

Davis appeared on British television in the 1970s as the Ministry of Defence spokesman on Unidentified Flying Objects.

His grandson is the Franco-British actor Edward Akrout.
