= Freya Allan =

English actress (born 2001)

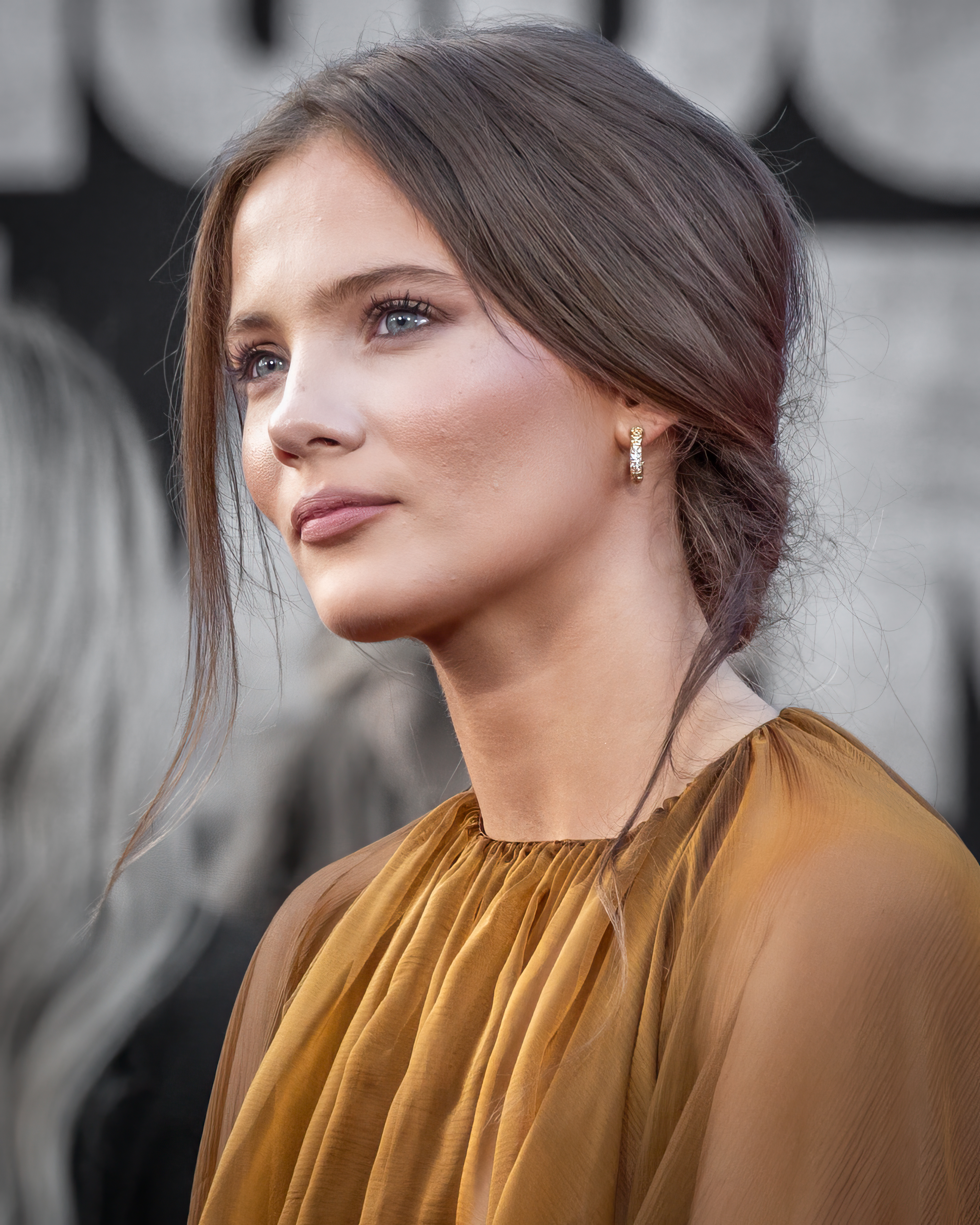
- Freya Allan at the world premiere of Kingdom of the Planet of the Apes, Hollywood 2024
- Born: 6 September 2001 (age 25); Oxford, Oxfordshire, England
- Education: Headington School
- Occupation: Actress
- Years active: 2017–present
- Known for: The Witcher

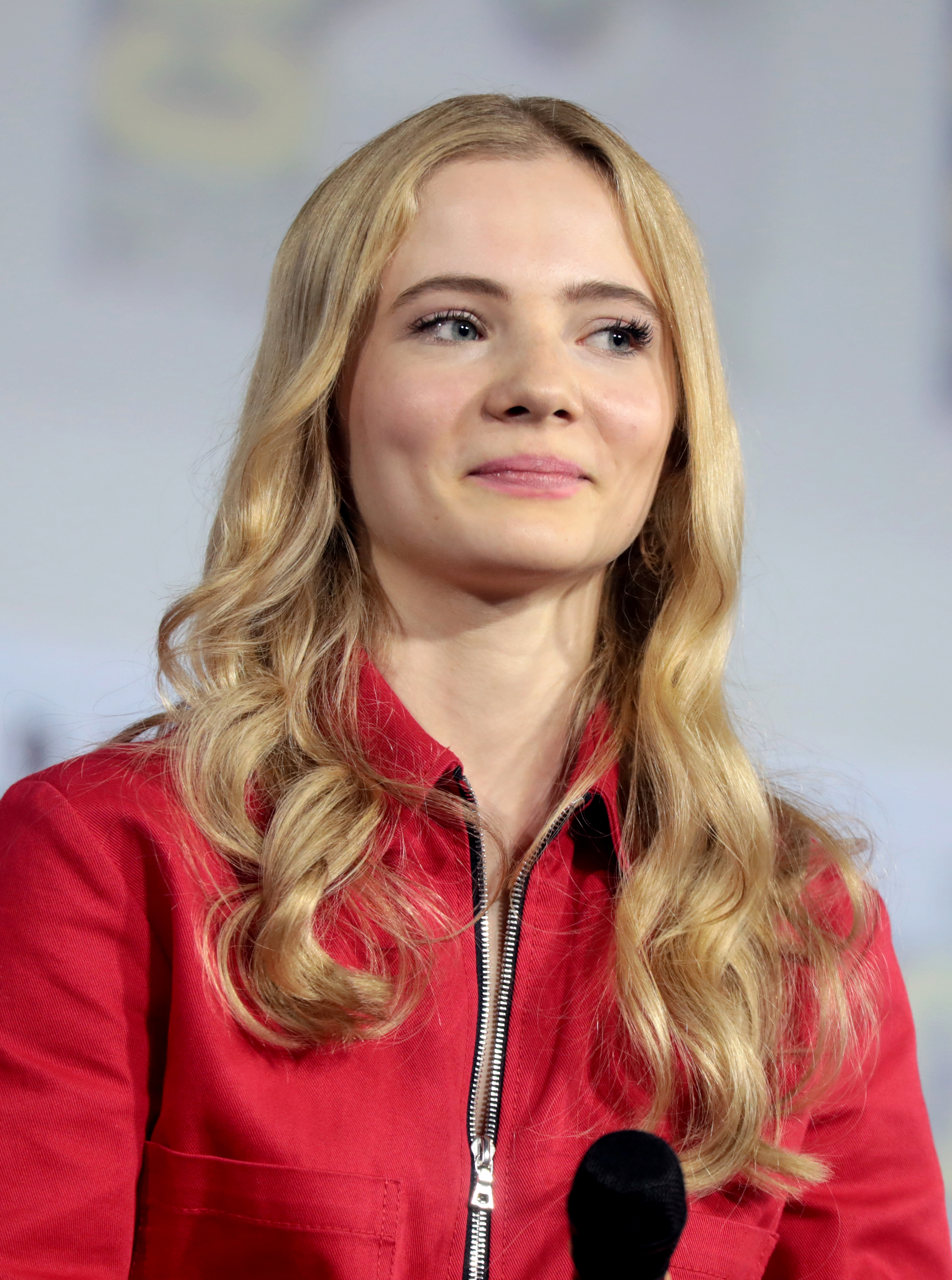
Allan at the 2019 San Diego Comic-Con

Freya Allan (born 6 September 2001) is an English actress. She is best known for her role as Princess Cirilla of Cintra in the Netflix series The Witcher, for which she was nominated for two Saturn Awards, and as Mae in the 2024 action film Kingdom of the Planet of the Apes. She has also appeared in the 2021 film Gunpowder Milkshake and the AMC series Into the Badlands.

== Early life and education ==
Allan was born on 6 September 2001 in Oxford, Oxfordshire, England, and attended Headington School in Oxford. Her parents separated when she was one and she lived with her mother in Australia and the French Pyrenees, where she attended a French-language school before returning to Oxford; she now lives in London. She has a younger half-brother and half-sister.

At school Allan studied drama and ballet and was part of the company in a touring production of Rapunzel at age eleven. She starred in two short films, Bluebird and The Christmas Tree produced by National Film and Television School and later performed the part of Linda in the short film Captain Fierce, produced by Bournemouth Film School.

== Career ==
Allan played a minor role in the first episode of the 2019 BBC drama The War of the Worlds. The same year she appeared on the front cover of Schön! magazine, whilst they were celebrating their 10th anniversary.

Since 2019, Allan has starred as Princess Ciri alongside Henry Cavill and Anya Chalotra in the Netflix fantasy drama series The Witcher, adapted by Lauren Schmidt Hissrich from the book series by Andrzej Sapkowski. Originally cast as a one-off character before being recast as Ciri, she lived in Budapest, Hungary for eight months during the filming of the first series. Allan reprised the role of Ciri for the second series, which was produced in London in early 2020 and released in 2021 on Netflix. The third season began in June 2023 and saw Ciri training to become a warrior, for which Allan was trained in sword fighting. Allan was nominated for Saturn Award for Best Performance by a Younger Actor in 2021 and 2024 for her work on The Witcher. She reprised her role for the fourth season and is set to appear in the fifth and final season. She also reprised her role as Ciri in The Witcher special The Rats: A Witcher Tale.

In 2021, Allan played the lead role in the horror film Baghead, directed by Alberto Corredor and co-starring Ruby Barker. In 2023, Allan filmed Kingdom of the Planet of the Apes in Australia, playing human character, Mae. Acknowledging the physicality of the role, Allan opted to perform some of her own stunts. Kingdom of the Planet of the Apes was released on 10 May 2024 and went on to gross $397 million at the worldwide box office.

Allan was cast in director Janell Shirtcliff's horror film Triton, which wrapped filming in Greece in early 2024. In 2025 she was reported to be attached to play Marianne Faithfull in a biographical film of the singer.

== Filmography ==
Key
†	Denotes projects that have not yet been released

=== Film ===
Year	Title	Role	Notes	Ref.
2021	Gunpowder Milkshake	Young Sam		
2023	Baghead	Iris Lark		
2024	Kingdom of the Planet of the Apes	Mae		
2025	The Rats: A Witcher Tale	Ciri	Netflix Television special	
TBA	Triton †	Helle	Post-production	
TBA	Faithfull †	Marianne Faithfull	Pre-production	
TBA	Black Palace †		Post-production	

=== Television ===
Year	Title	Role	Notes	Ref.
2018	Into the Badlands	Young Minerva	Episode: "Carry Tiger to Mountain"	
2019	The War of the Worlds	Mary	Episode: "Revolution"	
2019–present	The Witcher	Ciri	Series regular; 32 episodes	
2020	The Third Day	Kail	Series regular; 5 episodes	

== Awards and nominations ==
Year	Award	Category	Nominated work	Result	Ref.
2021	Saturn Awards	Best Younger Performer in a Television Series	The Witcher	Nominated	
2024	Saturn Awards	Best Younger Performer in a Television Series	The Witcher	Nominated	
2025	Saturn Awards	Best Younger Performer in a Film	Kingdom of the Planet of the Apes	Nominated	
