= Carreau du Temple =

Market in Paris

Coordinates: 48°51′51″N 2°21′45″E

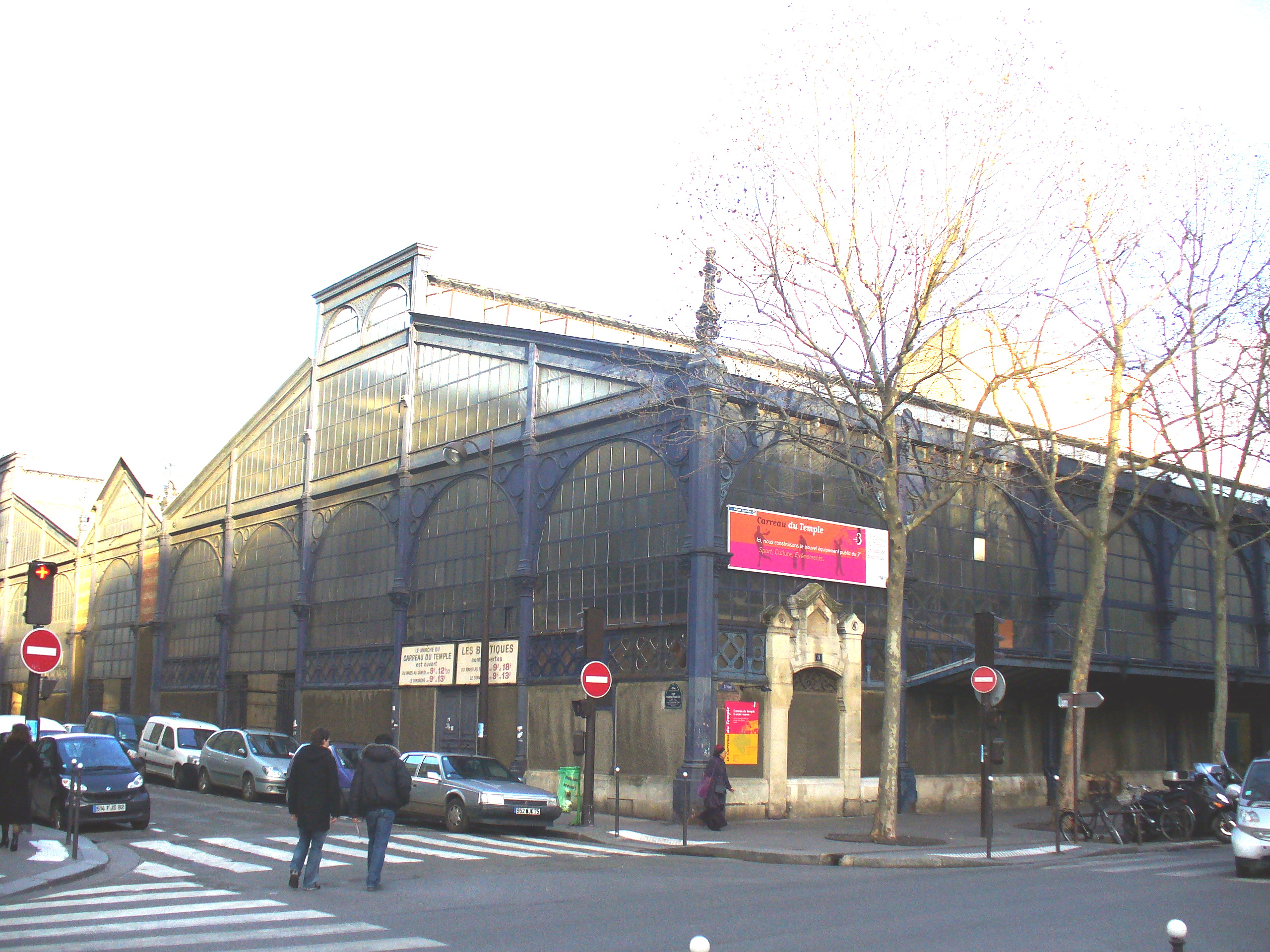
The Carreau du Temple

The Carreau du Temple is a covered market in the 3rd arrondissement of Paris, built in 1863. As part of a public consultation exercise undertaken in 2004, the local population voted that the Carreau should be redeveloped as polyvalent public space. The Carreau is scheduled to reopen in 2013.

The carreau is situated near the former site of the Temple, the medieval enclosure of the Knights Templar, which gained notoriety as the prison where the royal family were held during the French Revolution.

In 1811, a wooden structure was erected on the site to house a permanent market, which was replaced by the current cast iron, brick and glass structure in 1863. The market specialised in selling clothes, but has declined in popularity.

Major renovation of the Carreau du Temple is due to be completed by the end of 2013. During the work, the building was stripped to its metallic structure. Various facilities will be created below ground level and on the main floor. Among the new facilities is a 250-seat auditorium and 1,800 square metres (19,000 sq ft) of multipurpose space at ground level, and below ground level, sport and cultural facilities, including a recording studio. The capacity of the renovated building will be 2800 persons.

During the renovation of the Carreau, the remains of a Templar cemetery were found.
