= Raff Law =

English actor, musician and model

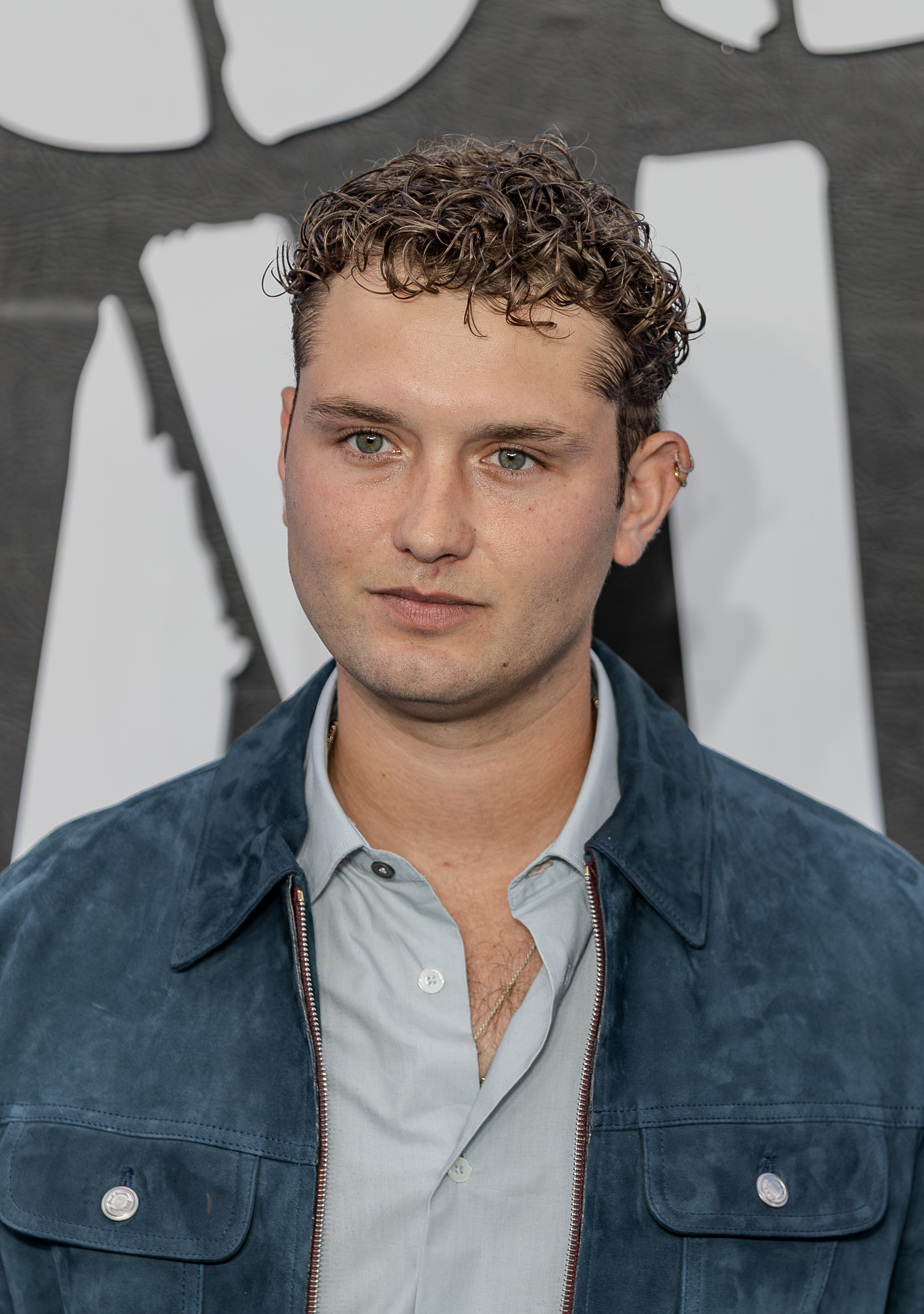
- Law in 2025
- Born: Rafferty Jellicoe Frost Law; 6 October 1996 (age 30); London, England
- Education: Bedales School
- Occupation: Actor
- Years active: 2014–present
- Parents: Jude Law (father); Sadie Frost (mother)
- Relatives: Iris Law (sister); Natasha Law (aunt)

Rafferty "Raff" Jellicoe Frost Law (born 6 October 1996) is an English actor.

== Early life ==
Law attended Bedales School in Hampshire. He appeared in his first play aged five or six in a school production of Pinocchio. He also played Long John Silver in a production of Treasure Island.

== Career ==
=== Music ===
Law was in the band Outer Stella Overdrive with Kelvin Bueno, who was introduced to him by his sister Iris as “they had such similar taste in music”. The band expanded to include keyboardist Amin El Makkawi, and drummer Ruby Albarn, nephew of Damon Albarn. The band released their debut single State Your Name, in 2018. Law and Bueno would share lyric writing duties. They released their debut EP Clout & Self Doubt in 2021.

=== Modelling ===
Law walked for DKNY in 2014 whilst still a teenager. His first magazine cover was in 2016 for L’Officiel Hommes Netherlands. Law walked for Dolce and Gabbana during Milan Fashion Week. He has also worked with the likes of Missoma, Valentino, Mulberry, and Brioni.

=== Acting ===
Law appears in The Hat, a 2020 short film with his father Jude Law, which was shot on an iPhone during the COVID-19 pandemic lockdown. It has a musical score by Pete Townshend and raised money for the Teenage Cancer Trust and Teen Cancer America. The short won the Spirit of The Festival Award at the Raindance Film Festival in November 2020. It was the first time Law and his father had appeared on film together.

Law appeared as Oliver Twist in the 2021 film Twist, a modern re-telling of the Dickens tale, with Michael Caine and Rita Ora. In April 2021, he was cast as Sgt. Ken Lemmons in the Apple TV+ series Masters of the Air as part of an ensemble cast including Austin Butler. He is set to appear in I Let You In, a virtual reality 6-episode series based on the Talk to Me universe, which is set to debut on Meta Platforms in 2027.

== Personal life ==
He is the son of English actors Jude Law and Sadie Frost. He has a sister named Iris, a brother named Rudy, a maternal half-brother and four paternal half-siblings.

== Filmography ==
=== Film ===
Key
†	Denotes films that have not yet been released

Year	Title	Role	Notes
2021	Twist	Oliver Twist	As Rafferty Law
2026	How to Make a Killing	Taylor Redfellow	

=== Television ===
Key
†	Denotes television productions that have not yet been released

Year	Title	Role	Notes
2024	Masters of the Air	Sgt. Ken Lemmons	Miniseries, 7 episodes
2026	Kill Jackie	Sean	

=== Virtual reality series ===
Year	Title	Role	Notes
2027	I Let You In	TBA	Post-production
