= Crime in Thailand =

- Homicide: 4.8 (2011)
- Assault: 28.0 (2023)
- Burglary: 4.4 (2016)
- Theft: 79.5 (2024)
- Fraud: 49.6 (2024)
- Corruption: 16.9 (2023)
- Bribery: 0.0 (2023)
- Money laundering: 2.3 (2024)
- Rape: 5.6 (2023)
- Sexual violence: 7.5 (2023)
- reported per 100,000 inhabitants

Crime in Thailand has been a defining issue in the country for decades, inspiring years of policy and international criticism. Drug use and corruption make up the majority of the crime in Thailand and due to this, many Thai administrations attempted to curtail the drug trade, most notably Thaksin Shinawatra with the 2003 War on Drugs. Since 2003 crime has been decreasing with the crime rate decreasing from 9.97 to 2.58. Despite this, juvenile delinquency has been increasing in recent years. The Murder rate In Thailand per 100,000 populations was 1.84 in 2021, 1.9 in 2022, 2.2 in 2023 and 2.6 in 2024.

Graph showing homicide rate in Thailand from 1995 to 2015

In November 2015, The New York Times reported that in the fiscal year ending September 2015, the national police have seen a surge in thefts, burglaries, and robberies, more than 75,557 thefts and other property crimes in the fiscal year, 10.5 percent higher than the previous year. Violent crime was up 8.6 percent during the same period. These figures have been contested by the police and by Amorn Wanichwiwatana, a criminologist at Chulalongkorn University, who said he was not aware of any significant uptick in crime since the military came to power. "I don’t think that’s the case. It's not possible," he said of the 60 percent increase reported by the Times. Crime statistics from the Royal Thai Police (RTP) show a statistically negligible increase of 1.9 percent over the same period, with 920 additional crimes reported after an overall decline since 2009.

Augmenting the crime prevention efforts of the RTP, there are an estimated 3,000-4,000 security companies in Thailand, deploying between 400,000-500,000 security guards nationwide.

== By location ==
Much of Thailand's crime is in urban areas where tourists congregate as they are easy targets, as well as where rampant prostitution and human trafficking feeds their vices. The prime areas of drug abuse are Bangkok, Phuket, and Pattaya, but not limited to these areas. The prime transit corridor for drugs entering northern Thailand is from the Golden Triangle, as well as from ethnically divided rebel-controlled areas within the fragmented state of Myanmar, especially Shan State. Thailand's international ports, like Laem Chabang near Pattaya, and Suvarnabhumi International Airport, have seen a number of African and former Commonwealth of Independent States gangs, as well as other transnational gangs and drug mules involved in the trade.

== Crime by type ==
=== Drug trade ===
Thailand has a growing problem of drugs and the violence associated with it. The drugs involved range from the traditional, kratom, to ya ba, opium from Myanmar, and local herbal medicines.

A previous attempt to control the drug trade by declaring the 2003 War on Drugs, was met with allegations of Thaksin-allied, politically-inspired targeted killings, quotas of dead drug traffickers, and the targeting of innocent victims. Methamphetamine is so widely abused that animals, such as gibbons, slow lorises, and elephants "are force-fed stimulants to make them work longer hours, sedated to allow petting and entertain tourists."

In May 2012, it was discovered that nearly 50 million legal pseudoephedrine tablets had been stolen from Thai hospitals. Two billion more tablets were smuggled in from Taiwan and South Korea, with forged documents showing two Thai companies importing some eight billion more. They had reported the drugs to be imports of electronics and automobile parts. Thailand responded by close monitoring of the sale and distribution of pseudoephedrine.

A United Nations report on the situation in Thailand states, "Many of those now incarcerated in Thailand's prisons are likely to be low-level traders and drug users, as they are more easy targets for police, rather than large scale traffickers and organised criminals".

In October 2021, the police from Laos seized more than 55 million amphetamine tablets and over 1.5 tons of crystal methamphetamine. The United Nations stated that the operation was the Asia's largest single drug bust in history.

According to research from Chiang Mai University, drug use more than tripled after 5 years in Thailand's eight northernmost provinces in 2024. This spike coincides with the 2021 Myanmar Civil War; many of the low-level couriers and traffickers are ethnic Lahu people.

=== Animal abuse ===
Animal abuse in Thailand is widespread, including elephants tortured for tourism, killing elephants for their tusks, smuggling them from Myanmar, exploiting elephants in cities, and trading in animal parts.

=== Rape ===
In 2013, 87 women came forward daily to report sexual abuse or to seek counseling as a result of sexual abuse in Thailand, with most offenders known to the victim. Police refused to accept many complaints, giving excuses such as "political unrest". The youngest victim was aged one year and nine months and eldest was 85. The youngest offender was a 10-year-old boy who took part in a gang-rape and the eldest was an 85-year-old man who molested a young girl.

The number of rape cases in Thailand in 2015 has been reported as 3,240, with 2,109 reported in 2016. The Royal Thai Police reported 2,535 cases in 2017. According to the Women and Men Progressive Movement Foundation (WMP), 53% of rape victims are raped by family members or friends. Only 38% percent of rape victims are raped by strangers.

On 27 May 2019, Thai sexual assault laws were toughened. Among other changes, sexual attacks on children younger than 13 will carry a sentence of life in prison, while penalties will double for rapists who record and share media of their crime. The new law also adds penalties for sexual crimes against men and necrophilia.

=== Fraud ===
Thailand as a major tourist destination is infamous for scams and touts. Among the most famous and lucrative are the gem scam, Thai tailor scam, and fake travel agents and Thai zig zag scam.

The boiler room scam (a fake stock trading scam) is perhaps the most publicized white-collar crime in Thailand.

Stateless persons are targeted with fake UN working rights cards.

Serious passport and identification forgery caught the attention of US authorities after the disappearance of Malaysia Airlines Flight 370. Some 259 stolen visa labels had disappeared from a Thai consulate in Malaysia in August 2013. They were used to cross the Thai border illegally. Thirty-five Iranians, one Cameroonian, 20 Nigerians, four Pakistanis, four Indians, and others from Asia made the crossing.

=== Human trafficking and prostitution ===
In 2013, the US State Department stated that Thailand faced the lowest rank (e.g. failing) in its Trafficking In Persons Report. The 2013 report stated that Thai police and immigration officials "extorted money or sex" from detainees or "sold Burmese migrants unable to pay labor brokers or sex traffickers,". According to officials from the International Labour Organization (ILO), Thailand was the only government to vote against the United Nations Forced Labour Convention at the ILO's annual ministerial conference in June 2014.

In response, Walmart and Costco retail chains in USA have dumped Charoen Pokphand as a supplier of seafood products due to suppliers that "own, operate or buy from fishing boats manned with slaves." The Thai government on 15 June 2014 caved to international pressure and explained its intention to rescind its previous ILO vote.

In 2017, a case against Charoen Pokphand was brought to trial in the Northern District of California, ultimately leading to a dismissal with prejudice.

The 2019 U.S. State Department report ranks Thailand as a Tier 2 nation. Thailand remains a destination country for sex and labor from developing nations. However for example, recent efforts to curtail exploitation include:

In 2018, the anti-money laundering office (AMLO) issued restraint and seizure orders for assets worth more than 509 million baht ($15.73 million) in trafficking cases, compared to 14 million baht ($432,770) in 2017. The government operated specialized anti-trafficking divisions within the Bangkok Criminal Court, office of the attorney general (OAG), and the Royal Thai Police (RTP). The OAG required all prosecutors to expedite the submission of trafficking cases to the Courts of Justice.

— 2019 Trafficking in Persons Report

=== Domestic violence ===
Violence against women and children has been rising in Thailand. In 2006, 13,550 cases of domestic violence against women and children were reported by Thailand's Ministry of Public Health. Between 2007 and 2015 the total number of violence victims seeking assistance at the One-Stop Crisis Centre of the Public Health Ministry totalled 207,891. Of those, 105,622 involved children those involving women amounted to 102,269. In 2016, the number of distressed women and children seeking assistance from the centre was 20,018, according to the National Economic and Social Development Board (NESDB).

=== Illegal logging ===
Governmental officials in charge of protected areas have contributed to deforestation by allowing illegal logging and illegal timber trading. King Bhumibol Adulyadej has blamed the destruction of Thailand's forested areas on the greed of some state officials. This is evident in places such as large protected swathes of northern Nan Province that were formerly covered with virgin forest and that have been deforested even while having national park status. Given that a mature, 30 year-old Siamese rosewood tree can fetch 300,000 baht on the black market, illegal logging is unlikely to disappear.

=== Foreign gangs and fugitives ===
Thailand has been described as a haven for criminals on the run from the law in their homelands. Further, foreign criminal gangs have adopted Thailand as a base of operations. A 2014 study by the Thailand Institute of Justice identified 22 separate gangs of foreigners involved in identity fraud, petty theft, and burglary. Thailand's economic reliance on tourism creates cover, crowds, and undocumented vice income, enabling foreign criminals to enter and remain in the country overstaying tourist visas. Bribery is frequently used to cement friendly relations with local officials, particularly the police. Their palms greased, police and immigration officials ignore wrongdoing. "Thailand has traditionally been one of the top source countries for extradition of criminals to the U.S.," said a March 2009 cable from the American Embassy in Bangkok obtained by WikiLeaks. "There are a number of minor reasons and one very major one why the jet-setting underground would find Thailand irresistible," according to Thailand-based British author Mr. John Burdett. "The minor ones would include guns, girls, gambling, ganja and gorgeous beaches, especially for those recently released from confinement." But, he said, what makes Thailand especially attractive, "is the ...compliant and bribable police force."

== Crime dynamics ==
=== Firearms ===
About one in ten people in Thailand legally own a gun. There are more than six million registered guns in a country with a population of 66.7 million. Small Arms Survey estimates that the total number of guns, both licit and illicit, held by Thai civilians in 2017 is 10,300,000, equating to 15.1 firearms per 100 inhabitants. Comparable figures for the other ASEAN nations are: Cambodia, 4.5 per 100 inhabitants; Philippines, 3.6; Laos, 3.0; Myanmar, 1.6; Vietnam, 1.6; Brunei, 1.4; Malaysia, 0.7; Singapore, 0.3; and Indonesia, zero.

Ownership of firearms is particularly high in the south Thailand provinces of Pattani, Yala, and Narathiwat that have witnessed significant insurgency and rebellion since 2004.

In 2016 Thailand's rate of violent gun-related deaths stood at 4.45 deaths per 100,000 inhabitants. In comparison, that of the Philippines was 7.42; the US, 3.85; Cambodia, 0.96; Myanmar, 0.56; Malaysia, 0.46; Indonesia, 0.10; and Singapore, 0.03.

Obtaining a permit to own a weapon legally in Thailand involves extensive vetting, including an interview by an Interior Ministry investigator, but a thriving black market exists to circumvent the law.

=== School violence and delinquency ===
Technical colleges for years have seen rival gang shootings at major intersections in Bangkok and elsewhere, and tends to be an urban phenomenon. In one famous case, one such shootout began in response to a "Gangnam Style" dance faceoff. One technical school student is quoted as saying, "Guns are like school supplies. On our campus, we might use a gun to protect ourselves from violent, unruly seniors. Outside, we have rival schools..."

Juvenile delinquency from 2003 to 2007 exploded, increasing some 70 percent, with both genders reporting large increases, despite the country moving up world economic rankings.

On 2 August 2008, an 18-year-old high school student in Bangkok murdered a taxi driver named Khuan Phokaeng caused by his obsession with the video game Grand Theft Auto, which the government subsequently banned from sales.

=== Prison infrastructure and corruption ===
Thailand has woefully inadequate prison infrastructure, as well as a lack of political will to deal with the exploding crime problem. In Rayong Central Prison, which was designed to house 3,000 inmates but holds 6,000, improvised rocket canisters were used to relay goods from the outside world over the top of walls into the prison. Mail sent to prisoners contained items such as mobile phones used to coordinate and organize crime outside of the prison. This situation is not unique to Rayong Prison, and is commonplace throughout Thailand.

Corrupt prison officials add to the issues of dealing with escalating crime. In one case, a prison nurse was caught dealing drugs. In a sting operation some 28 prison wardens were found to be smuggling drugs. Authorities are so corrupt or incompetent that females were found in one male cell feeding five babies. Thai authorities have responded by installing mobile phone jamming equipment, but these jammers has been proven to offer a false sense of security, as a wall crack was used to store phones where the jammers could not penetrate. Other initiatives include x-ray scanners, and installing CCTV equipment. A new super-max prison is in the planning stages.

=== Buddhist monks ===
Crime has infiltrated all components of Thai society, including Buddhist institutions. The monastic life offers a veil of legitimacy to criminal organizations. There have been a number of monks in a string of cases in recent years caught with methamphetamines, selling drugs, prostitutes, pornography, and guns, including senior monks.

One case involved two monks attempting to ditch speed pills at a police checkpoint. Another case involved a senior monk who claimed he needed money to "refurbish his temple", yet used the money for drugs and sex. Murder by clergy has been reported increasingly. There was even a case of Thai monks killing each other in the United States. There is widespread sexual assault of male novices in temples, and of mae chi (Buddhist nuns) and lay women.

== Deaths of foreigners ==
There are at least seven cases of reported murders of the foreigners on the southern island of Koh Tao in between the years of 2014-2017 with many doubts about the police investigation which was widely criticised and marked as "Incompetent at best" by the international legal and DNA forensics experts.

Although there have been crimes, Thai authorities have also had success in apprehending suspects such as in the case of two murdered backpackers and with the Albano murder.

David Miller and Hannah Witheridge, a backpacking couple from England, were murdered on the island of Ko Tao in 2014. In December 2015, two migrants from Myanmar, Zaw Lin and Wai Phyowere were found guilty and initially sentenced to death. Then 2020, after all available appeals upheld the conviction, both sentences were commuted to life imprisonment after a mass royal pardon.

In 2013 an American expat was chopped to death by a Bangkok taxi driver with a sword (Troy Lee Pilkington, who allegedly got out of the taxi and refused to pay a 51 baht ($1.60) fare). One expat writer produced a book called How Not To Get Murdered In Thailand The author mentions the case of the murdered American Troy Pilkington and noted the contrasting dangers of both taxi cabs and public transportation. Issues with taxi drivers include their alleged drug use and abuse at the hands of Chinese organized crime network which often charge them high fee to operate in the city. The taxi drivers are typically poor farmers trying to earn money for their rural families. Whatever the reasons for their demise – indeed many of the deaths are confusing or have unclear causes – Thailand has remained popular for adventures. One young English woman, Christina Annesley, was found dead on Ko Tao. Musicians at a Thailand bar stabbed an American businessman to death in front of his son, there to celebrate his birthday with his family (after an allegedly drunken argument with the band because he and his son refused to stop singing and leave the stage). Thai police arrested three musicians for the crime.

The Thai government has worked with other countries to manage crime and, for example, has a prisoner exchange agreement with Australia. In the case of Wendy Albano, India, Thailand, and the United States all worked together to find the primary suspect hiding in India. In that case that the help then U.S. Secretary of State Hillary Clinton and a U.S. senator was involved. This was in part due to difficulty in apprehending a suspect, that had fled to a different country (and thus out of the jurisdiction of a single country).

=== The case of Wendy Albano and foreigners on foreigners crime ===
Wendy Albano was an American businesswoman murdered in 2012 in a hotel room in Thailand. Authorities in the U.S. got in touch with the U.S. State department eventually leading to the arrest of a suspect hiding in India years later. U.S. Sen. Bill Nelson asked then-Secretary of State Hillary Clinton to help with the case. Senator Nelson took steps to help India and Thailand work together to solve the crime. The case made headlines in the United States and India, especially due to the involvement of a U.S. Senator and request for help from then Secretary of State Clinton.

This is the case where foreigners commit crimes against other foreigners in Thailand, in Albano's case the chief suspect was an Indian man who fled Thailand but was eventually captured in India with the help of the Indian law enforcement.

== Threatening Behavior ==
A Thai rescuer is facing threats after he exposed to the news agencies that a hospital in Bangkok refused to treat a foreigner who later died because of the delay in treatment.

== See also ==
- Firearms in Thailand
- Corruption in Thailand
- Racism and xenophobia in Thailand
- Human rights in Thailand
