= List of awards and nominations received by Phoebe Waller-Bridge =

Awards and nominations received by Phoebe Waller-Bridge
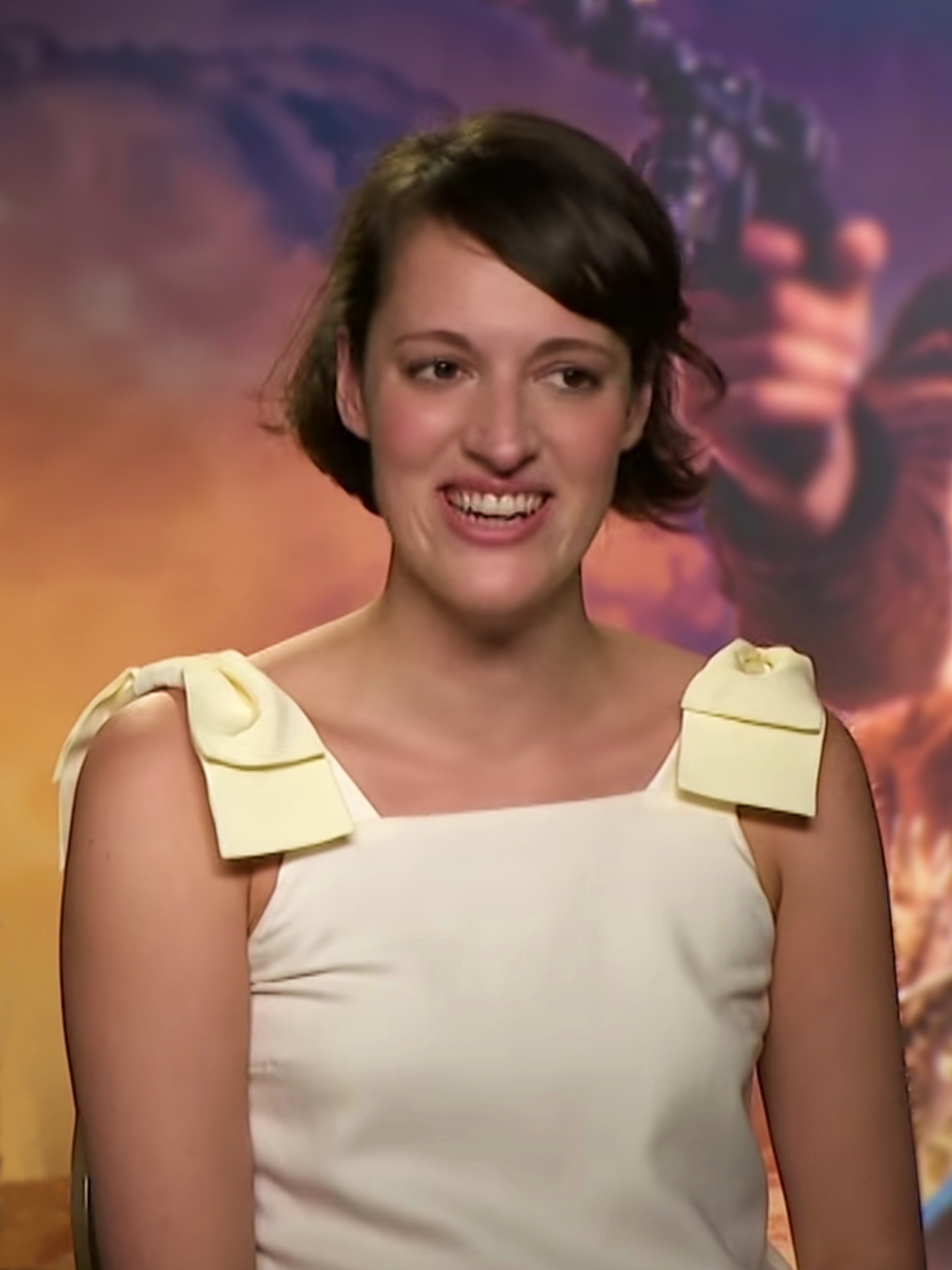
- Waller-Bridge in 2018
Awards and nominations
Award	Wins	Nominations
BAFTA Awards	1	7
Golden Globe Award	2	4
Primetime Emmy Award	3	7
Screen Actors Guild Award	1	2
Laurence Olivier Awards	0	3

Totals (Note: Certain award groups do not simply award one winner. They acknowledge several different recipients, have runners-up, and have third place. Since this is a specific recognition and is different from losing an award, runner-up mentions are considered wins in this award tally. For simplification and to avoid errors, each award in this list has been presumed to have had a prior nomination.)
- Wins: 7
- Nominations: 23

Phoebe Waller-Bridge is an English actress and writer of the stage, screen and television.

She has received numerous awards for her work on television and on the stage as an actor, writer, and producer. She has received seven Primetime Emmy Award nominations, winning three times in 2019 for Outstanding Comedy Series, Outstanding Lead Actress in a Comedy Series, and Outstanding Writing for a Comedy Series for the second season of her critically acclaimed comedy series Fleabag on Amazon Video. She was also nominated for Outstanding Writing for a Drama Series in 2018 and Outstanding Drama Series in 2019 for the BBC spy thriller series Killing Eve. She was also nominated for Outstanding Guest Actress in a Comedy Series for her performance on Saturday Night Live in 2020.

She also received four Golden Globe Award nominations winning two awards, as well as two Screen Actors Guild Award nominations winning for Outstanding Performance by a Female Actor in a Comedy Series for Fleabag in 2019. For her work on stage she has earned three Laurence Olivier Award nominations. In 2019 she earned Britannia Award for Artist of the Year. She was included in Time Magazine's 100 Most Influential People of 2020.

== Major associations ==
=== Primetime Emmy Awards ===
Year	Category	Nominated work	Result	Ref.
2018	Outstanding Writing for a Drama Series	Killing Eve	Nominated	
2019	Outstanding Comedy Series	Fleabag	Won	
2019	Outstanding Lead Actress in a Comedy Series	Fleabag	Won	
2019	Outstanding Writing for a Comedy Series	Fleabag	Won	
2019	Outstanding Drama Series	Killing Eve	Nominated	
2020	Outstanding Drama Series	Killing Eve	Nominated	
2020	Outstanding Guest Actress in a Comedy Series	Saturday Night Live	Nominated	
2025	Outstanding Narrator	Octopus!	Nominated	

=== BAFTA Awards ===
Year	Category	Nominated work	Result	Ref.
British Academy Television Awards
2017	Best Female Performance in a Comedy	Fleabag	Won	
2017	Best Scripted Comedy	Fleabag	Nominated	
2020	Best Female Performance in a Comedy	Fleabag	Nominated	
2020	Best Scripted Comedy	Fleabag	Nominated	
British Academy Television Craft Awards
2017	Best Writer – Comedy	Fleabag	Nominated	
2017	Breakthrough Talent Award	Crashing / Fleabag	Nominated	
2019	Best Writer – Drama	Killing Eve	Nominated	
2020	Best Writer – Comedy	Fleabag	Nominated	

=== Golden Globe Awards ===
Year	Category	Nominated work	Result	Ref.
2018	Best Television Series – Drama	Killing Eve	Nominated	
2019	Best Television Series – Drama	Killing Eve	Nominated	
2019	Best Television Series – Musical or Comedy	Fleabag	Won	
2019	Best Actress – Television Series Musical or Comedy	Fleabag	Won	

=== Screen Actors Guild Awards ===
Year	Category	Nominated work	Result	Ref.
2019	Outstanding Actress in a Comedy Series	Fleabag	Won	
2019	Outstanding Ensemble Cast in a Comedy Series	Fleabag	Nominated	

=== Laurence Olivier Awards ===
Year	Category	Nominated work	Result	Ref.
2014	Outstanding Achievement in Affiliate Theatre	Fleabag	Nominated	
2020	Best New Comedy	Fleabag	Nominated	
2020	Best Actress in a Leading Role in a Play	Fleabag	Nominated	

== Other theatre awards ==
Year	Award	Category	Nominated work	Result	Ref.
2013	Evening Standard Awards	Most Promising Playwright	Fleabag	Nominated	
2014	Critics' Circle Theatre Awards	Most Promising Playwright	Fleabag	Won	
2014	Offie	Best Female Performance	Fleabag	Won	
2014	Offie	Most Promising New Playwright	Fleabag	Won	
2019	Drama Desk Awards	Outstanding Solo Performance	Fleabag	Nominated	
2019	Drama League Awards	Distinguished Performance	Fleabag	Nominated	

== Critics' awards ==
Year	Category	Nominated work	Result	Ref.
Critics' Choice Television Awards
2016	Best Comedy Series	Fleabag	Nominated	
2016	Best Actress in a Comedy Series	Fleabag	Nominated	
2019	Best Actress in a Comedy Series	Fleabag	Won	
2019	Best Comedy Series	Fleabag	Won	
Television Critics Association Awards
2016	Individual Achievement in Comedy	Fleabag	Nominated	
2016	Outstanding Achievement in Comedy	Fleabag	Nominated	
2019	Individual Achievement in Comedy	Fleabag	Won	
2019	Program of the Year	Fleabag	Won	
2019	Outstanding Achievement in Comedy	Fleabag	Won	

== Miscellaneous awards ==
Year	Award	Category	Nominated work	Result	Ref.
2019	Dorian Awards	TV Comedy of the Year	Fleabag	Won	
2019	Dorian Awards	TV Performance of the Year—Actress	Fleabag	Won	
2019	Dorian Awards	Wilde Wit of the Year	Herself	Won	
2019	Dorian Awards	Wilde Artist of the Decade	Herself	Nominated	
2017	Gotham Independent Film Awards	Breakthrough Series – Long Form	Fleabag	Nominated	
2018	Gotham Independent Film Awards	Breakthrough Series – Long Form	Killing Eve	Won	
2020	Satellite Awards	Best Actress in a Musical or Comedy Series	Fleabag	Won	
2020	Satellite Awards	Best Television Series – Musical or Comedy	Fleabag	Won	

== Special honours ==
Year	Award	Category	Nominated work	Result	Ref.
2017	Royal Television Society Awards	Breakthrough Star	Fleabag	Won	
2017	Royal Television Society Awards	Writer – Comedy	Fleabag	Won	
2019	Britannia Awards	British Artist of the Year	Herself	Won	
2020	Time 100	Artists	—N/a	Included	

=== Arms ===
Coat of arms of the Waller-Bridges
Notes Royal Licence granted in May 1913 Crest 1st, on a wreath of the colours an eagle rising holding in the beak a sprig of laurel Proper (Bridge); 2. on a wreath of the colours, three mascles Or, in front of a walnut-tree Proper (Waller). Escutcheon Quarterly, 1st and 4th: Azure, issuant from the centre of a bar wavy of water Proper in the nombril point a bridge of three arches embattled Argent, masoned Sable, the whole between as many sea lions each crowned with a naval coronet Or (Bridge); 2nd and 3rd: Azure, between two bendlets Or, three walnut-leaves Argent, the whole between two fleur-de-lys of the Last (Waller). Motto Me juvat ire per altum
