= Raymond Butt =

British schoolteacher (1941–2018)

Raymond Butt FRAS
- Born: 26 February 1941; Colchester, Essex, England
- Died: 23 March 2018 (aged 77)
- Education: The King's School, Peterborough
- Alma mater: University of Edinburgh
- Occupation: Teacher
- Known for: Published a directory of every railway station in Britain

Raymond Venimore Jack Butt FRAS (26 February 1941 – 23 March 2018) was a British schoolteacher and fellow of the Royal Astronomical Society. An accomplished rower and coach, he twice won the Boston rowing marathon. He was a member of the Stewards' Enclosure at Henley Royal Regatta for nearly 50 years.

He was said to be able to recite pi to 3,500 places and to have once memorised the entire British railway timetable. He formed a large collection of railway tickets and in 1995 published a directory of "every station, halt, platform and stopping place on the British passenger network".

== Early life and family ==
Raymond Butt, also later known as Peter, was born in Colchester, Essex, on 26 February 1941 to Herbert Butt and his wife Kathleen Butt (née Upchurch). He was educated at the King's School, Peterborough, where he was a chorister and developed an interest in rowing.

He studied natural philosophy (physics) at the University of Edinburgh where he was taught by the future Nobel laureate Peter Higgs and the mathematician Alexander Aitken. He married Jane Woods in 1980 and the couple had a son and a daughter. They divorced in 1989.

== Career ==
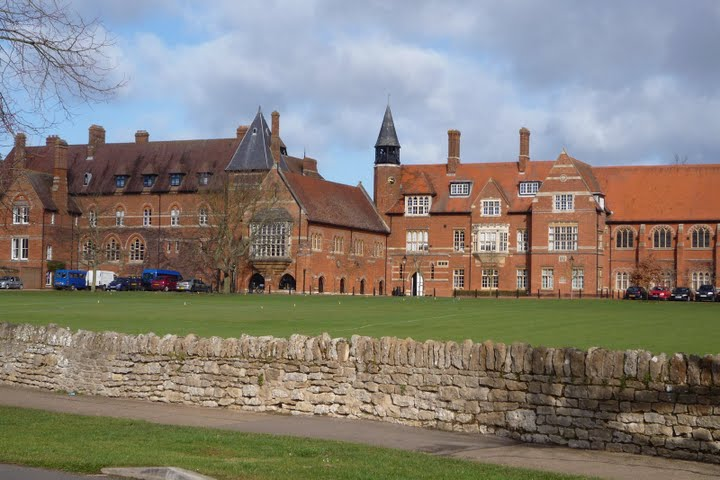
Abingdon School

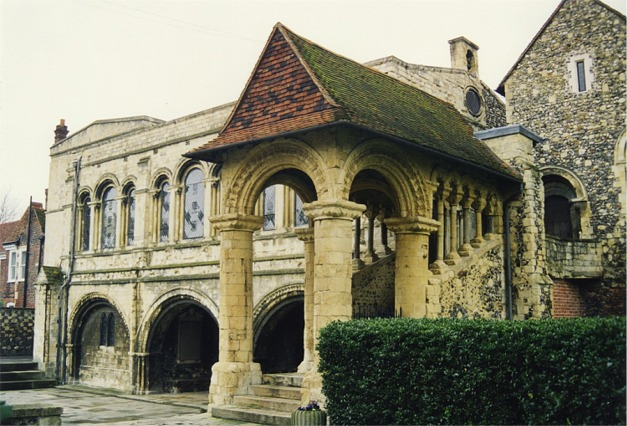
The Norman staircase at The King's School, Canterbury

Butt trained as a teacher at Cambridge from where in 1965 he joined Abingdon School. There, he taught physics and coached rowing before moving to The King's School, Canterbury, where he taught physics and astronomy and continued as a rowing coach. His pupils at The King's School included Michael Foale, the first British-born astronaut. His party pieces there were said to include reciting pi to 3,500 places and having once memorised the entire British railway timetable.

He created the observatory at The King's School and earned a master's degree in astrophysics. He was elected a fellow of the Royal Astronomical Society in 1977 and jointly authored scientific papers about the Moon. He formed a large collection of railway tickets and in 1995 published a directory of "every station, halt, platform and stopping place on the British passenger network".

After his retirement from teaching in 1998 he worked for a decade as an usher at Ashford County Court and was an examiner for the British Physics Olympiad.

== Rowing ==
He rowed at the Henley Royal Regatta in 1968 when he competed in the Silver Goblets competition for coxless pairs and in 1969 was elected to the Stewards' Enclosure there, performing nearly 50 years service. He twice won the Boston rowing marathon. At The King's School he implemented new techniques of rowing based on his knowledge of physics that involved the rowers pausing for a split second at the end of each stroke.

== Later life ==
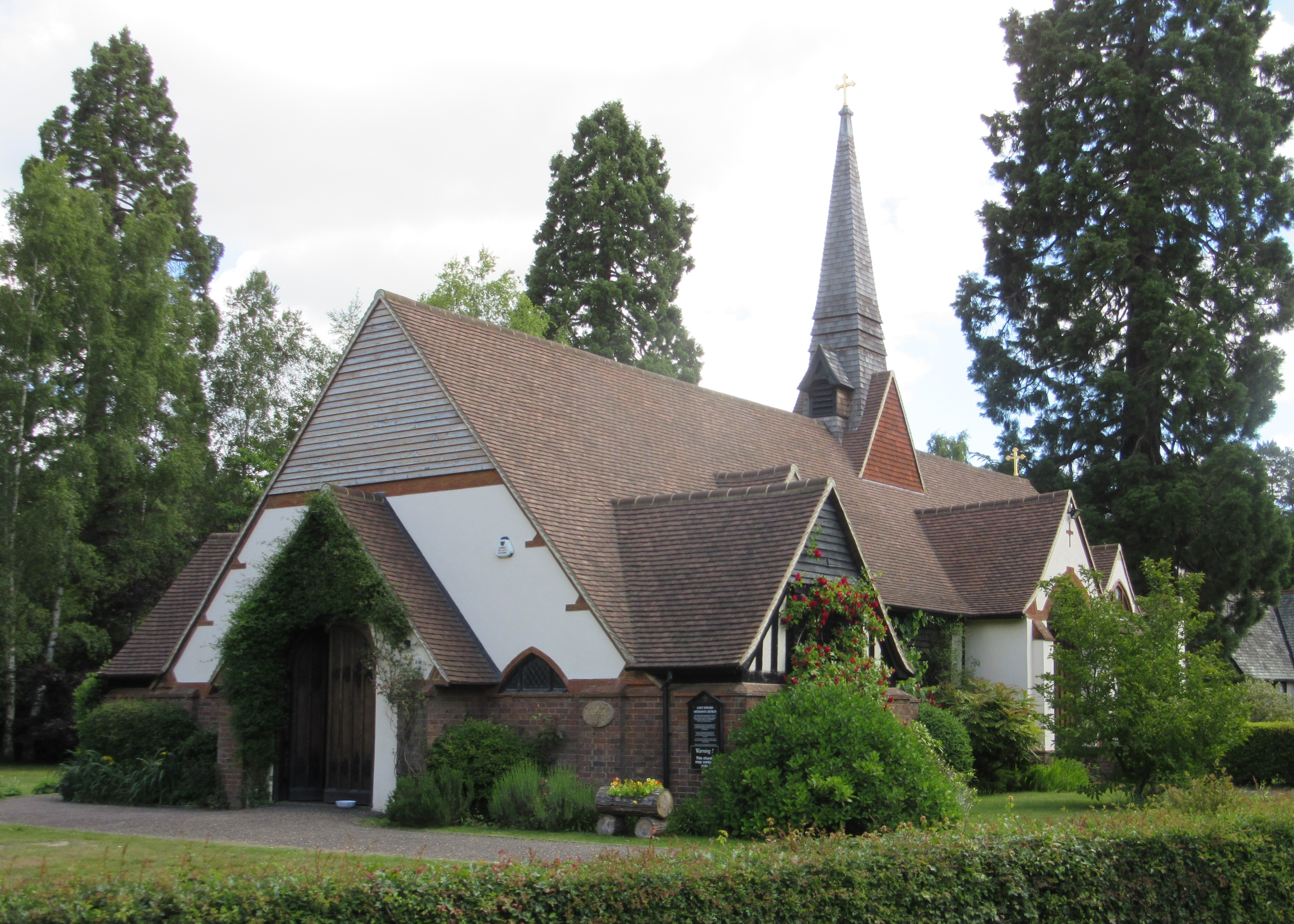
St Edward the Martyr Orthodox Church, Brookwood

Late in life, Butt converted from the Church of England to the Eastern Orthodox Church, taking the name of Peter and becoming a reader at the St Edward the Martyr Orthodox Church in Brookwood, Surrey, for which he was required to learn the Greek and Slavonic liturgy. He died from the effects of pancreatic cancer on 23 March 2018. His funeral was at the Saint Edward Brotherhood at Brookwood, Woking, according to the Byzantine Rite.

== Selected publications ==
- Butt, R. V. J.; Bastin, J. A. (1977). "Latitude effects in lunar thermal evolution". The Moon. 16 (3): 339–347. Bibcode:1977Moon...16..339B. doi:10.1007/BF02634583. S2CID 120619924.
- Hirth, W.; Butz, M.; Velden, L.; Fürst, E. (1977). "The centre-to-limb variation of the moon's brightness at 2 and 6 cm wavelength". The Moon. 17 (4): 395–400. Bibcode:1977Moon...17..395H. doi:10.1007/BF00562648. S2CID 122518607.
- Butt, R. V. J. (October 1995). The Directory of Railway Stations: details every public and private passenger station, halt, platform and stopping place, past and present (1st ed.). Sparkford: Patrick Stephens Ltd. ISBN 978-1-85260-508-7. OCLC 60251199. OL 11956311M.
