= King Edward VI Camp Hill School for Boys =

Location
- Vicarage Road; Kings Heath, Birmingham, West Midlands, B14 7QJ; England; 52.42964°N 1.90289°W

Information
- Other name: Camp Hill Boys
- Type: Grammar school; Academy
- Motto: Latin: Spartam nactus es, hanc exorna (Sparta is Yours: Adorn It)
- Established: 1883
- Founder: King Edward VI Foundation
- Department for Education URN: 137045 Tables
- Ofsted: Reports
- Chair of Governors (Foundation): B. Matthews
- Headteacher: Russell Bowen
- Gender: Boys
- Age: 11 to 18
- Enrolment: 1,200+
- Language: English
- Hours in school day: 7 (5 in classroom)
- Houses: Tudor (green), Howard (blue), Seymour (yellow), and Beaufort (red)
- Website: www.camphillboys.bham.sch.uk

King Edward VI Camp Hill School for Boys, also known as Camp Hill Boys, is a grammar school in Birmingham, United Kingdom. It is academically successful, currently ranked tenth among state schools. The name is retained from the previous location at Camp Hill in central Birmingham. In 2021, the school was assessed by The Sunday Times as West Midlands state secondary school of the decade. A Year 9 student was the 2011 winner of The Guardian Children's Fiction Page and the Gold Award in the British Physics Olympiad was won by a King Edward VI Camp Hill student in September 2011. Camp Hill sent a boy to the International Chemistry Olympiad for 4 consecutive seasons (2016, 2017, 2018, and 2019). In the 2019 Chemistry Olympiad, Camp Hill received the second most gold certificates, coming second to St Paul's School, London.

Ofsted inspections classify Camp Hill as an Outstanding Provider.

== History ==
The school was founded in January 1883 and operated for two terms on the New Street site of King Edward's School. It opened at its intended site at Camp Hill in Birmingham, near the city centre in September 1883, and moved to its current location, in the suburb of Kings Heath, adjacent to Kings Heath Park, in 1956. The school currently shares the campus with its sister school, King Edward VI Camp Hill School for Girls. Camp Hill Boys celebrated its 50-year jubilee in 2007 with a concert at Symphony Hall and the burial of a time capsule to be opened in another 50 years' time. It celebrated its House Centenary in 2007–8, with special events throughout the year that are not normally part of the house competition e.g. 5-a-side football.

== Admission ==
Admission to Camp Hill is based upon success in the 11+ exam along with consideration of proximity to the school. It is also guaranteed that at least 25% of students admitted will be "Pupil Premium Pupils", which are pupils whose families will have received free school meals at some point in the six years prior to application. Those living outside the catchment are able to attend Camp Hill, but only if they achieve a very high score in the 11+, and the quota for catchment pupils is not filled. This admissions policy replaced the previous one for admissions starting in 2020. Previously, no weight was attached to proximity to the school, and the quota for Pupil Premium Pupils was 20%.

=== Admissions controversy 2020 ===
For the academic year starting in 2020, changes were made to admissions criteria by the Foundation of the Schools of King Edward VI, the body which oversees the running of Camp Hill and the other King Edward schools in Birmingham. These changes were praised by some but proved controversial, with only 27% of those consulted supporting the plans. The changes increased admissions of Pupil Premium students to 25%, and due to the implementation of new catchment areas, admissions were restricted almost exclusively to a small area of city wards surrounding the school. Previously, applications were open to any UK citizen. In public consultation, many concerns were raised about the catchment areas, including that they may be designed to increase applications to the private school of King Edward's School in Edgbaston, overseen by the same body, and that students from the wider West Midlands county, in areas such as Solihull, would find it near impossible to gain entry if not part of the Pupil Premium quota. These concerns were brushed aside by the Schools of King Edward VI, which explained them as affluent parents outside Birmingham being disappointed at their loss of entitlement to a grammar school place. The BBC and others published articles on the changes, but all largely ignored the concerns about the catchment area, focussing instead on the issue of increased admission of deprived pupils, and the perceived class struggle. Additionally, the 11+ entry score, which used to be different for each grammar school (with Camp Hill having the highest entry score) was lowered and made the same for every King Edward VI grammar school in Birmingham, which many say is a way of decreasing the school's quality. In a FOI request to The King Edward Schools, release of the consultation responses, and information regarding reasons for the catchment plans, was refused. A complaint regarding conflicts of interest and concerns raised in the consultation was also disregarded.

== Rankings ==
- Ranked as the best state secondary school in the West Midlands, The Sunday Times Schools Guide 2022.
- Ranked second in Birmingham's top 10 primary and secondary schools for 2025, from The Sunday Times' Parent Power Guide
- Ranked in the top 100 state schools 2025 in the Daily Mail's best 100 state schools list.
- In 2006, the school was assessed by The Sunday Times as state school of the year.

== Sports ==
The sports played at Camp Hill are seasonal: rugby, and hockey in the Winter and Spring term, and cricket, athletics and tennis in the Summer term. Other sports include basketball, fitness, handball and football. In their games afternoon, Seniors (Years 11–13) especially the sixth form have the opportunity to play a wide variety of sports, including football, hockey, rugby, cricket, athletics, basketball, badminton, volleyball, table tennis, swimming, squash and tennis. All students are required to take part in certain house events (known as Standards) - cross-country, swimming and athletics. Other off-curriculum sports include swimming, rugby and cricket training after school.

== Notable alumni ==
- Mark Billingham, author, crime fiction
- Keith Campbell member of the team that cloned Dolly the sheep
- Fintan Coyle, co-creator of TV gameshow "Weakest Link"
- Roger Cotterrell, Anniversary Professor of Legal Theory since 2005 at Queen Mary, University of London
- Archibald John Davies, stained glass artist, founder of the glass studio at the Bromsgrove Guild of Applied Arts
- Alan Dedicoat, BBC announcer and newsreader
- Christopher Dunn, bass guitarist with 1970's Birmingham band, City Boy. Hit song in 1978 was '5705'. Son of Leslie Dunn, actor in "The Archers".City Boy (band)
- Reginald Eyre, Conservative MP for Birmingham Hall Green from 1965–87 and Chairman of the Birmingham Heartlands Development Corporation from 1987–98
- Don Paul Fowler, classical scholar
- Clifford Grey (real name Percival Davis), composer who wrote If You Were the Only Girl (In the World), and won Olympic gold medals in 1928 and 1932 for the USA bobsleigh team
- Nicholas Green (judge) QC, High Court Judge, Queen's Bench Division 2013, UK Permanent Representative to the Council of Bars and Law Societies of Europe from 2000-2 and Vice-Chairman of the Bar Council of England and Wales
- Robin Grimes, materials scientist, Foreign Secretary to the Royal Society
- Frank Heaven, cricketer
- Masud Husain FRS FMedSci Professor of Neurology & Cognitive Neuroscience, University of Oxford
- Harry Jephcott, President of the Royal Institute of Chemistry from 1953–5, and Chairman of Glaxo Group from 1950–64
- John Light, actor.
- Richard Mottram GCB, former Permanent Secretary in the UK civil service, and Chairman of Amey plc (2008-2017)
- Charles Talbut Onions CBE, lexicographer, contributed to the history of the Oxford English Dictionary
- Edward William Salt, Conservative MP for Birmingham Yardley from 1931–45
- David Wheeler, helped invent the subroutine and some encryption algorithms, and Professor of Computer Science at the University of Cambridge from 1978–94
- Conor Woodman, broadcaster and author.
- William Odell, cricketer
- Derek Pearsall, Medievalist and professor of English Literature at Harvard University
- William Charles Osman Hill, primatologist, anatomist and author
