= Louise Ford =

British comedian and actress (born 1982 or 1983)

- Born: Louise Anna Ford; 1982 or 1983 (age 43–44); Bexley, Greater London, England
- Occupations: Actress, comedian
- Years active: 2007–present
- Partner: Rowan Atkinson (2014–present)
- Children: 1

Louise Ford (born 1982 or 1983) is a British comedian and actress. She is known for her roles in comedy television, including the children's sketch series Horrible Histories (2015–2018). She played a leading role as Kate in Phoebe Waller-Bridge's sitcom Crashing (2016).

== Early life and education ==
Louise Ford graduated from the Royal Academy of Dramatic Art in 2007.

== Career ==
Ford has appeared in comedy television, including children's sketch series Horrible Histories (2015–2018) and performed a leading role in Crashing (2016). She portrayed a fictionalised version of Catherine, Princess of Wales in The Windsors (2016–present). Ford has also performed at the Edinburgh Festival Fringe with Yasmine Akram (2011) and with Cariad Lloyd (2014).

== Personal life ==
Ford was in a relationship with comedian James Acaster from 2011 to 2013. After working with actor Rowan Atkinson on the play Quartermaine's Terms in 2013, Ford left Acaster and began a relationship with Atkinson, leading to his separation from his wife in 2014 and finalising divorce in 2015. She and Atkinson have a daughter, born in 2017.

== Filmography ==
=== Film ===
Year	Title	Role	Notes
2012	Fast Girls	Jane	
2016	Denial	Press Conf. Reporter 3	
2021	The Dinner Party	Amy	Short film

=== Television ===
Year	Title	Role	Notes
2009	Law & Order: UK	Sharon	Episode: "Care"
2009	M.I. High	Katrina Houseman	Episode: "Family Tree"
2009	My Almost Famous Family	Verity	Episode: "Bittersweet Symphony"
2011	Doc Martin	Mallory Wilson	Episode: "Ever After"
2011	Misfits	Katie	Episode: "#3.2"
2011–2013	Chickens	Gracie	6 episodes
2012	Doubt on Loan	Mia	Television film
2013	It's Kevin	Various	3 episodes
2014	Ludus	The Herculean (voice)	6 episodes
2014	In the Flesh	Nina	Episode: "#2.6"
2014	We Hate Paul Revere	Rachel Revere	Television film
2015	Horrible Histories	Various / Saxon Lady	4 episodes
2015	Not Safe for Work	Doctor	Mini-series, Episode: "#1.4"
2015–2018	Curious Under the Stars	Diane	25 episodes
2016	Crashing	Kate	6 episodes
2016–2023	The Windsors	Kate	21 episodes
2024	Avoidance	Leila	2 episodes
