= Breaking the Bank =

British comedy film

- Poster
- Directed by: Vadim Jean
- Written by: Roger Devlin
- Produced by: Jake Seal
- Starring: Kelsey Grammer
- Cinematography: Oliver Curtis
- Edited by: Jason Gourson
- Music by: David Buckley
- Production company: Black Hangar Studios
- Release date: December 2014 (Dubai)
- Running time: 98 minutes 105 minutes
- Country: United Kingdom
- Languages: English; Japanese

Breaking the Bank is a 2014 British comedy film directed by Vadim Jean and starring Kelsey Grammer.

== Cast ==
- Kelsey Grammer as Charles
- John Michael Higgins as Richard Grinding
- Tamsin Greig as Penelope
- Mathew Horne as Nick
- Julie Dray as Sophie
- Andrew Sachs as Jenkins

== Production ==
Principal photography began in London in April 2014.

== Release ==
The film premiered at the Dubai International Film Festival in December 2014. It was released theatrically in the United Kingdom on June 3, 2016.

== Reception ==
Leslie Felperin of The Guardian awarded the film three stars out of five and wrote that "it’s diverting enough to pass muster, thanks to a seasoned cast."

The Hollywood Reporter gave the film a positive review: "In any case, audiences should enjoy seeing Grammer playing a Brit with such relaxed nonchalance, and his scenes with the versatile comedienne and stage actress Greig are thoroughly delightful."

Mark Adams of Screen Daily gave the film a negative review and wrote, "...despite the best efforts of Grammer and co-star Tamsin Greig this old-fashioned effort rarely clicks, with the muddled script offering nice ideas but little follow-through.”
