= Conor Woodman =

Irish author and broadcaster (born 1974)

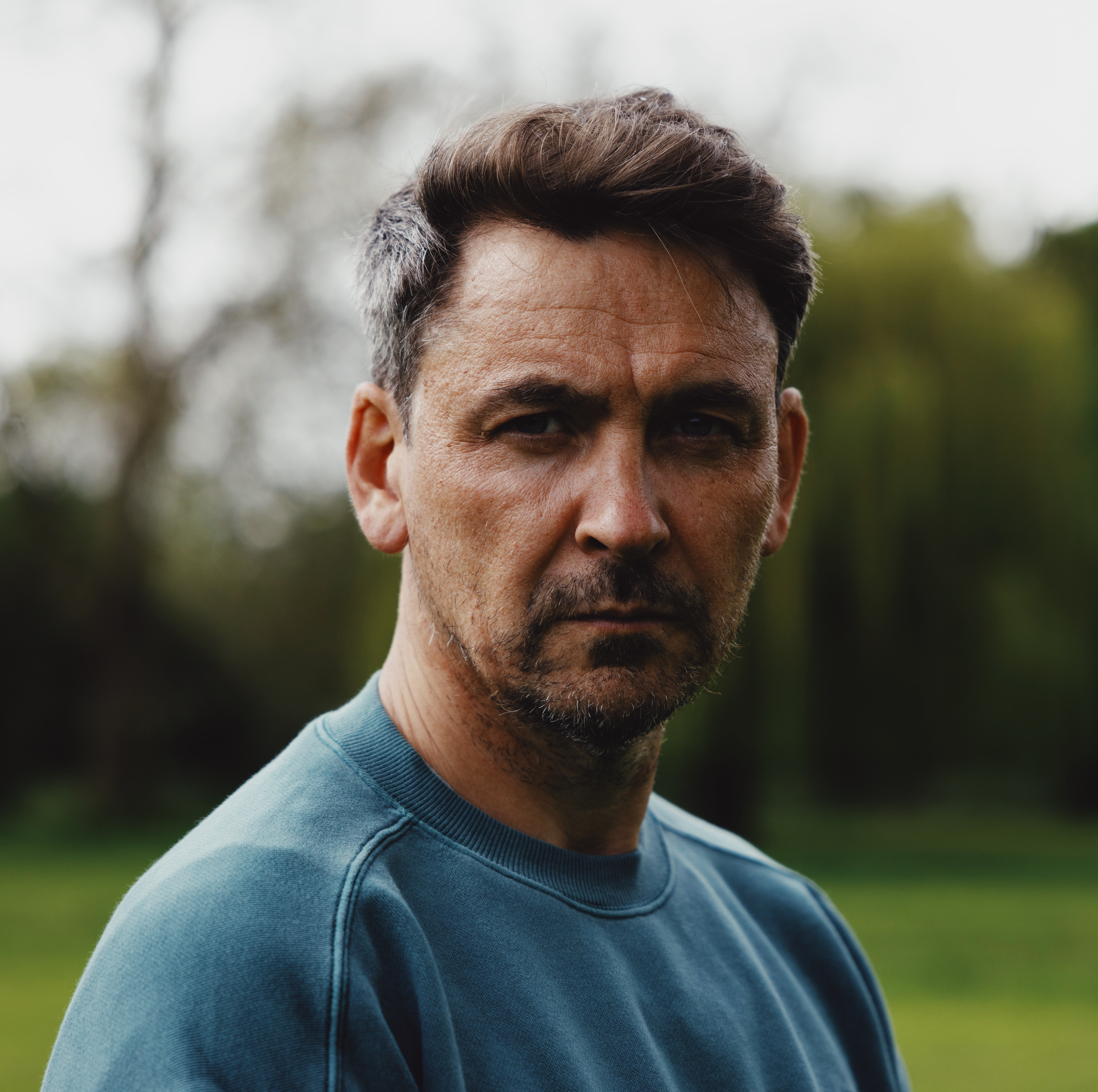
- Born: 21 March 1974 (age 52); Galway, Ireland
- Education: King Edward VI Camp Hill School for Boys; King Edward's School
- Alma mater: University of Manchester
- Occupations: Author, director, television presenter
- Employer(s): National Geographic, Channel 4, BBC, Radio 4
- Spouse: Phoebe Waller-Bridge (m. 2014; sep. 2017)
- Website: www.conorwoodman.com

Conor Thomas Patrick Woodman (born 21 March 1974) is an Irish author and broadcaster best known as the host of Scam City and Around the World in 80 Trades.

== Early life ==
Woodman was born in Galway, Ireland, on 21 March 1974. He is the son of Ciaran Woodman (1954–2015), a cancer epidemiologist, and Miriam Woodman; he is the elder brother of Ciaran Woodman Jr.

Woodman moved to Birmingham, England, at the age of eight. He attended King Edward VI Camp Hill School for Boys and King Edward's School, Birmingham. He later graduated from The University of Manchester.

== Career ==
Woodman has been a financial analyst, an investigative journalist, an author, and a filmmaker. He has reported from around the world on a variety of social concerns, ranging from gangs and organised crime to slavery and smuggling.

=== Books and writing ===
In 2009, Woodman published his first book, The Adventure Capitalist, chronicling his experiences trading his way around the globe. His second book, Unfair Trade: The Truth Behind Big Business, Politics and Fair Trade was published in 2011. Unfair Trade was long-listed for the 2012 Orwell Prize. Woodman's third book, Sharks: Investigating The Criminal Heart of the Global City was published by September Publishing in March 2017. Meth Road : A life-and-death investigation following the world's most destructive narcotic to Australia was published by Allen & Unwin in 2023.

Woodman has also written for several newspapers and magazines including The Guardian, TNT, Wanderlust, Conde Nast and Wexas Traveller.

=== Matt Mason novels ===
In Dec 2020, Hodder & Stoughton announced that Woodman will co-author a series of novels with his collaborator and friend, Channel 4's SAS: Who Dares Wins host, Billy Billingham. The novel Call to Kill is the first in a series featuring SAS soldier Matt "Mace" Mason and was published in May 2021.

The second Matt Mason novel, Survive to Fight was published in June 2022 to widely favourable reviews.

=== Television ===
In 2009, Woodman presented the Channel 4 travel and adventure series Around the World in 80 Trades. The four-part series is based on his book The Adventure Capitalist.

From 2012 to 2014, Woodman hosted two series of the National Geographic Channel show Scam City, in which he travels to various popular cities around the globe and reveals the darker side of tourism. Scam City was nominated for a Broadcast Digital Award in 2014 and in 2015 for Best Factual Series at the Canadian Screen Awards.

Woodman presented two-part ITV series Hunting the Doorstep Conmen in 2013. In October, he presented Exposure: Britain's Booming Cannabis Business for ITV, part of the channel's award-winning Exposure strand.

In 2015, Woodman reported on three episodes of BBC1's flagship consumer affairs show Watchdog.

In August 2016, it was announced that Woodman would host an eight-part series for Channel 4 and History Channel Canada entitled Hunting Nazi Treasure. The first season aired on History Channel Canada in October 2017. He appeared alongside The Monuments Men Foundation's Robert M. Edsel in the program which ended in 2018.

=== Films ===
In 2014, Woodman produced and directed his first feature documentary film, True Appaloosa. The film follows Scott Engstrom, an Appaloosa horse breeder, to Kyrgyzstan as she tries to track down a horse that she thought looked like an Appaloosa while watching the TV show Around the World in 80 Trades. Engstrom believed that DNA from the horse might be able to prove that the true source of the North American Appaloosa horse was Asia and not Europe as the history books claim. In January 2015, a 60-minute version of the film was transmitted on the BBC to critical acclaim. The feature-length documentary premiered at the Sun Valley, Idaho Film Festival in March 2015.

In October 2015, Woodman's dramatic short film Jester premiered at the Sunscreen West Film Festival in Los Angeles.

=== Radio ===
Woodman regularly reports back on his travels for the BBC current affairs show From Our Own Correspondent and is also a guest presenter on Radio 4's Costing the Earth.

== Personal life ==
In 2014, Woodman married English actress and playwright Phoebe Waller-Bridge. The couple announced their separation and divorce filing in 2017.

== Bibliography ==
- Woodman, Conor Around the World in 80 Trades – The Adventure Capitalist; London: Pan Macmillan, 2009
- Woodman, Conor Unfair Trade: How Big Business Exploits the World's Poor and Why It Doesn't Have To; London: Random House, 2011
- Woodman, Conor Sharks: Investigating The Criminal Heart of the Global City; London: September Publishing, 2017
- Woodman, Conor, Billy Billingham Call to Kill; London: Hodder & Stoughton, 2021
- Woodman, Conor, Billy Billingham Survive to Fight; London: Hodder & Stoughton, 2022
- Woodman, Conor, Meth Road; Sydney: Allen & Unwin, 2023
