= Thai tailor scam =

Confidence trick

Thai tailor scam, also known as the Bangkok tailor scam, is one of the most common confidence tricks performed in tourist hotspots in Thailand, such as Pattaya, Bangkok, Phuket, and beach towns like Khao Lak.

The scam usually involves a friendly person approaching their chosen victim, offering quality tailor-made clothes at prices cheaper than in department stores. The seller will claim to have an international export company that just opened. After paying up front, the buyer will receive a low-quality, ill-fitting garment made of polyester rather than the promised cashmere or other high quality cloth. Scammers may not be Thai. In one case, a Singaporean worked with Thais to trick Singaporean tourists.

Reports indicate that individuals of various nationalities, including Burmese Nepalis, may also be implicated in such scams. These groups reportedly operate discreetly, targeting specific tourist demographics. Such activities can negatively impact the reputation of Thai and Indian communities involved in legitimate tailoring businesses.

== See also ==
- Gem scam
- Thai zig zag scam
- Crime in Thailand
