= Gem scam =

Confidence game against tourists in Thailand

The gem scam is a confidence trick performed usually against tourists. The most known version occurs in Bangkok, Thailand, as well as other cities in the country. It is one of the most pervasive scams in Thailand. Most of the shops are gold or jewelry shops. The marks tend to be tourists from outside Thailand. It has been alleged that this scam has been operating for the past 20 years, sometimes in the same premises. It has been suggested that individuals in the Royal Thai Police and even politicians protect this scam. The scam was demonstrated on an episode of the BBC series The Real Hustle and in a Scam City episode in Bangkok. Also in other countries such as Turkey and Sri Lanka, the trick is performed in various versions.

== The scam ==
A network of touts and con men present the mark with an opportunity to profit from buying discount gems from a jewelry shop. The mark is convinced that he can buy gems at duty-free price and bring them overseas for a threefold or more profit. Through a network of helpers, each of whom tells the mark bits of information, the mark is guided to the jewelry shop.

1. A tout will be on the lookout at popular tourist spots like the Grand Palace, Wat Pho, Khaosan Road, Siam Square, or other temples or tourist attractions in Bangkok. (Also, the scam may often be initiated by a tuk-tuk driver.) The tout will be dressed as a student or gentleman and will approach the mark to tell him the place he is about to visit is closed today because of some made-up holiday. The tout, taking advantage of the Thai people's reputation for friendliness, may strike up a conversation, asking where the mark is from, and if this is his first time in Bangkok. The tout will also tell the mark that a certain tuk-tuk waiting nearby is cheap or even free because it has been sponsored by the tourism ministry and can bring him to other temples elsewhere to visit. Sometimes this gentleman finds out which country the mark is from and informs the con man at the next layer about it.
2. If the mark gets on the tuk-tuk, the driver will bring him to a secluded temple in the city, drop him off, and wait for him to return.
3. When the mark walks into the temple, there will be a gentleman praying inside. That person will tell him about a scheme by the government which allows people to buy jewelry duty-free and make a profit when the gems are shipped to their home country, adding that today is the last day of this scheme.
4. The tuk-tuk may take the mark to another temple, where another person (sometimes a Thai, sometimes a Westerner) tells the same story, building up the mark's confidence through a seemingly "independent" verification. If the mark is interested, the person will tell the tuk-tuk driver to take him to the jewelry store.
5. At the shop the mark will be pressured to buy jewelry. If the mark purchases the jewelry, the gem will be packaged and shipped directly to the mark's address in his home country so that he will not have a chance to get the gem appraised or return it for a refund. In the purchase process the mark may be told to go to a nearby gold shop to purchase gold to be exchanged for the gem – this money laundering ensures that any stop-payment on the part of the mark will not affect the gem store's profits.
6. The mark returns to his home country, only to find the jewelry to be worth far less than he paid for it (often due to inferior quality of the stones or gold).

Other scams include fake Thai Mikimoto certificates. Once in a store, a variety of selling tactics are employed, including bait and switch, and "educating" gemstone novices about "fake gems" which are in fact real, and selling them "real gems" which are in fact fake.

== Variants in other countries ==
Gem and jewel scams take place in other countries as well. In the Turkish tourist town Antalya, the tourists are ensnared by an organised trip to a tourist attraction such as a waterfall, after which the tourists are transported to a state-licensed jewelry store. Here the jewelry sold is of regular quality, but overpriced due to large commissions charged on them. In Sri Lanka the jewelry scam takes place more or less in a similar way like in Thailand. Also, a similar scam takes place with old Dutch VOC-coins, supposedly from ship wrecks, which are sold to tourists. The sellers mix low-value real coins with high-value fake coins and sell them for high prices.

== See also ==
- Thai tailor scam
- Thai zig zag scam
- Crime in Thailand
