= Thai zig zag scam =

Confidence trick

The Thai zig zag scam is a confidence trick where one is falsely accused of shoplifting, and then held by police, or those claiming to be police, until "bail" is paid for the alleged theft. At times those fleeced are shown faked closed-circuit television footage as corroboration. In several cases in Thailand, this confidence trick has occurred at the airport, and thus is sometimes called the "Thai airport scam". Most reports of this scam are dated.

== Cases ==
According to the BBC, police in Bangkok's Suvarnabhumi Airport have participated in a series of these scams, robbing tourists of thousands of dollars each time. An English couple was charged with stealing a wallet. The Thai embassy in Singapore published a rebuttal to the BBC article, stating that all legal proceedings in the case of the English were conducted "in accordance with the law." An Irish woman was charged with stealing eye-liner. An Australian man was charged with stealing a doughnut.

== See also ==
- Thai tailor scam
- Gem scam
- Crime in Thailand
