= Phoebe Waller-Bridge =

English actress, screenwriter and producer (born 1985)

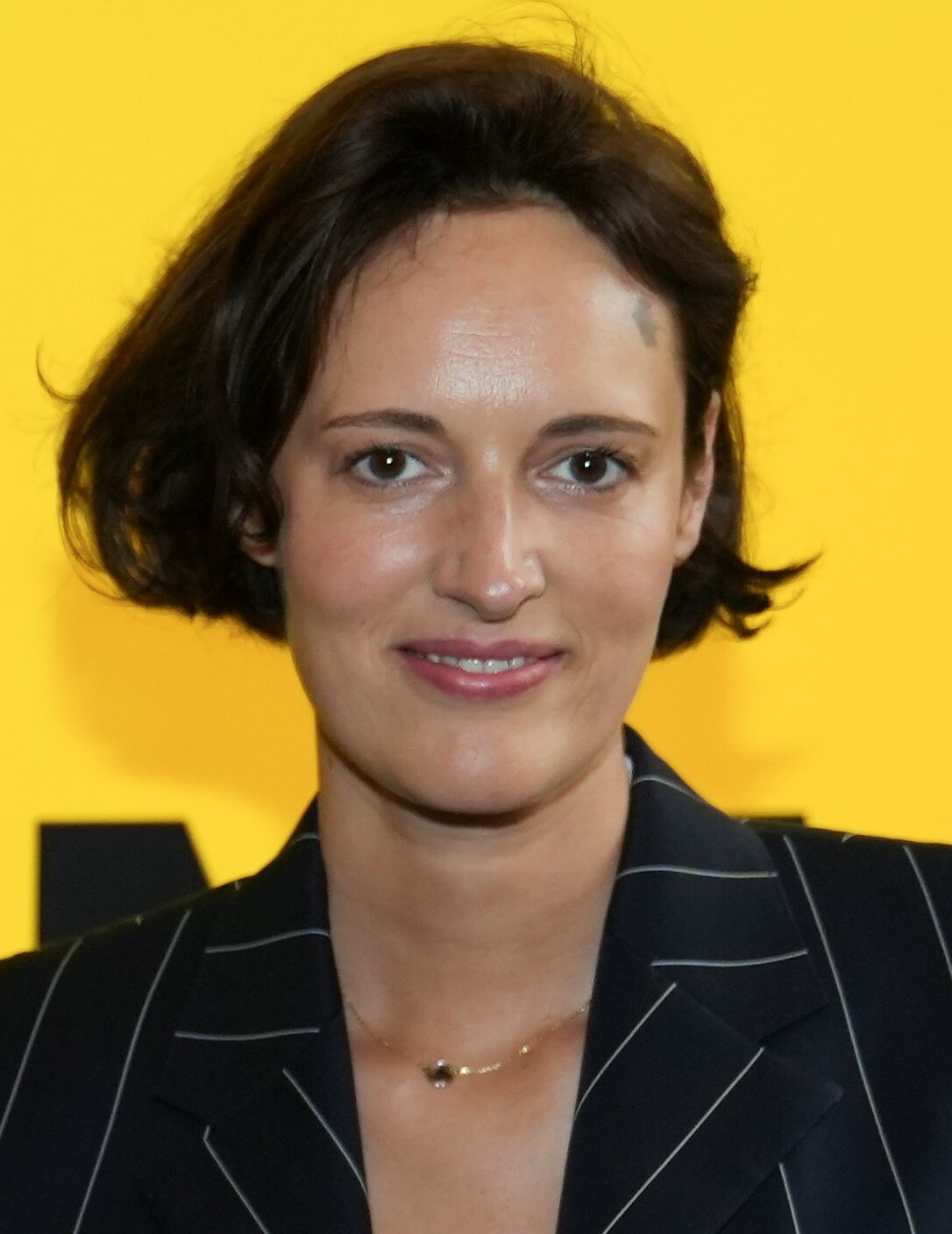
- Waller-Bridge in 2023
- Born: Phoebe Mary Waller-Bridge; 14 July 1985 (age 41); London, England
- Education: Royal Academy of Dramatic Art
- Occupations: Actress; screenwriter; producer
- Years active: 2007–present
- Spouse: Conor Woodman (m. 2014; sep. 2017)
- Partner: Martin McDonagh (2017–present)
- Relatives: Isobel Waller-Bridge (sister); Michelle Dockery (sister-in-law)
- Awards: Full list

Phoebe Mary Waller-Bridge (born 14 July 1985) is an English actress, screenwriter, and producer. As the creator, writer, and star of the comedy series Fleabag (2016–2019), she won various accolades, including three Primetime Emmy Awards, two Golden Globes, and a BAFTA TV Award. She received further Emmy and Golden Globe nominations for writing and producing the spy thriller series Killing Eve (2018–2022).

Waller-Bridge also created, wrote, and starred in the comedy series Crashing (2016). She also acted in the comedy series The Café (2011–2013), in the second season of Broadchurch (2015), and in the films Albert Nobbs (2011), The Iron Lady (2011), Goodbye Christopher Robin (2017), and Solo: A Star Wars Story (2018). She contributed to the screenplay of the James Bond film No Time to Die (2021) and starred in the adventure film Indiana Jones and the Dial of Destiny (2023).

In November 2026, Waller-Bridge purchased and donated a flat in London to Writer's Block, an initiative to bring writers of every background to theatre. The low-cost residence will help underprivileged playwrights stay in and around London despite the high rents. "For many writers, the need for a roof makes writing impossible which is why this pilot is so important. If we want stories told about our complicated world, we need writers of every background writing them."

== Early life ==
Phoebe Mary Waller-Bridge was born in Hammersmith, London, on 14 July 1985, the daughter of Michael Cyprian Waller-Bridge, founder of the electronic trading platform Tradepoint, and Theresa Mary, daughter of Sir John Edward Longueville Clerke, 12th Baronet, employed by the Worshipful Company of Ironmongers. The Bridge, later Waller-Bridge, family were soldiers and clergymen, who came to rank among the landed gentry of Cuckfield in Sussex. Her grandfather, Cyprian Waller-Bridge (1918–1960), "a Wodehousian sort of character... 'the eccentric son of an eccentric vicar'", was an actor and BBC announcer. On her father's side, she is a descendant of the Revd Sir Egerton Leigh, 2nd Baronet, and a distant relative of politician and author Egerton Leigh, Conservative MP for Mid Cheshire from 1873 to his death in 1876.

Waller-Bridge grew up in Ealing, London, and has two siblings: an older sister, Isobel Waller-Bridge, a composer, with whom she has collaborated; and a younger brother, Jasper; they were born in 1984 and 1987 respectively. Her parents are divorced. She was educated at St Augustine's Priory, an independent Catholic school for girls, followed by the independent sixth form college DLD College London in the Marylebone area of London. In 2006, she graduated from the Royal Academy of Dramatic Art in London.

== Career ==
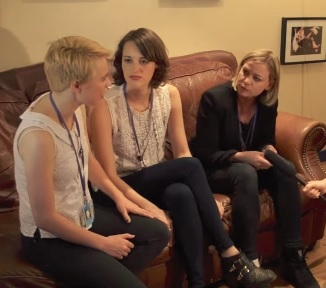
Waller-Bridge (centre) at the Edinburgh Festival Fringe in 2013

Waller-Bridge's performing credits begin in theatre in 2007. At that time, she co-founded the DryWrite Theatre Company with Vicky Jones. They are co-artistic directors of the company. The two women met and became friends while working on theatre productions. Among her acting theatre credits are the 2009 productions Roaring Trade at Soho Theatre and Rope at the Almeida Theatre. She performed in a production of Noël Coward's Hay Fever in 2011 and Mydidae in 2012. Waller-Bridge then wrote and starred in Fleabag, which she first performed as part of the London Storytelling Festival on 25 November 2012. The first full version of Fleabag premiered at the Edinburgh Festival Fringe in 2013. She later wrote the short plays production Good. Clean. Fun. Waller-Bridge returned to the stage for further productions of Fleabag between 2013 and 2019.

Waller-Bridge began her screen career in 2009, playing roles in short films and in individual episodes of television sitcoms and dramas. Her early television appearances include the 2011 film The Night Watch, as well as Bad Education and Coming Up in 2013 and Blandings in 2014. She had supporting roles in The Café from 2011 to 2013 and in the second season of the crime drama series Broadchurch in 2015. Her first feature length theatrical film roles were in 2011 for Albert Nobbs and The Iron Lady. Her role in Albert Nobbs had her cast alongside Emerald Fennell, to whom she would later hand off showrunner duties for Killing Eve.

Waller-Bridge has voice acted for several BBC Radio plays, such as 2013's Vincent Price and the Horror of the English Blood Beast, in which she played actress Hillary Dwyer, and a 2014 adaptation of an Agatha Christie story. She has provided narration in short films, including a 2015 television documentary on dating apps and a 2016 Christmas themed animated short film. She has also voiced ads for companies such as The Cotswold Company, Warburtons, Gordon's Gin, Trainline, Travel Republic, Kuoni Travel, and Tropicana.

In 2016, she wrote and starred in her first television project, the Channel 4 comedy Crashing about a group of twenty-somethings living in an abandoned hospital under the property guardianship scheme. It began streaming on Netflix after airing in the UK, with W Magazine calling it Waller-Bridge's "twisted take on Friends." GQ Magazine described the show's six episodes as: "perfect little whirlwinds of comedy building to one big maelstrom where everyone falls to pieces—some are better off for it, and some are not. No matter where the chips fall, you'll have a good time."

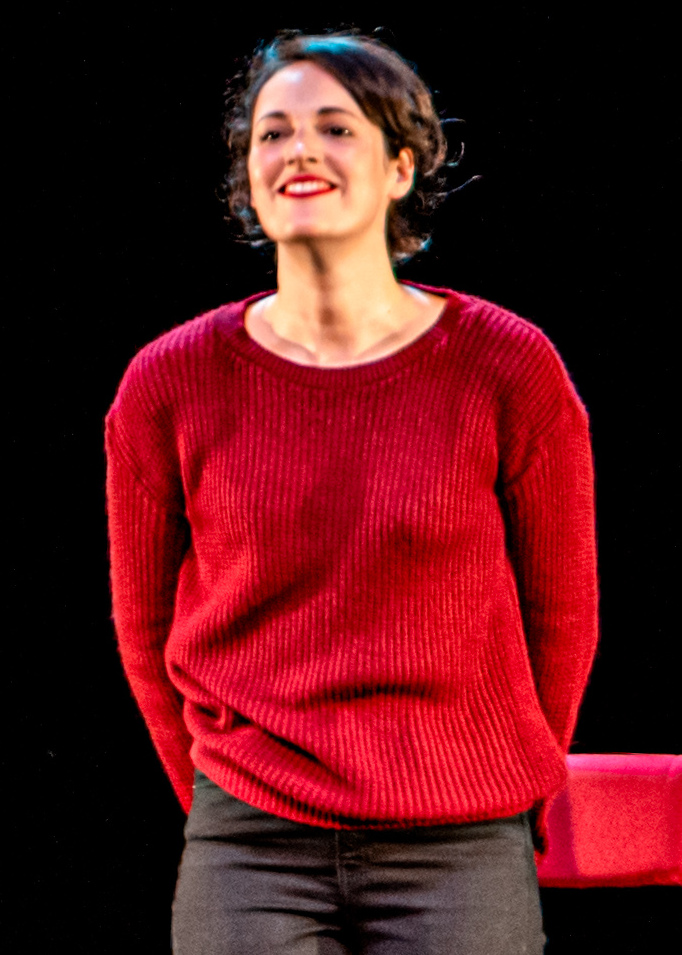
Waller-Bridge at a performance of her one-woman show at the Wyndham's Theatre in 2019

After an initial release on BBC Three, Fleabag was broadcast on BBC Two from August 2016. It was picked up by the on-demand Amazon Video service and premiered in the United States in September 2016. For her performance in the series she won the British Academy Television Award for Best Female Comedy Performance and was nominated for a Critics' Choice Television Award for Best Actress in a Comedy Series. Fleabag's second and final series aired in 2019. For the second series, Waller-Bridge received Primetime Emmy Awards for Outstanding Lead Actress in a Comedy Series, Outstanding Writing for a Comedy Series, and Outstanding Comedy Series. She also topped the Radio Times's TV 100 power list that year.

She voiced and performed droid L3-37 in the Star Wars film Solo: A Star Wars Story (2018). Waller-Bridge wrote and produced the thriller television series Killing Eve, based on novels by Luke Jennings. She was also the showrunner for series 1. The BBC America series stars Sandra Oh and Jodie Comer and premiered in April 2018 to critical acclaim. For her work on the series, she received nominations for the Primetime Emmy Award for Outstanding Writing for a Drama Series and Outstanding Drama Series, the latter as a producer.

In March 2019, HBO ordered the series Run, with Waller-Bridge as executive producer. In the series, she also portrayed the recurring character Laurel. It was cancelled after one season. In 2019, Waller-Bridge co-wrote the screenplay for No Time to Die (2021), the 25th James Bond film, along with Neal Purvis, Robert Wade and Cary Joji Fukunaga. It was stated she was brought on to introduce "more humour and the offbeat style of writing she is best known for." In September 2019, Waller-Bridge signed a three-year overall deal with Amazon Studios, continuing from their relationship formed for Fleabag's second season.

In January 2020, Waller-Bridge formed a British-based production house named Wells Street Films with Fleabag stage and series alums Jenny Robins as head of television and film, and Charlotte McBrearty as a development executive. Waller-Bridge voiced Sayan Kötör in series 2 of the television show His Dark Materials. She also directed the music video for "Savior Complex" by Phoebe Bridgers. Waller-Bridge then appeared in the music video for "Treat People with Kindness" by Harry Styles, which premiered on 1 January 2021.

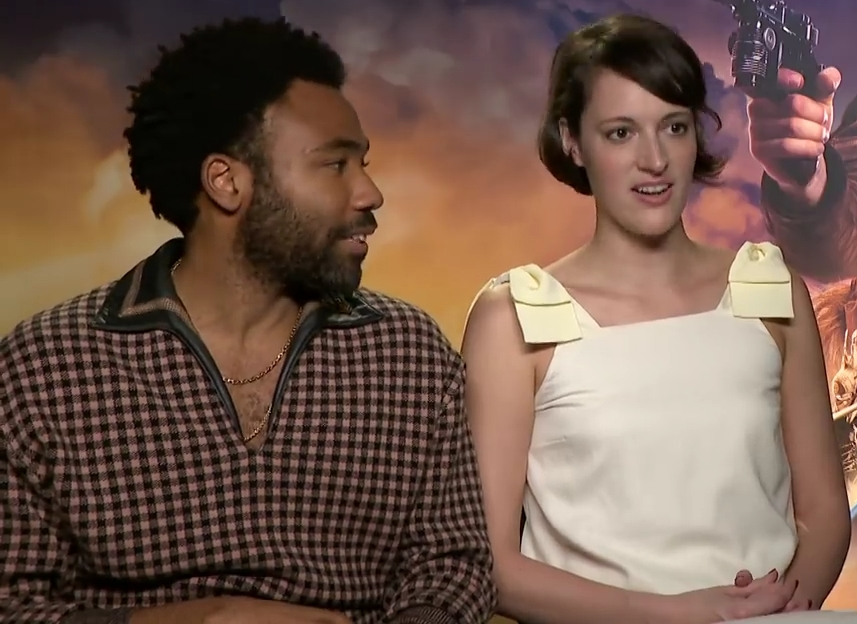
Waller-Bridge and Donald Glover in 2018

In February 2021, she was set to create and star in a television adaptation of the 2005 film Mr. and Mrs. Smith with her Solo: A Star Wars Story co-star Donald Glover, but by September 2021, it was reported that Waller-Bridge had exited the series over creative differences. She appears in Indiana Jones and the Dial of Destiny, as Helena Shaw, which was released in June 2023. In January 2023, Waller-Bridge renewed her deal with Amazon Studios for a further three years, and would be adapting the Claudia Lux horror/thriller novel Sign Here as an Amazon series. It was also reported that Waller-Bridge was developing a Tomb Raider TV series for Amazon Prime, which was formally picked up for series order in May 2024.

== Personal life ==
Waller-Bridge lives in the Shoreditch area of London. She met Irish presenter and documentary filmmaker Conor Woodman when he came to see Mydidae, a contemporary relationship dramatic play by Jack Thorne, at the Soho Theatre in December 2012, in which Waller-Bridge played Marian. They married in 2014. By December 2017, they had separated and filed for divorce; in 2022, the divorce was finalised. Since 2017, she has been in a relationship with Irish playwright and filmmaker Martin McDonagh. They were first linked together on 15 October 2017, when they attended the UK premiere of his film Three Billboards Outside Ebbing, Missouri at the BFI London Film Festival.

Waller-Bridge describes herself as an atheist, although she says she "hopped around a bit from religion to religion" while growing up. She avoids social media, stating in an August 2019 interview that she "would feel pressure to be funny the whole time" and that she did not feel confident enough to deal with the negative comments that come with social media use.

== Performances and works ==
=== Film ===
Key
†	Denotes works that have not yet been released

Year	Title	Role	Notes
2008	Intangible	Anna	Short film
2009	The Reward	Charlotte	Short film
2011	Beautiful Enough	Composer	Voice; short film
2011	Meconium	Lorna	Short film
2011	Albert Nobbs	Viscountess Yarrell	
2011	The Iron Lady	Susie	
2015	Man Up	Katie	
2015	Incident on the Northern Line	Unnamed character	Short film
2016	The 12 Days of Christmas: A Tale of Avian Misery	Narrator	Voice; short film
2017	Goodbye Christopher Robin	Mary Brown	
2018	Careful How You Go	Unnamed character	Short film
2018	Solo: A Star Wars Story	L3-37	Voice
2021	No Time to Die	—N/a	Writer
2023	Indiana Jones and the Dial of Destiny	Helena Shaw	
2024	IF	Blossom	Voice
2025	Rule Breakers	Jessica Curie	
2025	A Big Bold Beautiful Journey	Female cashier	

=== Television ===
Year	Title	Role	Notes
2009	Doctors	Katie Burbridge	Episode: "Chef's Secret"
2010	How Not to Live Your Life	Felicity	Episode: "Don's Posh Weekend"
2011	The Night Watch	Lauren	Television film
2011–2013	The Café	Chloe Astill	13 episodes
2013	Coming Up	Karen	Episode: "Henry"
2013	London Irish	Steph	Episode: "#1.1"
2013	Bad Education	India	Episode: "Drugs"
2014	Blandings	Felicity	Episode: "Custody of the Pumpkin"
2014	Glue	Bee Warwick	2 episodes
2014	Drifters	—N/a	Writer in 3 episodes
2015	Broadchurch	Abby Thompson	8 episodes
2015	Love at First Swipe	Narrator	Voice; documentary
2016	Crashing	Lulu	6 episodes; also creator, writer and executive producer
2016–2019	Fleabag	Fleabag	12 episodes; also creator, writer and executive producer
2018–2022	Killing Eve	—N/a	Writer in 4 episodes, executive producer in 24 episodes
2019	Saturday Night Live	Herself	Host; episode: "Phoebe Waller-Bridge/Taylor Swift"
2020	Run	Laurel Halliday	Actress in 3 episodes; executive producer in 7 episodes
2020	His Dark Materials	Sayan Kötör	Voice; 2 episodes
2021	Staged	Herself	Episode: "The Loo Recluse"
2021	Great British Theatre	Fleabag	Episode: "Fleabag"
2025	Octopus!	Herself	Voice; 2 episodes
TBA	Tomb Raider	—N/a	Developer and showrunner

=== Theatre ===
Year	Title	Role	Venue	Ref.
2007	Is Everyone OK?	Performer	Latitude Festival, Suffolk	
2007	Crazy Love	Billie	Paines Plough	
2008	Twelfth Night	Viola	Sprite Productions	
2009	Roaring Trade	Jess	Soho Theatre, London	
2009	2 May 1997	Sarah	The Bush Theatre, London	
2009	Rope	Leila Arden	Almeida Theatre, London	
2010	Like a Fishbone	Intern	The Bush Theatre, London	
2010	Tribes	Ruth	Royal Court Theatre, London	
2011	Hay Fever	Sorel Bliss	Noël Coward Theatre, London	
2012	Mydidae	Marian	Soho Theatre, London	
2012	Mydidae	Marian	Trafalgar Studios, West End	
2013	Fleabag	Fleabag	Underbelly, Edinburgh Festival Fringe; Soho Theatre Studio, London	
2014	The One	Jo	Soho Theatre, London	
2014	Fleabag	Fleabag	Soho Theatre Main House; Daehangno Small Theatre Festival, Seoul	
2015	Fleabag	Fleabag	Salberg Studio	
2016	Fleabag	Fleabag	Soho Theatre Main House	
2018	Fleabag	Fleabag	Australia	
2019	Fleabag	Fleabag	SoHo Playhouse	
2019	Fleabag	Fleabag	Wyndham's Theatre	

=== Music videos ===
Year	Title	Artist	Notes
2020	"Savior Complex"	Phoebe Bridgers	Director only
2021	"Treat People With Kindness"	Harry Styles	Performer only
2024	"Perfect Stranger"	FKA Twigs	Performer only

=== Radio ===
Year	Title	Role	Production	Notes	Ref.
2010	Vincent Price and the Horror of the English Blood Beast	Hillary Dwyer	BBC Radio 4		
2011	Money	Georgina Vesey	BBC Radio 3		
2012	Burns and the Bankers	Gemma Goodman	BBC Radio 4		
2012	Gulliver's Travels	Lady Munodi	BBC Radio 4	Episode: "The Voyage to Laputa"	
2013	ElvenQuest	Nigressa	BBC Radio 4	Episode: "The Fat Hog"	
2014	Ordeal by Innocence	Hester	BBC Radio 4	3 episodes	

=== Publications ===
- Waller-Bridge, Phoebe (1 January 2013). Fleabag. London: Nick Hern Books. OCLC 894546593.
- Waller-Bridge, Phoebe (6 October 2016). Fleabag, 2nd Edition. London: Nick Hern Books.
- Waller-Bridge, Phoebe (29 August 2019). Fleabag: The Special Edition (NHB Modern Plays). London: Nick Hern Books.
- Waller-Bridge, Phoebe (12 November 2019). Fleabag: The Scriptures (Hardcover & Paperback). Sceptre.
- Waller-Bridge, Phoebe (26 November 2019). Fleabag: The Scriptures (Hardcover & Kindle). Ballantine Books.
- Waller-Bridge, Phoebe (26 November 2019). Fleabag: The Special Edition (TCG). Theatre Communications Group.

== Awards and honours ==
=== Arms ===
Coat of arms of the Waller-Bridges
Notes Royal Licence granted in May 1913 Crest 1st, on a wreath of the colours an eagle rising holding in the beak a sprig of laurel Proper (Bridge); 2. on a wreath of the colours, three mascles Or, in front of a walnut-tree Proper (Waller). Escutcheon Quarterly, 1st and 4th: Azure, issuant from the centre of a bar wavy of water Proper in the nombril point a bridge of three arches embattled Argent, masoned Sable, the whole between as many sea lions each crowned with a naval coronet Or (Bridge); 2nd and 3rd: Azure, between two bendlets Or, three walnut-leaves Argent, the whole between two fleur-de-lys of the Last (Waller). Motto Me juvat ire per altum

== See also ==
- List of British actors
- List of British playwrights since 1950
- List of atheists in film, radio, television and theatre
- List of Primetime Emmy Award winners
- List of Golden Globe winners
