= Crashing (British TV series) =

2016 British comedy-drama television miniseries

- Genre: Comedy
- Created by: Phoebe Waller-Bridge
- Written by: Phoebe Waller-Bridge
- Directed by: George Kane
- Starring: Phoebe Waller-Bridge; Jonathan Bailey; Julie Dray; Louise Ford; Damien Molony; Adrian Scarborough; Amit Shah
- Country of origin: United Kingdom
- Original language: English
- No. of seasons: 1
- No. of episodes: 6

Production
- Executive producers: Kenton Allen; Liz Lewin
- Producer: Josh Cole
- Cinematography: Ben Wheeler
- Editors: Mark Henson; Bridgette Williams
- Running time: 23 min
- Production company: Big Talk Productions

Original release
- Network: Channel 4
- Release: 11 January – 15 February 2016

Crashing is a British comedy series produced by Big Talk Productions and written and created by Phoebe Waller-Bridge. Its six episodes aired from 11 January 2016 to 15 February 2016 on Channel 4 and was released internationally as a Netflix Original series. It stars Waller-Bridge, Jonathan Bailey, Julie Dray, Louise Ford, Damien Molony, Adrian Scarborough, and Amit Shah.

== Premise ==
Crashing follows the lives of six twenty-somethings living together as property guardians in a disused hospital, keeping the building safe in exchange for cheaper rent and a strict set of rules. The close personal relationships start to overlap, and the group navigates sexual tension and personal baggage.

== Cast ==
- Phoebe Waller-Bridge as Louise "Lulu", a childhood friend of Anthony's, who moves into the hospital
- Jonathan Bailey as Sam, a sex-obsessed friend of Anthony's who grows closer to Fred
- Julie Dray as Melody, a French artist who becomes interested in Colin
- Louise Ford as Kate, a perfectionist engaged to Anthony who becomes at odds with Lulu
- Damien Molony as Anthony, a cook who is engaged to Kate and is a childhood friend of Lulu
- Adrian Scarborough as Colin Carter, a divorced colleague of Kate's who becomes a "muse" to Melody
- Amit Shah as Fred Patini, a gay man who becomes close friends with Sam
- Susan Wokoma as Jessica, Kate's bisexual co-worker, who has a sex addiction. Sam initially expresses an interest in sleeping with her, and she later kisses Kate.
- Lockie Chapman as Will, Fred's self-absorbed Australian boyfriend. He works as a telephone volunteer at Samaritans, and it is hinted that he is rich.
- Kathy Burke as Aunt Gladys, Lulu's eccentric great aunt who has an inappropriate sexual interest in Lulu. She is shown to be an alcoholic.
- Janie Dee as Cara, Colin's ex-wife

== Episodes ==
No.	Title	Directed by	Written by	Original release date	UK viewers (millions)
1	Episode 1	George Kane	Phoebe Waller-Bridge	11 January 2016	0.72
Lulu travels to London to surprise her childhood friend Anthony, who lives in a condemned hospital as a property guardian in exchange for cheapened rent. Anthony lives with a number of housemates including his "anal" fiancée Kate, their overtly sexual friend Sam, French artist Melody, and the timid Fred. Sam convinces Kate to throw him an elaborate scavenger hunt as his birthday party, which is attended by a number of friends and Kate's colleagues, including the recently divorced Colin, who fascinates Melody. Anthony is delighted by the arrival of Lulu, although tension immediately arises for Kate due to the attraction between the two friends. While Lulu and Anthony become reacquainted, the housemates are split into partners for the party. Melody and Colin bond, while Sam discovers a surprising friendship with Fred. At the conclusion of the party, Kate invites Lulu to move into the hospital's spare room.
2	Episode 2	George Kane	Phoebe Waller-Bridge	18 January 2016	0.65
Lulu moves into the hospital. Following a fit of hysterics regarding their bath blowing up, Kate accidentally gets Lulu a temporary job as a receptionist at her work, where Melody calls, demanding to see Colin. Kate deliberately sends Lulu on an impromptu, fake delivery task to stop her going to lunch with Anthony, which backfires spectacularly when Lulu brings Colin to Anthony's restaurant to meet Melody. Melody is enraptured by Colin, and requests to make him and his pain the subject of her art, and Colin moves into the hospital. Sam is keen to spend more time with Fred, and gets him to take the day off work to spend it with him, which concludes with Sam attending his father's funeral. Fred begins to express interest in Sam; however, Sam gently rebuffs him, but continues to lead him on. Anthony confronts Kate about the fake package, where she admits her unease at Anthony and Lulu spending time together.
3	Episode 3	George Kane	Phoebe Waller-Bridge	25 January 2016	0.51
Anthony organises a curry night for the housemates, which is attended by Fred's new boyfriend, Will. The dinner is tedious, owing to Kate becoming offended by the subject content and her humour not fitting with the group. During a group sing-a-long, she becomes exasperated that she has to sing about orgasms, and she claims that Anthony told Lulu that she has never orgasmed. Kate tells Lulu in confidence that she has orgasmed before, just never with Anthony. The evening continues to get heated, with Sam becoming jealous of Fred's adoration of Will, causing him to pursue Lulu and irritating Anthony who tells him to stop out of jealousy. Lulu offends Melody and Colin by questioning their relationship, who leave the dinner, and continue to paint. Lulu then accidentally reveals that Kate has never experienced an orgasm with Anthony, with the dinner table then collapsing and ruins the dinner. Anthony and Kate go to bed, and Fred and Will leave, with a drunk Lulu remaining with Sam, who declines her advances. In bed, Kate and Anthony have sex – while Anthony cries, Kate orgasms.
4	Episode 4	George Kane	Phoebe Waller-Bridge	1 February 2016	0.54
Lulu realises she has not paid the sign-up fee to live in the hospital, and as a result visits her eccentric Aunt Gladys with Anthony to borrow money. Gladys, who strings out the visit, eventually gives her the money after telling Anthony that Lulu believed they would be together. Sam takes Will and Fred to look at housing options, where Will privately tells Sam he dislikes his crass language and behaviour towards Fred. Sam defies him and openly begins showing his animosity towards Will. Melody paints Kate's body, and they begin to bond over their relationships, their femininity and confidence. When Melody asks why Kate likes Anthony, she falters in her response, before they start having a playful paint fight, which is joined by Will, Sam and Fred, and later Anthony and Lulu. Colin returns from a visit to the dentist, and happily tells Melody he is at home at the hospital now. Sam is frustrated after a confrontation with Will when Lulu arrives and suggests they have sex. He agrees, acknowledging Anthony will not be happy. Still drunk from the paint party, Kate admits to Anthony that she has been pretending to be in love with him before falling asleep.
5	Episode 5	George Kane	Phoebe Waller-Bridge	8 February 2016	0.46
The housemates awake to an eviction notice that the building is being knocked down, and they need to move to a new property. Kate wakes up in the morning not remembering her words from the night before, and Sam muses to Lulu he thinks Will is attracted to him. Fred asks Sam if he wants to move to a new property place together which Sam agrees to, but things become complicated when Will announces he has bought a flat, and asks Fred to move in with him. Anthony tells Lulu of Kate's drunken confession, but Lulu does not tell him about Sam, although his suspicions are aroused at breakfast when Will says he overheard Sam having sex. Covering up their night before, Sam and Lulu tell Anthony that Kate is pregnant, which causes Anthony to panic. Sam and Colin call up the Samaritan Help Line in order to prank Will at his job, Sam adopting a peculiar voice and calling himself "Stephen", and causing Fred to deduce it is him. Later at the hospital, Sam confronts Will, who tells Sam he thinks he is gay because he is obsessive about the men in his life. Sam seduces Will into kissing him and he runs to reveal Will's betrayal to Fred, at which point Will tells Anthony that Lulu and Sam had sex, and Sam admits that Kate is not pregnant. After a group brawl, Will is voted to move out of the hospital and Fred breaks up with him.
6	Episode 6	George Kane	Phoebe Waller-Bridge	15 February 2016	0.36
Discovering that Kate is gone, Anthony confronts Lulu and asks if she loves him, which she denies. Kate, disappointed by Anthony defending Lulu's honour, has gone to a boozy lunch with the newly single Fred, and her colleague Jessica who offers insight and perspective on relationships. Anthony and Lulu spend the day together looking for Kate, but see Jessica spontaneously kissing her which prompts Anthony to think Kate is a lesbian. They go home and decide to have sex, despite Anthony knowing that Kate has come home to look for him, and Lulu knowing Kate is not a lesbian. Melody is painting Colin for the last time at the hospital, and he accidentally falls out of the window and needs to go to a real hospital. Fred is ignoring dramatic and frantic phone calls from Sam as he vows to not be the one who runs to his side. However, Sam has accompanied Melody and leaves a deliberately vague voice mail saying he is at the hospital. Fred rushes there and admonishes Sam for stretching the truth and breaking him and Will up, before collapsing from hypoglycemia. Sam stays at his bedside, and after apologising, kisses Fred. Under the guise of being a nurse, Melody looks after Colin in hospital before his ex-wife Cara visits the hospital, and Colin wakes up to show his support for Melody. In the morning, Anthony tells Lulu that Kate does not want to break up, and asks her what he should do. Lulu tells them to remain together, hiding her disappointment. The group ponder where they will go to next, before Lulu and Anthony kiss again. Kate appears and tells them that she is not stupid, implying she knows what they have done.

== Production ==
=== Background ===
The story began as two plays, written by Waller-Bridge, which were developed for television by the production company Big Talk. Waller-Bridge added that, "The stimulus for them was to find the moment something exciting could have happened between two people but doesn’t because they bottle it at the last minute. I always wanted to write about what happened to these people after this moment.”

=== Filming ===
The setting of the show was inspired by Middlesex Hospital, an abandoned hospital located in Fitzrovia near the production company's offices. It was eventually filmed at a disused building of the Royal London Hospital in Whitechapel, which itself was inhabited.

== Release ==
Crashing aired from 11 January 2016 to 15 February 2016 on Channel 4 and was released internationally between 2016 and 2017 as a Netflix Original series.

The series was also shown on Italian, Spanish and Russian television, among others. It was released on DVD by Simply Media on 3 September 2018.

== Reception ==
W Magazine called it Waller-Bridge's "twisted take on Friends." GQ Magazine described the show's six episodes as: "perfect little whirlwinds of comedy building to one big maelstrom where everyone falls to pieces—some are better off for it, and some are not. No matter where the chips fall, you'll have a good time." Alanna Bennett for The Ringer writes: “Waller-Bridge tap-dances through practically every cliché available—but along the way, she bends and warps them. Every trope comes with a sharp right hook. She darkens some […] [and] brightens others”.

== Recognition ==
- 2017 British Academy Television Craft Awards: Best Breakthrough Talent (Phoebe Waller-Bridge)
