= Murder of Wendy Albano =

Murder victim and American businesswoman

Wendy Albano
- Born: Tampa, Florida, US
- Died: February 2012 (aged 52); Bangkok, Thailand
- Occupation: Interior designer
- Children: 2

Wendy Albano was an American businesswoman murdered in 2012 in a hotel room in Bangkok. Authorities in the U.S. contacted the United States Department of State, leading to the arrest of a suspect hiding in India in 2014. The chief suspect was an Indian business associate who fled to India after her death. One of the key pieces of evidence that made him a suspect was their known business relationship and video surveillance from the hotel. U.S. Senator Bill Nelson asked then Secretary of State Hillary Clinton to help with the case.

== Background ==
Albano was an interior designer who had worked on the homes of celebrities including Derek Jeter and Tino Martinez. Her business was called Wendy Albano Interiors. She had lived in the US States of California and Florida. Wendy earned a Bachelor of Science in Advertising from the College of Journalism at the University of Florida in Gainesville, Florida. She was a member of Chi Omega Sorority and was an extremely popular student at Florida. She loved her daughters, design, cats, and life with vigor and enthusiasm.

== Death ==
Albano was found stabbed and strangled to death in February 2012 at a hotel in Bangkok. In September 2014, Indian Police arrested the prime suspect Ritesh Narpatraj Sanghvi, a business associate who had befriended her on Facebook in 2010. They had worked on some business deals and were reportedly working together to import hand-made jewelry. The hotel was Fraser Suites Sukhumvit in Bangkok, and one of the leads was CCTV footage that showed the suspect leaving the establishment.

Sanghvi lodged a legal challenge to his extradition from India to Thailand which was heard in Delhi High Court and dismissed on 7 January 2019. On 28 February 2019, Sanghvi was extradited to Thailand.

== See also ==
- Crime in Thailand
- List of unsolved murders (2000–present)
