= Scam City =

2012 television show

- Genre: Adventure, Reality
- Presented by: Conor Woodman
- Narrated by: Conor Woodman
- Countries of origin: Canada; United Kingdom
- Original language: English
- No. of seasons: 2
- No. of episodes: 20

Production
- Production location: Worldwide
- Running time: 45–48 minutes

Original release
- Network: Travel + Escape, National Geographic Channel
- Release: June 3, 2012 – January 19, 2014

Scam City is a television show which started airing on Travel + Escape in June 2012, and has subsequently aired on the National Geographic Channel, and in Australia on the subscription channel Nat Geo People. Host Conor Woodman travels to some of the world's most popular cities in an effort to expose the darker side of tourism.

== Premise ==
Woodman meets with questionable characters ranging from unethical cab drivers to aggressive pimps as he witnesses and experiences the travel experience of parting with personal property and money. He intentionally falls victim to these alleged scammers and says "yes" to every sex worker and pocket jeweler in the city. The show aims to expose the local adaptations of common scams – from pick pockets, expensive cab fares, to bars luring people in with adult entertainment at a high cost.

== Awards ==
Scam City was nominated for Best Popular Factual Series at the UK Broadcast Digital Awards in 2014 and in 2015 for Best Factual Series at the Canadian Screen Awards.

== Reactions from covered cities ==
=== Istanbul ===
After the transmission of Scam City in Istanbul, the city's authorities responded by making several arrests. As a result of the programme several 'clip joints' in the city were shut down and so-called 'false friends' who were operating in them were arrested, although the practice is still commonplace today.

In the Istanbul episode further scams are exposed at the Blue Mosque where touts trick tourists into paying for unofficial tours and then coerce them into buying goods such as carpets that they do not want. As a result of the program, Turkish authorities moved to change the laws to prevent tourists being targeted in this way.

=== Prague ===
According to Prague's police department, all events depicted in the Prague episode were staged and the scammers were actually hired actors, as Czech Prima TV first revealed in October 2013. The Prague Police spokesperson, Ms. Jana Rösslerová, happened to see the episode on TV and immediately informed her colleagues. The Prague Police started to investigate the crimes depicted in the episode. They found and interrogated people featured in the documentary and checked all places where the crimes should have taken place. The result of their work was discovery that the whole reportage was fiction and staff shooting the documentary hired actors and extras for the roles of scammers. According to the police, the nightclub depicted as a haunt of prostitutes and blackmailers had been closed for several years, and the company Eurotaxi, used as an example of taxi overpricing in Prague, had gone bankrupt in 2011, a year before the show was created.

Czech news agency Stream.cz repeated many of the investigations from the Scam City documentary. Their crew got into similar situations and were sometimes scammed with even worse results. They argued for the integrity of the Scam City programme and also revealed some errors in the statements made by Prague officials. For example, they claimed the notorious bar with prostitutes was not closed in 2011 as the police claimed, but in fact was still open at the time the original documentary was made.

On 29 July 2014, City of Prague announced that they had reached an out-of-court agreement with National Geographic. National Geographic will not broadcast nor offer this episode of Scam City, but no apology is required. The decision to settle out of court was taken since a lawsuit would be long, expensive, and of uncertain outcome.

Conor Woodman was requested by local police to give an explanation, but refused, stating that interviews with criminals had been secured on the basis that information would not be shared with the police. Interpol was requested for assistance in this matter but declined.

National Geographic Channel insists that the documentary is not a fake, and that all persons depicted in the documentary were informed after the filming.

=== Amsterdam ===
An episode aired in January 2014 provoked similar controversy, this time involving the city of Amsterdam. In the episode, various supposed crimes were filmed, including those committed by criminals posing as police officers, and Conor Woodman tweeted, in July 2013, "Amsterdam is right up there for the title of Scammiest City. It has all the right ingredients and all the right chefs!" A police investigation revealed, according to Amsterdam mayor Eberhard van der Laan, that the filmmakers had paid criminals to appear in the videos. National Geographic confirmed that people had been paid, but that they hadn't been actors; pending investigation they pulled the show from their rotation. Van der Laan referred to the show as "scam television", demanding an apology and rectification, and pending that threatened to take the matter to court. Woodman responded in a tweet, "O come on Mr Mayor! Convicted criminals we caught on camera in the Amsterdam ep[isode] say they were only 'acting'. You believe that?!! #whatever".

In March 2014, Amsterdam TV channel AT5 published a story alleging that one of the people who had appeared in the Amsterdam episode claimed to have been paid 1,800 Euro by National Geographic, and that representatives from National Geographic were discussing the matter with the city.

On May 23, 2014, the city of Amsterdam announced that an agreement had been reached with National Geographic; National Geographic acknowledged that many of the events depicted in the show had been staged, though they said no actors were ever used and the program was based on extensive research.

== Season 1 (2012) ==
#	Country	Episode	Details
01	Argentina	Buenos Aires	Scams involve pick pocketing, clip joints, vice girls and taxi scams. Most prevalent is the counterfeit money scam.
02	Czech Republic	Prague	Scammers may disguise as beautiful girls, harmless hawkers and friendly taxi drivers.
03	Brazil	Rio de Janeiro	During Carnival time Rio's scammers come out to party (on tourists).
04	Spain	Barcelona	Creative thieves take what they can from unsuspecting tourists.
05	Italy	Rome	Woodman uncovers an underworld feeding off the booming tourist scene.
06	India	Delhi	Woodman meets medical 'doctors' who are very happy to treat his 'Delhi belly'.
07	Turkey	Istanbul	The exotic scenery of Istanbul gives a perfect environment for scammers to target vulnerable tourists.
08	Thailand	Bangkok	Woodman uncovers a gem scam that involves a chain of scammers.
09	United States	Las Vegas	Tunnel dwellers who live in storm drains do plenty of scamming on the strip of Vegas.
10	Morocco	Marrakesh	Marrakech can be maze-like without a guide, however are the guides as genuine as they seem?

== Season 2 (2014) ==
#	Country	Episode	Details
01	United States	New Orleans	Woodman discovers a range of scammers from street-level crooks to a sophisticated gambling racket with roots in organised crime (Razzle Dazzle aka Bingo Cajun)
02	Mexico	Mexico City	Woodman heads out to discover more about the criminals who have killed, kidnapped and extorted their way through Mexico City's beautiful avenues.
03	United States	New York City	Woodman finds that zero tolerance hasn't swept tourist scams from the streets (fake perfume, pick pocketing, Central Park Tourist Scam)
04	Netherlands	Amsterdam	Fake drugs, ATM scams, Red light district, pick pocketing
05	Israel	Jerusalem	From questionable requests for charity at the Western Wall to pickpockets on the Mount of Olives, Conor discovers the darker side of Jerusalem.
06	India	Mumbai	In Mumbai, Woodman experiences the mother of all taxi scams minutes after his arrival from the airport.
07	France	Paris	Woodman gets his portrait done by street artists without his consent, Chinese paintings being sold as completed by French art students.
08	United Kingdom	London	Woodman goes undercover in his home town of London to discover a whole new side to a city he thought he knew so well.
09	Colombia	Bogotá	Woodman searches for a deadly zombie drug that renders its victims helpless as he explores the underside of Colombia's largest city.
10	Hong Kong	Hong Kong	Woodman gets more than he bargains for when he goes undercover in Hong Kong searching for scams and becomes a sugar daddy to a young woman.
