= Julie Dray =

French actress

- Born: 6 October 1980 (age 45)
- Occupation: Actress
- Years active: 1997–present
- Website: www.juliedray.com

Julie Dray is a French actress.

== Early life ==
At the age of thirteen, Dray won a magazine competition to interview a pop star. Through this experience, she was offered a job as a columnist, and used the money she made to pay for after school drama classes. Dray trained in acting at the Cours Simon and Cours Florent. In addition to French, she is fluent in English and Spanish as well as knowing some Hebrew and Norwegian.

== Career ==
On television, she is best known to international audiences for her roles in the Channel 4 sitcom Crashing (2016) and the HBO and Sky One science fiction series Avenue 5 (2020). She recently starred in Doctor Who (2025) and the BBC hit show Ludwig (2025) Her films include Breaking the Bank (2014), A Bird Flew In (2021) and the American upcoming feature film Haus of Disko (2026). Currently she is filming the second season of Nightsleeper for BBC .

== Filmography ==
=== Film ===
Year	Title	Role	Notes
1997	À l'aube du printemps		
1999	Whatever	Young Woman	
2000	Deuxième vie	Sylvie	
2004	Mariage mixte	Myriam Abecassis	
2006	Comme un lundi		Short film
2006	Le dîner	Clara	Short film
2008	Ralph	Julie	Short film
2008	Le Bruit défendu	Sabine	
2010	Do Elephants Pray?	Malika	
2012	Toussaint Louverture	Louise	
2012	Another Woman's Life	Séverine	
2013	Brûlures	Geraldine	Short film
2014	20 Rules!	Julie	
2014	Breaking the Bank	Sophie	
2014	À part ça la vie est belle	Zoe	Short film
2015	Mike Garcia and the Cruz	Wendy Anarchist	Short film
2016	La femme et le TGV	Dance Teacher	Short film
2016	Le Voyageur		Writer and executive producer
2017	Base	Ash	
2019	For the Cause	Sirine	
2021	A Bird Flew In	Anna	
2025	The Reckoning	Marie	Feature film
2026	Haus of Disko	Annalise	Feature film

=== Television ===
Year	Title	Role	Notes
2001	Méditerranée	Sabine Valbonne	Miniseries
2002	Une famille formidable	Christine	2 épisodes
2002	Nestor Burma (série télévisée)	Élodie	S8E1 Épisode "La Marieuse était trop belle"
2003	Josephine, Guardian Angel	Jennifer	Épisode : "Le Stagiaire"
2004	Navarro	Muriel Rouvière	Épisode : "Fascinations"
2006	Profils Criminels	Virginie	Television film
2008, 2010	Doctors	Nathalie Fournier / Simone Palu	2 épisodes
2009	Venus and Apollo	Young Ingrid	1 épisode
2009	Vive les vacances!	Axelle	Main role
2011	Camping Paradis	Julia	Épisode : "Ça swingue au camping"
2011	Land Girls	Liane Lefebvre	Épisode : "The Enemy Within"
2015	Cradle to Grave	Miss Blondel	3 épisodes
2016	Crashing	Melody	Main role
2017	Riviera	Petra	Épisode : "La Clé / The Key"
2017	Back	Juliet	1 épisode
2018	Wonderdate	Anne	Short
2018	Dad, Inc.	Rose Martin	Television film
2019	Year of the Rabbit	Claudette	Pilot
2019	War of the Worlds	Madeline	1 épisode
2020	King Gary	Marie Laure	Episode: "Holiday Pals"
2020	Avenue 5	Nadia	7 Épisodes
2022	The Curse	Safiya Gatlin	Épisode : "Millionaires"
2023	Le nounou	Sandra	Tv movie
2024	Ici tout commence	Iris Montigny	série française
2024	Ludwig	Tanya	1 episode (episode 3)
2025	Doctor Who	Sabine	1 episode ("The Interstellar Song Contest")
2026	Nightsleeper	Ray	Serie Regular

=== Video games ===
Year	Title	Role	Notes
2019	Anthem	North	French version
2020	Cyberpunk 2077	V	French version
2021	Night Book	Loralyn	
2023	Cyberpunk 2077: Phantom Liberty	V	French version
2024	Dragon Age: The Veilguard	Heir	
2026	Lego Batman: l'Heritage du chevalier noir	Selina Catwoman	French version
2026	Audible: Harry Potter Full Cast edition	Olympe maxime	Audio Book

== Theatre ==
Year	Title	Role	Notes
1998	Le poulet est roti	Cécile	Tadam, Paris
2002	Jalousie en trois fax	Irish	Europe tour
2004	Faux départ	Diane	Théâtre Rive Gauche, Paris
2006	Red Light Winter	Christine	Elephant Theatre Company, Los Angeles
2011	Bang Bang Bang	Mathilde	Royal Court Theatre, London
2019	Fairview	Bets	Young Vic, London

== Awards and nominations ==
Year	Award	Category	Work	Result	Ref
2007	Mediterranean Festival of New Directors	Best Actress	Le dîner	Won	
2010	Method Fest Independent Film Festival	Best Acting in a Low Budget Film	Do Elephants Pray?	Won	
