= A Bird Flew In =

Upcoming drama film

- Theatrical release poster
- Directed by: Kirsty Bell
- Screenplay by: Dominic Wells; Elizabeth Morris
- Produced by: Ben Charles Edwards
- Starring: Derek Jacobi; Jeff Fahey; Sadie Frost; Julie Dray; Sophie Kennedy Clark; Morgana Robinson
- Cinematography: Sergio Delgado
- Edited by: John Smith
- Music by: Al Joshua
- Production companies: Goldfinch; MSR Media
- Distributed by: Studio Soho Distribution
- Release date: 31 October 2021
- Running time: 91 minutes
- Country: United Kingdom
- Language: English

A Bird Flew In is a 2021 British drama film written by Dominic Wells and Elizabeth Morris and directed by Kirsty Bell in her directorial debut. The film stars Derek Jacobi, Jeff Fahey and Sadie Frost. It premiered at the Evolution Mallorca International Film Festival in October 2021.

== Cast ==
- Derek Jacobi as David
- Jeff Fahey as Peter
- Julie Dray as Anna
- Sophie Kennedy Clark as Ari
- Sadie Frost as Diane
- Morgana Robinson as Lucy
- Camilla Rutherford as Rebecca
- Michael Winder as Miles
- Frances Barber as Marie
- Daniel Ward as Rick

== Production ==
The film was shot in London, England, and Marseille, France.
