= Koh Tao murders =

2014 murders in Koh Tao, Thailand

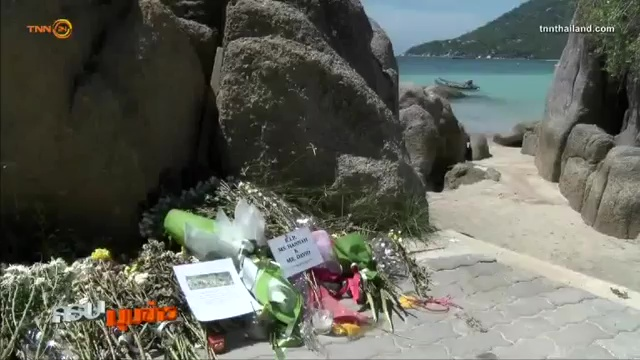
A temporary memorial to Witheridge and Miller at the site where their bodies were found

The Koh Tao murders involved the deaths of two British tourists in Thailand in 2014. On 15 September, the bodies of Hannah Witheridge and David Miller were found on Sairee Beach on the island of Koh Tao, between 4 and 5 am, a few hours after their deaths. Both victims had been hit several times on the head; Witheridge had been raped, and Miller had been drowned.

Two weeks later, two illegal Burmese migrant workers were charged for the murders, primarily on the basis of DNA evidence, and confessed following an hours-long interrogation. The suspects alleged that police used torture and threats to secure a confession. The police investigation and criminal trial were widely criticised by international media, human rights organisations, and legal experts. In December 2015, the pair were convicted of the murder and sentenced to death. Attempts to appeal the sentence failed, but a royal decree was issued by King Vajiralongkorn in 2020 commuting the death sentences to life imprisonment.

The government of Thailand was concerned the murders might affect tourism to the island, with arrivals dropping in the months following the murders. However, the event did not materially affect tourism to the island over the following years.

== Background ==
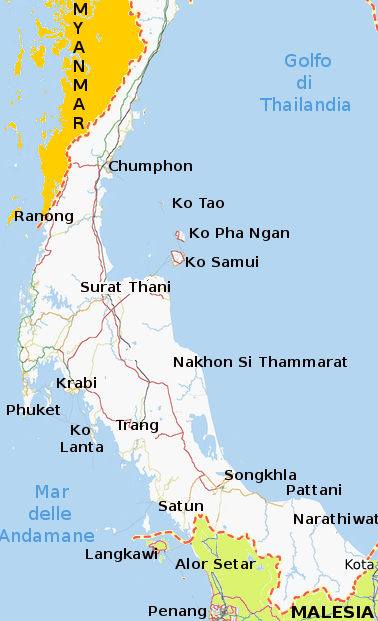
Map showing Koh Tao within the Gulf of Thailand

The island of Koh Tao is located in Southern Thailand. Measuring 21 square kilometres (8 sq mi) in area, it is the smallest of three popular tourist islands in the Gulf of Thailand. Receiving half a million visitors each year, Koh Tao is especially popular with backpackers and known for its marine life and scuba diving. It has over 100 hotels and resorts and was deemed the busiest diving centre in Southeast Asia in 2014. In 2014, the island had a population of around 5,000 locals. Burmese migrant workers made up an additional 5,000, around 2,000 of these being illegal immigrants who bribe local police by paying 500 baht each month. These illegal workers often reside with friends on the island, making it difficult to identify them. Some of these workers said they can earn more money in Thailand compared to Myanmar. The murders were the first cases of homicide on the island in over eight years.

The victims of the murders were Hannah Witheridge, a 23-year-old from Hemsby, England, and David Miller, a 24-year-old from Jersey, a Crown Dependency. Both were students who were backpacking in Thailand. Witheridge had completed undergraduate studies in education at the University of East Anglia and had started post-graduate studies in speech and language therapy at the University of Essex. Miller had just completed his undergraduate degree in civil and structural engineering at the University of Leeds and was starting a master's degree. He was travelling Southeast Asia with a friend after completing a six-week work placement in Australia with a mining company, and arrived in Thailand in August.

Witheridge and Miller travelled and arrived on the island separately on 25 August. Witheridge was travelling with three other friends, and Miller with two others. The two met in Koh Tao while staying at the same hotel.

== Murders ==
Miller and Witheridge were last seen at a bar called AC Bar with friends at a party on Sunday night with around 50 people – mostly foreign tourists – before they left together after 1 am. Their bodies were discovered on Sairee Beach a few hours later, between 4 and 5 am, by a mute Burmese beach cleaner. Miller's body was found floating in the water, and Witheridge's on the beach; the bodies lay approximately 20 metres apart and 30 metres away from their hotel (Ocean View Bungalows). A bloody hoe, believed to be the murder weapon, and a wooden club were found near the bodies, along with three cigarette butts and a used condom. Both bodies were found semi-naked; a pile of clothes was found nearby. The police moved the bodies to prevent them being swept up in the rising tide. Local residents blocked the pier to prevent the unidentified killers from leaving the island.

An autopsy revealed that both victims were hit by a hard object, resulting in head and face wounds. Miller had scratches on his back and water in his lungs indicating drowning. Witheridge's body indicated she had been raped. There was tearing present at the vulva, bruising on the perineum, and a bite mark on her right nipple. DNA was collected from these three areas and sent to a police forensics lab for analysis. However, her clothes were not tested for DNA.

== Investigation ==
Due to concerns the murders might affect foreign tourism into Thailand, the national authorities sought to expedite the investigation into the murders. The police were under pressure to produce results quickly, which affected how they conducted their investigation. The police initially speculated about who the culprit might be, alleging various individuals of perpetrating the crime without clear evidence. They focused on foreign nationals, with a spokesperson for the police claiming "Thais wouldn't do this". Some migrants who were questioned complained that officers scalded them with boiling water during interrogations, allegations which were denied by the police. After initially failing to find a match to one of the migrant workers, the police focused their attention on Western tourists related to the victims. They highlighted a British tourist who had shared a room with Miller as a suspect, labelling it a "crime of passion"; he became the subject of a nationwide manhunt before the police quickly dropped the lead. Several other suspects were also named, amid pressure to produce results, a new one every other day. Over 200 individuals on the island, many of them migrant workers, were tested in mass DNA testing.

According to the prosecution in the subsequent case, CCTV footage analysed by the police showed three individuals riding a motorcycle to 7-Eleven, where they bought beer and cigarettes, before going towards Sairee Beach. Footage near the crime scene also showed one of the three men running into a shortcut. One of the men – Mau Mau – resided nearby. Two weeks after the bodies were found, on 1 October 2014, police interrogated Mau Mau, who said he took the motorcycle and separated from the other two men before the murders occurred, and found them both home asleep by the time he had returned. Police entered the home the next day; only one of the men, Zaw Lin, was present. Following an interrogation, during which police say Zaw Lin admitted he had entered the country illegally, Zaw Lin was arrested and his clothes and motorcycle were seized as evidence. The second man, Wai Phyo, (Note: Some sources also refer to Wai Phyo as Win Zaw Htun.) was believed to have left the island by boat the previous night. He was found hiding on the boat later on 2 October. Both men were 22-year-old illegal migrant workers from Rakhine, Myanmar, who worked in the hospitality industry. They had no prior criminal records.

During interrogation, in which the police used Burmese food vendors as interpreters because the pair could not speak Thai, the suspects confessed to the murders. They stated they were driven by a desire to rape the victim following sexual arousal when they saw the couple kissing on the beach. The police alleged that DNA matched a sample of semen taken from Witheridge's body, and to the hoe and cigarette butts found near the body. Early police reports said Miller's mobile phone was also found in Zaw Lin's home, In the trial, the prosecution said the phone was found smashed at the home of a friend of Zaw Lin's. The police then forced the suspects to re-enact the murder in front of media, a move condemned by legal experts as prejudicing a fair hearing.

Zaw Lin and Wai Phyo retracted their statements following a visit from a consular lawyer for Myanmar and said they had made their statements under duress, after they had allegedly been beaten, left naked in a freezing room, and threatened with electrocution and an extrajudicial killing. The national police chief, Somyot Poompanmoung, denied that torture was involved in the confessions. Thailand's National Human Rights Commission attempted to investigate the allegations, but police representatives did not appear at four scheduled meetings.

The defendants were represented in court by a defence team from Bangkok, composed of nearly 20 lawyers. A request by the defence to delay the hearing and allow more time to prepare was denied by a judge at the Koh Samui Provincial Court. A 900-page police report was produced to guide the prosecution's case, but the defence were not allowed to see the report until the trial began. Public prosecutors initially rejected the report, asking for "certain flaws" to be fixed, more information to be supplied, and for the report to be made "more succinct". In December 2014, the suspects were each indicted on five charges: premeditated murder, killing to conceal a criminal offence, rape, illegal entry into Thailand, and staying in the country without permission. Wai Phyo was also charged with stealing Miller's phone.

=== Trial and conviction ===
An 18-day trial began on 8 July 2015 in the Koh Samui Provincial Court. According to an observer, the sittings lasted over ten hours each day. The suspects were defended pro bono by two lawyers from the Lawyers Council of Thailand. The trial was attended by external observers, including representatives from Amnesty International and the UK's Foreign, Commonwealth and Development Office. Direct quotations from the trial are unavailable, as the judges did not permit the public to take notes. This decision was criticised by the Solicitors International Human Rights Group, one of the observers at the trial.

The prosecution's case focused on findings of the police and medical examiner, with an emphasis on the DNA evidence found on Witheridge's body. They argued that the defendants intended to kill Miller, using a hoe to hit him multiple times on the head. The hoe was then used to knock Witheridge unconscious, after which the defendants used force to hold her down and took turns raping her, before killing her with the hoe. There were no known eyewitnesses to the murders.

The defence claimed that the investigation was flawed due to mishandling of forensic evidence, lack of legal representation during interrogations, use of threats and intimidation to secure a confession, and intimidation of witnesses. They argued that the defendants, since they were vulnerable as illegal migrant workers, were scapegoated by the police for the crime. The defence provided a separate explanation for the events on the night. It was said the pair went swimming on the same beach earlier that night, and when they got out of the water they found their clothes had disappeared. After unsuccessfully trying to find their possessions, they walked towards Mau Mau's house through the shortcut, which resulted in them being caught on CCTV. They said Wai Phyo found the mobile phone dropped on the beach, and so he kept it. Ostensibly, Wai Phyo changed jobs at the end of September and was travelling by boat to Surat Thani for his new job on the day he was arrested. The defence struggled to find members of the public willing to testify at the trial, as many feared retribution, hence their alibi was not considered convincing by the court.

On July 10, the court ordered the DNA to be retested. Police revealed that the samples from Witheridge's body were used up, but were able to provide DNA samples from the murder weapon. The head of the country's Central Institute of Forensic Science found that the DNA on the hoe did not match the defendants.

The prosecution also claimed the defendants entered the country in violation of the Immigration Act of 1979. Zaw Lin was said to have entered between 2011 and 2012, and Wai Phyo in 2012. Both entered through the Ranong Province, allegedly without presenting themselves at a port of entry and without possessing a passport. They pled not guilty to the charge at the trial, but Wai Phyo changed his plea to guilty during the proceedings.

Several CCTV cameras near the crime scene were reported to be nonfunctional, and cameras near the pier were not checked by the police. The DNA analysis in the case, which was not subject to independent oversight or verification, was provided to the court as a one-page summary with four supporting pages, some of it handwritten with amendments. Jane Taupin, an Australian forensic scientist brought in by the defence, claimed that the timeline of DNA extraction was dubious; a rapid analysis of DNA samples had happened in less than 12 hours, which she said was unusual because "extracting DNA from mixed samples was difficult and time-consuming". Taupin was ultimately not allowed to testify by the defence, and these issues were not raised by the defence until their closing statement. Media reports speculated that was because the defence was wary of calling on foreign experts fearing it could appear as undermining the Thai justice system, and could bias the judges against their case.

On 24 December 2015, Zaw Lin and Wai Phyo were found guilty of murdering Witheridge and Miller by the three judges, and were sentenced to death. The conviction was primarily guided by the DNA evidence, and the court said it did not consider their confessions in making the judgment. Wai Phyo was also convicted of theft for allegedly stealing a phone and sunglasses from Miller's body. They were both also charged with entering the country illegally, to which Wai Phyo had already confessed. Zaw Lin was not convicted of this charge because he held a work permit for the two years preceding the murders.

A lawyer for the men, Nakhon Chomphuchat, said "we will appeal as soon as we can, we have just got a copy of the court's verdict. It will take a bit of time to find loopholes to appeal." Attempts to appeal the sentence to the High Court in 2017 were unsuccessful. The Supreme Court of Thailand upheld the sentence in August 2019, stating that the police handled the case correctly and the forensic evidence was "clear, credible, and detailed".

The death sentences were commuted to life imprisonment on 14 August 2020 following a royal decree to commemorate King Vajiralongkorn's birthday and "illustrate the king's clemency". The commutation was acknowledged by Miller's family.

== Reaction ==
The investigation was met with criticism by international media, human rights groups, and legal experts. Amnesty International stated that Thailand "must initiate an independent, effective and transparent investigation into mounting allegations of torture and other ill-treatment by police". They also raised concerns with the absence of legal counsel prior to the confession, as well as difficulties with translation and interpretation. Human Rights Watch said the case was "profoundly disturbing" and called for the verdict to be reviewed in a "transparent and fair appeal process". Thailand's National Human Rights Commission said "the circumstances surrounding the arrest of the two Myanmar workers ... were dubious, leading to impressions the suspects were not aware of their rights and that justice had not been done".

The International Commission of Jurists said "the defense must be afforded adequate time and facilities to explore whether the alleged destruction of evidence in this case was appropriate and unavoidable, and to test the prosecution case overall." Many raised concerns that contamination cast doubt upon the forensic evidence: officials, journalists and tourists were seen walking around the crime scene, and Thai police did not use trained or independent specialists to collect forensic evidence. Pornthip Rojanasunand, a Thai forensic scientist, testified at the trial that the crime scene was poorly managed. An Australian defence lawyer, Felicity Gerry QC, said the trial was "far too rushed and unfair to the defense". Experts have considered the forensic investigation to have been incompetent, and to have possibly framed the suspects.

An opinion piece in Bangkok Post wrote that "practically no one believes [Zaw Lin and Wai Phyo] really brutally murdered English tourists", adding "in Thai media of all kinds, the consensus is that Win and Zaw Lin are scapegoats." Another commentary in the paper stated that the "overwhelming public skepticism ... stems from the police's longstanding notoriety for arresting poor and powerless scapegoats to save rich criminals who can afford to buy their innocence". Rumours began to circulate, with residents on the island saying the island is controlled by a mafia who "have information about the true culprits", and claimed that the police is covering for them.

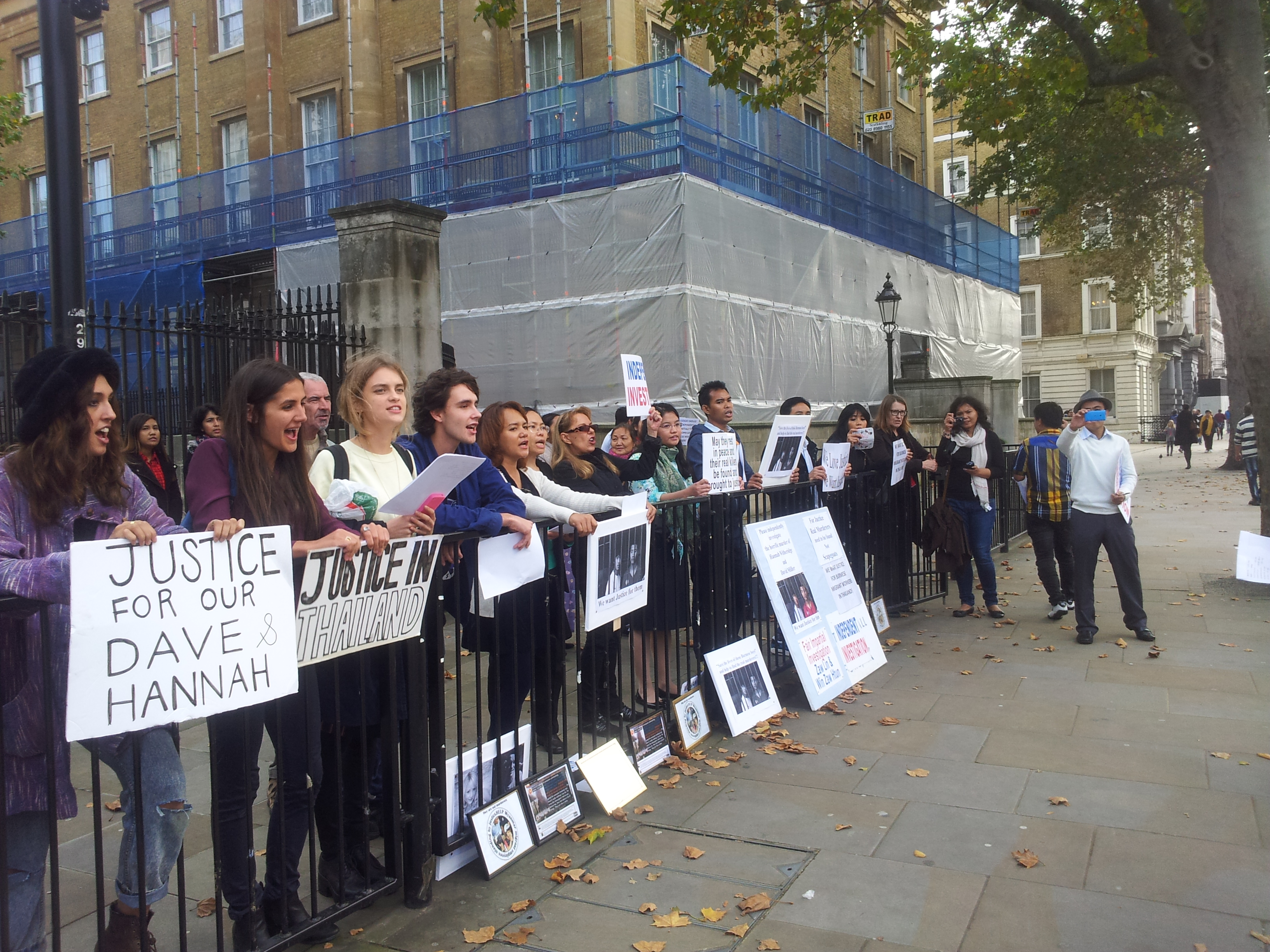
An October 2014 protest in London calling for an independent investigation by the British government

The Prime Minister of Thailand, Prayut Chan-o-cha, said "[foreign female tourists] think our country is beautiful and safe and they can do whatever they want, wear bikinis wherever they like. I'm asking if they wear bikinis in Thailand, will they be safe? Only if they are not beautiful." He later apologised for the comment after it was met with public backlash. The UK government expressed concerns with the investigation, and summoned a Thai diplomat in London to discuss them. Despite not initially being permitted to assist with the investigation, British police observers – including homicide detectives from the Metropolitan Police and a forensics expert – were eventually permitted into Thailand to observe the investigation. The team were only allowed to spend two hours on Koh Tao and did not meet with the suspects or defence. Their findings were never made public, but were shared with the families of the victims. Prayut said that British and Burmese government representatives were "limited to observation" and had to "respect our processes".

The guilty verdict resulted in widespread protests in Myanmar. Protesters called for the release of the two suspects, who they believed were innocent and scapegoated for the crime. The protests angered Thailand's prime minister, who believed the demonstrations were a plot "instigated" to hurt the government. He announced that he had "ordered all security-related agencies ... to track down those who are behind the Myanmar demonstrations". Hacker group Anonymous published a video on 3 January 2016 criticising the verdict. Police and court systems were hacked or taken offline in the following days, and a stash of personal information obtained from the court's servers was posted publicly.

The 2014 murders, along with other deaths and disappearances of tourists, led to British tabloids labelling Koh Tao as "Death Island". A 2016 study said the case, which it described as a litmus test of Thailand's justice system, "seriously damaged the image of Thailand and of its forces of law and order on the global level".

== Effects on tourism ==
Thailand's government became concerned the murders might affect tourism to the country. The country's prime minister, who had been phoning the national police chief daily for updates on the investigation, said "this should not have happened at all, as it will affect Thailand in the eyes of the international community". Amid the investigation, Tourism and Sports Minister Kobkarn Wattanavrangkul visited Koh Tao on 28 September 2014 in an attempt to reassure tourists. She suggested using identification wristbands for tourists to improve safety, but the idea was quickly scrapped. The mayor of the island, Chaiyan Turasakul, announced a new police station and staffed it with 40 full-time officers, compared to five previously. Irregular Burmese migrant workers were now required to register with the police in an attempt to discourage illegal workers and prevent bribery.

Although tourist arrivals to Koh Tao dropped in the months immediately following the murders, there was little lasting effect on tourism to the island.
