= Violence against women in Thailand =

Violence against women in Thailand includes but is not limited to domestic violence, rape, sex trafficking, and murder. Violence against women impacts the individual as well as the family in long-term psychological and physical manners.

Gender traditionalism and other Thai cultural values and practices in Thailand shape and perpetuate violence against women in Thailand.

== Types of violence ==
=== Domestic violence ===
In 2013, the Ministry of Public Health reported 31,866 domestic violence cases in Thailand. The World Health Organization (WHO) recognizes domestic violence in intimate partner relationships where there is emotion, physical, and/or sexual abuse. According to a study conducted in 2005 by the WHO, 1 in 6 Thai women in heterosexual intimate partner relationships have experienced or encountered domestic violence in their lifetime. The percentage of Thai women who experienced domestic violence in this study is significantly higher than the 2.9% that a 2009 study conducted by the Reproductive Health Survey in 2009 found. However, the 2009 study only asked one question about physical partner violence versus the several questions asked in the WHO survey. Overall, this study concluded that domestic violence is a serious problem and public health issue that should be addressed by Thai society since its findings determined that the effects of domestic violence impact Thai women's overall quality of life and extend beyond the realm of health. The study surveyed Thai women in central, southern, northern, and northeastern Thailand through simple random sampling. The study reported that there are three forms of domestic violence: psychological, physical, and sexual.

Lower socioeconomic income of Thai women in relationships and their decision-making power in relationships have a positive correlation to higher chances of domestic violence.

==== Psychological and physical ====
According to the study conducted by the WHO in 2005, 60-68% of the Thai women who have faced domestic violence reported to have experienced psychological violence. These violences included being insulted or made to feel bad, being humiliated or belittled, and being threatened to hurt.

52-65% of the Thai women who faced domestic violence reported to have experienced physical violence in 2005. These violent acts included being slapped or thrown, pushed or shoved, hit with a fist, kicked, dragged or beaten, burned, or threatened to use a weapon.

==== Sexual ====
62-63% of Thai women who have experienced domestic violence reported to have experienced sexual violence in 2005. These acts included being physically forced to have sex, sexual intercourse prompted by fear, being forced to do degrading or humiliating sexual activity. In 2017, a study approved by the Ethics Review Committee for Research Involving Human Research Subject at Chulalongkorn University found that psychological and physical violence were actually more prevalent than sexual violence. This difference in results between 2005 and 2017 can be due to new policies and campaigns against domestic violence launched in Thailand in the past 10 years before the study was conducted. In 2007, criminal law B.E. 2550 section 276 shifted its language surrounding who can legally be considered a victim of sexual assault/abuse. The language before 2007 stated, "any person who commits sexual intercourse with a woman who is not his wife, and against the latter's will, by threatening her, or doing any act of violence..., shall be punished to imprisonment..." The law omitted the phrase "with a woman who is not his wife", in order to legally recognize victims of sexual assault or abuse whose rapist was their husband.

=== Rape ===
According to statistics provided by the Royal Thai Police, there were 2,535 rape cases reported in 2017. While this number was lower than the 3,240 rape cases reported in 2015, there was a significant rise from the 2,109 rape cases reported in 2016. In an effort to raise awareness surrounding rape and sexual assault and to reduce its frequency, the Crime Suppression Division or CSD recognized rapists in Thailand as "No.1 public enemy". According to the literature, rape in Thailand is typically characterized as a violent act done onto women by men. However, in 2019, the CSD chief, Pol Maj Gen Jirabhop, reported that in recent years, reported rapes have been more varied. Jirabhop mentioned many rape victims are under-aged and some rapes are even being committed by monks. In a 2016 Op-Ed column written in the Bangkok Post, Paisarn Likhitpreechakul mentioned that many lesbian women in Thailand are raped as a corrective "cure" to their sexual orientation.

== Impact ==
=== On individuals ===
In 2017, 29% of women who are victims of domestic violence reported that they were hospitalized as consequence of domestic violence. 26.1% were forced to have sexual intercourse after fighting/arguing with their partner. 46.7% of women who are victims of domestic violence in Thailand reported to have been physically injured. These injuries included cuts/bites (15.9%), scratch/bruises (74.8%), sprains (56.1%), burns/deep cuts (6.5%), broken eardrum or eye injuries (11.2%), and broken bones/teeth (6.5%). The impact of domestic violence against women in Thailand extends beyond physical injury. 61% of women who are victims of domestic violence reported that they could not concentrate at work following their experience(s) with domestic violence. 12.2% reported that they had to take a day's leave from work, 23.9% reported loss of confidence and low self-esteem, 12.2% reported they did not go to work because of shame, and 9.5% reported that their partner stalked them while at work.

=== On families ===
In 2017, 49.6% of women who experienced domestic violence reported that their children witnessed the violence. These women expressed their anxieties that their children would perpetuate the cycle of domestic violence in their lifetimes.

== Perpetuation of violence against women ==
=== Gender traditionalism ===
There are traditional socialized gender roles, and a patriarchal system that created and foster them, in Thailand. Two major sources of gender traditionalism are Thai Buddhism and traditional Thai family values.

==== Thai Buddhism ====
Buddhism is not Thailand's official religion, but 93% of the Thai population is Buddhist. Thailand's 2017 constitution mandates that the Thai government assists the Theravada school of Buddhism and guards Buddhism against all forms of desecration. Within Thai Buddhism, women are inherently inferior to men. Women's major role in Thai Buddhism is to provide support for monks (who are always men) and temple activities—this, along with providing offering, is one of the only ways for a woman to earn religious merit. Women's "lower karma" subjects them to a life of suffering from which they should endure with bravery so that they can eventually be reborn as a man in their next lifetime. Women in Thailand who've experienced domestic violence are often given advice from Buddhist monks to be patient and compassionate with their perpetrators as the victims' suffering is a product of bad karma from a past life.

==== Thai family values ====
In traditional Thai families, husbands are subjected to the role of head and master of the household. Wives are subjected to roles of being gentle, pure, obedient, and subordinate in relation to the husband. These roles can be traced back to eighteenth and nineteenth century legislation in Thailand that recognized wives as property of husbands that could be subjected to corporal punishment or sold.

More traditional Thai family values emphasize the dichotomy of public and private in Thailand. Families are encouraged by tradition to keep family conflicts and problems within the family in order to maintain family honor. Families are also encouraged by tradition to hide their expression of feelings and thoughts to others.

=== Thai television dramas (lakhon) ===
Rape and other forms of sexual violence are highly prevalent in Thai television dramas or lakhon, which are one of the main forms of domestic primetime television entertainment. Sexual violence is often portrayed in lakhon as being administered by then men as a justified act to women who misbehaved—especially in the "revenge" genre of lakhon. Sexual violence in lakhon are often justified in the show as consequence to bad karma or fate and gendered social punishment—painting the sexual violence as inevitable and ethical.
