= Property guardianship =

Arrangement for occupation of vacant properties

Property guardianship is an arrangement by which people are granted cheap accommodation in return for living flexibly, often in desirable locations and unusual properties such as former commercial buildings like pubs, offices, police stations and even historically important properties. By the guardians' continued occupation these properties that would otherwise be vacant cannot be occupied by squatters.

The guardians typically pay a licence fee below market "rental" prices. Property guardianship is often provided on a month-to-month basis. Guardians can give 28 days' notice at any time and so can the guardian company.

A 2019 decision of The London Property Tribunal found that guardians were able to use Rent Repayment Order (RRO) legislation to apply for their rent to be repaid when the property was not licensed as a House of Multiple Occupation (HMO).
