= British Physics Olympiad =

Competitions for physics students

BPhO
- British Physics Olympiad
- Formation: 1979
- Purpose: A qualifier for selection into UK physics team
- Headquarters: Denys Wilkinson Building
- Location: Oxford, United Kingdom
- Region served: United Kingdom
- Parent organization: International Physics Olympiad
- Website: www.bpho.org.uk

The British Physics Olympiad (BPhO) is a series of ten competitions in the study of physics for students in years 11–13 in the United Kingdom.

On a day-to-day basis, the BPhO is run by five committee members as well as a large team of volunteer physics teachers and academics from across the UK. The BPhO's administrative office is based in the Denys Wilkinson Building of the Department of Physics at the University of Oxford. The BPhO is a charitable trust.

== History ==
Founded in 1979, the BPhO has been used as a qualifier for selection into the UK Physics Team for the International Physics Olympiad. The organisation aims to encourage the study of physics through ten annual Physics and Astronomy & Astrophysics competitions. Competitions include: Round 1, Round 2, Physics Challenge (Year 13), Experimental Project, Intermediate Physics Challenge (Year 11), Senior Physics Challenge (Y12) and BAAO.

== BPhO Round 1 ==
The BPhO Round 1 is a two-sectioned paper consisting of Section A and Section B, both lasting for 1 hour and 20 minutes (+5 mins reading for section B). Section A has only one question, with many independent parts that test the candidate on a variety of topics in physics. Section A can be awarded a maximum of 50 marks, even though the total marks is higher than 50.

Section B consists of several questions, each question involves a more specific topic in physics. Candidates are required to choose 2 questions out of Section B. The maximum marks awarded is also 50.

== BPhO Round 2 ==
The second round consists of several questions, in which all should be attempted. Total time allowed for the exam is 3 hours.

== International Physics Olympiad ==
Following Round 2, the best students eligible to represent the UK at the International Physics Olympiad (IPhO) will be invited to attend the Training Camp. Problem solving skills will be developed, practical skills enhanced, as well as some coverage of new material (Thermodynamics, Relativity, etc.). At the Training Camp a practical exam is sat as well as a short Theory Paper. Five students (and a reserve) will be selected for further training. From May there will be mentoring by email to cover some topics and problems.
