= Stephen Frears =

British film director and producer (born 1941)

Sir Stephen Frears
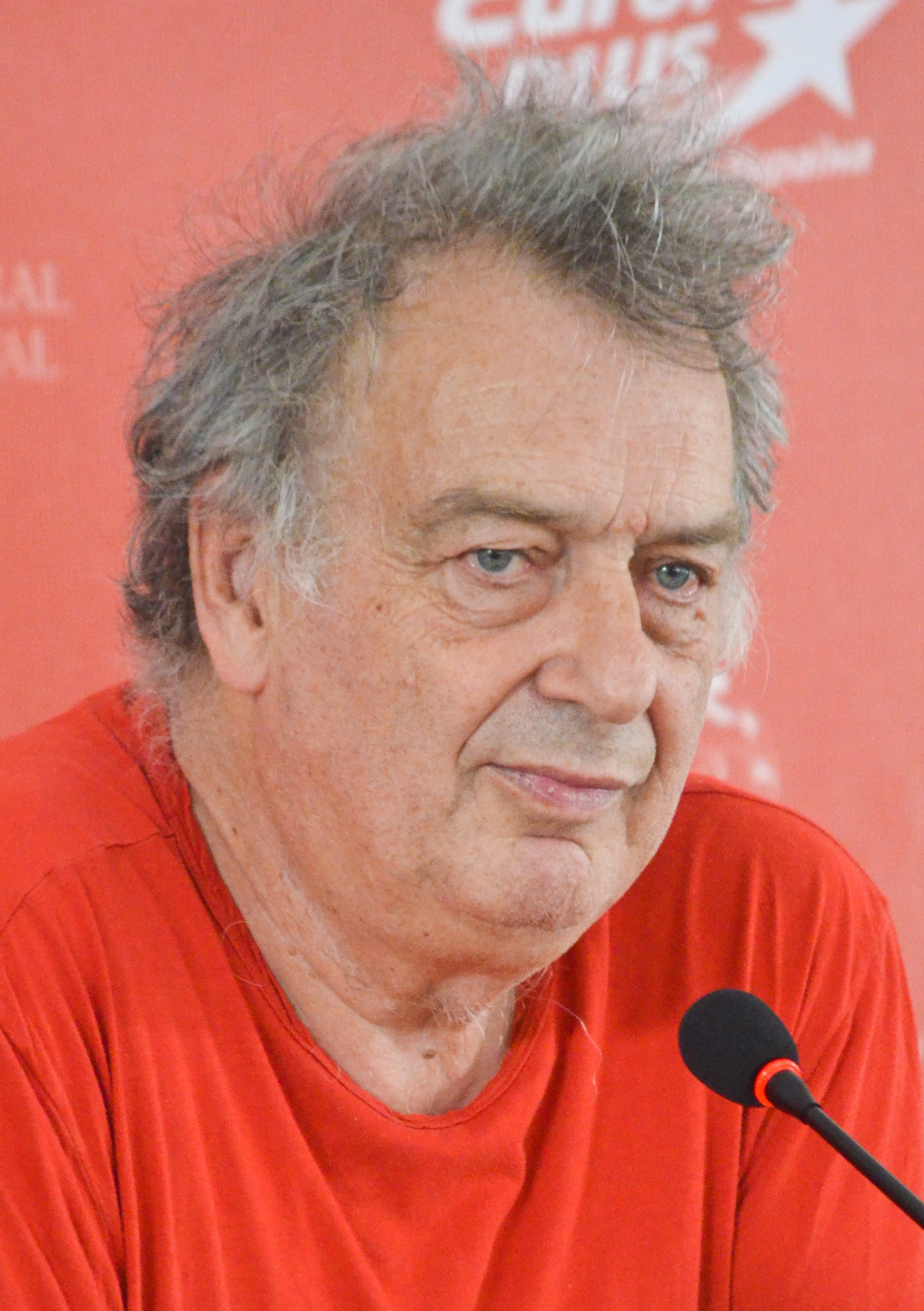
- Frears in 2014
- Born: Stephen Arthur Frears; 20 June 1941 (age 85); Leicester, England
- Education: Trinity College, Cambridge
- Occupations: Director; producer
- Years active: 1968–present
- Notable work: My Beautiful Laundrette; Prick Up Your Ears; Dangerous Liaisons; The Grifters; The Queen
- Television: Fail Safe; The Deal; Muhammad Ali's Greatest Fight; A Very English Scandal
- Spouses: Mary-Kay Wilmers (m. 1968, divorced); Anne Rothenstein (m. 1992)
- Children: 4

Sir Stephen Arthur Frears (born 20 June 1941) is a British director and producer of film and television, often depicting real-life stories as well as projects that explore social class through sharply-drawn characters. He has received numerous accolades including three BAFTA Awards, and a Primetime Emmy Award as well as nominations for two Academy Awards. In 2008, The Daily Telegraph named Frears among the 100 most influential people in British culture. In 2009, he received the Commandeur de l'Ordre des Arts et des Lettres. He received a knighthood in 2023 for his contributions to the film and television industries.

Born in Leicester and educated at Gresham's School in Norfolk and Trinity College, Cambridge, Frears started his career working as an assistant director in theatre and film while directing many television plays. Frears directed his debut feature film Gumshoe in 1971 and received critical acclaim for his films in the 1980s such as My Beautiful Laundrette (1985), Prick Up Your Ears (1987), and Dangerous Liaisons (1988). He also received two Academy Award nominations for directing The Grifters (1990) and The Queen (2006).

Frears is also known for his work on various television programmes, including the television films Fail Safe (2000), The Deal (2003), and Muhammad Ali's Greatest Fight (2013). He directed the Jeremy Thorpe BBC One biographical miniseries A Very English Scandal (2018), for which he earned a Primetime Emmy Award nomination.

== Early life and education ==
Frears was born on 20 June 1941 in Leicester, England. His mother, Ruth M. (née Danziger), was a social worker, and his father, Russell E. Frears, was a general practitioner and accountant. Frears was brought up Anglican. He did not learn that his mother was Jewish until he was in his late 20s.

From 1954 to 1959, Frears was educated at Gresham's School, an independent boarding school for boys (now co-educational) in the market town of Holt in Norfolk. This was followed by Trinity College, Cambridge, where he studied between 1960 and 1963, earning a BA degree in Law.

== Career ==
=== Early career ===
At the University of Cambridge, Frears was assistant stage manager for the 1963 Footlights Revue, which starred Tim Brooke-Taylor, John Cleese, Bill Oddie and David Hatch. After graduating from the university, Frears worked as an assistant director on the films Morgan – A Suitable Case for Treatment (1966), directed by Karel Reisz, and if.... (1968), directed by Lindsay Anderson. Frears also worked with Albert Finney on Charlie Bubbles (1968).

With Finney's company Memorial Productions, Frears made The Burning, a 31-minute adaptation of a short story by Roland Starke. Although set in South Africa, it was filmed in Tangier. It was released theatrically attached to François Truffaut's The Bride Wore Black.

Frears spent most of his early directing career in television, mainly for the BBC but also for the commercial sector. He contributed to several anthology series, such as the BBC's Play for Today. He also produced a series of Alan Bennett's plays for LWT, including The Old Crowd (1979, director: Lindsay Anderson). His directorial film debut was the noir detective spoof Gumshoe (1971).

=== 1980s ===
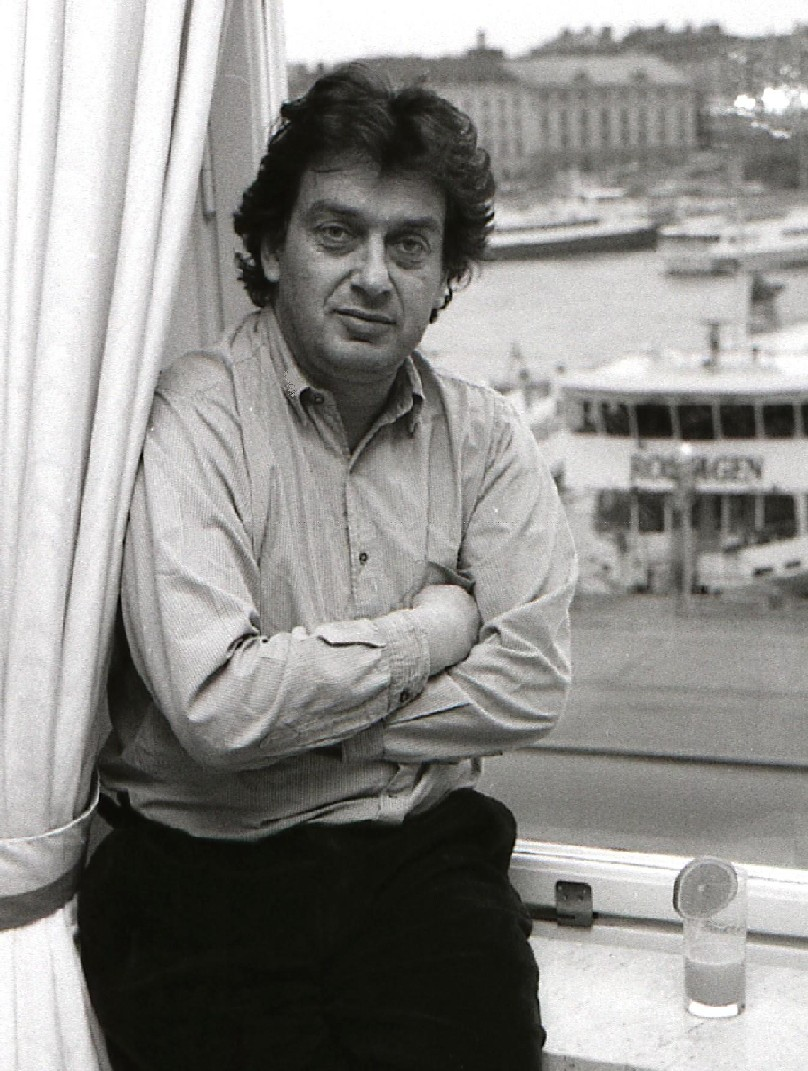
Frears in Sweden, 1989, promoting his film Dangerous Liaisons

In the late 1980s, Frears came to international attention as a director of feature films. In 1985, Frears found widespread acclaim with My Beautiful Laundrette. Based on Hanif Kureishi's screenplay, the film focuses on an interracial gay romance. It received an Academy Award nomination and two nominations for BAFTA Awards. The success of the film helped launch the careers of both Frears and actor Daniel Day-Lewis.

Frears worked with Adrian Edmondson on Mr Jolly Lives Next Door, starring Peter Cook and Nicholas Parsons as part of The Comic Strip Presents series of self-contained comedy TV films, this being one of the first in that strand to receive a limited theatrical release ahead of broadcast. It aired as a 45-minute programme on Channel Four in 1988. Frears had previously directed a nascent Comic Strip parody of TV show The Professionals in 1982/3, and another of Daphne Du Maurier's 1938 novel Rebecca starring French and Saunders, Consuela in 1985, this formed the first of the duo's parody films for which they became well known.

Frears next directed the Joe Orton biopic Prick Up Your Ears (1987), a collaboration with playwright Alan Bennett. His second film adapted from a Kureishi screenplay was Sammy and Rosie Get Laid (1987).

In 1988, Frears directed Dangerous Liaisons to widespread critical acclaim. The film was shot in France, with a cast that included Americans Glenn Close, John Malkovich, and Michelle Pfeiffer, and Uma Thurman. Based on the late 18th-century French novel of romantic game-playing and adapted by Christopher Hampton, the film received seven Academy Award nominations. These included for Best Picture and Best Actress for Glenn Close and Best Supporting Actress for Michelle Pfeiffer. The film also received ten British Academy Film Award nominations, including for Frears for Best Direction.

In 1989, Frears directed an advert for Diet Coke featuring English singer George Michael. It was shot on location in Spain and Madison Square Gardens, New York City with 3,000 extras. There were two TV spots released with the first during the American Music Awards on January 29, 1989. The 90-second advert compared the high-risk pressure of a pop star facing an audience to a Bullfighter preparing for a life-and-death struggle in the bullring. A shorter edited 30-second version was produced.

=== 1990s ===
In 1990, Frears directed the neo-noir crime thriller The Grifters, starring John Cusack, Anjelica Huston, and Annette Bening. Martin Scorsese served as a producer on the film. The film won the Independent Spirit Award for Best Film, and was declared one of the Top 10 films of 1990 by The National Board of Review of Motion Pictures. Frears was also nominated for the US Academy Award for Best Director.

In 1992, Frears directed the comedy drama Hero, released in the United Kingdom as Accidental Hero. The film starred Dustin Hoffman, Geena Davis, Andy Garcia, and Joan Cusack. Many critics compared the film to those of Preston Sturges and Frank Capra, as did Roger Ebert, who wrote, "It [the film] has all the ingredients for a terrific entertainment, but it lingers over the kinds of details that belong in a different kind of movie. It comes out of the tradition of those rat-a-tat Preston Sturges comedies of the 1940s." While the film was met with generally positive critical reviews, it was not a box office success. Columbia Pictures lost $25.6 million.

Frears has also directed two films adapted from novels by Roddy Doyle, The Snapper (1993) and The Van (1996). Frears's other films include the horror film Mary Reilly and the Western The Hi-Lo Country (1998).

=== 2000s ===
In 2000, Frears directed High Fidelity starring John Cusack, Jack Black, Lisa Bonet, and Joan Cusack. The film is based on the 1995 British novel of the same name by Nick Hornby. It is set in Chicago rather than London, and the name of the lead character was changed. After seeing the film, Hornby expressed his happiness with Cusack's performance, saying that "at times, it appears to be a film in which John Cusack reads my book".

The film received positive reviews from critics and has a score of 91% on Rotten Tomatoes, based on 165 reviews, with an average rating of 7.7/10. The critical consensus states: "The deft hand of director Stephen Frears and strong performances by the ensemble cast combine to tell an entertaining story with a rock-solid soundtrack."

In 2002, Frears directed social thriller, Dirty Pretty Things, a film about two immigrants living in London. The film starred Audrey Tautou, and Chiwetel Ejiofor. The film was nominated for an Academy Award for Best Original Screenplay. It won a British Independent Film Award for Best Independent British Film in 2003. For his performance as Okwe, Chiwetel Ejiofor won the 2003 British Independent Film Award for Best Actor.

In 2003, Frears was attached to direct the James Bond spin-off Jinx, featuring Halle Berry as her character from Die Another Day (2002) co-starring with Michael Madsen and Javier Bardem. Neal Purvis and Robert Wade were scheduled to return to write the screenplay, and Wade described it as "a very atmospheric, Euro thriller, a Bourne-type movie". Producer Barbara Broccoli described it as the beginning of a "Winter Olympics"-style alternative to the conventional Bond films. However, the project was cancelled due to "creative differences" between Eon Productions and MGM, and in order to focus on the reboot of the series with Casino Royale (2006).

In 2003, Frears returned to directing for television with The Deal (2003), which depicts an alleged deal between Tony Blair and Gordon Brown over which of them should become leader of the Labour Party in 1994. Michael Sheen portrayed Tony Blair to great acclaim. In 2005, Frears directed the British theatre comedy Mrs Henderson Presents starring Judi Dench, Bob Hoskins. The film was praised for its performances by Dench and Hoskins, with Dench receiving an Academy Award nomination for Best Actress.

Frears's next film project was The Queen (2006), a film that depicts the death of Princess Diana on 31 August 1997, and the reaction of members of the monarchy and the public. The film premiered at the Venice Film Festival, where Mirren won Best Actress and Peter Morgan won Best Screenplay. Frears was nominated for the Golden Lion. When released within the United States, the film achieved box-office success and awards. At the Academy Awards, Frears received his second Academy Award nomination for best direction. Helen Mirren won numerous awards for playing the title role, including the Academy Award for Best Actress.

In 2007 he served as jury president at the 2007 Cannes Film Festival. The jury awarded that year's Palme d'Or to the film 4 Months, 3 Weeks and 2 Days. Frears later said that he thought they had given the award to the right film, but that it had not been a unanimous decision by the jury. During an interview with the BBC, Frears also made derogatory comments about some of the female jury members - who included Maggie Cheung, Toni Collette, Maria de Medeiros and Sarah Polley - in which he described them as "a few bolshy women."

=== 2010s ===
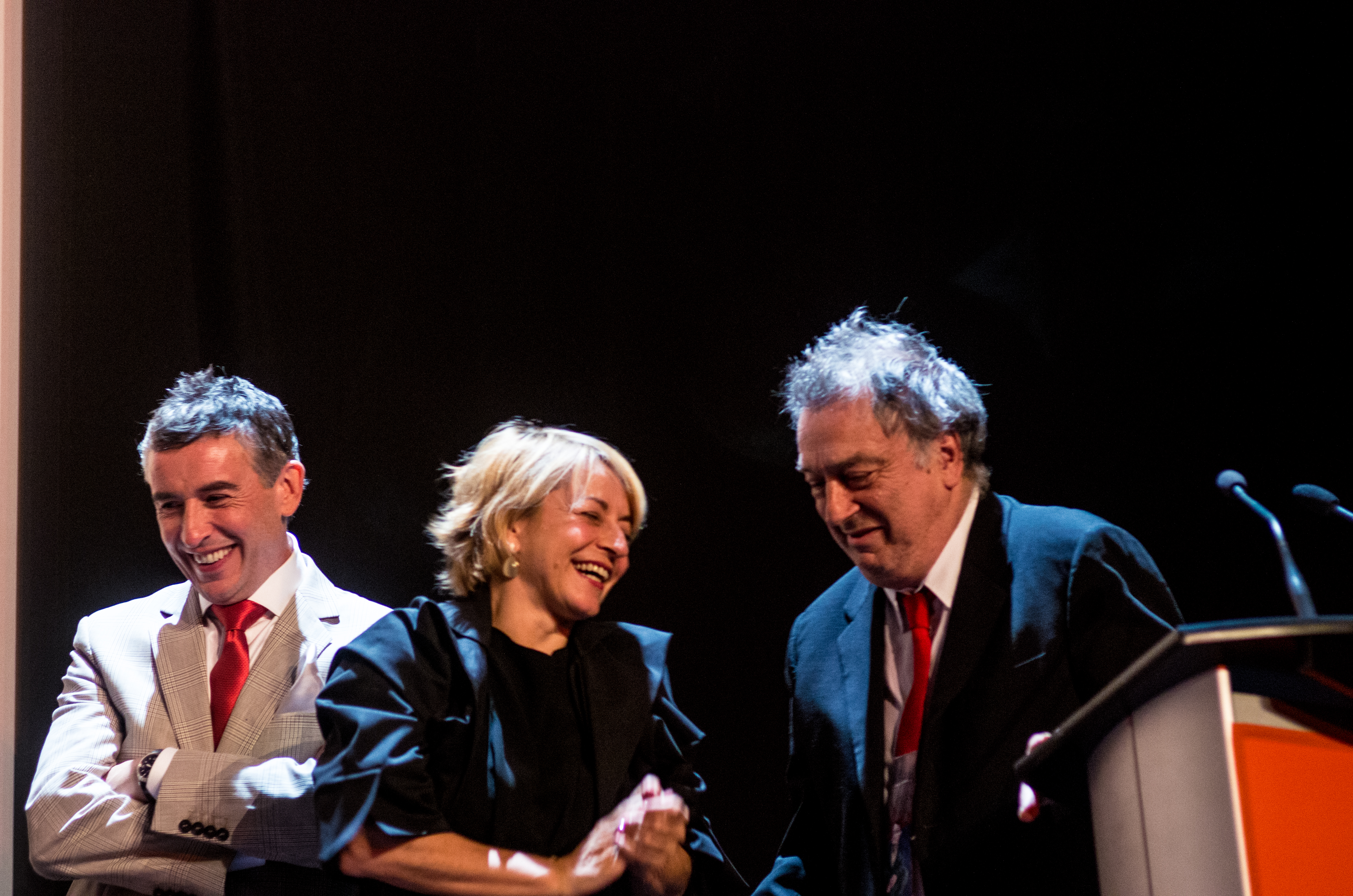
Steve Coogan with Frears at a screening of Philomena in 2013

Frears holds the "David Lean Chair in Fiction Direction" at the National Film and Television School in Beaconsfield, where he teaches.

In 2013, Frears directed the drama, Philomena (2013), which was based on the book The Lost Child of Philomena Lee (2009) by journalist Martin Sixsmith. This explored the story of Philomena Lee's 50-year search for her son, who was taken from her when she was a young unwed mother at a Catholic convent, and adopted by an American family. It also recounted Sixsmith's efforts to help her find the son. The film starred Judi Dench and Steve Coogan.

The film premiered at the 70th Venice International Film Festival to great acclaim and writers Jeff Pope and Steve Coogan won the best screenplay award for the film. The film won the People's Choice Award Runner-Up prize at the 2013 Toronto International Film Festival. The film was nominated for four Oscars at the 86th Academy Awards: Best Picture, Best Adapted Screenplay, Best Actress (for Dench), and Best Original Score. It was also nominated for four British Academy Film Awards and three Golden Globe Awards. The same year, HBO released Frears's television drama Muhammad Ali's Greatest Fight, starring Christopher Plummer and Frank Langella. It explores the United States Supreme Court deliberation over banning Muhammad Ali from boxing for refusing to serve in the US Army during the Vietnam War.

Frears directed a biopic of cycling champion Lance Armstrong, The Program, starring Ben Foster, which premiered in the 2015 Toronto International Film Festival. Many of Frears's films are based on stories of living persons, but he has never sought to meet any of his subjects. National Life Stories conducted an oral history interview (C1316/07) with Stephen Frears in 2008 for its The Legacy of the English Stage Company collection held by the British Library.

In 2016, Frears directed the film, Florence Foster Jenkins, starring Meryl Streep. The title character is a New York heiress known as an aspiring opera singer despite her poor singing abilities. Hugh Grant plays her manager and long-time companion, St. Clair Bayfield. Other cast members include Simon Helberg, Rebecca Ferguson, and Nina Arianda. The film was a critical and commercial success, with many praising Streep and Grant for their performances.

At the 89th Academy Awards, it was nominated for Best Costume Design and earned Streep her 20th nomination for Best Actress. It received four Golden Globe nominations, including Best Picture in a Comedy or Musical. In 2017, Frears reunited with Judi Dench, this time in Victoria & Abdul, about the real-life relationship between Queen Victoria of the United Kingdom and her Indian Muslim servant Abdul Karim. The film also stars Ali Fazal, Michael Gambon, Eddie Izzard, Tim Pigott-Smith (in his final film role), and Adeel Akhtar. The film had its world premiere at the 74th Venice Film Festival, and was theatrically released on 15 September 2017 in the United Kingdom. It has grossed more than $65 million worldwide.

In 2018, Frears returned to the limited series with A Very English Scandal, which premiered on BBC One and later on Amazon Prime. The project is a three-part 2018 British television comedy-drama miniseries based on John Preston's 2016 book of the same name. It is a dramatisation of the 1976–1979 Jeremy Thorpe scandal and more than 15 years of events leading up to it. The series stars Hugh Grant as the politician Jeremy Thorpe, and Ben Whishaw as his lover Norman Scott. The limited series gained great acclaim in both the United Kingdom and the United States. On Rotten Tomatoes, the series holds an approval rating of 97% based on 64 reviews, with an average rating of 9.05/10. Rotten Tomatoes's critical consensus reads, "Hugh Grant and Ben Whishaw impress in A Very English Scandal, an equally absorbing and appalling look at British politics and society". Grant received Primetime Emmy Award, Screen Actors Guild Award, Golden Globe Award, British Academy Television Award, and Critics Choice Award nominations for his performance while Whishaw earned an Emmy, and BAFTA win.

In 2022, it was reported that Frears would be directing a film about Billy Wilder titled Wilder & Me. An adaptation by Christopher Hampton of the novel Mr Wilder and Me (2020) by Jonathan Coe, the film is scheduled to begin shooting in early 2025, produced by Jeremy Thomas.

== Personal life ==
In 1968, Frears married Mary-Kay Wilmers, with whom he had two sons, Sam and Will. The couple divorced in the early 1970s. Will Frears became a stage and film director.

Early in his career, Frears made a programme featuring the band the Scaffold. He is name-checked ("Mr Frears had sticky-out ears...") in their hit song "Lily the Pink".

As of 2002 Frears lived in London with Anne Rothenstein and their two children.

Frears was knighted in the 2023 Birthday Honours for services to film and television.

== Political views ==
A convinced republican, in April 2015, Frears was one of several celebrities who endorsed the parliamentary candidacy of Caroline Lucas at the 2015 general election, but not other Green Party candidates.

In December 2019, along with 42 other leading cultural figures, Frears signed a letter endorsing the Labour Party under Jeremy Corbyn's leadership in the 2019 general election.

== Filmography ==
=== Film ===
Year	Title	Distributor
1968	The Burning (short film)	BFI
1971	Gumshoe	Columbia Pictures
1984	The Hit	Palace Pictures
1985	My Beautiful Laundrette	Mainline Pictures
1987	Prick Up Your Ears	Curzon Film Distributors
1987	Sammy and Rosie Get Laid	Palace Pictures / Nelson Entertainment
1988	Dangerous Liaisons	Warner Bros.
1990	The Grifters	Miramax Films
1992	Hero	Columbia Pictures
1993	The Snapper	Electric Pictures
1996	Mary Reilly	TriStar Pictures
1996	The Van	Fox Searchlight Pictures
1998	The Hi-Lo Country	Gramercy Pictures / PolyGram Filmed Entertainment
2000	High Fidelity	Touchstone Pictures / Buena Vista Pictures
2000	Liam	Artificial Eye / Lions Gate Films
2002	Dirty Pretty Things	Miramax Films / Buena Vista International
2005	Mrs Henderson Presents	Pathé
2006	The Queen	Pathé
2009	Chéri	Pathé / Warner Bros. Pictures
2010	Tamara Drewe	Momentum Pictures
2012	Lay the Favorite	Radius-TWC
2013	Philomena	Pathé
2015	The Program	StudioCanal
2016	Florence Foster Jenkins	20th Century Fox / Pathé
2017	Victoria & Abdul	Focus Features / Universal Pictures
2022	The Lost King	Pathé / Warner Bros. Pictures

=== Television ===
TV movies

Year	Title	Director	Notes
1969	Report: St - Ann's Nottingham (Documentary film)	Yes	No
1972	A Day Out	Yes	No
1973	The Cricket Match	Yes	No
1975	Daft as a Bush	Yes	No
1975	Three Men in a Boat	Yes	No
1977	Black Christmas	Yes	No
1978	Me! I'm Afraid of Virginia Woolf	Yes	Yes
1978	Doris and Doreen	Yes	Yes
1979	Afternoon Off	Yes	Yes
1979	One Fine Day	Yes	Yes
1980	Bloody Kids	Yes	No
1982	Walter	Yes	No
1983	Walter and June	Yes	No
1983	Saigon: Year of the Cat	Yes	No
1983	The Last Company Car	Yes	No
1984	December Flower	Yes	No
1987	Mr. Jolly Lives Next Door	Yes	No
1993	The Snapper	Yes	No
2000	Fail Safe	Yes	No
2003	The Deal	Yes	No
2014	Muhammad Ali's Greatest Fight	Yes	No

TV series

Year	Title	Notes
1969	Parkin's Patch	2 episodes
1969	Tom Grattan's War	5 episodes
1971–73	Follyfoot	4 episodes
1973	Full House	Episode: "#1.15"
1973	Sporting Scenes	Episode: "England, Their England"
1974	Second City Firsts	Episode: "Match of the Day"
1975	Play for Today	3 episodes
1976	BBC2 Playhouse	2 episodes
1977	ITV Play of the Week	2 episodes
1977	ITV Playhouse	2 episodes; also producer
1984	The Comic Strip Presents...	3 episodes
1986–93	Screen Two	2 episodes
2019–22	State of the Union	20 episodes; Also executive producer
2019	The Loudest Voice	Episode: "2015"

Miniseries

Year	Title	Director	Executive Producer	Ref.
2018	A Very English Scandal	Yes	Yes	
2020	Quiz	Yes	Yes	
2024	The Regime	Yes	Yes	

== Awards and honours ==
Over his career, Frears has amassed numerous awards and nominations, including two Academy Award nominations, four Primetime Emmy Award nominations (one win), a Golden Globe Award nomination, and 17 British Academy of Film and Television Arts Award nominations (three wins).

In 1990, Frears earned his first Academy Award nomination for directing the film The Grifters. In 2006, he earned his second nomination for The Queen. At the Primetime Emmy Awards, he was nominated for Fail Safe (2000), Muhammad Ali's Greatest Fight (2013), and A Very English Scandal (2019), before winning for State of the Union (2019). He has also been acknowledged by the Cannes, Berlin, Venice, and Toronto film festivals.

Honors include:

- 2006: Golden Eye Award for Lifetime Achievement at Zurich Film Festival
- 2009: Commandeur de l'Ordre des Arts et des Lettres
- 2014: Golden Duke for Lifetime Achievement of the 5th Odesa International Film Festival
- Honorary Associate of London Film School

Awards and nominations received for films directed by Frears
Year	Title	Academy Awards		BAFTA Awards		Golden Globe Awards	
Year	Title	Nominations	Wins	Nominations	Wins	Nominations	Wins
1971	Gumshoe			2			
1984	The Hit			1			
1985	My Beautiful Laundrette	1		2			
1987	Prick Up Your Ears			3		1	
1988	Dangerous Liaisons	7	3	10	2		
1990	The Grifters	4		1		1	
2000	High Fidelity			1		1	
2002	Dirty Pretty Things	1		2			
2005	Mrs Henderson Presents	2		4		3	
2006	The Queen	6	1	10	2	4	2
2013	Philomena	4		4		3	
2016	Florence Foster Jenkins	2		4	1	4	
2017	Victoria & Abdul	2		1		1	
Total		29	4	45	5	18	2

Directed Academy Award performances
Under Frears' direction, these actors have received Academy Award nominations (and wins) for their performances in their respective roles.

Year	Performer	Film	Result
Academy Award for Best Actress
1988	Glenn Close	Dangerous Liaisons	Nominated
1990	Anjelica Huston	The Grifters	Nominated
2005	Judi Dench	Mrs Henderson Presents	Nominated
2006	Helen Mirren	The Queen	Won
2013	Judi Dench	Philomena	Nominated
2016	Meryl Streep	Florence Foster Jenkins	Nominated
Academy Award for Best Supporting Actress
1988	Michelle Pfeiffer	Dangerous Liaisons	Nominated
1990	Annette Bening	The Grifters	Nominated

== See also ==
- List of Academy Award winners and nominees from Great Britain
- List of Primetime Emmy Award winners
