= A Very English Scandal (TV series) =

2018 British TV drama series

- Promotional poster
- Genre: Historical drama; Comedy drama
- Based on: A Very English Scandal by John Preston
- Written by: Russell T Davies
- Directed by: Stephen Frears
- Starring: Hugh Grant; Ben Whishaw
- Composer: Murray Gold
- Country of origin: United Kingdom
- Original language: English
- No. of episodes: 3

Production
- Executive producers: Dominic Treadwell-Collins; Graham Broadbent; Pete Czernin; Diarmuid McKeown; Russell T Davies; Stephen Frears; Lucy Richer
- Producer: Dan Winch
- Editor: Pia Di Ciaula
- Running time: 55–58 minutes
- Production company: Blueprint Television

Original release
- Network: BBC One
- Release: 20 May – 3 June 2018

Related
- A Very British Scandal; A Very Royal Scandal

A Very English Scandal is a 2018 British three-part historical drama created and written by Russell T Davies, based on John Preston's 2016 book of the same name. It is a dramatisation of the 1976–1979 Thorpe affair and 18 years of events leading up to it.

The producers followed up A Very English Scandal in 2021 with the series A Very British Scandal, about the Argyll divorce case. On 20 November 2023, it was announced Blueprint would produce a third Scandal series, A Very Royal Scandal, based on the infamous Prince Andrew interview with Emily Maitlis.

== Plot summary ==
In 1965, Jeremy Thorpe, a Liberal MP, faces blackmail from his unstable ex-lover, Norman Josiffe, whom he met in 1961. After years of a tumultuous relationship, Thorpe grows tired of Norman and severs ties with him. Norman, unable to keep a job and with a penchant for drama, threatens to expose their homosexual affair. Thorpe's fellow MP, Peter Bessell, silences Norman with money, but Thorpe refuses to help him get a new National Insurance card.

By 1968, Thorpe becomes the youngest-ever Liberal Party leader, marries Caroline Allpass, and has a baby. Norman, now known as Norman Scott, is increasingly erratic and contacts Caroline, revealing his past with Thorpe, which shocks her. Caroline dies in a car crash in 1970, and Thorpe is devastated. Meanwhile, Bessell flees to the United States to avoid financial troubles.

Norman continues his attempts to get a new National Insurance card and to expose Thorpe. Thorpe, now married to Marion Stein, considers having Norman killed. In 1973, an attempt to silence Norman fails when Andrew Newton kills Norman’s dog instead. Norman reports the crime, and Thorpe’s involvement is suspected.

The resulting 1976–79 Thorpe affair sees Thorpe resign as Leader of the Liberal Party and lose his seat at the 1979 UK general election. Thorpe and his co-conspirators are tried for attempted murder, but they are acquitted. Thorpe's political career ends, and he never holds public office again. He remains married to Marion until her death on 6 March 2014, and he dies about nine months later on 4 December during the same year. Bessell dies in 1985, and Norman, still without a National Insurance card, lives with 11 dogs.

== Cast and characters ==
- Hugh Grant as Jeremy Thorpe
- Ben Whishaw as Norman Josiffe/Norman Scott
- Alex Jennings as Peter Bessell
- Patricia Hodge as Ursula Thorpe
- Monica Dolan as Marion Thorpe
- Paul Hilton as David Holmes
- Jonathan Hyde as David Napley
- Eve Myles as Gwen Parry-Jones
- David Bamber as Arthur Gore, 8th Earl of Arran
- Jason Watkins as Emlyn Hooson
- Blake Harrison as Andrew Newton
- Michelle Fox as Lyn
- Adrian Scarborough as George Carman
- Michele Dotrice as Edna Friendship
- Alice Orr-Ewing as Caroline Allpass
- Michael Culkin as Reggie Maudling
- Susan Wooldridge as Fiona Gore, Countess of Arran
- Anthony O'Donnell as Leo Abse
- Naomi Battrick as Diana Stainton
- Dyfan Dwyfor as George Deakin
- Daryl McCormack as Luke MacKenzie

== Episodes ==
No.	Title	Directed by	Written by	Original release date	U.K. viewers (millions)
1	"Episode 1"	Stephen Frears	Russell T Davies	20 May 2018	5.93
2	"Episode 2"	Stephen Frears	Russell T Davies	27 May 2018	5.14
3	"Episode 3"	Stephen Frears	Russell T Davies	3 June 2018	5.80

== Production ==
=== Development ===
The first series was written by Russell T Davies and directed by Stephen Frears, with Hugh Grant starring as Thorpe and Ben Whishaw as Scott. The BBC television drama was first announced on 4 May 2017, with Grant already cast as Thorpe. Ben Whishaw was announced to join the cast in August, and the rest of the cast was announced in October. Along with the further casting announcement, Amazon took the US rights for the show.

=== Filming ===
Filming took place in London, Manchester, Buckinghamshire, Devon, Hertfordshire and South Wales. Although scenes were filmed outside the Houses of Parliament, the inner courts, interior hallways and staircase were represented by Manchester Town Hall, which is built in the same Gothic Revival style as the Palace of Westminster. The offices of Thorpe and other MPs were created at Bulstrode Park, a vacant country house in Buckinghamshire. The grounds of Bulstrode were also used for the night-time assassination attempt scene set on Exmoor.

The town of Hertford was used as a stand-in for 1970s Barnstaple, while Saunton Sands in North Devon stood in for the California beach where Peter Bessell (Alex Jennings) lives in a seaside shack. Bridgend in South Wales stood in for Dublin, while Norman's period living in Wales was filmed in and around Monknash, in south Wales. The show was able to film in the lobby and exterior of the Old Bailey in London, where the show's climactic scenes take place. A Very English Scandal was the first production ever to be granted permission to film in Court One of the Old Bailey, but they had to decline because of tight time restrictions and filmed the court scenes at a courthouse in Kingston upon Thames.

=== Release ===
The series premiered on BBC One on 20 May 2018 and on Amazon Prime on 29 June 2018. The DVD was released on 2 July 2018.

== Critical reception ==
A Very English Scandal received very positive reviews. On Rotten Tomatoes, it holds an approval rating of 97% based on 68 reviews, with an average rating of 8.80/10. Rotten Tomatoes's critical consensus reads, "Hugh Grant and Ben Whishaw impress in A Very English Scandal, an equally absorbing and appalling look at British politics and society". Metacritic gives the miniseries a weighted average rating of 84 out of 100, based on 17 critics, indicating "universal acclaim". In 2019, the series was ranked 76th on The Guardian's list of the 100 best TV shows of the 21st century.

Norman Scott spoke out about the show's characterisation of him and its portrayal of his life. He told the Irish News that "Artistic licence is fine but this isn't my story. And there's nothing funny about someone trying to kill you...I'm portrayed as this poor, mincing, little gay person ... I also come across as a weakling and I've never been a weakling".

=== Awards and nominations ===
Year	Award	Category	Nominee(s)	Result	Ref.
2018	British Society of Cinematographers	Best Cinematography in a Television Drama	Danny Cohen	Nominated	
2018	British Society of Cinematographers	Operators Award – Television Drama	Iain MacKay	Nominated	
2018	PinkNews Awards	Drama		Won	
2018	Rose d'Or	Limited Series and TV Movie		Won	
2019	Banff World Media Festival	Best Limited Series (Rockie Award)		Nominated	
2019	British Academy Cymru Awards	Best Writer	Russell T Davies	Won	
2019	British Academy Television Awards	Best Mini-Series	Russell T Davies, Stephen Frears, Dominic Treadwell-Collins, and Dan Winch	Nominated	
2019	British Academy Television Awards	Best Leading Actor	Hugh Grant	Nominated	
2019	British Academy Television Awards	Best Supporting Actor	Ben Whishaw	Won	
2019	British Academy Television Awards	Best Supporting Actress	Monica Dolan	Nominated	
2019	British Academy Television Craft Awards	Best Director – Fiction	Stephen Frears	Won	
2019	British Academy Television Craft Awards	Best Writer – Fiction	Russell T Davies	Nominated	
2019	British Academy Television Craft Awards	Best Costume Design	Suzanne Cave	Won	
2019	British Academy Television Craft Awards	Best Editing – Fiction	Pia Di Ciaula	Won	
2019	British Academy Television Craft Awards	Best Make Up and Hair Design	Daniel Phillips	Nominated	
2019	British Academy Television Craft Awards	Best Original Music	Murray Gold	Nominated	
2019	British Academy Television Craft Awards	Best Production Design	Helen Scott	Nominated	
2019	British Academy Television Craft Awards	Best Sound – Fiction	Sound Team	Nominated	
2019	Broadcast Awards	Best Drama Series or Serial		Won	
2019	Broadcasting Press Guild Awards	Best Single Drama/Mini-Series		Won	
2019	Broadcasting Press Guild Awards	Best Actor	Hugh Grant	Won	
2019	Broadcasting Press Guild Awards	Best Actor	Ben Whishaw	Nominated	
2019	Broadcasting Press Guild Awards	Best Writer	Russell T Davies	Won	
2019	Canadian Cinema Editors Awards	Best Editing in Television Movie or Mini-Series	Pia Di Ciaula	Nominated	
2019	Critics' Choice Television Awards	Best Limited Series		Nominated	
2019	Critics' Choice Television Awards	Best Actor in a Movie Made for Television or Limited Series	Hugh Grant	Nominated	
2019	Critics' Choice Television Awards	Best Supporting Actor in a Movie Made for Television or Limited Series	Ben Whishaw	Won	
2019	Dorian Awards	LGBTQ TV Show of the Year		Nominated	
2019	Dorian Awards	TV Performance of the Year — Actor	Hugh Grant	Nominated	
2019	Dorian Awards	TV Performance of the Year — Actor	Ben Whishaw	Nominated	
2019	GLAAD Media Awards	Outstanding TV Movie or Limited Series		Nominated	
2019	Golden Globe Awards	Best Limited Series or Television Film		Nominated	
2019	Golden Globe Awards	Best Actor – Limited Series or Television Film	Hugh Grant	Nominated	
2019	Golden Globe Awards	Best Supporting Actor – Series, Limited Series or Television Film	Ben Whishaw	Won	
2019	Golden Nymph Awards	Outstanding Long Fiction Program		Nominated	
2019	Golden Nymph Awards	Outstanding Actor in a Long Fiction Program	Hugh Grant	Nominated	
2019	Online Film & Television Association Awards	Best Actor in a Motion Picture or Limited Series	Hugh Grant	Nominated	
2019	Online Film & Television Association Awards	Best Supporting Actor in a Motion Picture or Limited Series	Ben Whishaw	Runner-up	
2019	Online Film & Television Association Awards	Best Writing of a Motion Picture or Limited Series		Nominated	
2019	Online Film & Television Association Awards	Best Costume Design in a Non-Series		Nominated	
2019	Primetime Emmy Awards	Outstanding Lead Actor in a Limited Series or Movie	Hugh Grant	Nominated	
2019	Primetime Emmy Awards	Outstanding Supporting Actor in a Limited Series or a Movie	Ben Whishaw	Won	
2019	Primetime Emmy Awards	Outstanding Directing for a Limited Series, Movie or Dramatic Special	Stephen Frears	Nominated	
2019	Primetime Emmy Awards	Outstanding Writing for a Limited Series, Movie or Dramatic Special	Russell T Davies	Nominated	
2019	Royal Television Society Awards	Best Mini-Series		Won	
2019	Royal Television Society Awards	Best Actor – Male	Ben Whishaw	Nominated	
2019	Royal Television Society Awards	Best Writer – Drama	Russell T Davies	Nominated	
2019	Royal Television Society Craft & Design Awards	Best Director – Drama	Stephen Frears	Won	
2019	Royal Television Society Craft & Design Awards	Best Editing – Drama	Pia Di Ciaula	Nominated	
2019	Royal Television Society Craft & Design Awards	Best Make Up Design – Drama	Daniel Phillips	Nominated	
2019	Royal Television Society Craft & Design Awards	Best Music – Original Score	Murray Gold	Won	
2019	Satellite Awards	Best Miniseries		Nominated	
2019	Satellite Awards	Best Actor in a Miniseries or a Motion Picture Made for Television	Hugh Grant	Nominated	
2019	Satellite Awards	Best Supporting Actor in a Series, Miniseries or a Motion Picture Made for Television	Ben Whishaw	Nominated	
2019	Screen Actors Guild Awards	Outstanding Performance by a Male Actor in a Miniseries or Television Movie	Hugh Grant	Nominated	
2019	South Bank Sky Arts Awards	TV Drama		Won	
2019	Television and Radio Industries Club Awards	Best Drama Programme		Won	
2019	USC Scripter Awards	Television	Russell T Davies; Based on the book by John Preston	Won	
2019	Writers' Guild of Great Britain Awards	Best Short Form TV Drama	Russell T Davies	Won	
