= Basil Brown =

British archaeologist and astronomer (1888–1977)

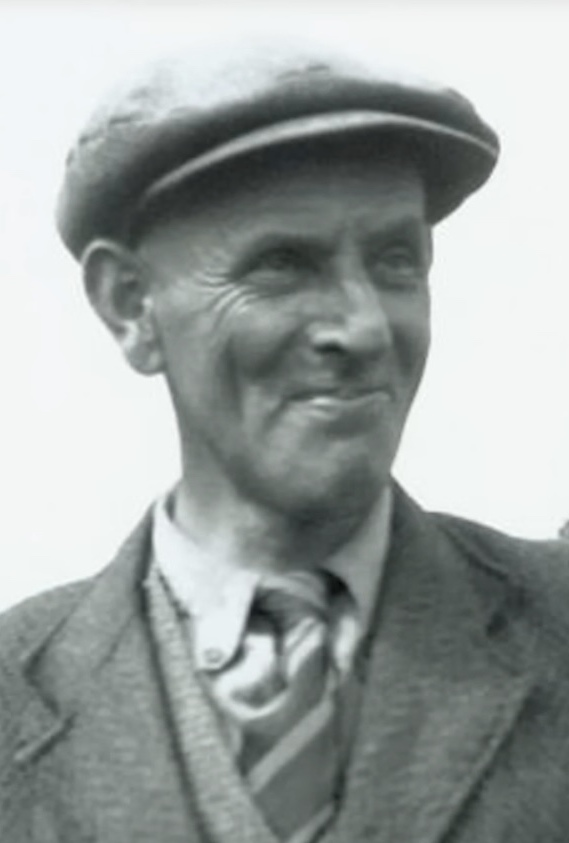
- Brown, c. 1939
- Born: Basil John Wait Brown; 22 January 1888; Bucklesham, Suffolk, England
- Died: 12 March 1977 (aged 89); Rickinghall, Suffolk, England
- Occupations: Archaeologist, astronomer
- Years active: 1932 to c. 1968
- Known for: Excavations at Sutton Hoo
- Spouse: Dorothy May Oldfield (m. 1923)

Basil John Wait Brown (22 January 1888 – 12 March 1977) was an English archaeologist and astronomer. Self-taught, he discovered and excavated a 6th-century Anglo-Saxon ship burial at Sutton Hoo in 1939, which has come to be called "one of the most important archaeological discoveries of all time". Although Brown was described as an amateur archaeologist, his career as a paid excavation employee for a provincial museum spanned more than thirty years.

== Early life ==
Basil Brown was born in 1888 in Bucklesham, east of Ipswich, to George Brown (1863–1932) and Charlotte Wait (c.1854–1931), daughter of John Wait of Great Barrington, Gloucestershire. His father was a farmer, wheelwright and agent for the Royal Insurance Company. Soon after his birth, the Browns moved to Church Farm near Rickinghall, where his father began work as a tenant farmer. From the age of five, Basil studied astronomical texts that he had inherited from his grandfather. He later attended Rickinghall School and also received some private tutoring. From an early age he could be found digging up fields. At 12 years old, he left school to work on his father's farm.

By attending evening classes, Brown earned a certificate in drawing in 1902. In 1907, he obtained diplomas with distinction for astronomy, geography and geology through studies with the Harmsworth Self-Educator correspondence college. Using textbooks and radio broadcasts, Brown taught himself Latin and learnt to speak French fluently, while also acquiring some knowledge of Greek, German and Spanish. Although declared medically unfit for war service at the outbreak of World War I, Brown served as a volunteer in the Suffolk Royal Army Medical Corps from 16 October 1918 to 31 October 1919. On 27 June 1923, Brown married Dorothy May Oldfield (14 May 1897 – 1983), a domestic servant and daughter of Robert Robin Oldfield, who worked as head carpenter on the Wramplingham estate. Basil and May lived and worked on his father's farm even after George Brown had died, with May assuming responsibility for a dairy. They struggled to make a living, partly through Brown's preoccupation with astronomy and partly due to the small size of the farm.

By 1934, the smallholding had become so unviable that Brown gave it up. From 1935, he had a semi-regular income from paid archaeological work, but at a lower wage of £1–10 shillings a week, less than the agricultural minimum wage, so that he had to continue working as an insurance agent. He also joined the police as a special constable.

In August 1935, the Browns rented a cottage named Cambria, The Street, Rickinghall, where they lived until their deaths, having purchased it in the 1950s.

== Astronomical work ==
On 27 November 1918, Brown joined the British Astronomical Association at the invitation of W. F. Denning and A. Grace Cook. Brown observed the final stages of the transit of Mercury early in the morning of 7 May 1924 with a 2" (50mm) aperture telescope. In the same year he published articles on astronomical mapping and cataloguing in The English Mechanic and World of Science magazine. To mark the centenary of the death of Stephen Groombridge, Brown published an article on him in the journal of the BAA in 1932. Also in 1932 Brown's Astronomical Atlases, Maps and Charts: An Historical and General Guide appeared in print; he had been working on it since 1928. Brown also observed meteors, the aurora and the zodiacal light for the BAA. However, in 1934 Brown's strained financial circumstances forced him to let his membership lapse. Astronomical Atlases was sufficiently popular to be reprinted in 1968, with his publisher describing it as "filling an inexplicable gap in the literature".

== Early archaeological career ==
In his spare time Brown continued to investigate the countryside in north Suffolk for Roman remains. Intrigued by the alignment of ancient sites, he used a compass and measurements to uncover eight medieval buildings (one at Burgate, where his father had been born), identified Roman settlements, and traced ancient roads.

His investigations of Roman industrial potteries led in 1934 to the discovery, excavation and successful removal to Ipswich Museum in 1935 of a Roman kiln at Wattisfield. In this way Brown got to know Guy Maynard, curator of the Museum (1920 to 1952) and H. A. Harris, secretary of the Suffolk Institute of Archaeology. He applied to Maynard to work for the museum on a contractual basis. His first contract with the Museum and the Suffolk Institute was for thirteen weeks of work in 1935 at Stuston and at Stanton Chare at £2 per week. At the latter site Brown discovered a Roman villa, leading to excavations that extended to three seasons of about thirty weeks in 1936–38 (until 1939, according to Maynard).

== Sutton Hoo excavations ==
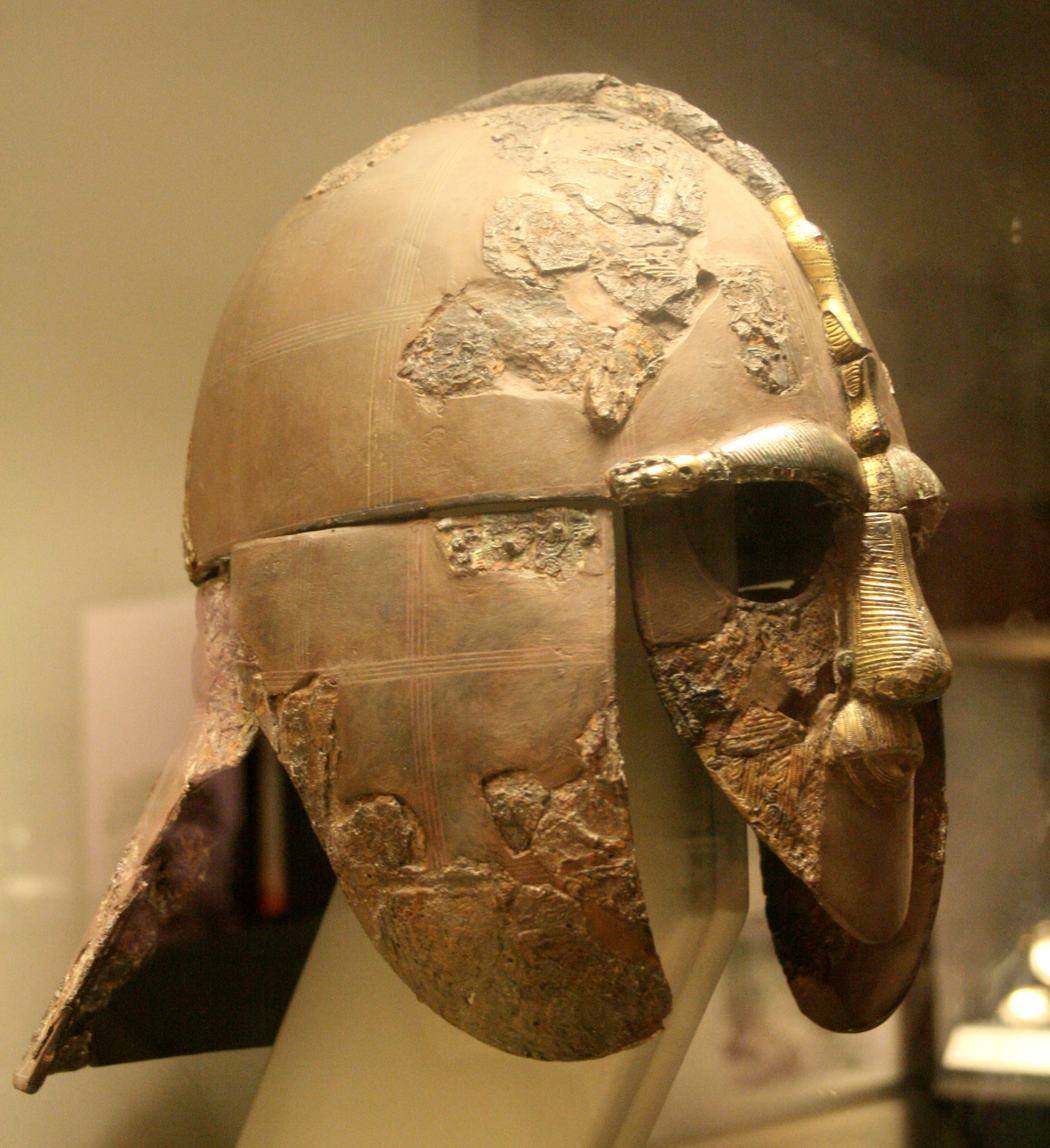
The Sutton Hoo helmet discovered by Brown's excavations

Landowner Edith May Pretty (1883–1942) was curious about the contents of about eighteen ancient mounds on her Sutton Hoo estate in southeast Suffolk. At a 1937 fete in nearby Woodbridge, Pretty discussed the possibility of opening them with Vincent B. Redstone, member of several historical and archaeological societies. Redstone invited the curator of the Ipswich Corporation Museum, Guy Maynard, to a meeting with Pretty in July 1937, and Maynard offered the services of Brown as excavator.

Sutton Hoo farm derives its name in part from the surrounding parish of Sutton and its village, where 77 households lived by 1086. Sutton is a compound noun formed from the Old English sut (south) and tun (enclosed settlement or farm). The farm and its mounds have been recorded on maps since at least 1601, when John Norden included it in his survey of Sir Michael Stanhope's estates between Woodbridge and Aldeburgh. The land was known variously as "Hows", "Hough", "Howe", and eventually "Hoo Farm" by the 19th century (c.1834–65). "Hoo" probably means a "hill" – an elevated place shaped like a heel, from the Old English hóh or hó (similar to the German Höhe), which is sometimes associated with a burial site.

=== June–August 1938 ===
Maynard released Brown from his employment by Ipswich Museum for June – August 1938, during which he was paid 30 shillings a week by Pretty. Arriving on 20 June, Brown was lodged for the duration with Pretty's chauffeur at Tranmer House, then called Sutton Hoo House. He brought along books spanning the Bronze Age to the Anglo-Saxon period and some excavation reports. Given the proposed time limit of two weeks, Brown decided to copy the cross-trench digging methods used in 1934 excavations of Iron Age mounds at Warborough Hill in Norfolk, where similar time constraints had applied.

With the help of Pretty's labourers, Brown excavated three mounds, discovering that they were burial sites showing signs of robbery during the medieval period.

Sutton Hoo map, highlighting in red the mounds opened by Brown between 1938 and 1939.

Brown first tackled what was later identified as Mound 3. Initially he found nothing, but evidence suggested a bowl-shaped area had been dug below. Following Maynard's recommendation Brown removed the soil and found a "grave deposit", offset from the mound's centre. Its location resulted perhaps from the shape of the mound distorting over time, or from the removal of some of its material. Early Saxon pottery was found, lying on a narrow 6-foot-long wooden tray-like object – "a mere film of rotted wood fibres", plus an iron axe that Maynard later considered to be Viking ("Scandinavian"). Pretty decided to open other mounds, and two were chosen.

In what was later known as Mound 2, Brown used the east – west compass-bearing of the excavated board found in Mound 3 to align a 6-foot-wide trench. From outside the mound's perimeter he began digging along the old ground surface towards the mound on 7 July 1938. A ship's rivet was discovered, along with Bronze Age pottery shards and a bead. On 11 July Brown found more ship's rivets, and asked Ipswich Museum to forward material on the Snape ship burial which was excavated in 1862–63. Pretty wrote to make an appointment for Brown with the curator of Aldeburgh Museum, where artefacts from the Snape excavation were housed. Maynard forwarded a drawing which arrived on 15 July and showed the pattern of the Snape boat's rivets. On 20 July Brown was driven to Aldeburgh by Pretty's chauffeur, where he found the Sutton Hoo rivet to be very similar to those from Snape. Back at Sutton Hoo, the shape of a boat with only one pointed end was uncovered. It seemed to have been cut in half, with one half possibly used as a cover over the other half. Evidence suggested that the site had been looted, as the upper half was missing. Signs of a cremation were found, along with a gold-plated shield boss and glass fragments.

Brown excavated what was later called Mound 4, which he found to have been completely emptied of archaeological evidence by robbers.

In August 1938 Brown went back to work for the Ipswich Museum, returning to the dig at Stanton Chare. Meanwhile, Maynard wrote to the Manx Museum to find out more about ship burials.

=== May–August 1939 ===
At Maynard's request, due to his curiosity about the axe, Brown returned to the employment of Pretty for a second season. On 8 May 1939 he started to excavate Mound 1, the largest mound, assisted on Pretty's instructions by gardener John Jacobs and gamekeeper William Spooner.

As before, Brown used the compass bearing uncovered in the end mound to start a narrow pilot trench outside the mound. On 11 May he discovered iron rivets that were similar to but bigger than those found in the 2nd mound, suggesting a sailing vessel even larger than the boat found earlier. Brown cycled to Ipswich to report the find to Maynard, who advised him to proceed with care in uncovering the impression of the ship and its rivets. Brown uncovered not only the impression left in the sandy soil by a 27-metre-long ship from the 7th century AD, but evidence of robbers who had stopped before they had reached the level of a burial deposit. Based on knowledge of ship burials in Norway, Brown and Maynard surmised that a roof had covered the burial chamber. Realizing the potential grandeur of the find, Maynard recommended to Pretty that they involve the British Museum's Department of British Antiquities. Pretty demurred at the possible indefinite suspension of excavation that might result, but neither Brown nor Maynard were willing to continue. Maynard thought that the boat was a cenotaph, as no evidence of a body was found, a position that he still retained by 1963.

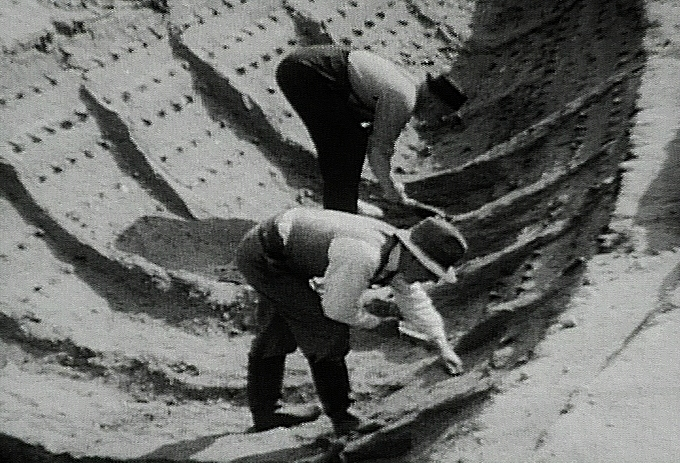
Basil Brown (front) and Lt. Cmdr. J. K. D. Hutchison excavating the 7th century burial ship at Sutton Hoo in 1939.

Charles Phillips, Fellow of Selwyn College, Cambridge, heard rumours about the dig during a visit to his university's Museum of Archaeology and Anthropology on Downing Street, Cambridge, and of the inquiries made of the Manx Museum about Viking ship burials. He arranged to meet Maynard, and they drove to Sutton Hoo from Ipswich on 6 June to visit the site. Phillips suggested that the British Museum and the Ancient Monuments Department of the Ministry of Works should be telephoned and informed.

A meeting convened at Sutton Hoo by representatives of the British Museum, the Office of Works, Cambridge University, Ipswich Museum, and the Suffolk Institute three days later gave Phillips control over excavations, starting in July. Brown was allowed to continue, and uncovered the burial chamber on 14 June, followed later by the ship's stern. In 1940 Thomas Kendrick (Keeper, Department of British and Medieval Antiquities in the British Museum) suggested that the burial site was that of Rædwald of East Anglia.

Having ensconced himself in the Bull Hotel at Woodbridge on 8 July, Phillips took charge of the excavations on 11 July. Employed by the Office of Works, he convened a team that included W. F. Grimes, O. G. S. Crawford, and Stuart and Peggy Piggott. On 21 July Peggy Piggott discovered the first signs of what later turned out to be 263 items. Phillips and Maynard had differences of opinion, leading Phillips to exclude the Ipswich Museum. The press had come to learn of the significance of the find by 28 July.

Brown continued to work on the site in accordance with his contract with Pretty, although excluded from excavating the burial chamber that he had located.

On 14 August Brown testified at a treasure trove inquest which decided that the finds, transported to London for safekeeping due to the threat of war and concealed underground at Aldwych tube station, belonged to Pretty. Working with a farm labourer Brown took care to cover the excavated ship site with hessian and bracken.

Brown returned again to his work at Stanton Chare in late 1939.

== After Sutton Hoo ==
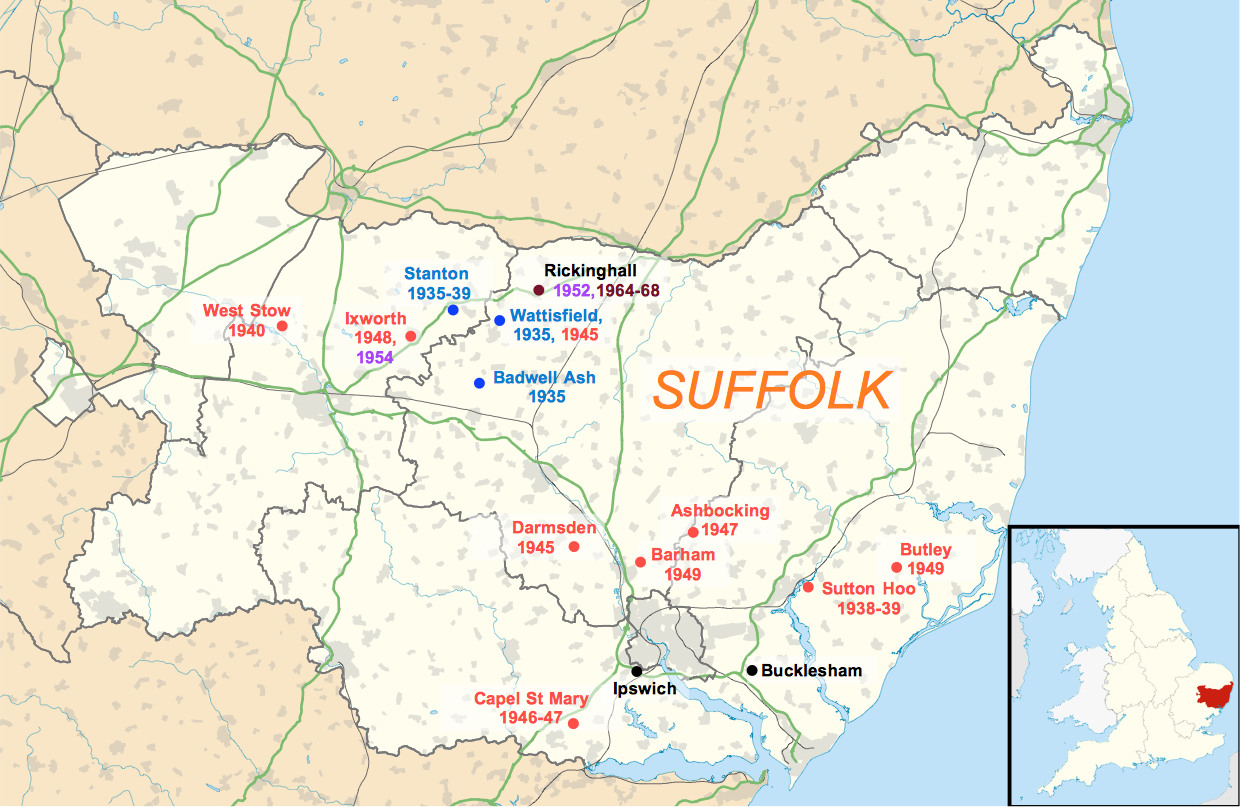
Suffolk sites where Brown conducted excavations between 1935 and 1968.

During World War II Brown performed a few archaeological tasks for the Ipswich Museum, but was principally engaged in civil defence work in Suffolk. He served in the Navy, Army and Air Force Institutes and in the Royal Observer Corps post at Micklewood Green and tended the heating boilers of Culford School, Bury St. Edmunds. It became his usual practice to stay at the school for a fortnight at a time before undertaking the arduous twenty-mile bicycle journey home to Rickinghall.

After the war Brown was again employed by the Ipswich Museum, nominally as an "attendant", but with archaeological, external duties. He joined the Ipswich and District Natural History Society and then the District Astronomical Society (1950–1957) when it broke away from its parent body. In 1952 he undertook excavations in Rickinghall that uncovered a long-since disappeared Lady Chapel at the Superior Church and a Norman font at the Inferior Church. Until the 1960s he steadily continued the systematic study of archaeological remains in Suffolk, cycling everywhere, and preparing an extremely copious (if sometimes indecipherable) record of information pertaining to it. In 1961 Brown retired from Ipswich Museum, but continued to conduct excavations at Broom Hills in Rickinghall between 1964 and 1968. He uncovered evidence of a Neolithic presence, Roman occupation and the site of a Saxon nobleman's house.

== Death ==
In 1965, during the Broom Hills excavations, Brown suffered either a stroke or a heart attack, which ended his active involvement in archaeological digs. He died on 12 March 1977 of pneumonia at his home in Rickinghall and was cremated at Ipswich crematorium on 17 March.

His wife Dorothy died six years later, in 1983.

== Legacy and assessment ==
The regard in which Brown was held is evident from the efforts made by members of the Suffolk Institute to provide him with a pension. The Sutton Hoo scholar Rupert Bruce-Mitford ensured that Brown was awarded a Civil list pension of £250 in 1966. While he never published material on his archaeological work as a sole author, his meticulously kept notebooks, including photographs, plans and drawings, are now kept by the Suffolk County Council Archaeological Service and Ipswich Records Office. Out of this was developed the County Sites and Monuments Record of Suffolk, the basis of the record as it exists today. He encouraged groups of children to work on his sites, and introduced a whole generation of youngsters to the processes of archaeology and the fascination of what lay under the ploughed fields of the county.

Brown's contributions to archaeology were recognised in 2009 by a plaque in Rickinghall Inferior Church; the plaque attests to his esteem among Suffolk archaeologists, historians, and locals. The items found at Sutton Hoo as a result of his initial excavations continue to be studied through current scientific methods from time to time at the British Museum – most recently, yielding additional insights into the origin of bitumen found among the grave goods. The annual Basil Brown Memorial Lecture in his name was established by the Sutton Hoo Society, which supports research at the site of Brown's greatest discovery. A street in Rickinghall, the village where Brown lived, was named Basil Brown Close. In May 2023 his home was marked with a commemorative blue plaque.

Brown was a central character in the 2021 film The Dig, which retold the events of the Sutton Hoo discoveries. He was played by Ralph Fiennes, who was born in nearby Ipswich.

== Bibliography ==
- Brown, B. (1924). "Star Atlases and Charts". The English Mechanic and World of Science 119, Issue 3071: 4–5, 1 February.
- Brown, B. (1924). "The Star Catalogues". The English Mechanic and World of Science 120, issue 3105: 140, 26 September.
- Brown, B. (1932, 1968). Astronomical Atlases, Maps and Charts. Search Publishing Company, London, 1932. Reprinted by Dawson's of Pall Mall, 1968. ISBN 978-07-12901314.
- Brown, B. (1932). "Stephen Groombridge FRS (1755–1832)". Journal of the British Astronomical Association 42, no. 6: 212. Read by Frederick Addey to the BAA meeting of 30 March.
- Maynard, G., Brown, B., Spencer, H. E. P., Grimes, W. F., and Moore, I. E. (1935). "Reports on a Roman pottery making site at Foxledge Common, Wattisfield, Suffolk". Proceedings of the Suffolk Institute of Archaeology 22, Part 2: 178–197. Retrieved 24 June 2017.
- Maynard, Guy; Brown, Basil (1936). "The Roman settlement at Stanton Chair (Chare) near Ixworth, Suffolk (PDF)". Proceedings of the Suffolk Institute of Archaeology 22, Part 3: 339–341. Retrieved 24 June 2017.
- Brown, B. J. W., G. M. Knocker, N. Smedley, and S. E. West (1954). "Excavations at Grimstone End, Pakenham". Proceedings of the Suffolk Institute of Archaeology 26, Part 3: 189–207. Retrieved 24 June 2017.

In addition, Brown was mentioned 44 times in observation reports published in the Journal of the British Astronomical Association.

== See also ==
- The Dig (novel)
- The Dig (film) from 2021

== Novels ==
- Preston, John (2016). The Dig. New York: Other Press. ISBN 9781590517802. A novel dramatising the Sutton Hoo excavations.
