= Tranmer House =

Country house in Suffolk, United Kingdom

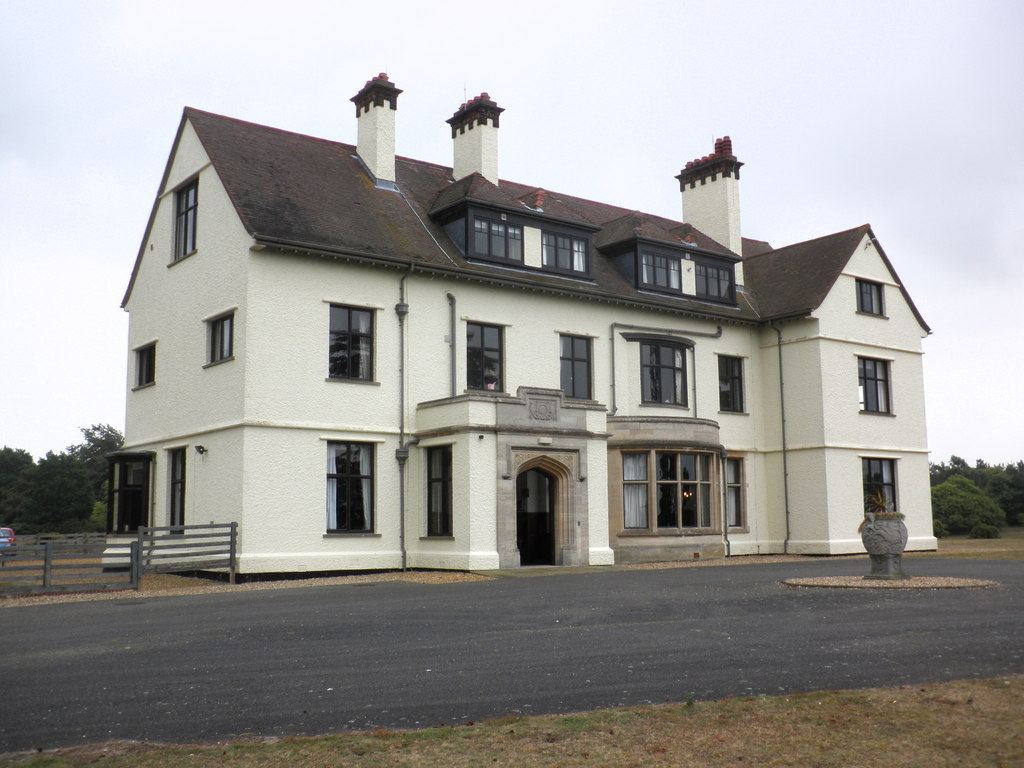

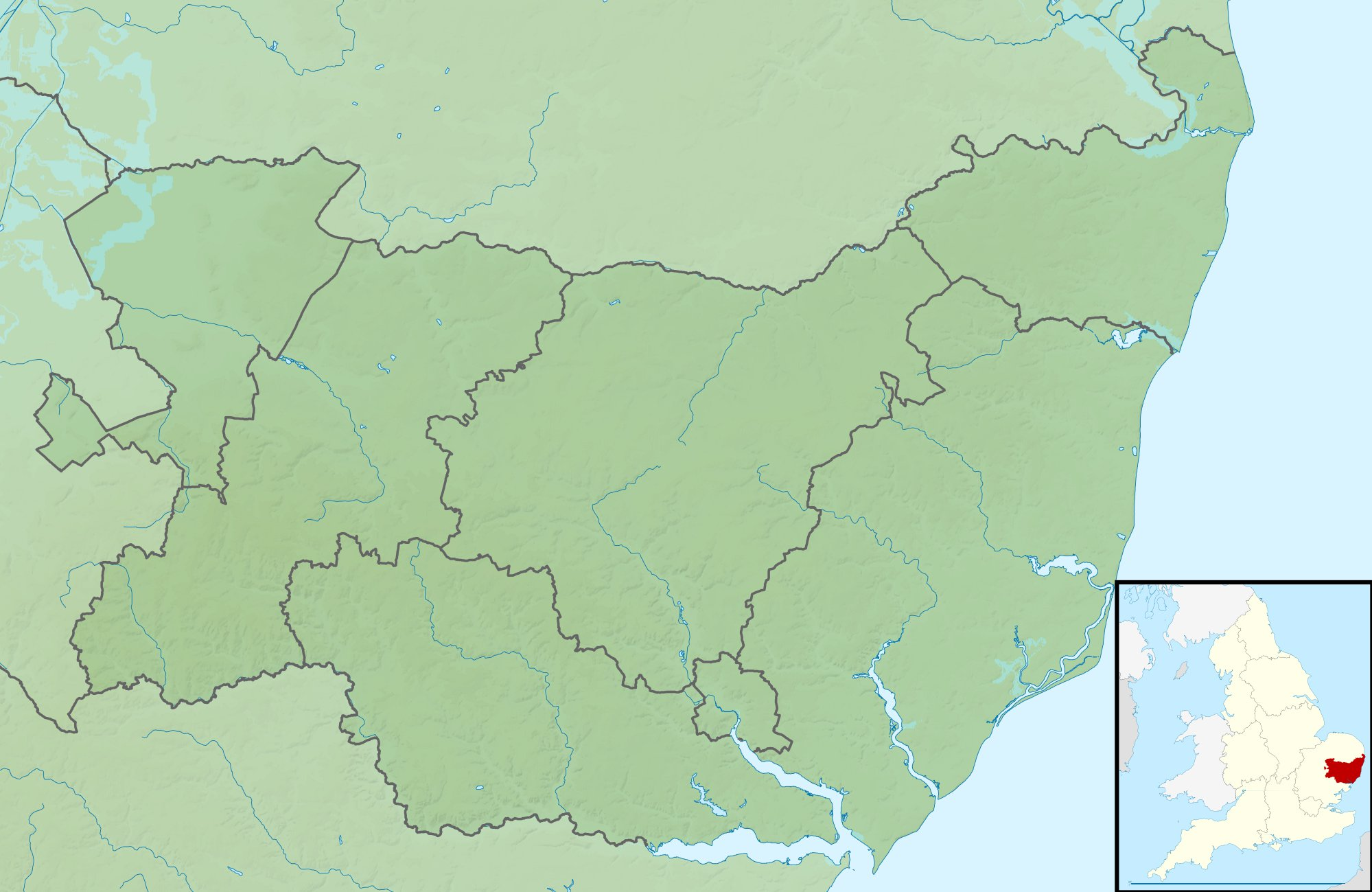
- Location within Suffolk
- 52.0908°N 1.3381°E
- Type: House
- Location: Sutton Hoo, Woodbridge, Suffolk

History
- Built: 1910

Site notes
- Architect: John Shewell Corder
- Architectural style: Tudor Revival
- Owner: National Trust

Tranmer House is a country house in Sutton Hoo, Woodbridge, Suffolk, England, dating from 1910. The house is located on the Sutton Hoo Anglo-Saxon burial site, and, in 1938, was the home of Edith Pretty. In June 1938, Pretty employed Basil Brown to undertake the excavation of a range of burial mounds on the estate, leading to Brown's discovery in May 1939 of a ship burial, "one of the most important archaeological discoveries of all time". The house is now owned by the National Trust.

== History and description ==
Tranmer House, then called Sutton Hoo House, was designed in 1910 by John Shewell Corder, an architect based in Ipswich, for a Suffolk artist, John Chadwick Lomax. In 1926, the Sutton Hoo estate was bought by Edith Pretty and her husband, Frank, for £15,250. Edith Pretty, born Edith Dempster in 1883, inherited a considerable fortune from her father upon his death in 1925. Following Frank Pretty's death in 1934, Edith Pretty developed an interest in excavating the burial mounds that lay to the north-east of Tranmer House and engaged a local archaeologist, Basil Brown, to undertake two digs, in 1938 and 1939. During the second dig, Brown located the Anglo-Saxon ship burial site under Mound 1, "the largest Anglo-Saxon ship burial ever discovered". The trove of treasure within made Sutton Hoo "the richest intact early medieval grave in Europe with a burial chamber full of dazzling riches".

Edith Pretty died in 1942, having gifted the Sutton Hoo treasure to the British Museum. (Note: The then Prime Minister, Winston Churchill, offered Pretty a CBE in recognition of her generosity, but she declined.) The house was sold by her son's trustees in the late 1940s, and was owned by a number of local farming families until bought by the Tranmers. Following the death of Annie Tranmer, the house and the Sutton Hoo burial site were bequeathed to the National Trust in 1998. The Trust renamed the house in acknowledgement of the donation.

James Bettley and Nikolaus Pevsner, in their Suffolk: East volume of The Buildings of England series, describe the architectural style of Tranmer as "Tudor". The house now operates as a museum, while the stable block, and original squash court, form part of the Sutton Hoo Visitor Centre. (Note: Tranmer House, and the wider Sutton Hoo site, are referenced in the 2021 film The Dig. The film, a dramatisation of the 1938/1939 excavations, used locations in Surrey for much of the filming, including for the burial site itself, and for Tranmer House, the exterior shots of which are of Norney Grange, a house in Shackleford designed by Charles Voysey.)

In 2000, a second Anglo-Saxon cemetery was discovered beneath the rose garden.

== Sources ==
- Bruce-Mitford, Rupert (1977). "Obituary: Basil Brown" (PDF). Proceedings of the Suffolk Institute of Archaeology. 34 (1). Ipswich: 71.
- Bettley, James; Pevsner, Nikolaus (2015). Suffolk: East. Buildings of England. New Haven, US and London: Yale University Press. ISBN 978-0-300-19654-2. OCLC 995084088.
