= The Dig (2021 film) =

British drama film directed by Simon Stone

- Promotional poster
- Directed by: Simon Stone
- Screenplay by: Moira Buffini
- Based on: The Dig by John Preston
- Produced by: Gabrielle Tana; Ellie Wood; Carolyn Marks Blackwood; Murray Ferguson
- Starring: Carey Mulligan; Ralph Fiennes; Lily James; Johnny Flynn; Ben Chaplin; Ken Stott; Archie Barnes; Monica Dolan
- Cinematography: Mike Eley
- Edited by: Jon Harris
- Music by: Stefan Gregory
- Production companies: Magnolia Mae Films; Clerkenwell Films
- Distributed by: Netflix
- Release dates: 14 January 2021 (New Zealand); 15 January 2021 (United States); 29 January 2021 (United Kingdom)
- Running time: 112 minutes
- Country: United Kingdom
- Language: English

The Dig is a 2021 British drama film directed by Simon Stone, based on the 2007 historical novel of the same name by John Preston, which reimagines the events of the 1939 excavation of Sutton Hoo in Suffolk, England. It stars Carey Mulligan, Ralph Fiennes, Lily James, Johnny Flynn, Ben Chaplin, Ken Stott, Archie Barnes, and Monica Dolan.

It had a limited release on 14 January 2021, followed by streaming on Netflix on 29 January 2021. The film received positive reviews from critics and received five nominations for the British Academy Film Awards, including Outstanding British Film.

== Plot ==
In 1939, Suffolk landowner Edith Pretty hires local self-taught archaeologist Basil Brown to tackle the large burial mounds at her rural estate in Sutton Hoo near Woodbridge. At first, she offers the same money he received from the Ipswich Museum, the agricultural wage, but he says it is inadequate; so she increases her offer by 12% to £2 a week which he accepts.

His former employers fail to persuade Brown to work on a Roman villa they deem more important. They ignore Brown, who left school aged 12, when he suggests the mounds could be Anglo-Saxon rather than the more common Viking era.

Working with assistants from Pretty's estate, Brown slowly excavates the more promising of the mounds. One day the trench collapses on him, but they dig him out in time. He spends more time with Edith, a widow, and her young son Robert, finding common interest in archaeology and astronomy with them. Brown's wife, May, supports his jobs as excavator despite the poor pay. Edith struggles with her health, warned by her doctor to avoid stress.

Brown is astonished to uncover iron rivets from a ship, suggesting that it is the burial site of someone of tremendous distinction, such as a king. Prominent local archaeologist James Reid Moir attempts to join the dig but is rebuffed; Edith instead hires her cousin Rory Lomax to join the project. News of the discovery soon spreads, and Cambridge archaeologist Charles Phillips arrives, declares the site to be of national importance, and takes over the dig by order of the Office of Works.

As the Second World War approaches, Phillips brings in a large team, including Stuart Piggott, and his wife Peggy Piggott who uncovers proof that it is Anglo-Saxon in origin. Brown is demoted to only keep the site in order but Edith intervenes and he resumes digging. Brown discovers a Merovingian Tremissis, a small gold coin of Late Antiquity and Phillips declares the site to be of major historical significance. Phillips wants to send all the artefacts to the British Museum but Edith, concerned about air raids in London, asserts her rights. An inquest finding confirms that she is the owner of the ship and its priceless treasure trove of grave goods but she despairs as her health continues to decline.

Peggy, neglected by her husband Stuart, is attracted to Rory, but he is soon called up by the Royal Air Force; Peggy ends her marriage and sleeps with Rory before he leaves. Edith decides to donate the Sutton Hoo treasure to the British Museum, requesting that Brown be given recognition for his work. The film ends with Brown and his co-workers replacing earth over the ship to preserve it.

As the end credits begin, text explains the fate of Edith and the recovered objects. The treasure was hidden in the London Underground during the war and first exhibited—without any mention of Basil Brown—nine years after Edith's death. Only much later was Brown given full credit for his contribution and his name is now displayed permanently alongside Pretty's at the British Museum.

== Cast ==
- Carey Mulligan as Edith Pretty
- Ralph Fiennes as Basil Brown
- Lily James as Peggy Piggott
- Johnny Flynn as Rory Lomax
- Ben Chaplin as Stuart Piggott
- Ken Stott as Charles Phillips
- Archie Barnes as Robert Pretty
- Monica Dolan as May Brown
- Eamon Farren as John Brailsford
- Danny Webb as John Grateley

== Production ==
The project began in 2006 when producer Ellie Wood read the manuscript of The Dig by John Preston, ahead of its 2007 publication, and optioned the novel in order to adapt it for the screen. It was announced in September 2018 that Nicole Kidman and Ralph Fiennes were in negotiations to star in the film. However, by August 2019, Kidman was no longer involved with the project due to her schedule clashing with another film, with Carey Mulligan cast to replace her. The rights for the film also moved from BBC Films to Netflix. Lily James entered negotiations to join the cast in September. In October 2019, Johnny Flynn, Ben Chaplin, Ken Stott and Monica Dolan joined the cast of the film.

Principal photography began at Shackleford in Surrey in October 2019 – Norney Grange there being used to stand in as Pretty's house at Sutton Hoo – with location filming taking place in Suffolk near to the original discovery site. The film's production team conducted research at the British Museum in its Sutton Hoo archive and gallery. Underwater filming took place at Pinewood Studios.

== Release ==
The film had a limited release on 15 January 2021. Netflix released the film for streaming on 29 January 2021. The film was the third-most watched title in its debut weekend, then finished seventh each of the following two weekends.

== Reception ==
=== Critical response ===
Rotten Tomatoes reports that 88% of 153 critics gave the film a positive review, with an average rating of 7.20/10. The site's critics consensus reads, "Featuring beautifully matched performances from Ralph Fiennes and Carey Mulligan set against gorgeously filmed English countryside, The Dig yields period drama treasures." According to Metacritic, which sampled 35 critics and calculated a weighted average score of 73 out of 100, the film received "generally favorable" reviews.

Kevin Maher of The Times gave the film five out of five stars and described it as a "serious, intellectually committed, and emotionally piercing cinema. Unmissable." Katie Rife of The A.V. Club gave the film a B− and wrote, "for all the film's sweeping, romantic ideas, the actual experience of watching The Dig is a lot like sitting at a bus stop."

Will Gompertz of BBC News awarded the film four out of five stars, writing that "it is a thoroughly enjoyable film made with subtlety and sensitivity: a real tonic for these bleak winter days and nights. It lacks the emotional and intellectual heft and bite to make it an unmissable, classic movie, but I would happily watch it again, and again." In a more mixed review, Mark Kermode of The Guardian rated the film three out of five stars, writing that "it's a melancholy whimsy about common purpose, new friendship and the persistence of the past, bogged down occasionally by a somewhat superfluous romantic subplot but buoyed up by Mike Eley's lush cinematography".

=== Accolades ===
On 4 February 2021, the film was listed for nine BAFTAs, including Best Film, Outstanding British Film, Director, Leading Actor, Cinematography and Adapted Screenplay. The nominations were announced on 9 March 2021. At the awards ceremony on 10 and 11 April, the film did not win an award in any of the nominated categories.

Year	Award	Category	Recipients	Result	Ref.
2021	British Academy Film Awards	Outstanding British Film	Simon Stone, Gabrielle Tana, Ellie Wood, Moira Buffini	Nominated	
2021	British Academy Film Awards	Best Adapted Screenplay	Moira Buffini	Nominated	
2021	British Academy Film Awards	Best Production Design	Maria Djurkovic and Tatiana MacDonald	Nominated	
2021	British Academy Film Awards	Best Costume Design	Alice Babidge	Nominated	
2021	British Academy Film Awards	Best Makeup and Hair	Jenny Shircore	Nominated	
2021	AARP Movies for Grownups Awards	Best Actor	Ralph Fiennes	Nominated	
2021	London Critics Circle Film Awards	British/Irish Actress of the Year	Carey Mulligan	Nominated	
2021	Casting Society of America, USA	Outstanding Achievement in Casting - Studio or Independent Feature - Drama	Lucy Bevan	Nominated	

== Historical accuracy ==
Mark Bridge of The Times noted that archaeologists had taken issue with the film's portrayal of Peggy Piggott as inexperienced and only hired because her light weight would not disturb the delicate site. By 1939, Piggott was an experienced archaeologist in her own right, and had studied archaeology at the University of Cambridge and University of London. She is also presented as being married to an older, more experienced male archaeologist, whereas in reality Stuart Piggott was only two years her senior (27 and 29, respectively) and they had met while both students. The portrayal of their marriage in the film has been described as “staggeringly slanderous”; in fact they did not divorce until 1956.

The ages of other characters were also changed from their real counterparts. Charles Phillips, who was in his late 30s at the time of the dig, is played by Ken Stott, who was in his 60s, and plays the role as an elderly curmudgeon. Landowner Edith Pretty, who was in her mid 50s, was initially intended to be portrayed by 53-year-old Nicole Kidman; the role was ultimately filled by Carey Mulligan, who was then in her mid 30s.

Bridge also criticised the addition of the fictional Rory Lomax as a love interest for Piggott. The character of Lomax, Pretty's cousin, is depicted as the photographer. Mercie Lack and Barbara Wagstaff (two teachers), and O. G. S. Crawford (the archaeological officer of the Ordnance Survey) separately took series of photographs. The two women who extensively photographed the site were excluded from the book and film to create a romantic subplot.

== See also ==
- The Lost King, a 2022 comedy-drama film based on the search for the remains of Richard III
