= Nadir Dinshaw =

British Parsi philanthropist, businessman, and accountant (1925–2002)

- Born: 17 December 1925
- Died: 17 December 2002 (aged 77)

Nadir Hoshang Dinshaw (17 December 1925 – 12 December 2002) was a British Parsi philanthropist, businessman, and accountant notable for his unwitting role in the Thorpe affair.

He served on the Joint Council for the Welfare of Immigrants, the board of Christian Aid. He also founded the Nadir Dinshaw Chair in the School of Philosophy, Theology, and Religion at the University of Birmingham.

== Life ==
Born in December 1925, to a distinguished Parsi family in Karachi, the son of Hoshang NE Dinshaw, grandson of Nadirshaw Edulji Dinshaw and great-grandson of Seth Edulji Dinshaw.

Dinshaw was educated at Harrow School, where he attended for a year and at the University of Bombay. Dinshaw converted from Zoroastrianism to Christianity in the early 1960s.

Dinshaw died in 2002. He was married to Hilla Dubash. He was survived by his daughter Nali and his granddaughter Kitty. Rowan Williams preached at his memorial service.

== Role as the 'innocent dupe' in the Thorpe Affair ==
Dinshaw, was a keen supporter of the Liberal cause for many years. He has been asked by party leader, Jeremy Thorpe to act as a conduit for a £20,000 donation to avoid ‘unfortunate publicity’.

This money had allegedly been diverted to pay for the contract killing on American soil of Thorpe's former male lover Norman Josiffe.

Before the trial, Thorpe threatened Dinshaw with deportation if he was not “economical with the truth”. Dinshaw was described by The Guardian as having ‘told the whole truth, but with such obvious concern for the friend in the dock who had so cynically tried to use him, that defense counsel George Carman congratulated him afterward’. This has been described as a rare case of a prosecution witness being commended by the defense counsel.

In Peter Cook's 'Entirely a Matter for You' sketch, Dinshaw was parodied as 'Nadir Rickshaw', who was parodied as "the very type to boil up foul-smelling biryanis at all hours of the night and keep you awake with his pagan limbo dancing."
