= The Dig (novel) =

2007 historical novel by John Preston

- First edition
- Author: John Preston
- Illustrator: Clifford Harper
- Language: English
- Genre: Historical/Romance novel
- Publisher: Viking Press
- Publication date: May 2007
- Publication place: United Kingdom
- Media type: Print (Hardback & Paperback)
- Pages: vi & 231 pp
- ISBN: 978-0-670-91491-3
- OCLC: 77540876

The Dig is a historical novel by John Preston, published in May 2007, set in the context of the 1939 Anglo-Saxon ship burial excavation at Sutton Hoo, Suffolk, England. The dust jacket describes it as "a brilliantly realized account of the most famous archaeological dig in Britain in modern times".

The author employs a degree of literary license so that the account in the book differs in various ways from the real events of the Sutton Hoo excavations.

== Background ==
John Preston was for many years chief television critic for The Sunday Telegraph newspaper. He is also the nephew of one of the excavators of Sutton Hoo, Mrs. Peggy Piggott (wife of Stuart Piggott, afterward Edinburgh Professor of Archaeology), born Cecily Margaret Preston (1912–1994), but later known to the archaeological world as Margaret Guido. However, by his own account Preston only became aware of the story surrounding the excavation around 2004, and therefore the content is not derived directly from Mrs. Piggott's testimony.

The novel is the first account of these events in which the role of Mrs. Piggott is particularly emphasised. Although she did not lead Basil Brown's excavation, she was the first of the excavators to discover gold items in the burial chamber within the ship, and therefore was at the forefront of it. The effect of the wonderful discovery on her, in particular, forms an important thread in this version of the story. She becomes the narrator of the chamber excavation part of the story (pp. 119–202).

An earlier account of the controversy and personalities surrounding the discovery, drawing on unpublished letters and Ipswich Museum MS documentation, was published by Robert Markham in 2002.

== Literary licence ==
As a form of historical novel, this work draws on recorded information about real archaeology, real people and real events. However, some facts have been altered to suit the author's literary purpose, as he freely admits. In an author's note, he states that "Certain changes have been made for dramatic effect". Soon after he adds, "Any mistakes, of course, are entirely my own" (p. 233). The story is told through several voices, so that at each stage it is that individual's knowledge of events that is being represented. This allows the author to present data selectively.

These changes affect the chronology and topography of the excavation, the archaeological methods, the state of knowledge of the excavators at the time, the identity and contents of the various burial mounds, and (to some extent) the character and motivations of the real people involved. Some caution is therefore needed in accepting the historical canvas.

The major alterations in the historical framework occur in the first half of the book. The real excavations took place over two seasons, 1938 and 1939. In 1938 (20 June – 9 August) three mounds (and an indeterminate feature) were opened, and in 1939 (8 May – 3 September) the mound containing the famous undisturbed ship-burial was explored. In the novel the two seasons are merged into one, made to commence in April 1939 and end at the outbreak of War (3 September 1939). Of the three 1938 mounds the excavation of the first is described in the novel (pp. 15–18, 23–24, 29–32). The second in the novel is probably meant for the third of 1938, a disturbed cremation burial: A dramatic episode of a landslide in the novel (pp. 34–36) is possibly transposed from other phases of the excavation not described.

The second mound explored in 1938 (known as Mound 2), contained a disturbed burial which had included a ship, is not described, but is merged into the account of the excavation of the famous ship-mound ("Mound 1"), which took place in 1939. Hence the true story of the excavation of Mound 2 is suppressed, and the preparations for the 1939 excavation are omitted. Some glassware found in Mound 2 is, in the novel, transposed to Mound 1 (e.g. p. 61). Thus the novel cannot portray what was learned from the experience and findings of the 1938 dig, and how that informed the 1939 discovery.

The most obvious example is that the Suffolk excavators found and researched the iron ship-rivets from Mound 2 in 1938 and were therefore ready to recognise them as soon as they appeared in the following year. They had also realised that the objects being found were of an early Anglo-Saxon date during 1938. In the novel the realisation that there is a ship in the ground comes as a complete surprise (pp. 65–68), and the credit for recognising the early Anglo-Saxon date of the find is given to the "professional" archaeologists who take over from them (pp. 141–143). Basil Brown had recognised this in 1938. "I can now return to my original theory of last year" he wrote on Tuesday 18 July 1939.

Charles Phillips's explanation of the whetstone as a "sceptre" (pp. 163–5) (while it is being excavated) is anachronistic because, although that idea did occur early, it was not closely argued until many years later. Also, some descriptions of the removal of artefacts in the chamber do not tally with the evidence of photographs taken during the excavations: the whetstone was half upright, and was left semi-exposed for some time, not as described on pages 163–5: and the purse lid was carefully cleaned down among the other gold items in the surrounding assemblage, and their relationships elucidated by the Piggotts, not "prised out" as described on pages 150–51. Another anomaly in the novel is that Peggy and Stuart Piggott are said to interrupt their honeymoon for the dig (pp. 121–125; 201): they had been married since November 1936.

== Poetic allusion ==
In the novel, Peggy tells how the English cellist Beatrice Harrison was recorded and broadcast during the 1920s and 1930s playing in her garden to the accompaniment of nightingales singing (pp. 171–2). Her account appears to be in homage to the poem "The Nightingale Broadcasts" by Robert Saxton, which won the Keats-Shelley Prize for Poetry in 2001. Later, where Saxton has "a nightingale cadenza, which gargled and trilled from the oak leaves", Peggy's voice tells of their "long gurgling trills" (p. 196). This theme appears to draw on Harrison's autobiography, first published in 1985. Harrison appeared in the 1943 British film The Demi-Paradise, as herself, playing while nightingales sing during a BBC radio broadcast.

== Adaptations ==
A radio serial drama based on Preston's novel was broadcast on BBC Radio 4 commencing 15 September 2008.

A film adaptation was in production in 2019, directed by Simon Stone, with a screenplay by Moira Buffini, and starring Carey Mulligan as Edith Pretty, Ralph Fiennes as Basil Brown, and Lily James as Peggy Piggott, to be distributed by Netflix. It was released in a limited release on 15 January 2021, followed by streaming on Netflix on 29 January 2021.

== Sources ==
- J. Preston, The Dig (Penguin Books/Viking, London 2007). ISBN 978-0-670-91491-3
- B. Brown, Diaries of the Sutton Hoo Excavations, Transcripts in Public Archives (Suffolk County Council and Ipswich Museum), Volume LXIV.
- R. L. S. Bruce-Mitford, Aspects of Anglo-Saxon Archaeology (Gollancz, London 1974). ISBN 0-575-01704-X
- R. L. S. Bruce-Mitford, The Sutton Hoo Ship-Burial (3 Vols in 4), (British Museum, London 1975, 1978, 1983)
- B. Harrison and P. Cleveland Peck, The cello and the nightingale: the autobiography of Beatrice Harrison (John Murray, London 1985). ISBN 0-7195-4208-1
- A. C. Evans, The Sutton Hoo Ship Burial (British Museum, London 1986/9). ISBN 0-7141-0544-9
- C. Green, Sutton Hoo: The Excavation of a Royal Ship-Burial (London 1963).
- N. F. Hele, Notes or Jottings about Aldeburgh (London 1870).
- T. D. Kendrick, Anglo-Saxon Art to AD 900 (Methuen & co, London 1938).
- R. A. D. Markham, Sutton Hoo through the Rear-View Mirror (Sutton Hoo Society, Woodbridge 2002). ISBN 0-9543453-0-4
- C. W. Phillips, The Excavation of the Sutton Hoo Ship-Burial, The Antiquaries' Journal 20, no 2 (April 1940), 149-202.
- C. W. Phillips et al., The Sutton Hoo Ship-Burial, Antiquity (March 1940).
- C. W. Phillips, My Life in Archaeology (Sutton, Gloucester 1987). ISBN 0-86299-362-8
- S. J. Plunkett, "The Suffolk Institute of Archaeology: its Life, Times and Members", Proceedings of the Suffolk Institute of Archaeology, vol. 39, part 2, 165–207. ISSN 0262-6004
- S.J. Plunkett, 'Basil John Wait Brown' (Oxford DNB).
