= Stonehouse (TV series) =

British television series

- Screenplay by: John Preston
- Directed by: Jon S. Baird
- Starring: Matthew Macfadyen; Emer Heatley; Kevin McNally; Dorothy Atkinson; Keeley Hawes
- Theme music composer: Rolfe Kent
- Country of origin: United Kingdom
- Original language: English
- No. of series: 1
- No. of episodes: 3

Production
- Executive producers: Jon S Baird; Neil Blair; Ruth Kenley-Letts; Matthew Macfadyen; John Preston; Ellie Wood
- Producers: Ruth Kenley-Letts; Ellie Wood
- Cinematography: Mark Wolf
- Editor: Steven Worsley
- Running time: 55 minutes
- Production companies: Snowed-In Productions; Clearwood Films

Original release
- Network: ITV
- Release: 2 January – 4 January 2023

Stonehouse is a British comedy-drama television series dramatising the life and times of disgraced British government minister John Stonehouse, first broadcast from 2 to 4 January 2023. The series starred Matthew Macfadyen and Keeley Hawes and was directed by Jon S. Baird from a script by John Preston.

== Synopsis ==
The series is a part fictional/fact based account of how in November 1974 a prominent Labour British politician, John Stonehouse, the former Postmaster General within the Harold Wilson government and MP for Walsall North, disappeared from the beach of a luxury hotel in Miami, Florida. Stonehouse left only a neatly folded pile of clothes behind, after he swam into the sea to fake his own death.

Stonehouse faked his own death in a vain attempt to avoid disgracing his reputation. After engaging in espionage, forgery, theft and fraudulent activities, he was extradited to the UK from Australia.

== Cast ==
- Matthew Macfadyen as John Stonehouse
- Keeley Hawes as Barbara Smith/Stonehouse
- Emer Heatley as Sheila Buckley
- Kevin McNally as Harold Wilson
- Dorothy Atkinson as Betty Boothroyd
- Orla Hill as Jane Stonehouse
- Aoife Checkland as Julia Stonehouse
- Archie Barnes as Matthew Stonehouse
- Will Adamsdale as Harry Evans
- Igor Grabuzov as Alexander Marek
- Devon Black as Margaret Thatcher
- Ieva Andrejevaite as Irena Bala
- Timothy Walker as Charles Elwell

== Production ==
Filming took place around Birmingham, Stratford-upon-Avon and Leamington Spa. The series marked the first time real life husband and wife Macfadyen and Hawes have worked together since the BBC series Ashes to Ashes. Kevin McNally has previously appeared as Harold Wilson in the Kray twins 2015 bio-pic Legend, starring Tom Hardy.

Stonehouse's daughter Julia protested against her father's alleged spycraft for the East Bloc, both in this production and in the Channel 4 documentary The Spy Who Died Twice also about John Stonehouse.

== Broadcast ==
Stonehouse was broadcast in the UK on ITV and ITVX in three one-hour episodes on 2, 3 and 4 January 2023 from 9pm.

== Reception ==
Rebecca Nicholson of The Guardian awarded the drama four stars out of five, and called it "enormously entertaining". Carol Midgley of The Times described it as "a joy, chiefly thanks to Macfadyen’s witty, light-on-its-feet performance," whilst Hugo Rifkind, writing for the same newspaper, declared it "very funny" but was disappointed in the lack of nuance in its depiction of the title character.

The series was nominated for Best Single Drama or Mini-Series 1-3 EPS at the 2024 Broadcasting Press Guild Awards.
