= Thorpe affair =

1970s British political and sex scandal

Bessell's evidence against Thorpe, reported in the Daily Mirror during the pre-trial committal proceedings, November 1978

The Thorpe affair of the 1970s was a British political and sex scandal that ended the career of Jeremy Thorpe, the leader of the Liberal Party and Member of Parliament (MP) for North Devon. The scandal arose from allegations by Norman Josiffe (otherwise known as Norman Scott) that he and Thorpe had a homosexual relationship in the early 1960s, and that Thorpe had begun a badly planned conspiracy to murder Josiffe, who was threatening to expose their affair.

Thorpe, while admitting that the two had been friends, denied any such relationship. With the help of political colleagues and a compliant press, he was able to ensure that rumours of the affair went unreported for more than a decade. Scott's allegations were a persistent threat, however, and by the mid-1970s he was regarded as a danger both to Thorpe and to the Liberal Party, which was then enjoying a resurgence of popularity and was close to a place in government.

Attempts to buy or frighten Scott into silence were unsuccessful, and the problem deepened, until the fallout following the shooting of Scott’s dog during a possible murder attempt by a hired gunman in October 1975 brought the matter into the open. After further newspaper revelations, Thorpe was forced to resign the Liberal leadership in May 1976, and subsequent police investigations led to him being charged, along with three others, with conspiracy to murder Scott. Before the case came to trial, Thorpe lost his parliamentary seat at the 1979 general election.

At the trial in May 1979, the prosecution's case depended heavily on the evidence of Scott, Thorpe's former parliamentary colleague Peter Bessell, and the hired gunman, Andrew Newton. None of these witnesses impressed the court. Bessell's credibility was undermined by the revelations of his financial arrangements with The Sunday Telegraph. In his summing-up the judge was scathing about the prosecution's evidence, and all four defendants were acquitted. Nevertheless, Thorpe's public reputation was damaged irreparably by the case. He had chosen not to testify at the trial, which left several matters unexplained amid public disquiet.

Thorpe's retirement into private life was followed by the onset of Parkinson's disease in the mid-1980s, and he made few public statements afterwards. He eventually achieved a reconciliation with the North Devon Liberal Democrat constituency party, of which he was honorary president from 1988 until his death in 2014. Allegations of suppression of evidence by the police before the trial were under investigation from 2015, culminating in June 2018 when the police said that there was no new evidence and the case would remain closed.

== Background ==
=== Homosexuality and English law ===
Before the passage of the Sexual Offences Act 1967, which decriminalised most homosexual acts in England and Wales (but did not apply to Scotland or Northern Ireland which had their own laws criminalising homosexuality), all sexual activity between men was illegal throughout the United Kingdom, and carried heavy criminal penalties. Antony Grey, a secretary of the Homosexual Law Reform Society, wrote of "a hideous aura of criminality and degeneracy and abnormality surrounding the matter".

Political figures were particularly vulnerable to exposure; William Field, the Labour MP for Paddington North, was forced to resign his seat in 1953 after a conviction for soliciting in a public lavatory. In the following year Lord Montagu of Beaulieu, the youngest peer in the House of Lords, was imprisoned for a year after being convicted of "gross indecency", victim of a virulent "drive against male vice" led by the Home Secretary, Sir David Maxwell Fyfe.

Four years later public attitudes had changed little. When Ian Harvey, a junior Foreign Office minister in Harold Macmillan's government, was found guilty of indecent behaviour with a Coldstream Guardsman in November 1958, he lost both his ministerial job and his parliamentary seat at Harrow East. He was ostracised by the Conservative Party and by most of his former friends, and never again held a position in public life. Thus, anyone entering politics at that time knew that revelations of homosexual activity would likely bring such a career to a swift end.

=== Thorpe ===
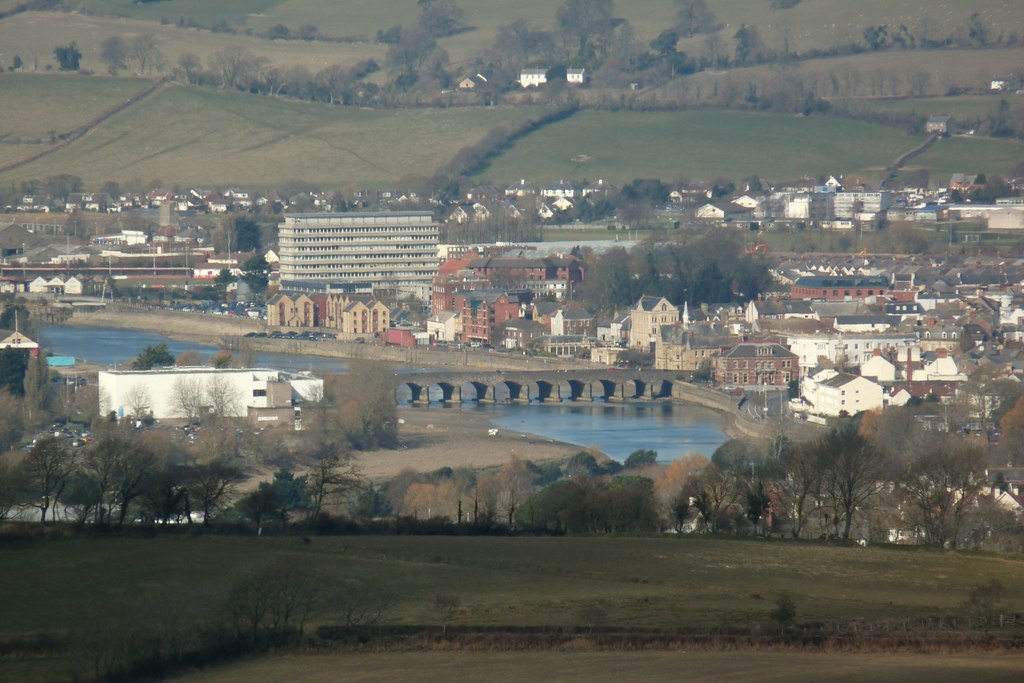
Barnstaple, the main town in Thorpe's North Devon constituency

John Jeremy Thorpe was born in 1929, the son and grandson of Conservative MPs. He attended Eton, then studied law at Trinity College, Oxford, where, having decided on a political career, he devoted his main energies to making a personal impact rather than to his studies. Rejecting his Conservative background, he joined the small, centrist Liberal Party—which by the late 1940s was a declining force in British politics, but still offered a national platform and a challenge to an ambitious young politician. He became secretary and eventually President of the Oxford Liberal Club, and met many of the party's leading figures. In the Hilary term (January–March) of 1950–51 Thorpe served as President of the Oxford Union.

In 1952, while studying at the Inner Temple prior to his call to the bar, Thorpe was adopted as prospective Liberal parliamentary candidate for the North Devon constituency, a Conservative-held seat where, at the 1951 general election, the Liberals had finished in third place behind Labour. Thorpe worked in the constituency tirelessly, using the slogan "A Vote for the Liberals is a Vote for Freedom", and at the 1955 general election, had halved the sitting Conservative MP James Lindsay's majority. Four years later, in October 1959, he captured the seat with a majority of 362, one of six successful Liberals in what was generally an electoral triumph for the Conservative Macmillan government.

The writer and former MP Matthew Parris described Thorpe as one of the more dashing among the new MPs elected in 1959. Thorpe's chief political interest lay in the field of human rights, and his speeches criticising apartheid in South Africa attracted the attention of the South African Bureau of State Security (BOSS), who took note of this rising star in the Liberal Party. Thorpe was briefly considered as best man at the 1960 wedding of his Eton contemporary Antony Armstrong-Jones to Princess Margaret, but was rejected when vetting checks indicated that he might have homosexual tendencies. The security agency MI5, which routinely keeps records on all Members of Parliament, added this information to Thorpe's file.

=== Josiffe, later named Scott ===
Norman Josiffe was born in Sidcup, Kent, on 12 February 1940—he did not assume the name Scott until 1967. His mother was Ena Josiffe, née Lynch; Albert Josiffe, her second husband, abandoned the family home soon after Norman's birth. Norman's early childhood was relatively happy and stable. After leaving school at 15 with no qualifications, he acquired a pony by means of an animal charity, and became a competent rider. When he was 16 he was prosecuted for the theft of a saddle and some pony feed, and was put on probation. With the encouragement of his probation officer he took lessons at Westerham Riding School at Oxted in Surrey, and eventually found work at a stable in Altrincham in Cheshire. After moving there he chose to cut all links with his family, and began to call himself "Lianche-Josiffe" ("Lianche" being a stylised version of "Lynch"). He also hinted at an aristocratic background, and of family tragedies that had left him orphaned and alone.

In 1959 Josiffe moved to the Kingham Stables in Chipping Norton, Oxfordshire, where he learned dressage while working as a groom. The stables were owned by Norman Vater, the self-made son of a coalminer who, like Josiffe, had inflated his name and was known as "Brecht Van de Vater". In the course of his rise, Vater had made numerous friends in higher social circles, among them Thorpe. Initially, Josiffe was settled and happy at the stables, but his relationship with Vater deteriorated in the face of the latter's assertive and demanding manner, and he was unable to form good relationships with his fellow-workers. He began to evidence the kind of behaviour which a journalist would later summarise as his "extraordinary talent for wheedling his way into people's sympathy before turning their lives to misery with his hysterical temper-tantrums."

=== Bessell ===
Peter Bessell, eight years older than Thorpe, had a successful business career before entering Liberal politics in the 1950s. He came to the party leadership's attention in 1955 when, as the Liberal candidate in the Torquay by-election, he substantially increased his party's vote in the first of a series of impressive Liberal results during the 1955–1959 parliament. He was subsequently selected as candidate for the more winnable constituency of Bodmin, and became both an admirer and personal friend of Thorpe, who in turn was impressed by Bessell's apparent business acumen. At Bodmin in the 1959 general election, Bessell reduced the Conservative majority, and he followed this in the October 1964 election with victory by over 3,000 votes. With the prestige of the letters "MP" after his name, Bessell set out in pursuit of serious money-making, while staying close to Thorpe whom he considered the likely next leader of the Liberal Party.

Bessell noted that Thorpe, for all his gregariousness and warmth, appeared to have no female friends and lacked any interest in women. The former Liberal MP Frank Owen confided to Bessell his suspicions that Thorpe was homosexual; other West Country Liberals had formed the same opinion. Aware that exposure as a gay man would end Thorpe's career, Bessell became his self-appointed protector, even to the extent, he later said, of falsely claiming to be bisexual, as a means of acquiring his friend's confidence.

=== Holmes ===
David Holmes, one of four assistant treasurers of the Liberal Party appointed by Thorpe in 1965, had been best man at Thorpe's wedding and was completely loyal to him. He was godfather to Thorpe's son Rupert, born in 1969. Holmes took over the role of Thorpe's protector after Bessell moved to the United States in January 1974. When charged in 1978, he was described as David Malcolm Holmes (48), merchant banker, of Eaton Place, Belgravia. He died in 1990, leaving a substantial fortune.

== Origins ==
=== Thorpe–Scott friendship ===
In late 1960 or early 1961, Thorpe visited Vater at the Kingham Stables, and briefly met Josiffe. He was sufficiently taken with the young man to suggest that, should Josiffe ever need help, he should call on him at the House of Commons. Soon after this, Josiffe left the stables after a serious disagreement with Vater. He then suffered a mental breakdown, and for much of 1961 was under psychiatric care. On 8 November 1961, a week after discharging himself from the Ashurst clinic in Oxford, Josiffe went to the House of Commons to see Thorpe. He was penniless, homeless and, worse, had left Vater's employment without the National Insurance card which, at that time, was essential for obtaining regular work and access to social and unemployment benefits. Thorpe promised he would help.

According to Josiffe's account, a homosexual liaison with Thorpe began that same evening, at the home of Thorpe's mother Ursula Thorpe (née Norton-Griffiths, 1903–1992) in Oxted and continued for several years. Thorpe, while acknowledging that a friendship developed, denied any sexual dimension in the relationship. (Note: In a statement to the police in June 1978, Thorpe wrote: "I believed that he was a person desperately in need of help and support in that he was in a suicidal and unbalanced state ... in the event my compassion and kindness towards him was in due course repaid by malevolence and resentment".) Thorpe organised accommodation for Josiffe in London, and a longer-term stay with a family in Barnstaple, in the North Devon constituency. He paid for advertisements in Country Life magazine, in an effort to find work with horses for his friend, arranged various temporary jobs, and promised to help Josiffe to realise an ambition to study dressage in France. On the basis of Josiffe's claim that his father had died in an air crash, Thorpe's solicitors investigated whether any money was due, but found that Albert Josiffe was alive and well in Orpington.

When, early in 1962, the police questioned Josiffe about the alleged theft of a suede jacket, Thorpe persuaded the investigating officer that Josiffe was recovering from mental illness, and was under his care. No further action was taken. In April 1962 Josiffe obtained a replacement National Insurance card which, he later said, was retained by Thorpe who had assumed the role of his employer. This was denied by Thorpe, and the "missing card" remained an ongoing source of grievance for Josiffe. He began to feel marginalised by Thorpe, and in December 1962, in a fit of depression, confided to a friend his intention to shoot the MP and commit suicide. The friend alerted the police, to whom Josiffe gave a detailed statement of his sexual relations with Thorpe, and produced letters to support his story. None of this evidence impressed the police sufficiently for them to take action, although a report on the matter was added to Thorpe's MI5 file.

In 1963, a relatively calm period in Josiffe's life as a riding instructor in Northern Ireland ended after he was seriously hurt in an accident at the Dublin Horse Show. He moved back to England, and eventually found a job at a riding school in Wolverhampton, where he stayed for several months before his erratic behaviour proved too much, and he was asked to leave. After a period of aimlessness in London, Josiffe saw an advertisement for a groom's post in Porrentruy in Switzerland. Thorpe used his influence to secure him the job. Josiffe left for Switzerland in December 1964, but returned to England almost immediately with complaints that conditions were impossible. In his hurry to depart he left his suitcase behind, which contained letters and other documents that, he believed, supported his claims to a sexual relationship with Thorpe.

=== Threats and counter-measures ===
Thorpe proved to be a lively and witty performer in the cut and thrust of parliamentary debates, and his presence in the House of Commons was soon noticed. In July 1962, in the wake of some disastrous Conservative by-election performances, Macmillan sacked seven cabinet ministers in what was known as the "Night of the Long Knives". Thorpe's comment—"Greater love hath no man than this, that he lay down his friends for his life"—was widely regarded in the press as the most apt verdict on the prime minister. Thorpe raised his political profile with effective attacks on government bureaucracy, and in the October 1964 general election was returned in North Devon with an increased majority. A year later he secured the office of Liberal Party treasurer, a significant step towards his ambition to become the next party leader.

By early 1965 Josiffe was in Dublin, where he worked at various horse-related jobs while continuing to harass Thorpe by letter about his missing luggage and the continuing National Insurance card issue. Thorpe rejected any responsibility for these matters. In mid-March 1965 Josiffe wrote a long letter to Thorpe's mother, which began: "For the last five years, as you probably know, Jeremy and I have had a homosexual relationship." The letter blamed Thorpe for awakening "this vice that lies latent in every man", and accused him of callousness and disloyalty. Ursula Thorpe gave the letter to her son, who drafted a quasi-legal statement rejecting the "damaging and groundless accusations" and accusing Josiffe of attempting to blackmail him. The document was never sent; instead, Thorpe turned to Bessell for advice.

Bessell, anxious to be of service to his party's highest-profile figure, flew to Dublin in April 1965. He found that Josiffe was being advised by a sympathetic Jesuit priest, Father Sweetman, who believed that at least some of Josiffe's allegations might be true; otherwise, he asked Bessell, why had he flown all the way from London to deal with them? Bessell warned Josiffe of the consequences of attempting to blackmail a public figure, but in a more conciliatory vein promised to help recover the missing luggage and insurance card. He also hinted at the possibility of an equestrian job in America. Bessell's intervention appeared to contain the problem, particularly as Josiffe's suitcase was recovered shortly afterwards—although letters implicating Thorpe had been removed. For most of the following two years Josiffe remained largely quiescent in Ireland, attempting to establish himself in various careers; part of this time was spent in a monastery. It was during this period that he formally adopted the name of Scott. (Note: "Scott" was the family name of Lord Eldon, near whom Josiffe had lived in Devon. He adopted the name in the hope that this would associate him with the aristocratic Eldon family.)

In April 1967 Scott wrote to Bessell from Ireland, asking for help in obtaining a passport in his changed name so that he could begin a new life in the United States. A second, less positive letter, dated July, indicated that Scott had returned to England and was once again in difficulties, with medical bills and other debts. His lack of an insurance card prevented him from claiming benefits. By this time, Thorpe had succeeded Jo Grimond as leader of the Liberal Party. (Note: In a rapidly organised election held by the 12 Liberal MPs after Grimond's sudden resignation in January 1967, Thorpe received six votes, his two rival candidates (Emlyn Hooson and Eric Lubbock) three apiece. The two stood down in Thorpe's favour, to make the vote unanimous.) To resolve Scott's immediate problems, and to prevent a resumption of his tirades against the new party leader, Bessell began paying him a "retainer" of between £5 and £10 a week, ostensibly in lieu of lost national insurance benefits. Bessell also arranged Scott's new passport, but by this time Scott had abandoned his American plans and wished to establish a career as a model. He asked Bessell for £200 to set him up; Bessell refused, but in May 1968 gave him £75, on the understanding there would be no further demands for a year.

== Developments ==
=== Incitement ===
Thorpe's leadership of the Liberals was not, initially, an unqualified success; his local campaigning skills did not readily transfer to set speeches on national or international issues, and some sections of the party became restless. His engagement to Caroline Allpass, announced in April 1968, reassured those in the party who had reservations about his private life; others were shocked by Thorpe's emphasis on the political motivation for the marriage—worth five points in the polls, he opined to Mike Steele, the party's press officer. For much of 1968 Thorpe was untroubled by Scott, who had acquired new friends and, according to Bessell, had burned his Thorpe letters. His reappearance in November 1968, again penniless and without prospect of work, was particularly unwelcome to Thorpe, as he fought to establish his leadership credentials. Bessell provided immediate relief by resuming the weekly cash retainer, but this was a short-term respite.

Early in December 1968 Bessell was summoned to Thorpe's office in the House of Commons. According to Bessell, Thorpe said of Scott: "We've got to get rid of him", and later: "It is no worse than shooting a sick dog." Bessell said later that he was unsure whether Thorpe was serious, but decided to play along, by discussing various ways of getting rid of Scott's body. Thorpe supposedly thought that disposal down one of Cornwall's many disused tin mines offered the best option, and also suggested his friend David Holmes as an appropriate assassin.

Bessell further maintained that in January 1969 Thorpe called him to a meeting together with Holmes, and that again Thorpe put forward suggestions for eliminating Scott. These were dismissed as impractical or ridiculous by Bessell and Holmes, who nevertheless agreed to give the matter further consideration. They hoped, said Bessell, that if they stalled, Thorpe would see the absurdity of his murder scheme and abandon it. Holmes, who largely confirmed Bessell's account of the meeting, later justified this decision on the grounds that "if we had simply said no, he might have gone elsewhere—and that might have led to an even greater disaster." According to Bessell and Holmes, discussions of the plan ended in May 1969, after the surprising news of Scott's wedding that month.

=== Party enquiry ===
By early 1971, Thorpe's political career had stalled. He had led the party to a disastrous performance in the general election of June 1970; in an unexpected victory for the Conservatives under Edward Heath, the Liberals lost seven of their thirteen parliamentary seats, and Thorpe's majority in North Devon fell to below 400. Bessell, with mounting business worries, did not stand for re-election in Bodmin. Thorpe faced censure for his conduct of a campaign during which he had spent extravagantly and left the party on the verge of bankruptcy; but the matter was put aside in a wave of sympathy when his wife Caroline was killed in a road accident 11 days after the election. Thorpe was devastated; he continued as leader, but for the next year performed little beyond routine party duties.

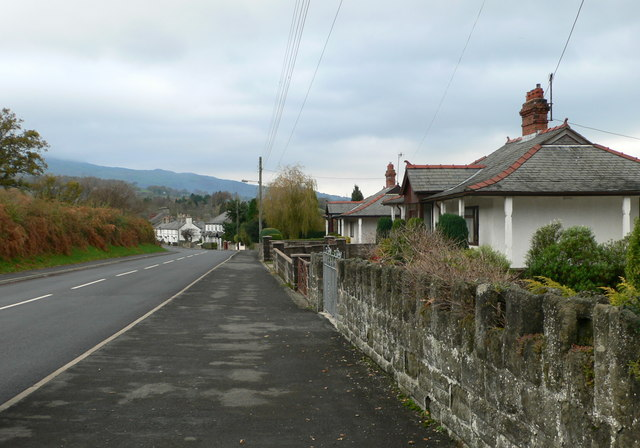
The village of Tal-y-bont, North Wales, where Scott lived in 1971

Meanwhile, Bessell's efforts ensured that for the time being the Scott threat was kept at bay. The missing insurance card meant that Scott's wife, who was pregnant, could not claim maternity benefits. Scott threatened to talk to newspapers, but the matter was resolved by the issue of an emergency card after Bessell's intervention at the Department of Health and Social Security. In 1970 Scott's marriage collapsed; he blamed Thorpe, and again threatened exposure. Bessell successfully prevented Thorpe's name being mentioned in court during the divorce proceedings, and arranged that Thorpe would anonymously pay the legal costs. Early in 1971 Scott moved to a cottage in the village of Tal-y-bont in North Wales, where he befriended a widow, Gwen Parry-Jones. He sufficiently persuaded her of his mistreatment at the hands of Thorpe that she contacted the Liberal MP for the adjoining constituency of Montgomeryshire—Emlyn Hooson, on the right wing of the party and a friend of neither Thorpe nor Bessell. Hooson suggested a meeting at the House of Commons.

On 26 and 27 May 1971 Scott told his story to Hooson and David Steel, the Liberals' chief whip. Neither was fully convinced, but felt the matter warranted further investigation. Against Thorpe's wishes, a confidential party enquiry was arranged for 9 June, to be chaired by Lord Byers, the leader of the Liberals in the House of Lords. At the enquiry Byers took a tough line against Scott, failing to offer him a chair and treating him, Scott said, "like a boy at school up before the headmaster." Byers's unsympathetic manner quickly unsettled Scott, who changed the details of his story several times and frequently broke down in tears. Byers suggested that Scott was a common blackmailer who needed psychiatric help. Declaring that Byers was a "pontificating old sod", Scott fled the room. The enquiry then questioned police officers about letters which Scott had shown to the police in 1962, but were told that these were inconclusive. Thorpe persuaded the Home Secretary, Reginald Maudling, and the Metropolitan Police Commissioner, John Waldron, to inform Byers that there was no police interest in Thorpe's activities, and no evidence of wrongdoing on his part. As a result, the enquiry dismissed Scott's allegations.

=== Further threats ===
Angry at his treatment by the Byers inquiry, Scott sought other means of pursuing his vendetta against Thorpe. In June 1971 he met Gordon Winter, a South African journalist who was also an agent for the South African intelligence agency BOSS. Scott provided details of his supposed seduction by Thorpe, a story which Winter assured his BOSS masters would destroy Thorpe and the Liberal Party. He found that no newspaper would print the story on largely uncorroborated and unreliable evidence. In March 1972 Scott's friend Gwen Parry-Jones died; Scott used the inquest to denounce Thorpe for ruining his life and driving Parry-Jones to her death. None of these accusations were published. Depressed, Scott retreated into a state of torpor, assisted by tranquillisers, and for a while presented no threat to Thorpe.

Auberon Waugh on Thorpe's election victory, February 1974
The most disappointing result has been Jeremy Thorpe's success in North Devon. Thorpe was already conceited enough, and now threatens to become one of the great embarrassments of politics. Soon I may have to reveal some of the things in my file on this revolting man.

— Private Eye, March 1974.

In 1972 and 1973 Thorpe's political fortunes, and those of the Liberals, revived. Thorpe's personal standing was enhanced when, on 14 March 1973, he married Marion, Countess of Harewood, whose former husband was a first cousin to the Queen. After a series of by-election victories and local government gains, an electoral breakthrough for the party looked plausible when Heath called a general election in February 1974. In that election, with more than six million votes (19.3% of those cast), the Liberals achieved by far their best election result since the Second World War, but under the first-past-the-post voting system this large vote translated into only 14 seats. As neither major party won an overall majority, these seats gave Thorpe (whose personal majority in North Devon increased to 11,072) significant leverage. He was briefly in coalition discussions with Heath, who was prepared to give cabinet posts to Thorpe and other senior Liberals. Thorpe later denied that there was any serious prospect of agreement, and in March 1974 Harold Wilson formed a minority Labour government. In the second 1974 general election, in October, Wilson achieved a narrow majority; the Liberals lost ground, with 5.3 million votes and 13 MPs. (Note: On 12 October 2002 Peter Oborne, writing in The Spectator, stated that after the October 1974 election Wilson requested details of Scott's National Insurance file from his Secretary of State for Social Services, Barbara Castle, who delegated this task to Jack Straw, then her special adviser. Straw, later Secretary of State for Foreign and Commonwealth Affairs in Tony Blair's government, has confirmed that he provided a report on the contents of the file. Although there is no record of any action on the basis of this report, Oborne calls this "an utterly disgraceful and disreputable operation: the abuse of the private records of a British citizen in order to smear or very possibly blackmail the leader of a rival political party"—while acknowledging that Straw may not have been fully in the picture.)

After Parry-Jones's death Scott lived quietly for a while in the West Country. In January 1974 he met Tim Keigwin, Thorpe's Conservative opponent in North Devon, and gave his version of his relationship with Thorpe. Keigwin was advised by the Conservative leadership that the material should not be used. Scott also confided in his doctor, Ronald Gleadle, who was treating him for depression. He had shown Gleadle his dossier of documents; the doctor, without Scott's knowledge or consent, sold the papers to Holmes, who had assumed the role of Thorpe's protector after Bessell settled permanently in California in January 1974. Holmes paid £2,500 for the documents, which were promptly burned in the home of Thorpe's solicitor. A further cache of papers was discovered in November 1974, by builders renovating a London office formerly used by Bessell. They found a briefcase containing letters and photographs that apparently compromised Thorpe, among them Scott's 1965 letter to Ursula Thorpe. Undecided what to do with their find, they took it to the Sunday Mirror newspaper. Sidney Jacobson, the paper's deputy chairman, decided not to publish the material and passed the briefcase and its content to Thorpe. Copies of the documents were kept in the newspaper's files.

=== Alleged conspiracy ===
In their analysis of the case, the journalists Simon Freeman and Barry Penrose state that Thorpe probably formed the outline of a plan to silence Scott early in 1974, after the latter's re-emergence became a matter of increasing concern. Holmes later said that Thorpe was insistent that Scott be killed: "[Jeremy felt] he would never be safe with that man around". Uncertain how to proceed, late in 1974 Holmes approached a business acquaintance, a carpet salesman named John Le Mesurier (not to be confused with the actor of that name). Le Mesurier introduced Holmes to George Deakin, a fruit machine salesman who, he thought, would have contacts with people who might be prepared to deal with Scott. Holmes and Le Mesurier concocted a story involving a blackmailer who needed to be frightened off; Deakin agreed to help. In February 1975 Deakin met Andrew Newton, an airline pilot, who said he was willing to deal with Scott for an appropriate fee—between £5,000 and £10,000 was suggested. Deakin put Newton in touch with Holmes. Newton always said that he had been hired to kill, not frighten, citing the size of the fee that he was offered—too much, he said, simply to scare someone.

While these arrangements proceeded, Thorpe wrote to Sir Jack Hayward, the Bahamas-based millionaire businessman, who had given generously to the Liberal Party in the past. In the wake of the Liberals' February 1974 election successes, Thorpe asked for £50,000 to replenish the party's funds. He further requested that £10,000 of this sum be paid, not into the party's regular accounts but to Nadir Dinshaw, an acquaintance of Thorpe's who was resident in the Channel Islands. Thorpe explained that this subterfuge was necessary to deal with a special category of unspecific election expenses. Hayward trusted Thorpe, and sent the £10,000 to Dinshaw who, instructed by Thorpe, passed the money to Holmes. After the October 1974 election Thorpe again requested funds from Hayward, and again asked that £10,000 be sent via the Dinshaw route. Hayward obliged, though this time with more reluctance and after some delay. No accounting of this £20,000 was ever provided; Holmes, Le Mesurier and Deakin all said that it was used to finance a "conspiracy to frighten", although they disagreed as to how much was spent. Thorpe later changed the story he had given Hayward about special categories of election expenses, and said he had deposited the sum with accountants "as an iron reserve against any shortage of funds at any subsequent election." He denied that he had authorised any payment to Newton or to anyone else connected with the case.

=== Shooting ===
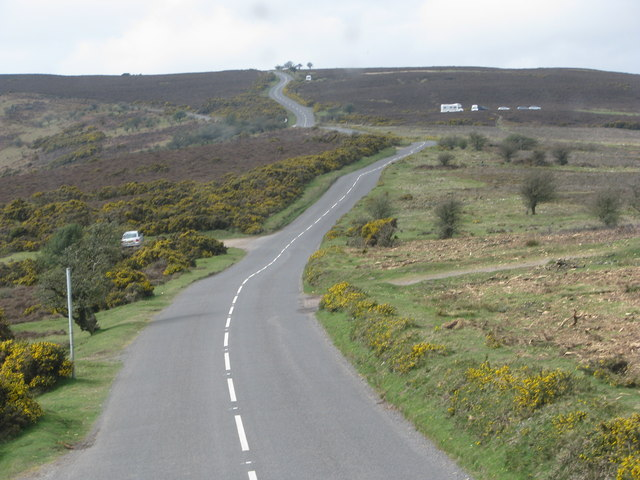
The moorland road above Porlock Hill, Somerset, close to the scene of the shooting

Newton met Holmes early in October 1975 when, according to Newton, Holmes was given a down payment on a fee of £10,000. Holmes later denied any such transaction, admitting only an agreement that Newton would carry out a frightening operation. On 12 October Newton, calling himself "Peter Keene", drove to Barnstaple in a yellow Mazda car where he approached Scott, claiming to have been hired to protect Scott from a supposed Canadian hit man. This seemed plausible to Scott, who had been beaten up a few weeks earlier, and he agreed to meet "Keene" at a later date. He was sufficiently cautious to ask a friend to make a note of the stranger's car registration number.

On 24 October Newton, now driving a Ford saloon, met Scott by arrangement in Combe Martin, just north of Barnstaple. Newton explained that he had to drive to Porlock, about 25 miles (40 km) away, and suggested that Scott accompany him—he and Scott could talk on the journey. Scott had with him his recently acquired pet dog, a Great Dane called Rinka; this disconcerted Newton, who was afraid of dogs, but Scott insisted that Rinka go with them. At Porlock, Newton left Scott and Rinka at a hotel while he supposedly dealt with his business. He picked them up shortly after 8 pm, and they began the drive back to Combe Martin. On a deserted stretch of road, Newton began to drive erratically, feigning tiredness, and accepted Scott's suggestion that he take over the driving. They stopped; Scott got out, followed by Rinka, and ran round to the driver's side, where he found Newton, gun in hand. Newton shot the dog in the head and, saying "It's your turn now", pointed the gun at Scott. The pistol failed to fire several times; eventually Newton jumped into the car and drove away, leaving Scott and the dead or dying dog by the roadside.

After Scott had been picked up in a distressed state by a passing car, the police were notified, and began enquiries. Newton was quickly identified through the Mazda's registration number, and arrested; his story was that Scott was blackmailing him and that the shooting had been intended to frighten him. He made no mention of any deal with Holmes, perhaps calculating that by keeping silent he would maximise his chances of payment from that quarter.

== Revelations ==
On 12 December 1975 Private Eye included another short teasing piece by Auberon Waugh which ended: "My only hope is that sorrow over his friend's dog will not cause Mr Thorpe's premature retirement from public life". By this time most newspapers knew of the stories surrounding Thorpe and Scott, but were wary of libel; according to Parris, by keeping silent they were "serving notice on Thorpe that they knew a bigger story must break, and could wait for it". In January 1976 Scott appeared before magistrates on a minor social security fraud charge, and stated that he was being hounded because of his previous sexual relationship with Thorpe. This claim, made in court and therefore protected from the libel laws, was widely reported.

The Daily Mail had meanwhile discovered Bessell's whereabouts in California, and on 3 February 1976 carried a long interview with the former MP. Bessell's claim that he had been blackmailed by Scott provided Thorpe with temporary cover. On 6 March newspapers reported Holmes's purchase of Scott's dossier from Gleadle, and a few days later David Steel discovered from Dinshaw, a personal friend, that £20,000 intended for the party had been diverted to Holmes and was unaccounted for. Steel told Thorpe that he should resign, but he refused. In an attempt to reassure his wavering parliamentary colleagues, on 14 March Thorpe made arrangements with The Sunday Times newspaper to publish a detailed rebuttal of Scott's charges, under the heading "The Lies of Norman Scott".

The "Bunnies" letter, February 1962
"Since my letters normally go to the House, yours arrived all by itself at my breakfast table at the Reform, and gave me tremendous pleasure. I cannot tell you just how happy I am to feel that you are really settling down ... you can always feel that whatever happens Jimmy and Mary are right behind you ... no more bloody clinics ... In haste. Bunnies can (and will) go to France. I miss you"

— Extracts from a letter from Thorpe to Josiffe, February 1962.

Newton's trial took place at Exeter Crown Court from 16 to 19 March 1976, where Scott repeated his allegations against Thorpe despite the efforts of the prosecution's lawyers to steer him away. Newton was found guilty of possessing a firearm with intent to endanger life, and sentenced to two years' imprisonment, but he did not incriminate Thorpe. (Note: In their account of Newton's trial, Barrie Penrose and Roger Courtiour note that in his cross-examination, "Scott was no easy pushover for a first-class London barrister ... His demeanour, his ability to answer questions sharply at times, was certainly different from the portraits which had been sketched of him in some of the popular Fleet Street tabloids".) Thorpe's difficulties increased when Bessell, fearing for his own position and perhaps scenting the possibility of making money, changed his stance and confessed in the Daily Mail on 6 May that he had lied to protect his former friend. A further concern for Thorpe was the danger that newspapers would publish letters he had sent to Scott early in their friendship. In an effort to forestall this, Thorpe arranged for the publication of two of the letters in The Sunday Times, a paper generally sympathetic towards him. In one of these letters Thorpe referred to Scott by the pet name "Bunnies". The tone of this letter convinced readers and commentators that Thorpe had not been frank about the nature of the relationship. On 10 May 1976 he resigned as Liberal leader amid rising criticism, again categorically denying Scott's allegations but acknowledging the damage that they were inflicting on the party.

After Thorpe's resignation the relative lack of press attention to the story for 18 months disguised the extent to which investigative reporting continued. Barry Penrose and Roger Courtiour, collectively known as "Pencourt", had originally been hired by Wilson after his retirement, to investigate the former prime minister's theory that Thorpe was a target of South African intelligence agencies. Pencourt's investigations led them to Bessell, who gave them his account of a conspiracy to murder Scott, and Thorpe's role in it. Before they could publish, they were scooped; Newton, released from prison in October 1977, sold his story to the London Evening News. He said that he had been paid £5,000 to kill Scott, and provided photographs of him receiving payment from Le Mesurier. (Note: The Pencourt File was serialised in the Daily Mirror from 30 January 1978, and published in book form later that year. Although heavily criticised by reviewers, it was much in evidence on the prosecution benches when the case came to court.) A lengthy police inquiry followed, at the end of which Thorpe, Holmes, Le Mesurier and Deakin were charged with conspiracy to murder. Thorpe was additionally charged with incitement to murder, on the basis of his 1969 meetings with Bessell and Holmes. After being released on bail, Thorpe declared: "I am totally innocent of this charge and will vigorously challenge it".

On 2 August 1978 Thorpe participated in a House of Commons debate about the future of Rhodesia, but thereafter played no further active part in parliament, although he remained North Devon's member. At the Liberals' 1978 annual assembly in Southport, he embarrassed the leadership by making a theatrical entrance and taking his place on the platform.

== Committal and trial ==
The prosecution set out its case at the pre-trial committal hearing, which began in Minehead on 20 November 1978. At the request of Deakin's counsel, reporting restrictions were lifted, which meant that newspapers were free to print anything said in court without fear of the libel laws. This move infuriated Thorpe, who had hoped for an in camera hearing which would avoid unfortunate newspaper headlines and perhaps lead to the dismissal of the case. Whatever the outcome, Thorpe knew that the adverse publicity would destroy his career, and that Scott would thus have his revenge. As the hearings began, Bessell described the 1969 meetings where he alleged that Thorpe had suggested that Holmes should kill Scott, including the comment about the shooting of a sick dog. The court learned that Bessell had a contract with The Sunday Telegraph, which was paying him £50,000 for his story. Dinshaw gave evidence of the £20,000 he had received from Hayward and passed to Holmes, and of subsequent attempts by Thorpe to obscure the details of these transactions. Newton testified that Holmes had wanted Scott killed: "He would prefer it if [Scott] vanished from the face of the earth and was never seen again. It was left to me how to do it". Scott gave clinical details of his alleged seduction by Thorpe at Thorpe's mother's house in November 1961 and on other occasions, and also recounted his ordeal on the moors above Porlock Hill. Scott contended that homosexuality was an incurable disease, with which Thorpe had infected him, and that Thorpe therefore should be held responsible for Scott's lifelong care. At the end of the hearing the presiding magistrate committed the four defendants for trial at the Central Criminal Court, commonly known as the Old Bailey.

In March 1979 the Labour government fell on a vote of no confidence, and a general election was called for 3 May. This led to a brief delay in the start of the trial as Thorpe, who still had a following among North Devon Liberals, was adopted as their candidate in the election. Largely isolated from his party's national campaign, he lost the seat to Conservative Antony Speller by over 8,000 votes. Private Eye's Auberon Waugh, a West Country resident and close follower of the case, mocked Thorpe by standing in the North Devon constituency as a candidate for the "Dog Lovers' Party". His election address ended: "Rinka is NOT forgotten. Rinka lives. Woof, woof. Vote Waugh to give all dogs the right to life, liberty and the pursuit of happiness". Thorpe obtained an injunction against the distribution of Waugh's election literature. Waugh received 79 votes, as against 31,811 for the winning Conservative and 23,338 for Thorpe.

The trial began on 8 May, under Sir Joseph Cantley, a relatively obscure High Court judge with limited experience of high-profile cases. To conduct his defence Thorpe engaged George Carman, who had established a criminal law practice on the Northern Circuit in Manchester; this was his first high-profile national case. Carman undermined Bessell's credibility by revealing his financial interest in Thorpe's conviction: his newspaper contract provided that in the event of acquittal, only half the £50,000 would be paid. In his 2016 account of the Thorpe affair, John Preston records that after observing Bessell's demeanour in court, the Sunday Telegraph cancelled its contract with him. The judge left no doubt as to his own low opinion of Bessell's character; Auberon Waugh, who was writing a book on the trial, thought that Cantley's general attitude to other prosecution witnesses became increasingly one-sided. On 7 June Deakin testified that although he had put Newton in touch with Holmes, he had thought that this was to help someone to deal with a blackmailer—he knew nothing of a conspiracy to kill. Deakin was the only defendant to testify; the others all chose to remain silent and call no witnesses, believing that, based on the testimonies of Bessell, Scott and Newton, the prosecution had failed to make its case. During his closing speech on behalf of Thorpe, Carman raised the possibility that Holmes and others might have organised a conspiracy without Thorpe's knowledge.

On 18 June the judge began his summing-up. He drew the jury's attention to the previous good character of the defendants, whom he characterised as "men of hitherto unblemished reputation." (Note: Preston points out that this statement was inaccurate: Deakin had a prior conviction for receiving stolen property, while in 1976 Thorpe had been criticised in a Department of Trade report for his part in the 1973 collapse of the London and County Securities Group, of which he had been a director.) Cantley described Thorpe as "a national figure with a very distinguished public record". The judge was scathing about the principal witnesses: Bessell was a "humbug" whose contract with The Sunday Telegraph was "deplorable"; Scott was a fraud, a sponger, a whiner, a parasite—"but of course he could still be telling the truth. It is a question of belief." Newton was characterised as a perjurer and a chump, "determined to milk the case as hard as he can." The mystery surrounding the £20,000 that Thorpe had obtained from Hayward was dismissed as an irrelevance: "The fact that a man obtains money by deceit does not [prove] that the man was a member of a conspiracy." Waugh felt that the judge's lack of even-handedness could well provoke a counteraction against the accused from the jury. The summing-up became the subject of a scathing parody by the satirist Peter Cook.

== Acquittal and aftermath ==
Thorpe on the trial
All three [principal prosecution witnesses] had ... been destroyed in cross-examination, and the prosecution's case at its close was shot through with lies, inaccuracies and admissions to such an extent that the defence decided not to give evidence. To have done so would have prolonged the trial unnecessarily.

— Jeremy Thorpe, In My Own Time

The jury retired during the morning of 20 June. They returned just over two days later, and acquitted all four defendants on all charges. (Note: In their account of the trial, Chester et al. record that the incitement charge against Thorpe was dismissed by the jury at the start of their deliberations. On the conspiracy charge they were initially divided equally, six against six, but in the course of discussions moved to 11–1 in favour of acquittal. Their long absence from the court was due to their wish to record a unanimous verdict.) The judge awarded costs to Deakin, but not to Holmes or Le Mesurier whom he thought had been insufficiently co-operative in the enquiry. Thorpe made no application for costs. In a brief public statement, he said that he considered the verdict as "totally fair, just and a complete vindication." David Steel, on behalf of the Liberal Party, welcomed the verdict as "a great relief", and hoped that Thorpe would, "after a suitable period of rest and recuperation ... find many avenues where his great talents may be used." In North Devon Thorpe's acquittal was celebrated with a thanksgiving service at which the presiding vicar, The Rev. John Hornby, gave thanks to God "for the ministry of His servant Jeremy ...The darkness is now past and the true light shines. This is the day the Lord hath made! Now is the day of our salvation!"

Despite the acquittal, the broader public perception was strong that Thorpe had not behaved well, nor had he adequately explained himself. Ronald Herniman, the Archdeacon of Barnstaple, who was critical of Hornby's melodramatic thanksgiving service, wrote: "There is a great deal of unhappiness about the result at the Old Bailey. As far as most people are concerned, the trial ended with a big question mark over the case". Prevented by his party from a return to active politics, in 1982 Thorpe was appointed by Amnesty International as director of its British section, but after protests from the organisation's staff, he withdrew. Not long afterwards, Thorpe first showed signs of the Parkinson's disease that led to his almost complete withdrawal into private life in the mid-1980s. There was a political reconciliation when, in 1988, following the merger of the Liberals and the Social Democratic Party, the newly formed North Devon Liberal Democrat association made him their honorary president. When he attended the Liberal Democrat party conference in 1997 he received a standing ovation. In 1999, Thorpe published his political memoir, In My Own Time, in which he justified his silence at the trial, and stated that he had never doubted the outcome. Nine years later, in January 2008, Thorpe gave his first press interview in 25 years, to The Guardian. Referring to the affair he said: "If it happened now I think the public would be kinder. Back then they were very troubled by it ... It offended their set of values." Thorpe died on 4 December 2014.

After the trial Le Mesurier kept a low profile, after unsuccessful attempts to sell "the real story" to national newspapers. In June 1981, in a series of articles printed in the News of the World, Holmes reasserted his allegation that Thorpe had asked him to kill Scott: "The incitement charge which Jeremy faced was true, and if I had gone into the witness box I'd have had to tell the truth." Holmes, who died in 1990, had previously admitted his participation in a conspiracy to "frighten" Scott, though not to kill him. Bessell's account of the affair was published in America in 1980. He died in 1985; his final years were devoted to a campaign to stop the erosion of the San Diego beaches in California. Newton, like Le Mesurier, attempted to cash in on the case, but failed to find a newspaper willing to print his story. Scott's comments on the affair, immediately after the trial verdict, were that he was unsurprised by the outcome, but was upset by the aspersions on his character made by the judge from the safety of the bench. In December 2014, Scott, then aged 74, was reported to have recently relocated from Devon to Ireland, although John Preston, in his 2016 account, places him "in a village on Dartmoor ... with seventy hens, three horses, a cat, a parrot, a canary, and five dogs."

In a BBC investigative documentary broadcast in December 2014, an antique firearms collector named Dennis Meighan claimed that he had been hired by an unidentified senior Liberal to kill Scott, for a fee of £13,500. Having initially agreed, Meighan says, he changed his mind, but provided Newton with the gun used in the shooting. After confessing to the police, he was asked to sign a prepared statement which, according to him, "left everything out that was incriminating, but at the same time everything I said about the Liberal Party, Jeremy Thorpe, et cetera, was left out as well." The BBC's Tom Mangold said that Meighan's account, if true, indicated the existence of "a conspiracy at the very highest level". In 2016 the Avon and Somerset police passed their files to Gwent Police, for an independent review of the original investigation. After the police came to the conclusion that Andrew Newton had died, the Crown Prosecution Service closed the case. In 2018, Gwent Police reported that they had "now revisited these enquiries and have identified information which indicates that Newton may still be alive", therefore re-opening lines of inquiry. On 4 June 2018 the force announced that they had interviewed Newton, who had been living under a new name, Hann Redwin, in Dorking, Surrey, but that he had given no new useful information, and so the case would remain closed.

== In popular media ==
At the 1979 Secret Policeman's Ball, in aid of Amnesty International, the biased summing up speech by Mr Justice Cantley was parodied by Peter Cook. The sketch was written and delivered shortly after the trial, and was, according to Freeman and Penrose, "actually not that different from the original". The nine-minute opus, "Entirely a Matter for You", is considered to be one of the finest works of Cook's career. Cook and show producer Martin Lewis brought out an album on Virgin Records entitled Here Comes the Judge: Live of the live performance together with three studio tracks that further lampooned the Thorpe trial.

In 2016, approximately a year and a half after Thorpe's death, Viking Press published A Very English Scandal, a true crime non-fiction novel about the affair by journalist John Preston. In May 2018, BBC One broadcast a three-part television miniseries adaptation of the book, written by Russell T Davies, likewise titled A Very English Scandal, directed by Stephen Frears and starring Hugh Grant as Thorpe and Ben Whishaw as Scott.
