= A Very English Scandal =

Crime non-fiction novel by John Preston

A Very English Scandal: Sex, Lies and a Murder Plot at the Heart of the Establishment
- The front cover of the first edition (hardcover)
- Author: John Preston
- Language: English
- Genre: Non-fiction; True crime
- Publisher: Viking Press
- Publication date: 5 May 2016
- Publication place: United Kingdom
- Media type: Print (hardback and paperback), e-book, audiobook
- Pages: 340
- ISBN: 978-0-241-21572-2 (Hardcover)

A Very English Scandal is a true crime non-fiction novel by John Preston. It was first published on 5 May 2016 by Viking Press and by Other Press in the United States. The novel details the 1970s Thorpe affair in Britain, in which former Liberal Party leader Jeremy Thorpe was tried and acquitted of conspiring to murder his alleged former lover, Norman Scott.

== Synopsis ==
In 1979, former Member of Parliament Jeremy Thorpe stood trial over accusations that he hired a hitman to kill his alleged ex-lover, Norman Scott. A Very English Scandal chronicles Thorpe's early, secretive love life, at a time when sexual activity between men was illegal, and his subsequent public exposure. The novel also details Thorpe's trial and eventual acquittal.

== Reception ==
Nicholas Shakespeare, writing in The Telegraph, gave the novel five stars out of five, noting that Preston "tells this complicated story of cack-handed assassins, buffoonish policemen, dodgy Home Secretaries and sozzled judges simply and with relish." The Guardian's Chris Mullin described the novel as "a real page-turner", adding that it is "probably the most forensic, elegantly written and compelling account of one of the 20th century’s great political scandals".

The New York Times' Marilyn Stasio agreed that "Preston has written this page-turner like a political thriller", but wrote that "no matter how hard he tries...his central character comes off as selfish, arrogant and manipulative". Meanwhile, The Spectator's Andrew Lycett noted that "For all his pleasing authorial touches, Preston adds little to a well-bruited story."

== Adaptation ==
The BBC announced a three-part television miniseries based on the book in May 2017. It was shown in the UK on BBC One in May and June 2018. The series was written by Russell T Davies and directed by Stephen Frears, with Hugh Grant and Ben Whishaw starring as Thorpe and Scott.
