= John Preston (English author) =

English journalist and novelist (born 1953)

- Born: 1953 (age 72–73)
- Education: Marlborough College
- Occupations: Journalist, novelist
- Notable work: A Very English Scandal
- Spouse: Susanna Gross
- Relatives: John Gross (father-in-law); Miriam Gross (mother-in-law); Tom Gross (brother-in-law); Margaret Guido (aunt)

John Preston (born 1953) is an English journalist, novelist and screenwriter. He is the author of books and screenplays which became successful films on Netflix (The Dig with Ralph Fiennes, Lily James and Carey Mulligan) and award-winning series on BBC (A Very English Scandal with Hugh Grant) and on ITV (Stonehouse, with Matthew Macfadyen).

== Career ==
John Preston attended Marlborough College in Wiltshire from 1967 to 1971. He worked as the Arts Editor of The Evening Standard and The Sunday Telegraph. He was The Sunday Telegraph's television critic for ten years and one of its chief feature writers.

Preston wrote four novels between 1996 and 2007. All are set in England in the recent past: Ghosting in the world of radio and television in the 1950s; Ink in the dying days of Fleet Street's importance in journalism in the 1980s; Kings of the Roundhouse in strife-torn London in the 1970s; and The Dig in the 1930s. Preston wrote The Dig, a novelised account of the Sutton Hoo archaeological dig, after discovering that his aunt had been one of the key participants. The Dig has been made into a feature film starring Ralph Fiennes, Carey Mulligan, and Lily James, released on Netflix in 2021.

A Very English Scandal, Preston's non-fiction account of the Jeremy Thorpe affair of the 1970s, was adapted into a television miniseries starring Hugh Grant and Ben Whishaw in 2018. His 2020 non-fiction book, Fall: The Mystery of Robert Maxwell, won the Costa Book Award for biographies in 2021, and is being adapted for television by Working Title. In 2022, Preston authored the script for Stonehouse, a television series biography of disgraced politician John Stonehouse.

Preston's most recent book, Watford Forever, examining the takeover of Watford F.C. by Sir Elton John and written in collaboration with John himself, was published in November 2023.

In 2022, Preston worked as the screenwriter on Runners, a television drama series about the Bow Street Runners, and in late 2023 he worked on a mini-series based on Liz Truss's short-lived tenure as Prime Minister, entitled 49 Days.

== Critical assessments ==
The Sunday Times reviewer of Ink said, "With a rare gift for both humour and desolation, Preston is a brilliant new player in the field of serious comedy." Reviewing Kings of the Roundhouse in The Guardian, Harry Ritchie called it "that unusual thing – an intelligent comic novel that really is very funny". The Labour politician Chris Mullin said A Very English Scandal was "probably the most forensic, elegantly written and compelling account of one of the 20th century's great political scandals ... a real page-turner" and an "entertaining mix of tragedy and farce". The Guardian's reviewer of Fall praised Preston's "great skill at exposing hypocrisy and subterfuge" and his "eye for the telling detail and an ear for the revealing quote".

== Family ==
Preston lives in London. He was married to journalist and bridge columnist Susanna Gross from 2005 until her death in 2025. His brother-in law is political commentator Tom Gross.

== Books ==
- Touching the Moon (1991; non-fiction, about a trip to the Mountains of the Moon in Uganda)
- Ghosting (1996; novel)
- Ink (1999; novel)
- Kings of the Roundhouse (2006; novel)
- The Dig (2007; novel)
- A Very English Scandal: Sex, Lies and a Murder Plot at the Heart of the Establishment (2016; non-fiction, on the Jeremy Thorpe affair)
- Fall: The Mystery of Robert Maxwell (2020; non-fiction)
- Watford Forever (with Sir Elton John; 2023; non-fiction)
