= North Devon (constituency) =

Parliamentary constituency in the United Kingdom, 1950 onwards

- County constituency for the House of Commons
- Boundary of North Devon in South West England
- County: Devon
- Electorate: 76,455 (2023)
- Major settlements: Barnstaple and Ilfracombe

Current constituency
- Created: 1950
- Member of Parliament: Ian Roome (Liberal Democrats)
- Seats: One
- Created from: Barnstaple and South Molton

1832–1885
- Seats: Two
- Type of constituency: County constituency
- Created from: Devon
- Replaced by: South Molton; Barnstaple; Tiverton; Honiton

North Devon is a constituency (Note: A county constituency (for the purposes of election expenses and type of returning officer)) represented in the House of Commons of the UK Parliament since 2024 by Ian Roome of the Liberal Democrats.

== Constituency profile ==
North Devon is a constituency in Devon and is coterminous with the local government district of the same name. It covers a coastal region along the Bristol Channel and a large, rural inland area. Its largest town is Barnstaple, which has a population of around 33,000. Other settlements include the towns of Ilfracombe, Lynton, South Molton and Chulmleigh and the villages of Fremington and Braunton.

This is a rural constituency with seaside resort towns and many small villages. Barnstaple is an ancient town that grew from rural industry and shipbuilding. The coastal area is popular with tourists; the seaside village of Woolacombe and its surroundings contain numerous holiday parks. The constituency has average levels of wealth; there is some deprivation in Barnstaple and Ilfracombe whilst the area around Braunton is mostly affluent. House prices across the constituency are similar to the national and regional averages.

The constituency has a large retired population and a low proportion of young adults. In general, residents have below-average levels of education and average rates of homeownership. Household income is below average and the child poverty rate is in line with the rest of the country. A high proportion of residents work in the agriculture and tourism sectors and the percentage claiming unemployment benefits is lower than the country as a whole. White people made up 97% of the population at the 2021 census.

At the local council level, Barnstaple and its surroundings are represented by Liberal Democrats, Ilfracombe by Green Party councillors and the inland areas by a mixture of Reform UK, Conservatives and independents. An estimated 57% of voters in North Devon supported leaving the European Union in the 2016 referendum, higher than the UK-wide figure of 52%.

== Boundaries ==
Map of current boundaries

1832–1868: The Hundreds of Bampton, Black Torrington, Braunton, Crediton, Fremington, Halberton, Hartland, Hayridge, Hemyock, North Tawton and Winkleigh, Shebbear, Sherwill, South Molton, Tiverton, Witheridge, and West Budleigh.

1868–1885: The Hundreds of Bampton, Braunton, Crediton, Fremington, Halberton, Hartland, Hayridge, Hemyock, North Tawton, Shebbear, Sherwill, South Molton, Tiverton, Winkleigh, Witheridge, and West Budleigh.

1950–1974: The Boroughs of Barnstaple and South Molton, the Urban Districts of Ilfracombe and Lynton, and the Rural Districts of Barnstaple and South Molton.

1974–1983: The Boroughs of Barnstaple and Bideford, the Urban Districts of Ilfracombe, Lynton, and Northam, and the Rural Districts of Barnstaple, Bideford, and South Molton.

1983–2010: The District of North Devon, and the District of Mid Devon wards of Taw, Taw Vale, and West Creedy.

2010–present: The District of North Devon.

The 2023 Periodic Review of Westminster constituencies left the boundaries unchanged.

== History ==
Context: 1832-1868. Extract from 1837 result: the main striped area at centre

A two-seat constituency of the same name existed from 1832 to 1885, formally titled the 'Northern Division of Devon'.

This began at the 1832 general election, when the Reform Act 1832 divided the former two-seat Devon into Northern and Southern divisions, each of which elected two MPs using the bloc vote system of election. The constituency was abolished for the 1885 general election, when the Redistribution of Seats Act split the county into smaller single-seat divisions. Its second creation is current, and began at the 1950 general election (covering a smaller area than before). Prior to 1950, its territory was split between the old constituencies of Barnstaple and South Molton.

In the 20th century this area had a prominent national MP, Jeremy Thorpe, who led a Liberal Party revival countrywide, with particular strength in the south-west. The Liberal Democrats and its predecessor the Liberal Party have, since the Second World War, performed strongly in this seat; it was held for twenty years by Thorpe as the Liberal leader. He lost it in the 1979 general election, amid a scandal as a married man in love with Norman Scott and Thorpe's alleged involvement in a plot to murder him, of which he was found not guilty the same year.

At the 1992 general election Liberal Democrat Nick Harvey regained the seat from the Conservatives. He held the seat for 23 years until he lost it at the 2015 general election. Conservatives Peter Heaton-Jones, then Selaine Saxby held the seat for the next nine years, until it switched back to the Liberal Democrats in 2024, with the election of Ian Roome.

== Members of Parliament ==
=== MPs 1832–1885 ===
Election	First member	First party	Second member	Second party
1832	Viscount Ebrington	Whig	Hon. Newton Fellowes	Whig
1837	Viscount Ebrington	Whig	Sir Thomas Dyke Acland, Bt	Conservative
1839 by-election	Lewis William Buck	Conservative	Sir Thomas Dyke Acland, Bt	Conservative
1857	James Wentworth Buller	Whig	Charles Trefusis	Conservative
1859	James Wentworth Buller	Liberal	Charles Trefusis	Conservative
1865 by-election	Sir Thomas Dyke Acland, Bt	Liberal	Charles Trefusis	Conservative
1866 by-election	Sir Thomas Dyke Acland, Bt	Liberal	Sir Stafford Northcote, Bt	Conservative
1885 by-election	Sir Thomas Dyke Acland, Bt	Liberal	John Moore-Stevens	Conservative
1885	constituency abolished by Redistribution of Seats Act			

=== MPs since 1950 ===
The Member of Parliament for the constituency is Ian Roome of the Liberal Democrats who succeeded the previous Conservative MP Selaine Saxby at the 2024 general election.

Election	Member	Party
1950	Christopher Peto	Conservative
1955	James Lindsay	Conservative
1959	Jeremy Thorpe	Liberal
1979	Tony Speller	Conservative
1992	Nick Harvey	Liberal Democrats
2015	Peter Heaton-Jones	Conservative
2019	Selaine Saxby	Conservative
2024	Ian Roome	Liberal Democrats

== Elections ==
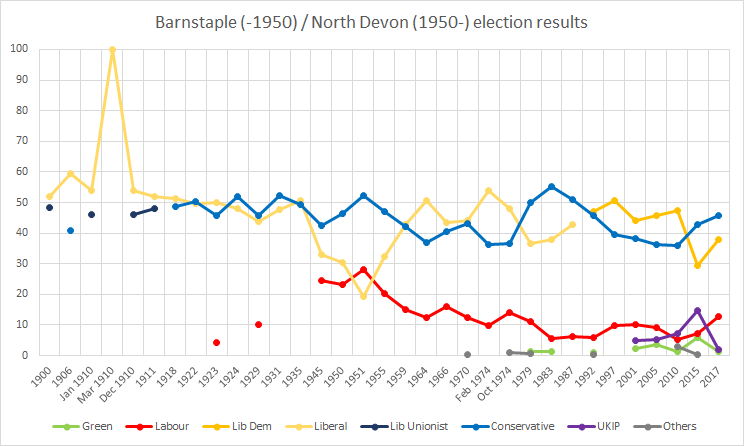
North Devon historical election results

=== Elections in the 2020s ===
General election 2024: North Devon
Party	Candidate	Votes	%	±%
Liberal Democrats	Ian Roome	21,820	42.4	+12.4
Conservative	Selaine Saxby	15,076	29.3	−27.3
Reform	Nigel James	8,137	15.8	N/A
Labour	Nicky Edwards	3,216	6.3	−2.9
Green	Cassius Lay	2,348	4.6	+1.4
Independent	Steve Cotten	820	1.6	+0.6
Majority		6,744	13.1	N/A
Turnout		51,417	65.0	−7.7
Registered electors		79,068		
Liberal Democrats gain from Conservative		Swing	+19.9	

=== Elections in the 2010s ===
General election 2019: North Devon
Party	Candidate	Votes	%	±%
Conservative	Selaine Saxby	31,479	56.5	+10.7
Liberal Democrats	Alex White	16,666	29.9	−8.1
Labour	Finola O'Neill	5,097	9.1	−3.6
Green	Robbie Mack	1,759	3.2	+1.8
Independent	Steve Cotten	580	1.0	N/A
Majority		14,813	26.6	+18.8
Turnout		55,581	73.3	+0.1
Conservative hold		Swing		

General election 2017: North Devon
Party	Candidate	Votes	%	±%
Conservative	Peter Heaton-Jones	25,517	45.8	+3.1
Liberal Democrats	Nick Harvey	21,185	38.0	+8.6
Labour	Mark Cann	7,063	12.7	+5.6
UKIP	Steve Crowther	1,187	2.1	−12.7
Green	Ricky Knight	753	1.4	−4.4
Majority		4,332	7.8	−5.5
Turnout		55,705	73.2	+3.0
Conservative hold		Swing	−2.7	

General election 2015: North Devon
Party	Candidate	Votes	%	±%
Conservative	Peter Heaton-Jones	22,341	42.7	+6.7
Liberal Democrats	Nick Harvey	15,405	29.4	−18.0
UKIP	Steve Crowther	7,719	14.8	+7.6
Labour	Mark Cann	3,699	7.1	+1.9
Green	Ricky Knight	3,018	5.8	+4.4
Communist	Gerry Sables	138	0.3	+0.1
Majority		6,936	13.3	+1.9
Turnout		52,453	70.2	+1.3
Conservative gain from Liberal Democrats		Swing	+12.3	

General election 2010: North Devon
Party	Candidate	Votes	%	±%
Liberal Democrats	Nick Harvey	24,305	47.4	+0.9
Conservative	Philip Milton	18,484	36.0	+0.3
UKIP	Steve Crowther	3,720	7.2	+2.0
Labour	Mark Cann	2,671	5.2	−3.7
Green	L'Anne Knight	697	1.4	−2.3
BNP	Gary Marshall	614	1.2	N/A
Independent	Rodney Cann	588	1.1	N/A
English Democrat	Nigel Vidler	146	0.3	N/A
Communist	Gerry Sables	96	0.2	N/A
Majority		5,821	11.4	+1.8
Turnout		51,321	68.9	+0.6
Liberal Democrats hold		Swing	+0.6	

=== Elections in the 2000s ===
General election 2005: North Devon
Party	Candidate	Votes	%	±%
Liberal Democrats	Nick Harvey	23,840	45.9	+1.7
Conservative	Orlando Fraser	18,868	36.3	−1.9
Labour	Mark Cann	4,656	9.0	−1.1
UKIP	John Browne	2,740	5.3	+0.3
Green	Ricky Knight	1,826	3.5	+1.1
Majority		4,972	9.6	+3.6
Turnout		51,930	68.1	−0.2
Liberal Democrats hold		Swing	+1.8	

General election 2001: North Devon
Party	Candidate	Votes	%	±%
Liberal Democrats	Nick Harvey	21,784	44.2	−6.6
Conservative	Clive Allen	18,800	38.2	−1.3
Labour	Vivian Gale	4,995	10.1	+0.3
UKIP	Roger Knapman	2,484	5.0	N/A
Green	Anthony Bown	1,191	2.4	N/A
Majority		2,984	6.0	−5.3
Turnout		49,254	68.3	−9.4
Liberal Democrats hold		Swing	−5.8 (Note: This was in 2001 the largest two-party swing locally, (LD-UKIP))	

=== Elections in the 1990s ===
General election 1997: North Devon
Party	Candidate	Votes	%	±%
Liberal Democrats	Nick Harvey	27,824	50.8	+3.7
Conservative	Richard Ashworth	21,643	39.5	−6.2
Labour	Eithne "Annie" Brenton	5,347	9.8	+3.9
Majority		6,181	11.3	+9.9
Turnout		54,814	77.7	−6.7
Liberal Democrats hold		Swing	+5.0	

General election 1992: North Devon
Party	Candidate	Votes	%	±%
Liberal Democrats	Nick Harvey	27,414	47.1	+4.3
Conservative	Tony Speller	26,620	45.7	−5.2
Labour	Paul Donner	3,410	5.9	−0.4
Green	Cathrine Simmons	658	1.1	N/A
Natural Law	Gray Treadwell	107	0.2	N/A
Majority		794	1.4	N/A
Turnout		58,209	84.4	+2.7
Liberal Democrats gain from Conservative		Swing	+4.7	

=== Elections in the 1980s ===
General election 1987: North Devon
Party	Candidate	Votes	%	±%
Conservative	Tony Speller	28,071	50.9	−4.2
Liberal	Michael Pinney	23,602	42.8	+4.9
Labour	Ann Marjoram	3,467	6.3	+0.6
Majority		4,469	8.1	−9.1
Turnout		55,140	81.7	+1.6
Conservative hold		Swing	−4.6	

General election 1983: North Devon
Party	Candidate	Votes	%	±%
Conservative	Tony Speller	28,066	55.1	+4.7
Liberal	Roger Blackmore	19,339	37.9	+1.5
Labour	Peter James	2,893	5.7	−5.6
Ecology	Roger Joanes	669	1.3	−0.1
Majority		8,727	17.2	+3.2
Turnout		50,967	80.1	−1.6
Conservative hold		Swing	+1.6	

=== Elections in the 1970s ===
General election 1979: North Devon
Party	Candidate	Votes	%	±%
Conservative	Tony Speller	31,811	50.1	+13.5
Liberal	Jeremy Thorpe	23,338	36.7	−11.4
Labour	Antony John Saltern	7,108	11.2	−3.0
Ecology	Tony Whittaker	729	1.2	N/A
National Front	John Morley Price	237	0.4	N/A
English National	Frank Hansford-Miller	142	0.2	−0.8
Dog Lover's Party	Auberon Waugh	79	0.1	N/A
Wessex Regionalists	Henrietta Elizabeth Rous	50	0.1	N/A
Democratic Monarchist Public Safety White Resident	Bill Boaks	20	0.0	N/A
Majority		8,473	13.4	N/A
Turnout		63,514	81.7	+7.1
Conservative gain from Liberal		Swing	+12.45	

General election October 1974: North Devon
Party	Candidate	Votes	%	±%
Liberal	Jeremy Thorpe	28,209	48.1	−5.8
Conservative	Tony Speller	21,488	36.6	+0.2
Labour	Alexandra Jessie Golant	8,536	14.2	+4.5
English National	Frank Hansford-Miller	568	1.0	N/A
Majority		6,721	11.5	−6.0
Turnout		58,621	74.58	−11.9
Liberal hold		Swing	−3.0	

General election February 1974: North Devon
Party	Candidate	Votes	%	±%
Liberal	Jeremy Thorpe	34,052	53.9	+9.8
Conservative	Timothy Carleton Keigwin	22,980	36.4	−5.8
Labour	Terence Kendrick Marston	6,140	9.7	−2.6
Majority		11,072	17.5	+16.6
Turnout		63,172	86.49	+1.6
Liberal hold		Swing	+7.8	

General election 1970: North Devon
Party	Candidate	Votes	%	±%
Liberal	Jeremy Thorpe	18,893	44.1	+0.5
Conservative	Timothy Carleton Keigwin	18,524	43.2	+2.7
Labour	Chris Mullin	5,268	12.3	−3.6
Democratic Party	Barry Gray Morris	175	0.4	N/A
Majority		369	0.9	−2.2
Turnout		42,860	84.9	−0.4
Liberal hold		Swing	+1.1	

=== Elections in the 1960s ===
General election 1966: North Devon
Party	Candidate	Votes	%	±%
Liberal	Jeremy Thorpe	16,797	43.6	−7.1
Conservative	Timothy Carleton Keigwin	15,631	40.5	+3.5
Labour	James H. Rayner	6,127	15.9	+3.6
Majority		1,166	3.1	−10.6
Turnout		38,555	85.3	+1.0
Liberal hold		Swing	+5.3	

General election 1964: North Devon
Party	Candidate	Votes	%	±%
Liberal	Jeremy Thorpe	19,031	50.71	+7.77
Conservative	Michael Peto	13,895	37.02	−4.94
Labour	Frank Paton	4,603	12.27	−2.83
Majority		5,136	13.69	+12.71
Turnout		37,529	84.32	−0.46
Liberal hold		Swing	+6.35	

=== Elections in the 1950s ===
General election 1959: North Devon
Party	Candidate	Votes	%	±%
Liberal	Jeremy Thorpe	15,831	42.94	+10.49
Conservative	James Lindsay	15,469	41.96	−5.17
Labour	Geoffrey W. Pitt	5,567	15.10	−5.32
Majority		362	0.98	N/A
Turnout		36,867	84.78	+3.67
Liberal gain from Conservative		Swing	+7.88	

General election 1955: North Devon
Party	Candidate	Votes	%	±%
Conservative	James Lindsay	16,784	47.13	−5.18
Liberal	Jeremy Thorpe	11,558	32.45	+13.04
Labour	Harold Heslop	7,272	20.42	−7.65
Majority		5,226	14.68	−9.56
Turnout		35,614	81.11	00.00
Conservative hold		Swing	+9.11	

General election 1951: North Devon
Party	Candidate	Votes	%	±%
Conservative	Christopher Peto	19,780	52.41	+6.08
Labour	William H. Wilkey	10,632	28.17	+4.93
Liberal	G. Alexander Halse	7,326	19.41	−11.02
Majority		9,148	24.24	+8.34
Turnout		35,614	81.11	−4.58
Conservative hold		Swing	+0.51	

General election 1950: North Devon
Party	Candidate	Votes	%	±%
Conservative	Christopher Peto	17,724	46.33	
Liberal	Guy Naylor	11,640	30.43	
Labour	W.A. Barker	8,892	23.24	
Majority		6,084	15.90	
Turnout		38,256	85.69	
Conservative win (new seat)				

=== Elections in the 1880s ===
By-election, 2 Jul 1885: North Devon (1 seat)
Party	Candidate	Votes	%	±%
Conservative	John Moore-Stevens	Unopposed		
Conservative hold				

- Caused by Northcote's appointment as First Lord of the Treasury and elevation to the peerage, becoming Earl of Iddesleigh.

General election 1880: North Devon (2 seats)
Party	Candidate	Votes	%	±%
Liberal	Thomas Dyke Acland	Unopposed		
Conservative	Stafford Northcote	Unopposed		
Registered electors		9,496		
Liberal hold				
Conservative hold				

=== Elections in the 1870s ===
By-election, 18 Mar 1874: North Devon (1 seat)
Party	Candidate	Votes	%	±%
Conservative	Stafford Northcote	Unopposed		
Conservative hold				

- Caused by Northcote's appointment as Chancellor of the Exchequer.

General election 1874: North Devon (2 seats)
Party	Candidate	Votes	%	±%
Liberal	Thomas Dyke Acland	Unopposed		
Conservative	Stafford Northcote	Unopposed		
Registered electors		9,829		
Liberal hold				
Conservative hold				

=== Elections in the 1860s ===
General election 1868: North Devon (2 seats)
Party	Candidate	Votes	%	±%
Conservative	Stafford Northcote	3,967	34.8	N/A
Liberal	Thomas Dyke Acland	3,898	34.2	N/A
Conservative	John Walrond	3,520	30.9	N/A
Turnout		7,642 (est)	82.5 (est)	N/A
Registered electors		9,260		
Majority		69	0.6	N/A
Conservative hold				
Majority		378	3.3	N/A
Liberal hold				

By-election, 18 March 1867: North Devon
Party	Candidate	Votes	%	±%
Conservative	Stafford Northcote	Unopposed		
Conservative hold				

- Caused by Northcote's appointment as Secretary of State for India

By-election, 14 July 1866: North Devon
Party	Candidate	Votes	%	±%
Conservative	Stafford Northcote	Unopposed		
Conservative hold				

- Caused by Northcote's appointment as President of the Board of Trade

By-election, 9 May 1866: North Devon
Party	Candidate	Votes	%	±%
Conservative	Stafford Northcote	Unopposed		
Conservative hold				

- Caused by Trefusis' elevation to the peerage, becoming Lord Clinton.

General election 1865: North Devon
Party	Candidate	Votes	%	±%
Liberal	Thomas Dyke Acland	Unopposed		
Conservative	Charles Trefusis	Unopposed		
Registered electors		8,746		
Liberal hold				
Conservative hold				

By-election, 1 April 1865: North Devon
Party	Candidate	Votes	%	±%
Liberal	Thomas Dyke Acland	Unopposed		
Liberal hold				

- Caused by Buller's death.

=== Elections in the 1850s ===
General election 1859: North Devon
Party	Candidate	Votes	%	±%
Liberal	James Wentworth Buller	Unopposed		
Conservative	Charles Trefusis	Unopposed		
Registered electors		8,764		
Liberal hold				
Conservative hold				

General election 1857: North Devon
Party	Candidate	Votes	%	±%
Whig	James Wentworth Buller	3,652	45.2	N/A
Conservative	Charles Trefusis	2,322	28.7	N/A
Conservative	Stafford Northcote	2,105	26.1	N/A
Majority		1,547	19.1	N/A
Turnout		5,866 (est)	80.7 (est)	N/A
Registered electors		7,264		
Whig gain from Conservative		Swing	N/A	
Conservative hold		Swing	N/A	

General election 1852: North Devon
Party	Candidate	Votes	%	±%
Conservative	Lewis William Buck	Unopposed		
Conservative	Thomas Dyke Acland	Unopposed		
Registered electors		8,064		
Conservative hold				
Conservative hold				

=== Elections in the 1840s ===
General election 1847: North Devon
Party	Candidate	Votes	%	±%
Conservative	Lewis William Buck	Unopposed		
Conservative	Thomas Dyke Acland	Unopposed		
Registered electors		8,597		
Conservative hold				
Conservative hold				

General election 1841: North Devon
Party	Candidate	Votes	%	±%
Conservative	Lewis William Buck	Unopposed		
Conservative	Thomas Dyke Acland	Unopposed		
Registered electors		8,869		
Conservative hold				
Conservative gain from Whig				

=== Elections in the 1830s ===
By-election, 18 March 1839: North Devon
Party	Candidate	Votes	%
Conservative	Lewis William Buck	3,720	53.4
Whig	James Wentworth Buller	3,240	46.6
Majority		480	6.8
Turnout		6,960	88.4
Registered electors		7,871	
Conservative gain from Whig			

- Caused by Fortescue's succession to the peerage as 2nd Earl Fortescue

General election 1837: North Devon
Party	Candidate	Votes	%
Whig	Hugh Fortescue	Unopposed	
Conservative	Thomas Dyke Acland	Unopposed	
Registered electors		7,757	
Whig hold			
Conservative gain from Whig			

General election 1835: North Devon
Party	Candidate	Votes	%
Whig	Hugh Fortescue	Unopposed	
Whig	Newton Fellowes	Unopposed	
Registered electors		6,236	
Whig hold			
Whig hold			

General election 1832: North Devon
Party	Candidate	Votes	%
Whig	Hugh Fortescue	Unopposed	
Whig	Newton Fellowes	Unopposed	
Registered electors		5,368	
Whig win (new seat)			
Whig win (new seat)			

== See also ==
- List of parliamentary constituencies in Devon

== Sources ==
- The Times House of Commons 1945. 1945.
- The Times House of Commons 1950. 1950.
- The Times House of Commons 1955. 1955.
