= 1885 North Devon by-election =

UK parliamentary by-election

The July 1885 North Devon by-election was a Ministerial by-election held on 2 July 1885, following the appointment of the incumbent Conservative MP Stafford Northcote as First Lord of the Treasury and elevation to the peerage, becoming Earl of Iddesleigh. The Conservative Party candidate John Moore-Stevens was elected unopposed.
