= Nick Harvey =

British Liberal Democrat politician

Sir Nick Harvey
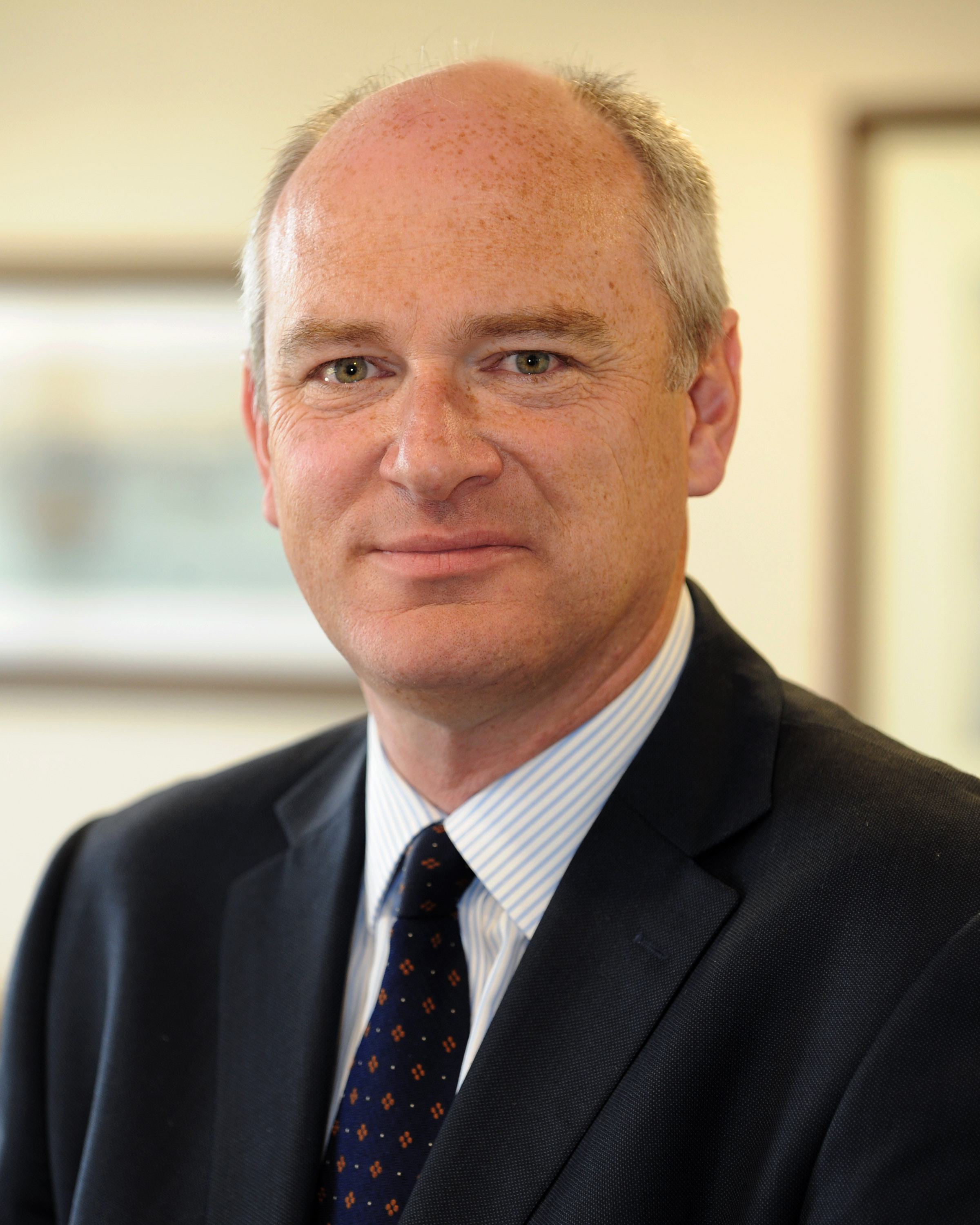
- Harvey in 2010

Chief Executive of the Liberal Democrats
- In office August 2017 – November 2019
- Leader: Vince Cable; Jo Swinson
- Preceded by: Tim Gordon
- Succeeded by: Mike Dixon

Minister of State for the Armed Forces
- In office 13 May 2010 – 4 September 2012
- Prime Minister: David Cameron
- Preceded by: Bill Rammell
- Succeeded by: Andrew Robathan

Liberal Democrat Spokesperson for Defence
- In office 7 January 2015 – 11 May 2015
- Leader: Nick Clegg
- Preceded by: Himself (2010)
- Succeeded by: Judith Jolly, Baroness Jolly
- In office 2 March 2006 – 13 May 2010
- Leader: Menzies Campbell; Vince Cable (Acting); Nick Clegg
- Preceded by: Michael Moore
- Succeeded by: Himself (2015)

Member of Parliament for North Devon
- In office 9 April 1992 – 30 March 2015
- Preceded by: Tony Speller
- Succeeded by: Peter Heaton-Jones

Personal details
- Born: 3 August 1961 (age 65) Chandler's Ford, Hampshire, England
- Party: Liberal Democrat
- Spouse: Kate Fox (m. 2003)
- Children: 2
- Education: Middlesex Polytechnic

Sir Nicholas Barton Harvey (born 3 August 1961) is a British Liberal Democrat politician. He was the member of parliament (MP) for North Devon from 1992 to 2015 and the Minister of State for the Armed Forces from 2010 to 2012.

== Early life and education ==
Harvey was born in Chandler's Ford, Hampshire, and was educated at Queen's College, an independent school in the county town of Taunton in Somerset. He then attended the Middlesex Polytechnic at Enfield where he was awarded a BA degree in business studies in 1983. He was the president of the students' union from 1981 to 1982.

== Early career ==
He joined Profil PR Ltd in 1984 as a communications and marketing executive, before being appointed by the public relations firm Dewe Rogerson (now known as Citigate Dewe Rogerson) as a marketing executive in 1986. He worked as a communications consultant from 1991 until his election to parliament.

== Parliamentary career ==
He was elected as the vice-chairman of the Union of Liberal Students for a year in 1981. He unsuccessfully contested the London Borough of Enfield seat of Enfield Southgate at the 1987 general election. He finished in second place some 18,345 votes behind the then government whip Michael Portillo. He was elected to the House of Commons for North Devon at the 1992 general election by defeating the Conservative MP, Tony Speller, who had ended the parliamentary career of former Liberal leader Jeremy Thorpe in the same seat at the 1979 general election. Harvey won the seat with a majority of just 794, but remained the MP there until 2015. He made his maiden speech on 11 May 1992.

He was made a spokesman on transport in 1992 by Paddy Ashdown, before being moved to speak on trade and industry in 1994. He became the spokesman on constitutional affairs following the 1997 general election. He became a member the front bench team under Charles Kennedy in 1999 when he became the party's health spokesperson. Following the 2001 general election, he became the Liberal Democrat spokesperson for culture, media and sport until he stood down in 2003 to spend more time with his young family. He was a member of both the home affairs select committee and the standards and privileges committee since the 2005 general election. He was the vice-chairman of the all party group on beer. Until 2009, in addition to his career as an MP, he devoted time to advising a commercial public relations agency, Harrison Cowley, for which he declared an annual income of up to £10,000.

=== Minister for the Armed Forces ===
Following the 2010 general election, as part of the Liberal Democrat – Conservative coalition, he was made Minister of State for the Armed Forces. In January 2012, he answered questions in Parliament on the historical sinking of the submarine HMS Affray. While Minister, Harvey was responsible for monitoring the progress of a report on possible replacements for the Trident nuclear submarines, part of the 2010 coalition agreement. He served as minister until September 2012.

=== Return to backbenches ===
Following the September 2012 reshuffle, he was knighted as a Knight Bachelor.

He was also a member of the public bill committee for the Defence Reform Act 2014.

He lost his seat in the General Election 2015 by 6,936 votes. He contested the seat unsuccessfully in the General Election 2017, increasing his vote by 8.6%, but falling 4,332 votes short.

== Corporate career ==
After leaving Parliament, he was chair of the trustees of the Joseph Rowntree Reform Trust and worked for Global Partners, where he was an adviser on Egypt and Jordan.

In August 2017, he was appointed interim chief executive of the Liberal Democrats, following the resignation of Tim Gordon. He was appointed as permanent Chief Executive on 28 November 2018, but stood down less than a year later.

In July 2023, Nick became the Chief Executive of European Movement UK, an independent all-party pressure group in the United Kingdom which campaigns for a close relationship with the European Union, and to ensure that European values, standards, and rights are upheld in British law post-Brexit.

== Political views ==
He was the only Liberal Democrat MP to vote against the Maastricht Treaty in 1992 and was a critic of Liberal Democratic leader Charles Kennedy, having called into question his "political direction" and "leadership skills". He returned to the front bench as defence spokesperson under Kennedy's successor, Sir Menzies Campbell. He voted against the Iraq War and called repeatedly for troops to be withdrawn under a phased timetable. He also voted against the government's decision to renew Britain's nuclear deterrent, Trident.

== Personal life ==
Harvey married Kate Harvey in May 2003 in North Devon. They have a daughter born in 2002 and a son born in 2004.

== Notes ==
Parliament of the United Kingdom
Preceded by Tony Speller	Member of Parliament for North Devon; 1992 – 2015	Succeeded by Peter Heaton-Jones
