= Norman Josiffe =

Key figure of "the Thorpe affair" (born 1940)

- Born: Norman Josiffe; 12 February 1940 (age 86); Sidcup, Kent, England
- Other names: Norman Scott; Norman Lianche-Josiffe; The Hon Norman Lianche-Josiffe
- Occupations: Dressage trainer; model
- Years active: 1961–present
- Spouse(s): Susan Myers (m. 1969; div. 1970) (m. 1975; died 1986)
- Partner: Hilary Arthur
- Children: 2

Norman Josiffe (born 12 February 1940), also known in the media as Norman Scott, is an English former dressage trainer and model who was a key figure in the Thorpe affair, a major British political scandal of the 1970s. The scandal revolved around the alleged plot by his ex-boyfriend, Liberal Party leader Jeremy Thorpe, to murder Scott after Scott threatened to reveal their sexual relationship to the media.

== Early life ==
Josiffe was born in Sidcup, Kent, to Ena Dorothy Josiffe (née Lynch, formerly Merritt, 1907–1985), and Albert Norman Josiffe (1908–1983), her second husband, who abandoned his wife and child soon after Norman's birth. Educated at Bexleyheath, he later changed his surname to "Lianche-Josiffe" by amending his mother's maiden name, Lynch, and for a time called himself "the Hon Norman Lianche-Josiffe".

== Relationship with Thorpe ==
In 1961, Josiffe was working as a groom for Brecht Van de Vater (born Norman Vivian Vater), at Kingham Stables in Chipping Norton, Oxfordshire, when he met Jeremy Thorpe MP, a friend of Vater. After Josiffe left his job at Vater's stables, he suffered from mental illness and spent some time in a psychiatric hospital. On 8 November 1961, a week after discharging himself from the Ashurst clinic in Oxford, he went to the House of Commons in London to see Thorpe. He was penniless and homeless; having left Vater's employment without his National Insurance card, he now also believed that he needed it to obtain regular work and access to social and unemployment benefits. Thorpe promised he would help. This was when the relationship between the two men was alleged to have started. Thorpe gave him the nickname "Bunnies" but always denied any physical element in the relationship. When Thorpe took him to stay with his mother, Ursula Thorpe, Josiffe introduced himself as "Peter Johnson". Josiffe's claims of mistreatment by Thorpe led to Josiffe's being reported to the police, in the course of which the relationship was revealed.

The relationship allegedly led indirectly to the 1975 attempted murder of Josiffe, who was by then calling himself Norman Scott. His attacker, Andrew Newton, was arrested after shooting dead Josiffe's dog, Rinka, but it was not until later that Josiffe's accusations against Thorpe became public.

== Personal life ==
On 13 May 1969, after his relationship with Thorpe, Josiffe (now calling himself Scott) married Angela Mary Susan Myers (1945–1986), sister-in-law of the English comedy actor Terry-Thomas. Susan Scott was already two months pregnant at the time of their marriage and her family was not supportive of the marriage – her mother and sister refused to attend the ceremony and Captain Myers (Josiffe's new father-in-law) denounced Scott as homosexual at the wedding reception, stating that the marriage "was doomed". The couple had a son – Diggory Benjamin W. Scott, who was born, later in 1969, in Spilsby, Lincolnshire. Susan Scott left Scott in 1970, subsequently divorced him, remarried in 1975, and died in 1986.

In 1971, while living in Tal-y-Bont in North Wales, where he found casual work, Scott met widow Gwen Parry-Jones, whose late husband had been a soldier in the Welsh Guards. She was a former local village postmistress and was an acquaintance of Liberal MP Emlyn Hooson. Parry-Jones arranged a meeting with Hooson, who interviewed Scott (with Liberal MP David Steel) about his relationship with Thorpe and started his own investigations, but could not substantiate the allegations. After breaking-up with Scott, Parry-Jones became very depressed. In 1972, her aunt failed to get any response at her home for several weeks and the police discovered that she had died, which the coroner subsequently recorded as alcohol poisoning.

In 1975, he began a relationship with a woman named Hilary Arthur, with whom, in May 1976, he had a daughter, Bryony.

After 1979, Scott retreated into obscurity. At the time of Thorpe's death in 2014, he was living in Ireland, but by the time of the 2018 dramatisation of his relationship with Thorpe, he had returned to the UK and was living again in Devon. In 2022 he published a memoir, An Accidental Icon, which was received generally favourably, though reviewers expressed scepticism over some of his claims.

== In popular culture ==
Scott discussed the scandal, in an interview broadcast in 2002.

In 2016, A Very English Scandal, by John Preston about the Thorpe scandal and subsequent trial was published.

In 2018, a BBC miniseries also called A Very English Scandal was aired in which Scott was portrayed by Ben Whishaw. Scott remarked to The Irish News: "I'm portrayed as this poor, mincing, little gay person ... I also come across as a weakling and I've never been a weakling."

The mini-series' director, Stephen Frears, has described Scott as "erratic", stating that his reactions to both book and television series are inconsistent. Andrew Rawnsley, reviewing Thorpe's biography by Michael Bloch, described Josiffe as a "liar" and a "fantasist".
