= Tony Speller =

British politician (1929-2013)

Member of Parliament for North Devon
- In office 3 May 1979 – 16 March 1992
- Preceded by: Jeremy Thorpe
- Succeeded by: Nick Harvey

Personal details
- Born: Antony Kirby Speller; 12 June 1929 Exeter, England
- Died: 15 February 2013 (aged 83)
- Party: Conservative
- Spouse(s): Margaret Lloyd-Jones (m. 1950; div. 1958) Maureen McLellan (m. 1960)
- Children: 5
- Education: University of London; Exeter University

Antony Kirby Speller (12 June 1929 – 15 February 2013) was a British Conservative politician. Speller was born in Exeter on 12 June 1929, the son of Captain John Speller, director of posts and telegraphs for India, who later returned to take over the city's Bystock Hotel. He was educated at Exeter School, before graduating in Economics from the University of London and in Social Studies from Exeter University.

On his second attempt, in the 1979 general election, he defeated former Liberal leader Jeremy Thorpe to become MP for North Devon, which effectively ended Thorpe's political career. Speller held the seat until 1992 when he lost to the Liberal Democrat Nick Harvey.

Speller married first, in 1950, Margaret Lloyd-Jones; they had two sons and a daughter before divorcing in 1958. In 1960, he married Maureen McLellan, with whom he had a son and a daughter.

== Sources ==
- Times Guide to the House of Commons, 1992

Parliament of the United Kingdom
Preceded by Jeremy Thorpe	Member of Parliament for North Devon; 1979 – 1992	Succeeded by Nick Harvey
