= Radical Reform Group =

The Radical Reform Group was a pressure group inside the Liberal Party, set up in 1952 to campaign for social liberal and Keynesian economic approaches. According to Andrew Gamble, the Radical Reform Group believed that 'the task of Liberals was not to retreat from Social Liberalism but to propose ways in which the institutions and policies of the Welfare State and the managed economy could be improved and strengthened.'

== Reasons for formation ==
The founding members were concerned that, in the years after the Second World War, under the leadership of Clement Davies, the party was falling unduly under the sway of classical, free-market liberals and was drifting to the right. Under the influence of economic Liberals such as Oliver Smedley and Arthur Seldon who helped establish the Institute of Economic Affairs, the think tank which was to later become an engine of Thatcherism, the Liberal ship was coming loose from the New Liberal anchors it had adopted from the 1890s and reinforced in the 1920s with the Lloyd George, Keynes and Beveridge inspired coloured books. In 1948 the Liberal Party Assembly called for a drastic reduction in government expenditure and for a committee to be set up to recommend severe cuts. The drift to the right so alarmed many left wing Liberals that many chose to abandon the party and join Labour, chief among them being the MPs or former MPs Lady Megan Lloyd George, Dingle Foot, Tom Horabin and Edgar Granville.

== Founding fathers ==
The two main protagonists in the birth of the Radical Reform Group were Desmond Banks (later Lord Banks of Kenton) and Peter Grafton who was Liberal candidate for Bromley in 1950 general election. Banks also gave as a justification for the Radical Reform Group the need to popularise and strengthen the Liberal Party as a political alternative for electors disillusioned with the main parties so as to avoid the growth of extremist groups. 'If there were no Liberal Party' he declared in a speech at Ruan Minor in Cornwall in March 1956, 'we might well be witnessing today the growth of some dangerous movement akin to that of M.Poujade in France.

== Leaving the Liberal Party ==
In 1954, the Group decided to disaffiliate from the Liberal Party to try to attract members from the social democratic wing of the Labour Party and from moderate Conservatives under the slogan 'social reform without socialism'. While most individual members remained card-carrying Liberals however, one former chairman of the Group, Eric Farquhar Allison decided to join the Labour Party and one of its vice-presidents, the former MP for Dundee, Dingle Foot, openly supported Labour candidates in seats not contested by Liberals at the 1955 general election. This was an early attempt to provide a radical, progressive, non-socialist, cross-party force in British politics similar to the re-alignment of the left that Liberal leader Jo Grimond (who was president of the Radical Reform Group in the late 1950s) was to call for.

== Rejoining the Liberal Party ==
This strategy was not successful however and the Group voted narrowly to move back into the Liberal Party in 1955. The move was welcomed by the Liberal leaning newspaper the News Chronicle in a leader entitled Left or Limbo.

== Influence ==
The Group was at the peak of its influence in the mid-1950s. The Economist reported on 1 May 1954 that the Radical Reform Group had gathered strength from the Liberal revival in the universities. In addition to Jo Grimond, the Radical Reform Group was endorsed by many top people in the party amongst them Frank Owen the former MP for Hereford who contested a by-election there in February 1956, pushing Labour into third place and Jeremy Thorpe who went on to succeed Grimond as party leader. In 1955, The Western Morning News reported that Thorpe was proclaiming the gospel of his Radical Reform Group with the energetic support of university students from Exeter and Bristol.

The Group continued into the 1960s and although it was never formally wound up it became increasingly a debating society as the mainstream of the party endorsed Grimond's political strategy and the economic liberals gradually lost influence or left the party.

== Bibliography ==
- Vernon Bogdanor, Liberal Party Politics, Ch.3 (OUP, 1983)
- Richard Cocket, Thinking the Unthinkable: Think-Tanks and the Economic Counter-Revolution, 1931-1983 (Fontana, 1995).
- Graham Lippiatt, entry on Radical Reform Group in Brack & Randall (eds.): Dictionary of Liberal Thought (Politico's, 2007)
- Graham Lippiatt, entry on Desmond Banks in Brack et al. (eds.)Dictionary of Liberal Biography (Politico's, 1998)
- Graham Lippiatt, The Radical Reform Group in Journal of Liberal History, Issue 67, Summer 2010
- Alan Watkins, The Liberal Dilemma, Ch.4, (MacGibbon & Key, 1966

== Works by the Radical Reform Group ==
- Radical Approach: A Statement of Aims by the Radical Reform Group (1953)
- Radical Aims: Social Reform without Socialism (undated, probably 1954)
- Radical Challenge (1960)
