= 1867 North Devon by-election =

UK parliamentary by-election

The 1867 North Devon by-election was a Ministerial by-election held on 18 March 1867, after the seat was vacated, upon the appointment of the incumbent Conservative MP Stafford Northcote, as Secretary of State for India. Northcote was re-elected unopposed, by established convention.
