= July 1866 North Devon by-election =

UK parliamentary by-election

The July 1866 North Devon by-election was a Ministerial by-election held on 14 July 1866, after the seat was vacated, upon the appointment of the incumbent Conservative MP Stafford Northcote, as President of the Board of Trade. Northcote was re-elected unopposed, by established convention.
