= Christopher Peto =

British army officer and politician (1897–1980)

Brigadier Sir Christopher Peto Bt DSO DL

Member of Parliament for North Devon
- In office 23 February 1950 – 6 May 1955
- Preceded by: New constituency
- Succeeded by: James Lindsay

Member of Parliament for Barnstaple
- In office 5 July 1945 – 3 February 1950
- Preceded by: Sir Richard Acland
- Succeeded by: Constituency abolished

Personal details
- Born: 19 February 1897 Chertsey, Surrey
- Died: 19 May 1980 (aged 83) Basingstoke, Hampshire
- Party: Conservative

Military service
- Allegiance: United Kingdom
- Branch/service: British Army
- Years of service: 1915–1946
- Rank: Brigadier
- Commands: 137th Armoured Brigade (1942–1943); 29th Armoured Brigade (1940–1942); 9th Queen's Royal Lancers (1938–1940)
- Battles/wars: First World War; Second World War
- Awards: Distinguished Service Order; Mentioned in Despatches (3); Knight of the Legion of Honour (France); Croix de Guerre (France); Commander of the Order of Leopold (Belgium); Croix de Guerre (Belgium); Commander of the Order of the White Lion (Czechoslovakia); War Cross (Czechoslovakia); Commander of the Order of Adolphe of Nassau (Luxembourg); War Cross (Luxembourg); Commander's Cross of the Order of Polonia Restituta (Poland)

Brigadier Sir Christopher Henry Maxwell Peto, 3rd Baronet, DSO, DL (19 February 1897 – 19 May 1980) was a senior officer in the British Army during the Second World War and a post-war Conservative Party politician.

== Early life ==
Peto was born in Chertsey, Surrey, on 19 February 1897, the son of Sir Basil Peto, 1st Baronet and Mary Matilda Annie (née Baird).

== Military service ==
Peto graduated from the Royal Military College, Sandhurst and was commissioned a second lieutenant in the 9th Queen's Royal Lancers on 11 August 1915. He served in both the First World War and Second World War, attaining the rank of brigadier.

Peto took command of the 9th Queen's Royal Lancers in October 1938, being one of the few officers in the regiment to have seen action in the First World War. He was tasked with carrying on the mechanised training of the regiment in the buildup to the war, to mobilise it when war came and to take it to France in May 1940.

The regimental history of the Lancers has this description of him in its foreword:

His was the responsibility of showing all ranks how to behave under fire, and so much depends upon the leadership the first time men go into battle. His calm and fearless example was an inspiration to all, and laid the foundation of the enthusiasm and steadiness which the regiment so consistently displayed throughout the war. He commanded with conspicuous ability in the fantastic operations south of the Somme until a severe wound obliged him to be evacuated. He earned the D.S.O. for his services in France in 1940, though this was not known until Major-General Victor Fortune, Commander of the 51st Highland Division, was able to make his recommendations on his return from captivity in Germany. These he backed up by a personal visit to the War Office. Those who did not take part can have little idea of a commanding officer's difficulties during those two years. Many were caused by failure in higher places to foresee more accurately the type of equipment which would be required, to provide it in time, and to settle with less vacillation the organisation of the troops who would use it. Luckily for the regiment, Chris Peto had, and has, an inexhaustible fund of humour and an irrepressible spirit. These, he would be the first to admit, have sometimes got him into trouble, but they were invaluable assets through those years of exasperating trial. He did not come back after his recovery, but was promoted to the command of armoured brigade. The Regiment owes him a debt.

When the regiment deployed to France it was not well equipped and this was partly the reason for Peto becoming wounded:

Major MacDonell seeing the head and face of a German popping out of the ground periodically about three hundred yards from the Regimental Headquarters, suggested an investigation. Lieutenant-Colonel Peto agreed and led the reconnaissance accompanied by Major MacDonell's tank and two scout cars. They opened fire on twelve slit trenches full of enemy infantry. After ten minutes the Germans crawled out and surrendered. The "bag" was one officer and forty-three other ranks. We had found it impossible to depress the guns on our tanks sufficiently to bear, and Lt-Col Peto, firing from his turret with his pistol, was badly wounded in the right hand. He carried on until the Germans surrendered, and was then evacuated.

As well as being awarded the Distinguished Service Order, Peto also received:

- 3 Mentioned in Despatches
- French Knight of the Legion of Honour
- French Croix de Guerre with palm
- Belgian Commander of the Order of Leopold
- Belgian Croix de Guerre with palm
- Czech Commander of the Order of the White Lion
- Czech War Cross
- Luxembourg Commander of the Order of Adolphe of Nassau
- Luxembourg War Cross
- Polish Commander's Cross of the Order of Polonia Restituta

== Political career ==
At the 1945 general election, Peto was elected as the Member of Parliament for Barnstaple. For the 1950 general election, the Barnstaple constituency was abolished, and Peto was returned instead for the newly recreated Devon North constituency, where he served until the 1955 general election.

In 1966, Peto was appointed the High Sheriff of Wiltshire for the year. He inherited the baronetcy created for his father in 1977, upon the death of his elder brother.

Peto died at Basingstoke, Hampshire, aged 83 in 1980. The title was inherited by his son, Michael, who became the 4th Baronet. Michael had three sons and the elder of these, Henry, is the 5th and current Baronet of this creation. The other Peto baronetcy, created for Peto's grandfather, is also still extant in the senior branch of the family.

Parliament of the United Kingdom
Preceded by Sir Richard Acland	Member of Parliament for Barnstaple; 1945–1950	Constituency abolished
New constituency	Member of Parliament for North Devon; 1950–1955	Succeeded by James Lindsay
Baronetage of the United Kingdom
Preceded by James Peto	Baronet (of Barnstaple); 1971–1980	Succeeded by Michael Peto
