= Peter Grafton =

Peter Witheridge Grafton CBE (19 May 1916 – 20 May 2012), was a British Liberal Party politician and surveyor.

== Background ==
He was born one of twin brothers, sons of James Hawkins Grafton and Ethel Marion Brannan. He was educated at Westminster City School, Sutton Valence School and the College of Estate Management. In 1939 he married Joan Bleackley who died in 1969. They had two daughters (and one son and one daughter, deceased). In 1971 he married Margaret Ruth Ward. They had two sons.

== Early career ==
He served as a captain in the war of 1939–45 in the Queen's Westminster Rifles, the Dorsetshire Regiment and the Royal Engineers in the UK and the Far East. He served in India, Ceylon, and Java and went with the expeditionary force to the Cocos Islands.

== Political career ==
He was Liberal candidate for the Bromley division of Kent at the 1950 General Election. He broke his leg three days before the election was called and conducted his campaign on crutches.

General Election 1950: Bromley Electorate 47,369
Party	Candidate	Votes	%	±%
Conservative	Rt Hon. Maurice Harold Macmillan	23,042	57.26	
Labour	Mrs. J. R. Elliott	12,354	30.70	
Liberal	Peter Witheridge Grafton	4,847	12.04	
Majority		10,688	26.56	
Turnout			84.96	
Conservative hold		Swing		

He did not stand for parliament again. In 1953, together with Desmond Banks who had been Liberal parliamentary candidate in Harrow East in 1950, Grafton co-founded the Radical Reform Group, a social liberal pressure group within the Liberal Party to prevent what many saw as a rightward drift by the party, and its potential capture by the economic liberals. The Group campaigned under the slogan 'social reform without socialism'. Grafton was the group's Honorary Secretary.

== Professional career ==
He was a senior partner, at G. D. Walford & Partners, Chartered Quantity Surveyors, 1978–82 having been a Partner 1949–78.

In 1972 he was appointed a CBE.
