= Peter Heaton-Jones =

British politician and journalist

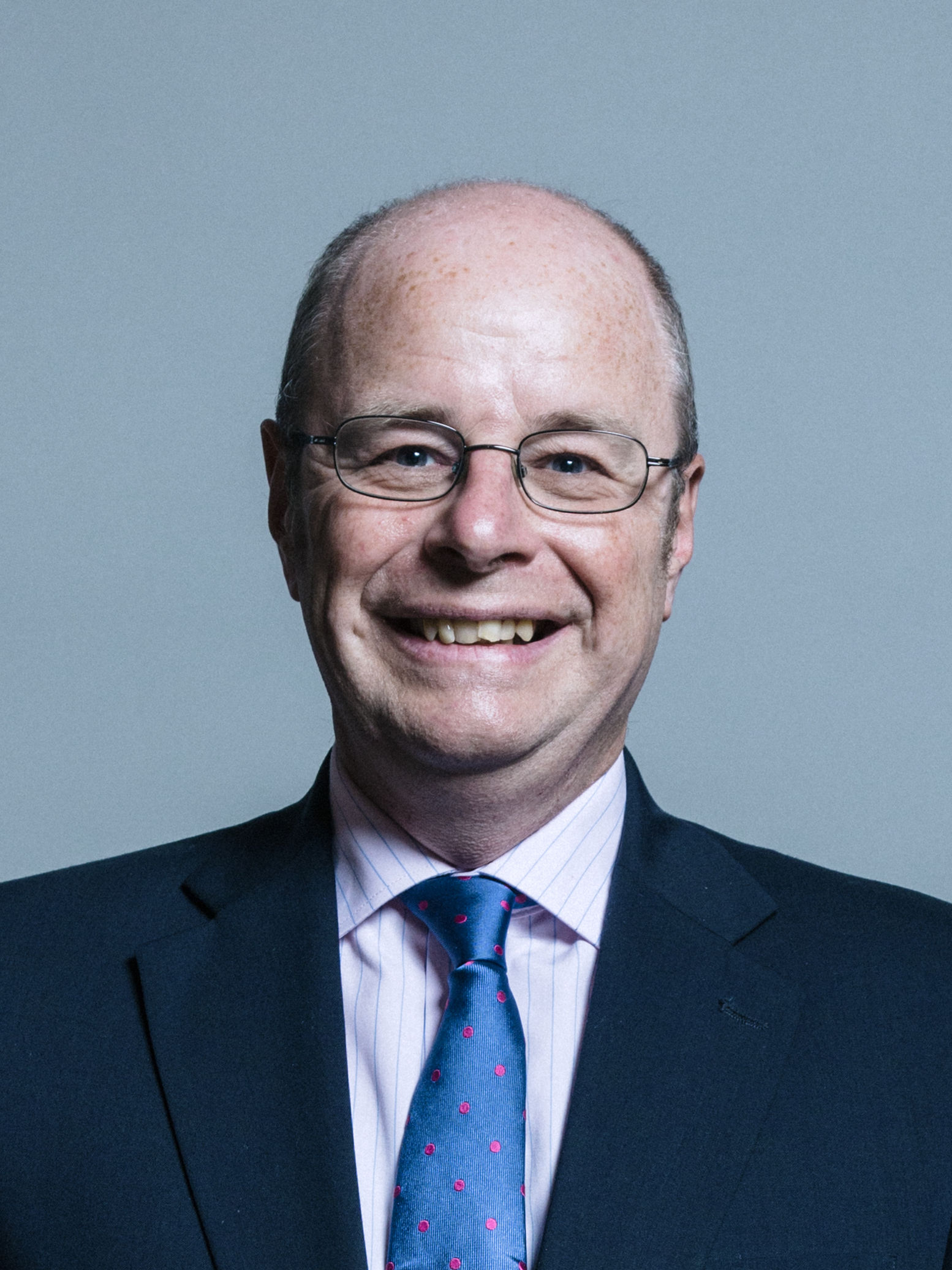

Member of Parliament for North Devon
- In office 7 May 2015 – 6 November 2019
- Preceded by: Nick Harvey
- Succeeded by: Selaine Saxby

Personal details
- Born: 1963 (age 62–63) Kingston upon Thames, London, England
- Party: Conservative
- Education: University of London
- Website: Official website

Peter Heaton-Jones (born 1963) is a British Conservative Party politician, journalist and broadcaster. He served as Member of Parliament for North Devon between 2015 and 2019.

He previously held senior positions in the media in both the UK and Australia. He edited and presented news programming on BBC national and local radio stations in the UK, and was formerly head of marketing for ABC radio networks in Australia.

== Media career ==
Heaton-Jones was born in 1963 in Kingston upon Thames. He began his broadcasting career after graduating from the University of London. He worked initially in commercial radio before joining the BBC in 1986, becoming a reporter, producer and news presenter at BBC Essex and anchoring the Breakfast and Drivetime programmes. He joined the national news and current affairs network BBC Radio 5 Live when it opened in 1994, becoming a programme editor and presenting Morning Reports and Up All Night.

In 1997, Heaton-Jones moved to Australia to join the Australian Broadcasting Corporation in Sydney. He became head of marketing for radio stations ABC NewsRadio, Radio National and ABC Classic FM, but left after three years as a result of the reorganisation instigated by controversial managing director Jonathan Shier.

He returned to the UK in 2000 and joined BBC Radio Wiltshire, gaining a high profile in the region as presenter of the Breakfast Show and Morning Show from 2000 to 2006. He was also a newspaper columnist for the Swindon Advertiser. He left full-time broadcasting in August 2006, apart from a guest role presenting the launch programme and first week of Breakfast shows at community radio station Swindon 105.5 in March 2008.

Heaton-Jones specialised as a political journalist, including the presentation of BBC election coverage nationally and locally from 1986 onwards. In 2006 he conducted a face-to-face interview with then-British Prime Minister Tony Blair.

== Early political career ==
In 2006 Heaton-Jones returned to Australia and worked on the election campaign of Rob Stokes, the Liberal Party candidate in the New South Wales Electoral district of Pittwater. The campaign succeeded, with Stokes regaining the seat for the Liberals from incumbent Independent Member of Parliament Alex McTaggart. After the election, Heaton-Jones was appointed Stokes' policy advisor and press secretary in the New South Wales Parliament.

In 2007 he returned to live in the UK. He unsuccessfully stood as the Conservative Party candidate in the marginal Western ward of Swindon Borough Council at the 2008 local elections. Following this, Heaton-Jones was appointed the Party's media and campaigns director. In 2009 he became a Councillor on Haydon Wick Parish Council and a Governor at Isambard Community School, both in North Swindon.

In 2010, he served as agent and campaign director for the Conservative candidates in the North Swindon and South Swindon parliamentary constituencies, both of which were gained from the Labour Party at the general election on 6 May. On the same day he was elected to Swindon Borough Council as councillor for the Abbey Meads ward. Following the election, he was appointed Senior Parliamentary Assistant to MPs Robert Buckland and Justin Tomlinson. He was also appointed to a number of committees on Swindon Borough Council, including the Planning and Scrutiny committees. In May 2012, Heaton-Jones was re-elected to Swindon Borough Council for the new St Andrews ward. He was appointed Chair of the Economic Scrutiny Committee and Vice-Chair of Scrutiny, and also served on the Licensing Committee.

== Member of Parliament ==
In February 2013, Heaton-Jones was selected as the Conservative Prospective Parliamentary Candidate for North Devon.

He went on to win the seat in May 2015, defeating the incumbent Liberal Democrat MP Nick Harvey. He was re-elected at the 2017 general election, with an increased share of the vote.

In July 2016 he was appointed Parliamentary Private Secretary to the ministerial team at the Department for Work and Pensions. In June 2017 he became Parliamentary Private Secretary to the new Secretary of State at the department, David Gauke. In January 2018, when Gauke was appointed Lord Chancellor, Heaton-Jones moved with him to the Ministry of Justice. He served as his Parliamentary Private Secretary until Gauke resigned in July 2019.

Heaton-Jones was opposed to Brexit prior to the 2016 referendum.

In the House of Commons he sat on the Environmental Audit Committee between 2015–2017. He also sat on numerous Delegated Legislation Committees, including the Committee Stage of the Data Protection Act 2018.

== Post-Parliament ==
In October 2019 Heaton-Jones announced he would stand down from Parliament and not contest the forthcoming general election, in December 2019. Since leaving the House of Commons he has worked as a political consultant, a commentator and analyst on broadcast media, and a feature writer. In November 2020 he was appointed President of North Devon Conservative Association. He is also Vice-President of the Tarka Rail Association.

In 2022 he unsuccessfully sought election to Southwark Council.

== Personal life ==
Heaton-Jones lives in London.

Parliament of the United Kingdom
| Preceded by Nick Harvey | Member of Parliament for North Devon; 2015–2019 | Succeeded by Selaine Saxby |
