= James Lindsay (North Devon MP) =

British politician (1906–1997)

The Honourable James Lindsay

Member of Parliament for North Devon
- In office 26 May 1955 – 18 September 1959
- Preceded by: Christopher Peto
- Succeeded by: Jeremy Thorpe

Personal details
- Born: 16 December 1906
- Died: 27 August 1997 (aged 90)
- Party: Conservative
- Spouse: Bronwen Scott-Ellis (m. 1933)
- Children: 3 sons, 1 daughter
- Education: Magdalen College, Oxford
- Military career
- Allegiance: United Kingdom
- Branch: British Army
- Rank: Major
- Unit: King's Royal Rifle Corps
- Conflicts: World War II

James Louis Lindsay (16 December 1906 – 27 August 1997) was a British Conservative Party politician.

== Background and education ==
Lindsay was the younger son of David Lindsay, 27th Earl of Crawford, and Constance Lilian, daughter of Sir Henry Pelly, 3rd Baronet. David Lindsay, 28th Earl of Crawford, was his elder brother. He was educated at Eton and Magdalen College, Oxford.

== Political career ==
Lindsay fought in the Second World War as a Major in the King's Royal Rifle Corps. At the 1955 general election he was elected as Member of Parliament (MP) for North Devon, succeeding Christopher Peto. He served for one term until the 1959 election, when he lost his seat by only 362 votes to the Liberal candidate Jeremy Thorpe, who went on to become his party's leader.

== Family ==
James Lindsay came from a political family and was elected to Parliament in the same election as his nephew Lord Balniel (who represented Hertford, also as a Conservative). He married the Hon Bronwen Mary Scott-Ellis, daughter of Thomas Scott-Ellis, 8th Baron Howard de Walden, in 1933. They had three sons and one daughter:

- Hugh John Alexander Lindsay (born 30 July 1934)
- Colonel Alexander Thomas Lindsay (18 December 1936 – 2023)
- Lt Col Stephen James Lindsay (born 2 March 1940)
- Julia Margaret Lindsay (born 24 September 1941)

James Lindsay died in August 1997, aged 90.

Parliament of the United Kingdom
Preceded by Christopher Peto	Member of Parliament for North Devon; 1955 – 1959	Succeeded by Jeremy Thorpe
