= Selaine Saxby =

British Conservative politician

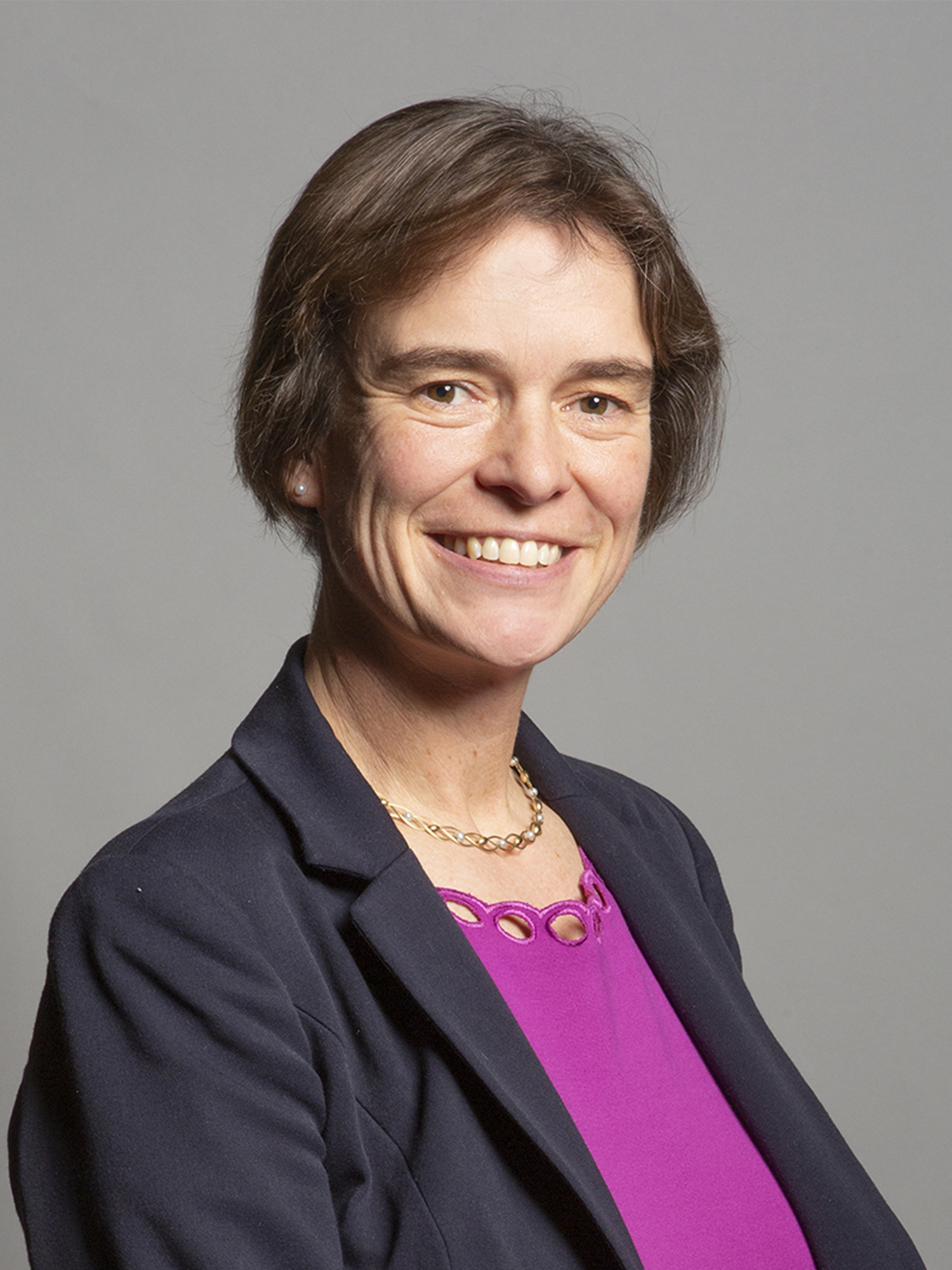

Member of Parliament for North Devon
- In office 12 December 2019 – 30 May 2024
- Preceded by: Peter Heaton-Jones
- Succeeded by: Ian Roome

Personal details
- Born: Selaine Rachel Saxby; 25 November 1970 (age 55) Coventry, England
- Party: Conservative
- Education: Magdalene College, Cambridge
- Website: selainesaxby.org.uk

Selaine Rachel Saxby (/sɪˈleɪn ˈsæksbi/ sil-AYN SAKS-bee; born 25 November 1970) is a British former Conservative Party politician who was the Member of Parliament (MP) for North Devon from 2019 to 2024. She was also a councillor on North Devon Council. After losing her seat at the 2024 general election, she retrained as a financial adviser and joined Quilter plc in 2026.

== Early life and career ==
Selaine Saxby was born on 25 November 1970 in Coventry to Kenneth and Pamela Saxby. Her father is a former headteacher.

She attended Eastbourne Sixth Form College, before studying mathematics and management at Magdalene College, Cambridge, where she gained a BA first class honours degree in maths and management studies in 1992.

She founded the independent sports bra retailer Lessbounce Ltd. in 2000, and ran the business until 2016, when it went into liquidation. During this period, she was one of the signatories to a letter of support from small business owners endorsing the Conservatives at the 2015 general election.

Saxby also founded Pink Aerobics, which organised aerobics events to raise money for breast cancer charities; it raised over £500,000. She was the chief of staff for Bath MP Ben Howlett between 2015 and 2017. From 2017 to 2018, she was a business support consultant.

In May 2019, Saxby was elected to represent Instow ward on North Devon Council.

== Parliamentary career ==
Saxby stood as the Conservative Party candidate in Llanelli at the 2015 general election, coming fourth with 14.3% of the vote behind the incumbent Labour MP Nia Griffith, the Plaid Cymru candidate, and the UKIP.

In November 2019, Saxby was selected as the Conservative candidate for North Devon. At the 2019 general election, she was elected to parliament with 56.5% of the vote and a majority of 14,813.

She was a member of the Work and Pensions Select Committee from March 2020 till July 2024.

In October 2020, following a vote in parliament against a Labour Party Opposition Day Motion to extend free school meals over holidays, Saxby was criticised for stating in a Facebook post that she hoped if local businesses were able to offer free food, then they would not be seeking further government help. She later deleted her Facebook post, stating her comments had been taken "out of context". She said in a statement that she regretted any offence that "may have been caused", and also criticised "a small but hostile element" on social media who she said had been "aggressive and personally abusive" towards her and her staff.

On 13 June 2022, Saxby was appointed Parliamentary Private Secretary to Simon Clarke, the chief secretary to the Treasury. She resigned from the role on 6 July 2022, in connection with the resignations of Rishi Sunak and Sajid Javid over Prime Minister Boris Johnson's handling of the Chris Pincher scandal. In the October 2022 Conservative Party leadership election, Saxby supported Rishi Sunak.

In February 2023, Saxby was re-selected as the Conservative candidate for North Devon at the 2024 general election. While campaigning in May 2024, she was bitten on the leg by a dog when door-knocking. Saxby lost her seat in the general election to the Liberal Democrats candidate Ian Roome.

== Post-parliamentary career ==
After losing her seat at the 2024 general election, Saxby was appointed as Director of the Chulmleigh Academy Trust, as Natural Capital Marketplace Manager at North Devon Biosphere Enterprises and as a policy consultant for Invicta Public Affairs Ltd. She subsequently retrained as a financial adviser and joined Quilter plc in 2026.

Parliament of the United Kingdom
Preceded by Peter Heaton-Jones	Member of Parliament for North Devon; 2019–2024	Succeeded by Ian Roome
