= 1874 North Devon by-election =

UK parliamentary by-election

The 1874 North Devon by-election was a Ministerial by-election held on 18 Mar 1874, after the seat was vacated, upon the appointment of the incumbent Conservative MP Stafford Northcote, as Chancellor of the Exchequer. Northcote was re-elected unopposed, by established convention.
