= Desmond Banks, Baron Banks =

British Liberal Party politician

The Right Honourable The Lord Banks

Chairman of the Liberal Party
- In office 1969–1970
- Leader: Jeremy Thorpe
- Preceded by: Michael Eden
- Succeeded by: Richard Wainwright

President of the Liberal Party
- In office 1968–1969
- Leader: Jeremy Thorpe
- Preceded by: Donald Wade
- Succeeded by: Timothy Beaumont

Personal details
- Born: Desmond Anderson Harvie Banks; 23 October 1918 Ascot, Berkshire, England
- Died: 15 June 1997 (aged 78)
- Party: Liberal
- Occupation: Politician

Desmond Anderson Harvie Banks, Baron Banks, CBE (23 October 1918 – 15 June 1997) was a British Liberal Party politician.

Banks was born in Ascot, Berkshire. He was educated at prep school in Harrow and University College School in Hampstead. During the Second World War he served as an officer in the Royal Artillery. In 1948 he married Barbara Wells who in 1987 was awarded the OBE for services to the Women's Liberal Federation. They had two sons, Alistair Richard Harvie Banks (b. 1950) and Graham Thornton Harvie Banks (b. 2 July 1953), both of whom also attended University College School. Banks was a life insurance broker and pensions consultant.

He was Chairman of the Liberal Party Executive from 1961 to 1963 and from 1969 to 1970, and President of the Liberal Party from 1968 to 1969. He was appointed a Commander of the Order of the British Empire (CBE) for political service in the 1972 New Year Honours. He was created a life peer on 7 January 1975 as Baron Banks, of Kenton in Greater London. In the House of Lords he was Liberal Deputy Chief Whip from 1977 to 1983.

Banks had joined the Liberals while at school. He joined the staff at Liberal Party HQ in 1949 and was at one time editor of the party newspaper Liberal News. He first stood as a parliamentary candidate in the 1950 election in Harrow East, then in St Ives in 1955 election and Hertfordshire South West in the 1959 election. He was sometime speechwriter for Jo Grimond and a frequent contributor to Liberal News as well as author of many pamphlets and policy papers.

In 1952, together with Peter Grafton who had been Liberal parliamentary candidate in Bromley in 1950 in opposition to Harold Macmillan, Banks co-founded the Radical Reform Group, a social liberal pressure group within the Liberal Party to prevent what many saw as a rightward drift by the party, and its potential capture by the economic liberals. The Group campaigned under the slogan 'social reform without socialism'.

Banks was a strong pro-European, a founder member and one time chairman of the Liberal European Action Group and was President of the British Council of the European Movement from 1986 to 1994.

== Bibliography ==
- Vernon Bogdanor, Liberal Party Politics, Oxford University Press, 1983
- Graham Lippiatt, entry on Banks in Dictionary of Liberal Biography, Brack et al. (eds.): Politico's, 1998
- Garry Tregidga, The Liberal Party in South West England since 1918, University of Exeter Press, 2000
- Donald Wade & Desmond Banks, The Political Insight of Elliott Dodds, Liberal Publications Dept., 1977
- Alan Watkins, The Liberal Dilemma, MacGibbon & Key, 1966

Party political offices
Preceded by Leonard Behrens	Chairman of the Liberal Party Executive; 1961–1963	Succeeded by Basil Wigoder
Preceded by Donald Wade	President of the Liberal Party; 1968–1969	Succeeded by Timothy Beaumont
Preceded by Michael Eden (Chairman of the Party); John Arnold Baker (Chairman of the Executive)	Chairman of the Liberal Party; 1969–1970	Succeeded by Richard Wainwright
