= John Moore-Stevens (MP) =

John Curzon Moore-Stevens (1818–1903), JP, DL, MP for North Devon, High Sheriff of Devon in 1870.

Moore-Stevens was the son and heir of Thomas Moore-Stevens (1782–1832). He had been brought up in the expectation of becoming the heir of John Rolle, 1st Baron Rolle (1750–1842), of Stevenstone, who died childless and was his great-grandmother's nephew. However, Lord Rolle instead left his fortune to Hon. Mark Trefusis, who changed his name to Mark Rolle (d. 1907), the nephew of his second wife Louisa Trefusis, a daughter of Baron Clinton. He married in 1850 Elizabeth Anne Johnson, daughter of Rev. Peter Johnson.

Moore-Stevens rebuilt Winscott in 1865, immediately following his inheritance. He served as a JP on the Quarter Sessions Court of Devon, and Winscott House was built with its own "Magistrate's Room" with a separate entrance. He was especially reactionary and old-fashioned and at the Mid-Summer sessions of 1882 had declared his object was "to get rid of traction-engines altogether". On the abolition of the Quarter-Sessions in 1889 he was the only former JP to have been defeated by a non-magistrate in the elections for councillors to the new replacement governing body of the Devon County Council.
