= Michael Bloch =

British author and historian (born 1953)

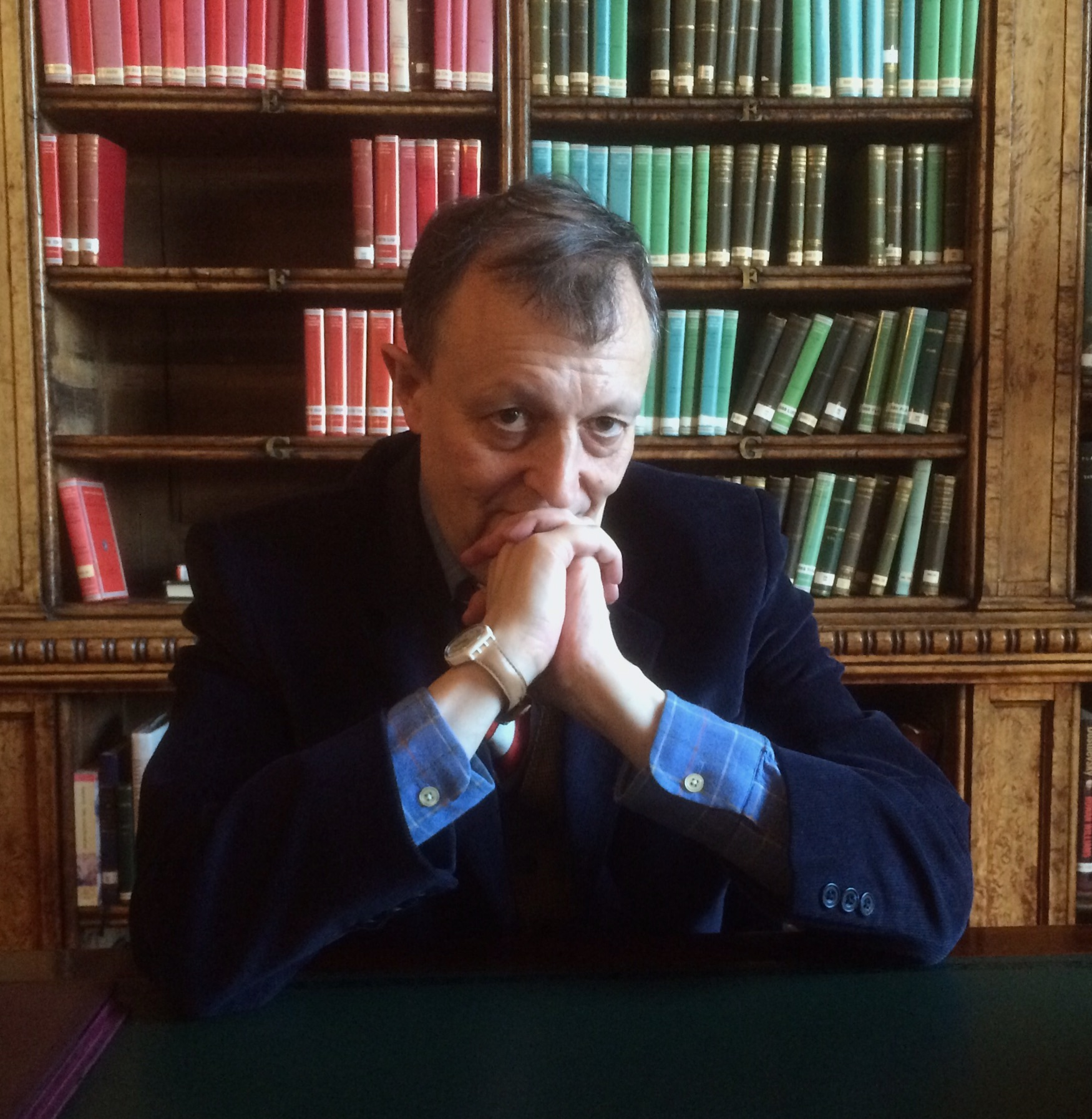
- Born: 24 September 1953 (age 73)
- Education: St John's College, Cambridge
- Occupations: Author, historian
- Writing career
- Language: English
- Genre: Biography
- Subject: British Biographies
- Notable work: List

Michael Anthony Bloch (born 24 September 1953) is an author and historian.

Educated at Portadown College and St John's College, Cambridge, he was called to the bar by the Inner Temple in 1978 and in 1979 became an assistant to Maître Suzanne Blum, the Parisian lawyer of the Duke and Duchess of Windsor.

Bloch's books include several about the Duke and Duchess, an authorized biography of James Lees-Milne, a study of the Liberal leader Jeremy Thorpe, and a biography of Frederick Matthias Alexander, founder of the Alexander Technique. Bloch was once the lover of Lees-Milne, writing in 2009: "I thought he was quite simply the most wonderful person I had ever met". In a review, it was noted that Bloch in his biography of Lees-Milne had a "laudable objectivity" about him, despite being one of his "most loyal and long-term late-in-life amours".

== Books ==
- The Duke of Windsor's War (Weidenfeld, 1982) ISBN 0-297-77947-8
- Operation Willi (Weidenfeld, 1984)
- Wallis and Edward: The Intimate Correspondence of the Duke and Duchess of Windsor (Weidenfeld, 1986) ISBN 0-671-61209-3
- The Secret File of the Duke of Windsor (Bantam Press, 1988) ISBN 0-593-01667-X
- The Reign and Abdication of Edward VIII (Bantam Press, 1990)
- Ribbentrop (Bantam Press, 1992)
- The Duchess of Windsor (Weidenfeld, 1996), ISBN 978-0297835905
- FM: The Life of Frederick Matthias Alexander, Founder of the Alexander Technique (Little Brown, 2004)
- James Lees-Milne: The Life (John Murray, 2009) ISBN 978-0719565502
- Jeremy Thorpe (Little Brown, 2014)
- Closet Queens: Some 20th Century British Politicians (Little Brown, 2015)

Bloch edited the later diaries of James Lees-Milne for publication by John Murray: Deep Romantic Chasm, 1979-81 (2000); Holy Dread, 1982-84 (2001); Beneath a Waning Moon, 1985-97 (2003); Ceaseless Turmoil, 1988-92 (2004); The Milk of Paradise, 1993-97 (2005). He also abridged the original 12-volume series in 3 volumes: Diaries, 1942-54 (2006); Diaries, 1971-83 (2007); Diaries, 1984-97 (2008).
