= Jeremy Thorpe =

British politician (1929–2014)

The Right Honourable Jeremy Thorpe
- Thorpe in 1965

Leader of the Liberal Party
- In office 18 January 1967 – 10 May 1976
- President: The Lord Wade; Desmond Banks; The Lord Beaumont of Whitley; Inga-Stina Robson; Stephen Terrell; Trevor Jones; The Lord Lloyd of Kilgerran; Arthur Holt; Margaret Wingfield; Basil Goldstone
- Preceded by: Jo Grimond
- Succeeded by: David Steel (Note: In the interim period between Thorpe's resignation and Steel's election, Jo Grimond briefly served as stand-in leader.)

Member of Parliament for North Devon
- In office 8 October 1959 – 7 April 1979
- Preceded by: James Lindsay
- Succeeded by: Antony Speller

Personal details
- Born: John Jeremy Thorpe; 29 April 1929 London, England
- Died: 4 December 2014 (aged 85) London, England
- Party: Liberal (until 1988); Liberal Democrats (from 1988)
- Spouses: Caroline Allpass (m. 1968; died 1970); Marion Stein (m. 1973; died 2014)
- Children: 1
- Parents: John Henry Thorpe; Ursula Norton-Griffiths
- Relatives: John Norton-Griffiths (grandfather)
- Education: Trinity College, Oxford

John Jeremy Thorpe (29 April 1929 – 4 December 2014) was a British politician who was Member of Parliament (MP) for North Devon from 1959 to 1979 and Leader of the Liberal Party from 1967 to 1976. In May 1979 he was tried at the Old Bailey on charges of conspiracy and incitement to murder his former boyfriend, Norman Scott. Thorpe was acquitted on all charges, but the case, and the scandal surrounding it, ended his political career.

Thorpe was the son and grandson of Conservative MPs, but decided to align with the small and ailing Liberal Party. After studying Law at the University of Oxford, he became one of the Liberals' brightest stars in the 1950s. He entered Parliament at the age of 30, rapidly made his mark, and was elected party leader in 1967. After an uncertain start during which the party lost ground, Thorpe capitalised on the growing unpopularity of the Conservative and Labour parties to lead the Liberals through a period of electoral success. This culminated in the general election of February 1974, when the Liberals won 6 million votes out of some 31 million cast. Under the first-past-the-post electoral system, this gave them only 14 seats, but in a hung parliament, no party having an overall majority, Thorpe was in a strong position. He was offered a cabinet post by the Conservative prime minister, Edward Heath, if he would bring the Liberals into a coalition government. His price for such a deal, reform of the electoral system, was rejected by Heath, who resigned in favour of a minority Labour government.

The February 1974 election was the high-water mark of Thorpe's career. Thereafter his and his party's fortunes declined, particularly from late 1975 when rumours of his involvement in a plot to murder Norman Scott began to multiply. Thorpe resigned the leadership in May 1976 when his position became untenable. When the matter came to court three years later, Thorpe chose not to give evidence to avoid being cross-examined by counsel for the prosecution. This left many questions unanswered; despite his acquittal, Thorpe was discredited and did not return to public life. From the mid-1980s he was disabled by Parkinson's disease. During his long retirement he gradually recovered the affections of his party, and by the time of his death was honoured by a later generation of leaders, who drew attention to his record as an internationalist, a supporter of human rights and an opponent of apartheid and all forms of racism.

== Family background and early childhood ==
John Jeremy Thorpe was born in South Kensington, London, on 29 April 1929. His father was John Henry Thorpe, a lawyer and politician who was Member of Parliament for Manchester Rusholme from 1919 to 1923. His mother, Ursula Norton-Griffiths, was the daughter of another Conservative MP, Sir John Norton-Griffiths, widely known as "Empire Jack" because of his passionate imperialism. The Thorpe family claimed kinship with distant forebears carrying the name, including Sir Robert Thorpe, who was briefly Lord Chancellor in 1372, and Thomas Thorpe, who was Speaker of the House of Commons in 1453–1454. There is no direct evidence of any link between these figures and Jeremy Thorpe's family.

The more recent Thorpe ancestors were Irish, stemming from the elder of two brothers who were, according to family tradition, soldiers under Cromwell during the re-conquest of Ireland. Both were rewarded with land; the descendants of the younger brother—from County Carlow—prospered in Dublin as High Sheriffs and Lord Mayors, but those of the elder lost their land and became tenant farmers and tradesmen. Jeremy Thorpe's great-grandfather, William Thorpe, was a Dublin policeman who, having been a labourer, joined the police as a constable and rose to the rank of superintendent. One of his many sons, John Thorpe, became an Anglican priest and served as Archdeacon of Macclesfield from 1922 to 1932. The archdeacon's marriage in 1884 to a daughter of the prosperous Anglo-Irish Aylmer family brought considerable wealth to the Thorpes, as did his elder daughter Olive's marriage into the influential Christie-Miller family of Cheshire. Both John Henry and Jeremy Thorpe would benefit from this connection, as the Christie-Millers paid the costs of their education.

Thorpe was his parents' third child, following two sisters. His upbringing was privileged and protected, under the care of nannies and nursemaids until, in 1935, he began attending Wagner's day school in Queen's Gate. He became a proficient violinist, and often performed at school concerts. Although John Henry Thorpe was no longer in parliament, he had maintained many of his political contacts and friendships, and leading politicians were regularly entertained at the Thorpe home. Among the strongest of these friendships was that with the Lloyd George family—Ursula Thorpe was a close friend of the former Liberal prime minister's daughter, Megan, who became Jeremy's godmother. The former prime minister David Lloyd George, an occasional visitor, became Jeremy's political hero and role model, and helped to form his ambitions for a political career in the Liberal Party.

== Education ==
=== Schooling ===
In January 1938 Thorpe went to Cothill House, a school in Oxfordshire that prepared boys for entry to Eton College. By mid-1939 war looked likely, and the Thorpe family moved from London to the Surrey village of Limpsfield, where Thorpe attended Hazelwood School. War began in September 1939; in June 1940, with invasion threatening, the Thorpe children were sent to live with their American aunt, Kay Norton-Griffiths, in Boston. In September that year Thorpe began at the Rectory School in Pomfret, Connecticut. He remained there for three generally happy years; his main extracurricular task, he later recalled, was looking after the school's pigs. In 1943 it was thought safe for the children to return to England, and John Henry used his political connections to secure for Jeremy a passage in the Royal Navy cruiser HMS Phoebe.

Thorpe started at Eton in September 1943. He proved an indifferent scholar, he lacked sporting aptitude, and although superficially a rebel against conformity, his frequent toadying to authority earned him the nickname "Oily Thorpe". He also annoyed his fellow-pupils by parading his acquaintance with a range of famous and important people. He offended the school's traditionalists by resigning from the school's cadet force, and shocked others by expressing his intention to marry Princess Margaret, then second in line to the British throne. Thorpe revealed little about his Eton years, beyond his membership of the school orchestra and his winning a cup for his violin playing—he briefly considered the possibility of a career as a professional violinist. His time at Eton was marred by the death of his father in 1944, at the age of 57.

=== Oxford ===
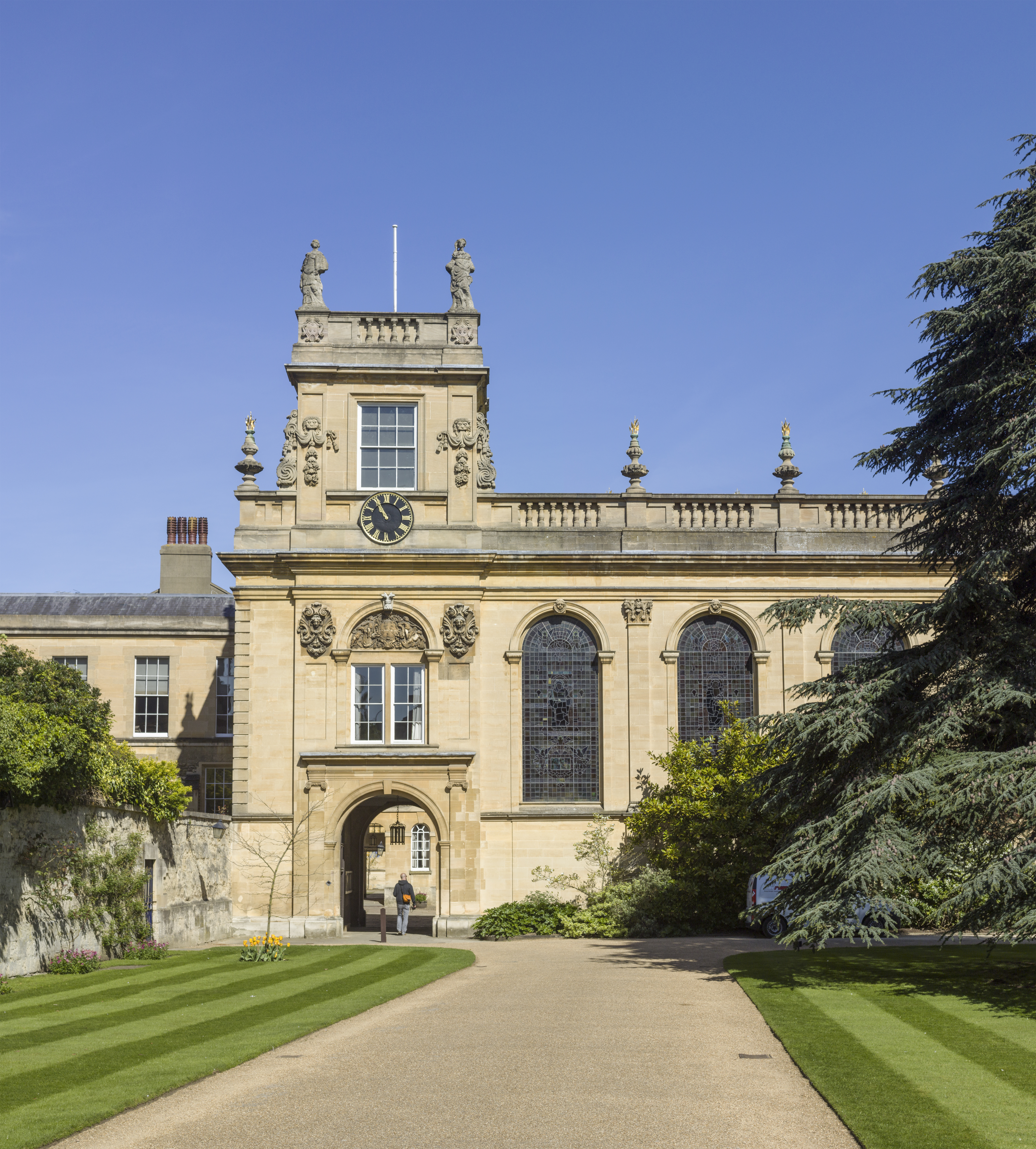
Trinity College, Oxford

Having secured a place at Trinity College, Oxford, Thorpe left Eton in March 1947. In September he began 18 months' National Service, but within six weeks was discharged on medical grounds after collapsing while attempting an assault course. (Note: As Thorpe had apparently told his friends that he would avoid his national service commitment by simulating a seizure that would convince the medical authorities, it seems likely that the "seizure" was a deception.) As his place at Oxford was unavailable until the following year, Thorpe worked as a temporary preparatory school teacher before his admission to Trinity on 8 October 1948.

Thorpe was reading Law, but his primary interests at Oxford were political and social. From his earliest undergraduate days he drew attention to himself by his flamboyant behaviour; according to Thorpe's biographer, Michael Bloch, his "pallid appearance, dark hair and eyes and angular features, gave him a diabolonian air". He was quick to seek political office, initially in the Oxford University Liberal Club (OULC) which, despite the doldrums affecting the Liberal Party nationally, was a thriving club with over 800 members. Thorpe was elected to the club's committee at the end of his first term; in November 1949 he became its president. Outside Oxford, Thorpe showed a genuine commitment to Liberalism in his enthusiastic contributions to the party's national election campaigns, and on reaching his 21st birthday in April 1950, applied to have his name added to the party's list of possible parliamentary candidates.

Beyond the OULC, Thorpe achieved the presidency of the Oxford University Law Society, although his principal objective was the presidency of the Oxford Union, an office frequently used as a stepping-stone to national prominence. Normally, would-be presidents first served in the Union's junior offices, as secretary, treasurer or librarian, but Thorpe, having impressed as a confident and forceful debater, decided early in 1950 to try directly for the presidency. He was easily defeated by the future broadcaster Robin Day. His single-minded pursuit of office, and the dubious strategies he sometimes employed, led to some acrimonious campaigns, but he gained many supporters, and later in 1950 beat two formidable contenders—the socialist Dick Taverne and the Conservative William Rees-Mogg—to secure the presidency for the Hilary term of 1951.

Thorpe's term as president was marked by the range of distinguished guest speakers that he recruited, among them the future Lord Chancellor Lord Hailsham, the barrister and former Liberal MP Norman Birkett, and the humorist Stephen Potter. The time-consuming nature of his various offices meant that Thorpe required a fourth year to complete his law studies, which ended in the summer of 1952 with a third-class honours degree.

At Oxford, Thorpe enjoyed numerous friendships with his contemporaries, many of whom later achieved distinction. These were almost exclusively with men; even so, he was not identified as a member of any of Oxford's homosexual sets. He confided to a friend that politics provided him with the necessary level of emotional excitement, thus making sexual relationships unnecessary. Thus, Bloch suggests, he was accepted by his fellow-students as "a basically asexual character, wrapped up in politics and his career".

== Early career ==
=== Parliamentary candidate ===
Having been accepted as a potential Liberal parliamentary candidate, Thorpe looked for a constituency. The general elections of 1950 and 1951 had seen the party's MPs fall, first to nine, then six; some commentators saw little future except "further attrition and further losses to the two major parties". (Note: In 1951 the incoming prime minister Winston Churchill sought to boost his slender majority by inviting the six Liberals into a formal coalition. This offer was refused by the Liberal leader Clement Davies. The party's historian David Dutton believes that had the offer been accepted, the Liberal Party might have ceased its independent existence.) The journalist Julian Glover writes that Thorpe's determination to stay with the party, despite its woes, showed a more principled commitment to Liberalism than many critics have acknowledged; his prospects of reaching parliament would have been considerably greater within either the Conservative or Labour parties.

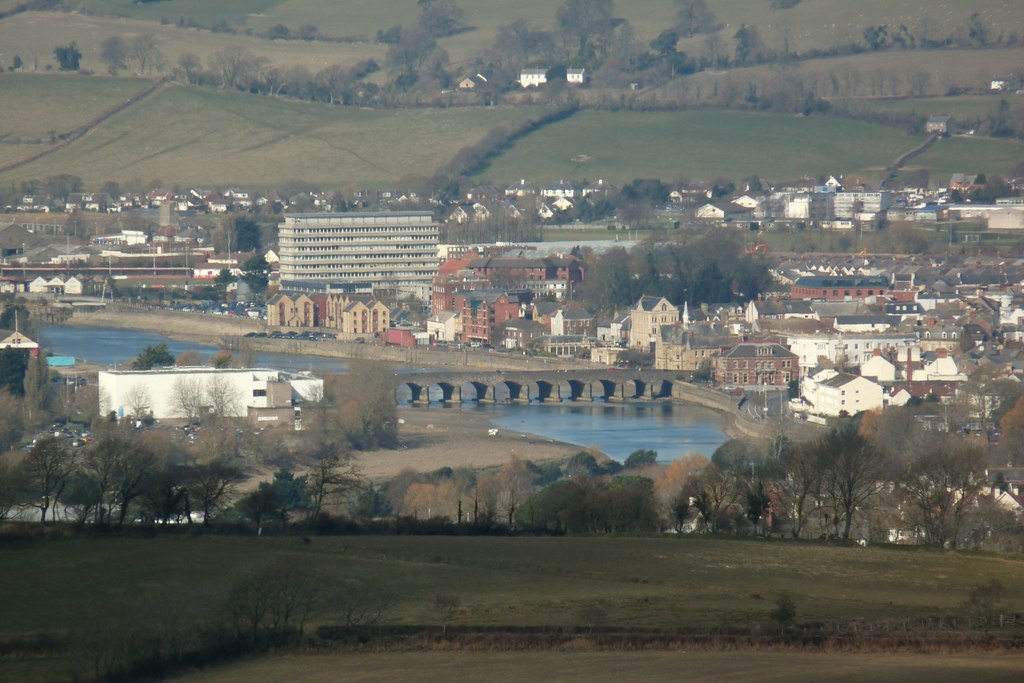
Barnstaple, at the heart of the North Devon constituency

Initially the young would-be candidate was offered the opportunity of succeeding the party leader, Clement Davies, in the Welsh seat of Montgomeryshire, when Davies decided to retire. There being no immediate prospect of that, Thorpe looked elsewhere, in particular to Devon and Cornwall, where the party had long-standing traditions and had polled respectably in 1950 and 1951. In these elections Thorpe had assisted the Liberal candidate for North Cornwall, Dingle Foot, whose agent recommended him to the neighbouring North Devon constituency. The Torrington local party was also anxious to adopt Thorpe as their candidate, while Foot saw him as a possible successor in North Cornwall. Thorpe chose to fight North Devon, a seat once held by the Liberals, although in 1951 the party had finished in third place behind Conservative and Labour, with less than 20% of the vote.

Thorpe was adopted as North Devon's Liberal candidate in April 1952. His political stance matched that of other young activists, who believed that the party should offer a radical non-socialist alternative to the Conservative government. He and others founded the Radical Reform Group, to drive the party in that direction. He spent much of his spare time cultivating the voters in North Devon; at rallies and on the doorstep he mixed local concerns with conspicuously liberal views on larger, international issues such as colonialism and apartheid. When Anthony Eden, who had succeeded Winston Churchill as prime minister, called a snap general election in April 1955, Thorpe fought an energetic local campaign. He succeeded in halving the Conservative majority in the constituency, and restoring the Liberals to second place.

=== Barrister-at-law and television journalist ===
In need of a paid occupation Thorpe opted for the law, and in February 1954 was called to the bar in the Inner Temple. Initially he found it difficult to earn a living from his fees; he needed another source of income, and found it in television journalism. Thorpe was employed by Associated-Rediffusion, at first as chairman of a science discussion programme, The Scientist Replies, and later as an interviewer on the station's major current affairs vehicle This Week. Among various assignments for This Week, he travelled to Ghana in 1957 to cover the country's independence celebrations, and in 1958 he reported from Jordan on a plot to assassinate King Hussein. Thorpe was a skilled broadcaster, and in addition to his television work he became a regular guest on the BBC radio programme Any Questions? In 1959 he was offered the post of chief commentator by Associated Rediffusion, but as the condition was that he gave up his parliamentary candidature, he declined.

Through the later 1950s Thorpe juggled his legal and television work with his political duties in North Devon, where he worked tirelessly to build up support. From September 1956 the Liberal Party was led by Jo Grimond, a more up-to-date figure than his elderly predecessor Davies, and more in tune with the ideas of Thorpe and the Radical Reform Group. After an uncertain beginning—the Liberals lost one of their six seats to Labour in a February 1957 by-election (Note: The seat was Carmarthen, and the victorious candidate was Megan Lloyd George, who had transferred her allegiance to the Labour Party.)—Grimond's leadership began to produce results. The party polled well in a series of by-elections during 1957 and 1958, culminating in a victory at Torrington in March 1958—a seat which the party had not contested in the 1955 general election. Thorpe, who had figured prominently in the Torrington campaign, saw this victory in an adjoining Devon constituency as a harbinger of his own future success.

Thorpe's television and radio work had brought him a measure of celebrity, and his colourful and individualistic campaigning style was widely admired. The journalist Christopher Booker recalled: "He had an extraordinary ability both to cheer up his followers and send up his opponents". Throughout the 1950s Thorpe was leading a secret homosexual life, at a time when all such activity was illegal in the United Kingdom, and subject to heavy penalties; exposure would have ended his political prospects instantly. This sexual orientation, concealed from the wider public, was known and tolerated in North Devon, and was at least suspected by many in the wider Liberal Party.

== Member of Parliament ==
Thorpe's efforts in North Devon came to fruition in the October 1959 general election, when he won the seat with a majority of 362 over his Conservative opponent—the Liberal Party's solitary gain in what was generally an electoral triumph for Harold Macmillan's Conservative government. (Note: The Liberals failed to hold their recent by-election gain in the adjoining Torrington seat, which returned to the Conservatives.) On 10 November 1959 he made his maiden speech during a debate on the government's local employment bill. He highlighted poor communications as the principal reason for the lack of employment opportunities in North Devon, and called for urgent government action.

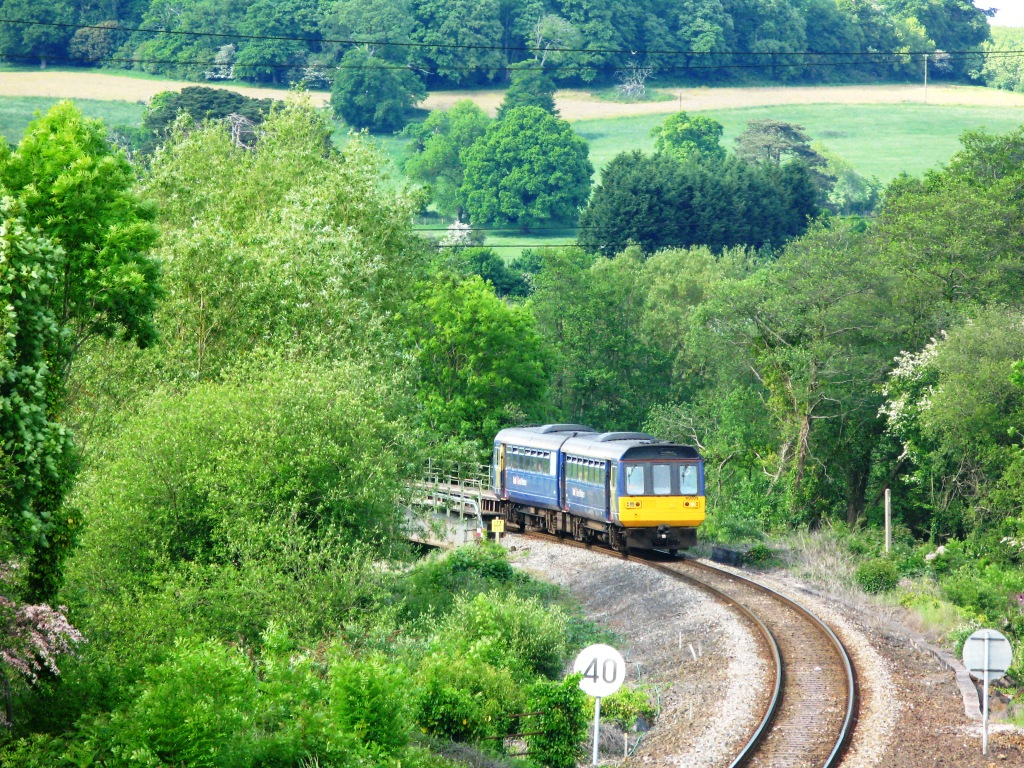
The Barnstaple to Exeter railway line, which survived the Beeching cuts

Thorpe was a diligent MP, active in promoting local issues—a new general hospital, and a link road to the Exeter-Taunton motorway—and campaigned successfully to save the Barnstaple-to-Exeter railway line from the "Beeching axe". On broader questions he made no secret of his anti-hanging, pro-immigrant, pro-Europe opinions, largely not shared by his constituents. He championed freedom from colonial and minority rule, and was an outspoken opponent of regimes he considered oppressive such as those in South Africa and the short-lived Federation of Rhodesia and Nyasaland. He was also noted for his verve and wit; when in 1962, after a series of by-election disasters, Macmillan sacked a third of his cabinet, Thorpe's reported comment, an inversion of the biblical verse John 15:13, was "Greater love hath no man than this, that he lay down his friends for his life".

Within the Liberal Party, Thorpe helped to found an informal organisation known as "Winnable Seats", which directed energy and funding to selected target constituencies. This strategy led to some good by-election performances during 1961–62, culminating in March 1962 with victory in Orpington, where a 14,760 Conservative majority was turned into a Liberal majority of 7,855. These results were accompanied by substantial Liberal gains in municipal elections; national opinion polls briefly showed the party on equal terms with the Labour and Conservative parties. This advance was barely reflected in the results of the October 1964 general election; the party nearly doubled its share of the national vote, to 11.2%, but secured a net gain of only two seats. One of the new Liberals was Peter Bessell, who won the Cornish seat of Bodmin. In North Devon, Thorpe increased his personal majority to over 5,000.

After the election, which Labour won with a small majority, Thorpe was seen by many as Grimond's natural successor; his speeches were generally the highlights of the party's annual assemblies, and he strengthened his position when, in 1965, he secured the important post of party treasurer. He proved to be an excellent fund-raiser, although his insistence on personal control of much of the party's funds aroused criticism and resentment. In July 1965, after the end of the Federation of Rhodesia and Nyasaland, Thorpe toured Central and East Africa, visiting both Zambia and Rhodesia. (Note: The Federation had dissolved in 1964, with Northern Rhodesia and Nyasaland becoming the separate independent states of Zambia and Malawi. Southern Rhodesia, renamed "Rhodesia" in common parlance, remained as a self-governing British colony.) On his return he advised the prime minister, Harold Wilson, that the all-white Rhodesian government under Ian Smith would make a unilateral declaration of independence (UDI) before the end of the year, unless deterred by the threat of armed intervention. Wilson would not countenance the use of troops; the UDI took place on 11 November. In a speech to the Liberal Assembly in September 1966, Thorpe condemned Wilson's handling of the Rhodesia issue ("misjudged and misplanned"), and called for the bombing by United Nations aircraft of the rail link through which the post-UDI Rhodesian government received its oil supplies. The speech delighted the more radical elements in the Liberal Party but outraged many Conservatives, who used the derisive nickname "Bomber Thorpe" for the rest of Thorpe's parliamentary career.

In March 1966 Wilson called an election, hoping to improve his tiny parliamentary majority. He did so, increasing it to almost 100. The Liberals, although their overall share of the vote fell to 8.5%, increased their number of MPs from nine to 12, an indication of success in targeted campaigning under the "Winnable Seats" strategy. Thorpe suffered a personal disappointment in North Devon, where his majority dropped to 1,166.

== Party leader ==
=== 1967–1970 ===
Following the 1966 election, Grimond confided to senior party officials that he wished soon to step down from the leadership. Thorpe was now the senior Liberal MP after Grimond, and the party's highest-profile member, although Tim Beaumont, chairman of the party's organising committee, noted in his diary: "I am pretty certain that he has little popularity within the Parliamentary Party". (Note: Beaumont's diary at this time mentions that "the question of Jeremy's security standing is an unfortunate one ... this might stop him getting a Privy Councillorship"—indicating an awareness by party officials at this early date that Thorpe's private life might present problems.) When Grimond finally resigned on 17 January 1967, an election to replace him was arranged to take place within 48 hours, leaving little time for manoeuvring. The 12 Liberal MPs formed the whole electorate; after the first ballot, Thorpe had secured six votes against three each for Eric Lubbock, the Orpington MP, and Emlyn Hooson who had succeeded to the Montgomeryshire seat. On 18 January Lubbock and Hooson withdrew their candidacies, and Thorpe was declared the winner.

Thorpe's Liberalism was essentially romantic and emotional. He reacted strongly against bone-headed Establishment snobbery, arrogant management or racial injustice, but showed scant interest in formulating any coherent political philosophy.

— Thorpe's obituary, The Daily Telegraph, 4 December 2014.

As Liberal leader, Thorpe provided a clear contrast with the pedestrian images of Wilson and Edward Heath, the Conservative leader since March 1965. He was considerably younger, and much more telegenic. His first years of leadership were problematic; he found himself at odds with the Young Liberals, who were advocating policies far to the left of the Liberal mainstream. Their demands for workers' control in nationalised industries, British withdrawal from NATO, and massive cuts in the defence budget, caused bitter disputes within the party and damaged its public image. At this time the political climate was not conducive to radical policies; the Wilson government's rapid descent into unpopularity brought a sharp swing to the right among voters. The beneficiaries were the Conservatives, who made spectacular by-election gains at Labour's expense while the Liberals failed to make any real impact. Discontent against Thorpe's leadership was being voiced within a year of his election, culminating in June 1968 when disaffected senior party members combined with Young Liberals in an attempt to depose him. Thorpe had just married Caroline Allpass, and was abroad on honeymoon when the plotters struck. The timing of their attempted coup, widely seen in and out of the party as treachery, ensured that on Thorpe's return the party executive backed him by 48 votes to 2.

Thorpe's marriage provided him with a period of emotional stability; a son, Rupert, was born in April 1969. Shortly afterwards, Thorpe received a political boost when the Liberals unexpectedly won a by-election at Birmingham Ladywood, in a previously safe Labour seat. This was a solitary success, and the party faced the general election of June 1970 with little confidence. The results justified their gloomy premonitions; the party's share of the vote fell to 7.5%, and seven of its thirteen seats, including Ladywood, were lost. Thorpe barely hung on in North Devon, his majority reduced to 369. Three of his colleagues had comparably small majorities; only Grimond, Hooson and Russell Johnston were relatively safe. Heath's Conservatives secured a 30-seat majority. (Note: Interviewed much later, Thorpe confided that the party had nearly died in 1970: "If I hadn't survived as an MP I really don't know if there would still be a Liberal Party". If he had lost his seat, he said, he might have pursued an alternative career in television.)

=== 1970–1974 ===
The monument to Caroline Thorpe on Codden Hill, Bishop's Tawton. It was designed by Clough Williams-Ellis and dedicated on 4 December 1971 by the Archbishop of Canterbury and the Bishop of Crediton.

Following the Liberals' poor election performance Thorpe came under fire, but such criticisms were stifled when, ten days after the election, Caroline Thorpe was killed in a car crash. For the rest of 1970 and for much of 1971, Thorpe was preoccupied with his loss and his plan for a permanent memorial to Caroline. Meanwhile, the party began to recover, chiefly through its adoption of "community politics"—engagement with local rather than national issues—and achieved modest gains in the 1971 local elections.

By early 1972, with the monument to Caroline erected on Codden Hill, Thorpe was fully re-engaged in political life. In February he assisted the passage through the House of Commons of Heath's European Communities Bill, approving the United Kingdom's accession to the European Economic Community. The bill was opposed by Labour and by some Conservatives. By aligning his party with the government, Thorpe ensured a majority of eight for the bill's second reading, and it duly became law. By mid-1972 the Liberals' fortunes were rising significantly; the public was equally disenchanted with both major parties, and community politics were proving popular. Impressive local election results were followed by sensational by-election results. In October 1972 Rochdale was won from Labour, and in the next year four victories were achieved over the Conservatives: Sutton, Isle of Ely, Ripon and Berwick-upon-Tweed.

On 14 March 1973 Thorpe married Marion Stein, a concert pianist and the former wife of George Lascelles, 7th Earl of Harewood. The couple had been brought together a year earlier by a mutual acquaintance, the pianist Moura Lympany. The year ended less happily for Thorpe, when the secondary banking firm of London & County Securities, of which he had been a director since May 1971, collapsed amid rumours of mismanagement and fraud, marking the start of the secondary banking crisis of 1973–1975; the details were not revealed until 1976. In February 1974 Heath, whose government had been plagued by industrial unrest, called a general election on the issue of "Who governs Britain?". During the election campaign there was evidence of disaffection with both Heath and Wilson, and of a surge in Liberal support. Thorpe was confident that the party would make a significant breakthrough; on election day, 28 February, it secured its highest national vote to date, 6 million, and its highest share of the vote (19.3%) since 1929. Under the first-past-the-post voting system, these figures translated into just 14 seats. Thorpe's majority in North Devon rose to 11,072.

=== Coalition negotiations ===
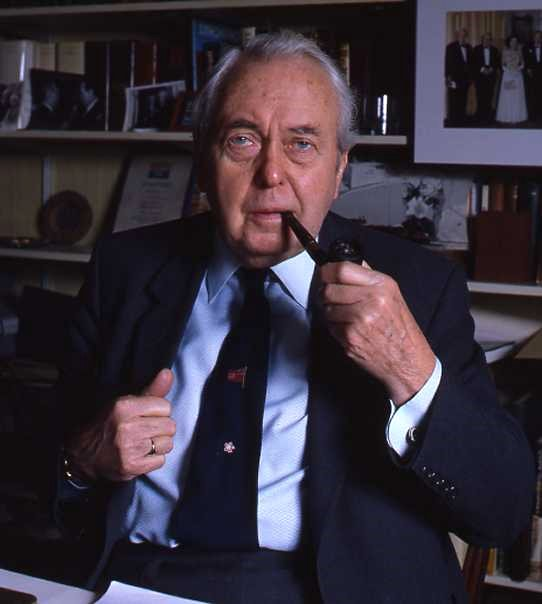
Harold Wilson, who formed a minority Labour government in the wake of the failed Heath–Thorpe coalition talks in March 1974

The February 1974 general election produced a hung parliament; neither Labour, with 301 seats, nor the Conservatives, with 297 seats, achieved an overall majority. As was his right as the sitting prime minister, Heath did not resign, hoping to persuade the Liberals into a Conservative-led coalition. He met Thorpe on 2 March to discuss possible bases for co-operation, Heath's preferred option being a formal coalition in which Thorpe would be given a cabinet post, (Note: Some accounts indicate that Thorpe was offered, or requested, the post of Home Secretary. Heath says that Thorpe expressed "a strong preference for the post"; according to the Cabinet Secretary Sir Robert Armstrong, such an appointment was discussed and dismissed. Thorpe denied making any claim to the post, and said that no specific ministry was ever mentioned; he later understood that Heath had in mind "a Foreign Office job with specific responsibility for Europe".) and junior ministries would be allocated to other senior Liberals. As the combined Conservative-Liberal vote amounted to 57% of the electorate, such a government would, Heath thought, have some moral legitimacy. If Thorpe would not accept coalition, a less formal basis of inter-party co-operation might be agreed which would enable the Conservative government to retain office.

The next day, following discussions with senior colleagues, Thorpe advised Heath that a commitment to electoral reform would be a prerequisite to any arrangement between the two parties. Thorpe proposed that Heath establish a Speaker's Conference whose recommendations on electoral reform would, if acceptable to the Liberals, form the basis of subsequent legislation with full cabinet approval. Following further consultations with their parties, the two leaders met again; Heath reported that while his party would not object to a Speaker's Conference, they could not commit themselves in advance to accepting its recommendations, which would be subject to a free House of Commons vote. This was unacceptable to Thorpe, who then made a separate proposal that an all-party "Government of national unity" be formed to tackle the urgent economic problems facing the country. This idea was rejected by Heath, who resigned on Monday 4 March.

Thorpe later admitted that a coalition agreement would have torn the party apart; the more radical elements, in particular the Young Liberals, would never have accepted it. Furthermore, Thorpe said that "even with our support Heath wouldn't have had a parliamentary majority"; without some arrangements with the Scottish Nationalists or the Ulster Unionists, the coalition could have been brought down by the first vote on the Queen's Speech. Following Heath's resignation, Wilson formed a Labour minority government.

=== Declining fortunes ===
As Harold Wilson did not have an overall majority after the February 1974 election, he was widely expected to call another election before too long; he did so in September 1974. Thorpe anticipated a turning point in the Liberals' fortunes and campaigned under the slogan "one more heave", aiming for a complete breakthrough with entering a coalition a last resort. The phrase is attributed to advertising agent and Liberal parliamentary candidate Adrian Slade. Future Liberal Party leader David Steel called the whole campaign "a slightly less successful re-run of February." In the October 1974 general election, the Liberals received over 700,000 fewer votes and returned 13 MPs, down one, with Wilson achieving an overall majority of three.

Thorpe and the Liberals were deflated by the outcome of the October 1974 election. Wilson's majority, albeit slim, denied Thorpe the role of kingmaker, leaving the Liberals without a clear role; as Dutton observes, apart from being neither Conservative or Labour, the Liberals lacked a distinctive identity and their policies were largely unknown to the public. A further problem for the party was the divergence between its activists, who were radicals well to the left of the official party, and a large section of its recent supporters who were disgruntled Conservatives. Thorpe, whose personal majority in North Devon had fallen to under 7,000 in October, confided to an associate that, unless the party were soon to make a significant impact, his days as leader might be numbered.

During 1975 Thorpe campaigned for electoral reform, citing the "Great Vote Robbery" of the year before. He argued that electoral reform on a proportional basis would bring about a centrist stability to British politics that would favour British business. In the June 1975 referendum on the UK's continuing membership of the EEC, Thorpe campaigned for a "yes" vote alongside the pro-Europeans of both major parties, appearing with Heath (recently replaced as Conservative leader by Margaret Thatcher) at the Oxford Union. (Note: Thorpe initially greeted Thatcher's assumption of the Conservative leadership with pleasure, writing to Hayward that she was "far more amenable than Heath. I could do business with her". Elsewhere, Thorpe had described Heath as "a plum pudding around whom no one knew how to light the brandy".) The referendum resulted in a two-to-one approval of the UK's membership, but Thorpe failed to stem the decline in his party's electoral fortunes. In the Woolwich West by-election on 26 June 1975 the party lost more than two-thirds of its October 1974 vote, a "major humiliation" according to The Guardian.

=== Relationship with Norman Scott ===
Thorpe's homosexual activities from time to time came to the attention of the authorities, and were investigated by the police; information was added to his MI5 file, but in no case was action taken against him. In 1971 he survived a party inquiry after a complaint against him by Norman Scott, a riding instructor and would-be model. Scott maintained that in the early 1960s he had been in a sexual relationship with Thorpe, who had subsequently mistreated him. The inquiry dismissed the allegations, but the danger represented by Scott continued to preoccupy Thorpe who, according to his confidant David Holmes, felt "he would never be safe with that man around".

Scott (known then as Norman Josiffe) had first met Thorpe early in 1961 when the former was a 20-year-old groom working for one of Thorpe's wealthy friends. The initial meeting was brief, but nearly a year later Scott, by then in London and destitute, called at the House of Commons to ask the MP for help. Thorpe later acknowledged that a friendship had developed, but denied any physical relationship; Scott claimed that he had been seduced by Thorpe on the night after the Commons meeting. Over the following years Thorpe made numerous attempts to help Scott find accommodation and work, but Scott became increasingly resentful towards Thorpe, threatening him with exposure.

In 1965 Thorpe asked his parliamentary colleague Peter Bessell to help him resolve the problem. Bessell met Scott and warned him that his threats against Thorpe might be considered blackmail; he offered to help Scott obtain a new National Insurance card, the lack of which had been a long-running source of irritation. This quietened matters for a while, but within a year Scott came calling again. With Thorpe's agreement, Bessell began paying Scott a "retainer" of £5 a week (equivalent to £80 in 2025), supposedly as compensation for the welfare benefits that Scott had been unable to obtain because of his missing card. Bessell later stated that by 1968 Thorpe was considering ways in which Scott might be permanently silenced; he thought David Holmes might organise this. Holmes had been best man at Thorpe's wedding, and was completely loyal to him.

When Scott unexpectedly married, on 13 May 1969, it appeared that the problem might be over, but by 1970 the marriage had ended. Early in 1971 Scott moved to the village of Tal-y-bont, in North Wales, where he befriended a widow, Gwen Parry-Jones, to whom he recounted his tale of ill-treatment at the hands of Thorpe. She passed the information to Emlyn Hooson, who was MP for the adjoining Welsh constituency; Hooson precipitated the party inquiry which cleared Thorpe. After Parry-Jones's death the following year, Scott fell into a depression and for a while was quiescent. In time, he began to tell his story to anyone who would listen. By 1974 Thorpe, at the crest of the Liberal revival, was terrified of exposure that might lose him the Liberal leadership. As Dominic Sandbrook observes in his history of the times: "The stakes had never been higher; silencing Scott had never been more urgent".

=== Resignation ===
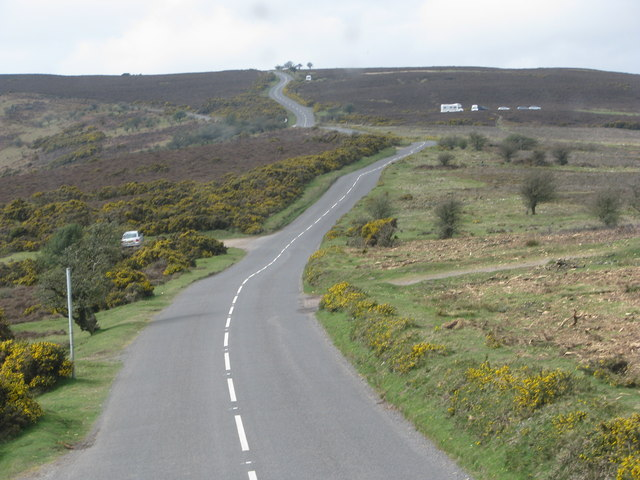
Porlock Hill in Somerset, scene of Newton's attempted shooting of Scott

Over the years Scott made several attempts to publicise his story, but no newspapers were interested. The satirical magazine Private Eye decided in late 1972 that the story "was defamatory, unproveable, and above all was ten years old". From late 1974 Holmes took the lead in furthering plans to silence Scott; through various intermediaries he found Andrew Newton, an airline pilot, who said he would dispose of Scott for a fee of between £5,000 and £10,000. Meanwhile, Thorpe procured £20,000 from Sir Jack Hayward (equivalent to £237,000 in 2025), the Bahamas-based millionaire businessman who had previously donated to the Liberal Party, stating that this was to cover election expenses incurred during 1974. Thorpe arranged for these funds to be secretly channelled to Holmes rather than the party. He later denied that this money had been used to pay Newton, or anyone else, as part of a conspiracy. (Note: In June 1978 Thorpe stated to the police that the money had been "deposited with accountants [as] an iron reserve against any shortage of funds at any future election", which contradicted his explanation to Hayward. The money was eventually repaid to Hayward by Thorpe.)

In October 1975 Newton made a bungled attempt to shoot Scott that resulted in the killing of Scott's Great Dane Rinka. Newton was arrested on charges of possession of a firearm with intent to endanger life, yet the press remained muted, possibly awaiting the bigger story that they hoped would break. Their reticence ended in January 1976 when Scott, in court on a minor social security fraud charge, claimed he was being hounded because of his previous sexual relationship with Thorpe. This statement, made in court and thus protected from the libel laws, was widely reported.

On 29 January the Department of Trade published its report into the collapse of London & County Securities. The report criticised Thorpe's failure to investigate the true nature of the company before involving himself, "a cautionary tale for any leading politician". Thorpe received some relief when his former colleague Peter Bessell, who had resigned from parliament and relocated to California to escape from a string of business failures, re-emerged in early February after discovery by the Daily Mail. Bessell gave muddled accounts of his involvement with Scott but insisted that his former chief was innocent of any wrongdoing.

On 16 March 1976 Newton's trial began at Exeter Crown Court, where Scott repeated his allegations against Thorpe despite the efforts of the prosecution's lawyers to silence him. Newton was found guilty and sentenced to two years' imprisonment, but did not incriminate Thorpe. The erosion of public support for the Liberal Party continued with several poor by-election results in March, which the former leader Grimond attributed to increasing lack of confidence in Thorpe. On 14 March, The Sunday Times printed Thorpe's answer to Scott's various allegations, under the heading "The Lies of Norman Scott". Nevertheless, many of the party's senior figures now felt that Thorpe should resign.

Thorpe's problems multiplied when Bessell, alarmed by his own position, confessed to the Daily Mail on 6 May that in his earlier statements he had lied to protect his former leader. Scott was threatening to publish personal letters from Thorpe who, to forestall him, arranged for The Sunday Times to print two letters from 1961. Although these did not conclusively indicate wrongdoing, their tone indicated that Thorpe had not been frank about the true nature of his friendship with Scott. On 10 May 1976, amid rising criticism, Thorpe resigned the party leadership, "convinced that a fixed determination to destroy the Leader could itself result in the destruction of the Party".

== Post-resignation ==
=== Interlude ===
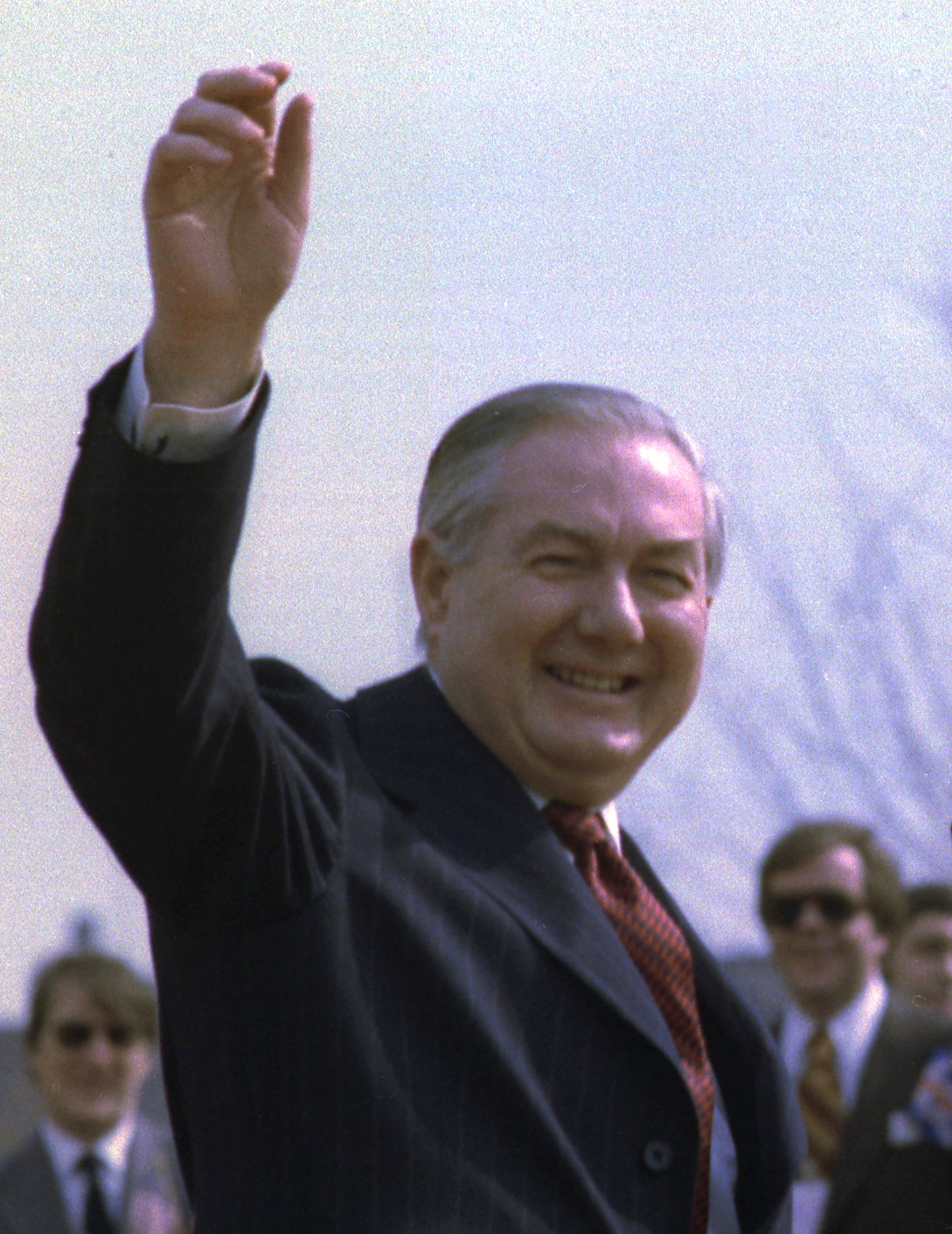
James Callaghan, Prime Minister from 1976 to 1979, who governed by courtesy of the 1977 Lib–Lab pact

Thorpe's resignation brought him a period of temporary calm. The new Liberal leader, David Steel, made him party spokesman on foreign affairs, with responsibility for European issues. Wilson had by this time retired as prime minister, and been replaced by James Callaghan. Thorpe lobbied the government hard for legislation to introduce direct elections to the European Parliament; at that time MEPs were appointed by member nations' parliaments.

By-election losses eroded and finally removed Labour's small parliamentary majority, and in March 1977 Callaghan was in danger of losing a confidence vote that would have precipitated a general election. Opinion polls indicated that an election at that time would have been equally disastrous for the Labour and Liberal parties; to ensure mutual survival, a "Lib–Lab pact" was agreed, whereby in return for certain policy concessions the Liberals would support the Government. Thorpe used his influence to insist that legislation for direct elections to the European Parliament was part of the pact, but was unable to secure his principal objective, a commitment to a proportional basis in these elections. In parliament, Thorpe spoke in favour of Scottish and Welsh devolution, arguing that there was no alternative to home rule except total separation. In the various debates related to the unresolved issue of Rhodesia, Thorpe pressed for the involvement of representatives from the African nationalists, in the form of the Patriotic Front, in negotiations for a peaceful settlement to the long-running Rhodesian Bush War.

Although the press was generally quiet following Thorpe's resignation, reporters were still investigating him. The most persistent of these were Barry Penrose and Roger Courtiour, collectively known as "Pencourt", who had begun by believing that Thorpe was a target of South African intelligence agencies, until their investigations led them to Bessell in California. Bessell, no longer covering for Thorpe, gave the reporters his version of the conspiracy to murder Scott, and Thorpe's role in it. Pencourt's progress was covered in Private Eye, to Thorpe's extreme vexation; when the pair attempted to question him outside his Devon home early in 1977, he threatened them with prosecution.

Thorpe's relatively peaceful interlude ended in October 1977 when Newton, released from prison, sold his story to the London Evening News. Newton's claim that he had been paid "by a leading Liberal" to kill Scott caused a sensation, and led to a prolonged police investigation. Throughout this period Thorpe endeavoured to continue his public life, in and out of parliament. In the House of Commons on 1 August 1978, when it appeared certain he would face criminal charges, he asked the Attorney-General what sum of capital possessed by an applicant would prevent him from receiving legal aid. The next day he made his final speech in the House, during a debate on Rhodesia.

On 4 August, Thorpe, along with Holmes and two of Holmes's associates, was charged with conspiracy to murder Scott. Thorpe was additionally charged with incitement to murder, on the basis of his alleged 1968 discussions with Bessell and Holmes. After being released on bail, Thorpe declared his innocence and his determination to refute the charges. Although he remained North Devon's MP he withdrew almost completely from public view, except for a brief theatrical appearance at the Liberals' 1978 annual assembly on 14 September—to the annoyance of the party's leaders who had asked him to stay away.

=== Committal, electoral defeat ===
In November 1978 Thorpe, Holmes and two of the latter's business acquaintances, John le Mesurier (a carpet salesman, not to be confused with the actor of that name) and George Deakin, appeared before magistrates at Minehead, Somerset, in a committal hearing to determine whether they should stand trial. The court heard evidence of a conspiracy from Scott, Newton and Bessell; it also learned that Bessell was being paid £50,000 by The Sunday Telegraph for his story. At the conclusion, the four defendants were committed for trial at the Old Bailey. This was set to begin on 30 April 1979, but when in March the government fell, and a general election was called for 3 May, the trial was postponed until 8 May.

Thorpe accepted the invitation of his local party to fight the North Devon seat, against the advice of friends who were certain he would lose. His campaign was largely ignored by the national party; of its leading figures only John Pardoe, the MP for North Cornwall, visited the constituency. Thorpe, supported by his wife, his mother and some loyal friends, fought hard, although much of his characteristic vigour was missing. He lost to his Conservative opponent by 8,500 votes. Overall, the Conservatives obtained a majority of 43 seats, and Margaret Thatcher became prime minister. The Liberal Party's share of the national vote fell to 13.8%, and its total seats from 13 to 11. Dutton attributes much of the fall in the Liberal vote to the lengthy adverse publicity generated by the Thorpe affair.

== Trial and acquittal ==
The trial, which lasted for six weeks, began on 8 May 1979 before Mr Justice Cantley. Thorpe was defended by George Carman. Carman quickly undermined Bessell's credibility by revealing that he had a significant interest in Thorpe's conviction; in the event of an acquittal, Bessell would receive only half of his newspaper fee. During his cross-examination of Scott on 22 May, Carman asked: "You knew Thorpe to be a man of homosexual tendencies in 1961?" This oblique admission of his client's sexuality was a stratagem to prevent the prosecution from calling witnesses, who would testify to Thorpe's sex life. Nevertheless, Carman insisted, there was no reliable evidence of any physical sexual relationship between Thorpe and Scott, whom Carman dismissed as "this inveterate liar, social climber and scrounger".

After weeks in which the court heard the prosecution's evidence from the committal hearings, the defence opened on 7 June. Deakin testified that although he introduced Newton to Holmes, he had thought that this was to help deal with a blackmailer—he knew nothing of a conspiracy to kill. Deakin was the only defendant to testify; Thorpe and the others chose to remain silent and call no witnesses, on the basis that the testimonies of Bessell, Scott and Newton had failed to make the prosecution's case.

On 18 June, following closing speeches from prosecution and defence counsel, the judge began his summing-up. While emphasising Thorpe's distinguished public record, he was scathing about the principal prosecution witnesses: Bessell was a "humbug", Scott a fraud, a sponger, a whiner, a parasite—"but of course he could still be telling the truth." Newton was "determined to milk the case as hard as he can." On 20 June the jury retired; they returned two days later and acquitted the four defendants on all charges. In a brief public statement, Thorpe said that he considered the verdict "a complete vindication." Scott said he was "unsurprised" by the outcome but was upset by the aspersions on his character made by the judge from the safety of the bench.

== Later life ==
Following his acquittal, Thorpe announced that he proposed to attend the 1979 Liberal assembly and the forthcoming Liberal International Congress in Canada. His failure to explain himself under oath was widely criticised in the press, and the public perception was that he had been fortunate to have "got off". Reluctantly, Thorpe accepted that there was no future role for him within the Liberal Party, and informed the North Devon association that he would not seek to fight the seat again. Steel expressed the hope that Thorpe would, "after a suitable period of rest and recuperation ... find many avenues where his great talents may be used."

In his search for a new career Thorpe applied unsuccessfully for the posts of administrator of the Aldeburgh Festival, and race relations adviser to the Greater London Council. His attempts to restart a career in television also came to nothing. In February 1982 it was announced that he was to become director of the British section of Amnesty International, but the appointment was opposed by many of the organisation's membership, and he withdrew from the post after a month of controversy. (Note: On 27 February 1982 The Times published a letter signed by David Astor, Richard Hoggart and others, stating that Thorpe's appointment "could seriously harm the work of Amnesty International. Mr Thorpe has shown himself to be a man of unsound judgment".) He kept his position as chairman of the political committee of the United Nations Association, but in 1985 the progression of Parkinson's disease, which had first been diagnosed in 1979, led to the curtailment of most of his public activity. He continued to live in North Devon, and in 1987 accepted the honorary presidency of the North Devon Liberal Democrat association, formed after the Liberal–SDP merger. He thought he might return to parliament via a life peerage in the House of Lords, but although friends lobbied on his behalf, the merged party's leadership refused to recommend him. Within the party generally, feelings towards him warmed, and when he attended the 1997 annual conference he received a standing ovation.

If it happened now I think ... the public would be kinder. Back then they were very troubled by it; it offended their set of values.

— Thorpe interview, The Guardian, 28 January 2008.

In 1999 Thorpe published an anecdotal memoir, In My Own Time, an anthology of his experiences in public life. In the book he repeated his denial of any sexual relationship with Scott, and maintained that the decision not to offer evidence was made to avoid prolonging the trial, since it was clear that the prosecution's case was "shot through with lies, inaccuracies and admissions". In the 2005 general election campaign Thorpe appeared on television, attacking both the Conservative and Labour parties for supporting the Iraq War. Three years later, in 2008, he gave interviews to The Guardian and to the Journal of Liberal History. York Membery, the Liberal journal's interviewer, found Thorpe able to communicate only in a barely audible whisper, but with his brain power unimpaired. Thorpe asserted that he "still had steam in my pipes"; reviewing the current political situation, he considered the Labour prime minister Gordon Brown "dour and unimpressive", and dubbed the Conservative leader David Cameron "a phoney ... a Thatcherite trying to appear progressive". Some of Thorpe's pro-Europeanism had been eroded over the years; in his final years, he thought that the European Union had become too powerful, and insufficiently accountable.

== Final years and death ==
Thorpe's last public appearance was in 2009, at the unveiling of a bust of himself in the Grimond Room at the House of Commons. Thereafter he was confined to his home, nursed by Marion until she became too infirm. She died on 6 March 2014; Thorpe survived for nine more months, dying from complications of Parkinson's disease on 4 December, aged 85. His funeral was at St Margaret's, Westminster, on 17 December.

== Appraisal ==
Most assessments of Thorpe's career emphasise his downfall rather than his political achievements, "a fall unparalleled in British political history", according to the Daily Telegraph obituarist. While Thorpe hoped that acquittal would ensure he would be remembered primarily for his revival of Liberal fortunes in the 1960s and 1970s, the trial shattered his reputation irretrievably. The prosecuting counsel at the Old Bailey likened the case to "a tragedy of truly Greek or Shakespearian proportions—the slow but inevitable destruction of a man by the stamp of one defect."

After Thorpe's death, sympathetic commentators drew attention to his internationalism and social liberalism, highlighting his long involvement with the Anti-Apartheid Movement, his denunciations of dictators, his opposition to the death penalty, and his rejection of racism. There is wide agreement that he was an outstanding political campaigner—persuasive, witty, and warm: "his astonishing memory for faces persuaded voters that they were intimate friends ... his resourceful mind afforded quips and stunts for every occasion." A different perspective on Thorpe, quoted by Michael Bloch, was given by a former friend, the art expert David Carritt, at the time of the trial: "Self-centred ...Mildly entertaining, slightly sinister. Said to be witty, but ... if one doesn't care for impersonations, he's really a bit of a bore".

In assessing Thorpe's 10 years as party leader, Nick Clegg credited him with providing "the driving force that continued the Liberal revival that began under Jo Grimond", and Douglas Murray, writing for The Spectator, recognised his strategy of identifying and concentrating on winnable seats as the basis for the major Liberal Democrat breakthrough in the 1997 election. Dutton, in his party history, took a more qualified view, suggesting that in spite of Thorpe's bold style and charisma, "the party drifted without a sense of conviction and underlying purpose ... [and was] dominated by tactics rather than ideas". Thorpe positioned the Liberals in the "moderate centre", equidistant from Labour and Conservative, a strategy which was very successful in February 1974 when dissatisfaction with the two main parties was at its height, but which left the party's specific identity obscure, and its policies largely unknown.

The political journalist Andrew Rawnsley described Thorpe as a "dandy, exhibitionist, superb showman, shallow thinker, wit and mimic, cunning opportunist, sinister intriguer, idealistic internationalist and a man with a clandestine homosexual life". Thorpe never discussed his sexuality publicly, although throughout his political career he led a double life—responsible politician by day while, according to Murray, "by night he was not only very gay but rather carefree about being so." The writer and broadcaster Jonathan Fryer, who was a gay activist within the Liberal Party in the 1970s, maintained that in the repressive climate of the time Thorpe "couldn't have come out, even if he'd wanted to". His double standard irritated and alienated the gay Liberals: "He wanted the best of both worlds—his fun and a family."

In his review of Michael Bloch's biography, Murray writes: "Jeremy Thorpe had hoped to be remembered as a great political leader. I suppose they all do. And perhaps he will be remembered longer than many other politicians of his age or ours. But it will always be for the same thing. Jeremy, Jeremy, bang, bang, woof, woof."

== In popular media ==
In 2009 the BBC attempted to film a TV biopic of Thorpe's life, with Rupert Everett in the title role, but this was subsequently abandoned after legal threats from Thorpe. A Very English Scandal, a true crime account covering the Thorpe/Scott affair, by John Preston, was published on 5 May 2016 by Viking Press. The book was described as "a political thriller, with urgent dialogue, well-staged scenes, escalating tension and plenty of cliffhangers, especially once the trial begins". A British three-part television series, also titled A Very English Scandal, based on Preston's book, aired on the BBC in May 2018, directed by Stephen Frears, with actor Hugh Grant starring as Thorpe and Ben Whishaw as Norman Scott. Adam Macqueen's counterfactual thriller Beneath the Streets, longlisted for the 2021 Polari Prize, is a fictionalised retelling of the Thorpe affair in which the Liberal leader succeeds in killing Scott.

== Notes and references ==
=== Books ===
- Bloch, Michael (2014). Jeremy Thorpe. London: Little Brown. ISBN 9780316856850.
- Chester, Lewis; Linklater, Magnus; May, David (1979). Jeremy Thorpe: A Secret Life. London: Fontana Books. ISBN 978-0-00-635733-9.
- Chippindale, Peter; Leigh, David (1979). The Thorpe Committal. London: Arrow Books. ISBN 978-0-09-920400-8.
- Cook, Chris (1998). A Short History of the Liberal Party. Basingstoke: Macmillan Press. ISBN 978-0-333-73516-9.
- Dutton, David (2004). A History of the Liberal Party. Basingstoke: Palgrave Macmillan. ISBN 978-0-333-74656-1.
- Freeman, Simon; Penrose, Barrie (1997). Rinkagate: The Rise and Fall of Jeremy Thorpe. London: Bloomsbury Publications. ISBN 978-0-7475-3339-9.
- Heath, Edward (1998). The Course of My Life. London: Coronet Books. ISBN 978-0-340-70853-8.
- Parris, Matthew (1996). Great Parliamentary Scandals: Four Centuries of Calumny, Smear and Innuendo. London: Robson Books. ISBN 978-1-86105-061-8.
- Partington, Angela (1996). The Oxford Dictionary of Quotations (Fourth Edition). Oxford: Oxford University Press. ISBN 978-0-19-860058-9.
- Sandbrook, Dominic (2013). Seasons in the Sun: The Battle For Britain, 1974–79. London: Penguin Books. ISBN 978-0-14-103216-0.
- Thorpe, Jeremy (1999). In My Own Time. London: Politico's Publishing. ISBN 978-1-902301-21-1.
- Waugh, Auberon (1980). The Last Word. London: Michael Joseph. ISBN 978-0-7181-1799-3.
- Wilson, Harold (1979). Final Term: The Labour Government 1974–76. London: Weidenfeld and Nicolson. ISBN 978-0-7181-1860-0.
- Ziegler, Philip (2010). Edward Heath. London: Harper Press. ISBN 978-0-00-724740-0.

=== Online ===
- Astor, David; et al. (27 February 1982). "Mr Jeremy Thorpe and Amnesty". The Times. p. 5. (subscription required)
- Beaumont, Timothy (June 1997). "The Election of Jeremy Thorpe to the Liberal Leadership" (PDF). Liberal Democrat History Group Newsletter: 5–6. Archived from the original (PDF) on 4 March 2016.
- Dorey, Peter (2009). "Asking Too Much and Offering Too Little?" (PDF). Journal of Liberal History: 28–36. Archived from the original (PDF) on 24 June 2016.
- Glover, Julian (31 May 2015). "Jeremy Thorpe, 1929–2014" (PDF). Liberal Democrat History Group. Archived from the original on 24 June 2016.
- Horsnell, Michael (5 March 1982). "Thorpe quits after Amnesty protests". The Times. p. 1. (subscription required)
- Ingham, Robert (2004). "Bessell, Peter Joseph". Oxford Dictionary of National Biography (online ed.). Oxford University Press. doi:10.1093/ref:odnb/61814. (Subscription, Wikipedia Library access or UK public library membership required.)
- Landale, James (4 December 2014). "Obituary: Jeremy Thorpe". BBC News. Archived from the original on 25 September 2015.
- Membery, York (Summer 2008). "Interview: Jeremy Thorpe" (PDF). Journal of Liberal History: 23–25. Archived from the original (PDF) on 7 August 2016.
- Moore, Richard (4 December 2014). "Jeremy Thorpe: MP who revived Liberal Party fortunes". The Independent. Archived from the original on 13 August 2015.
- Murray, Douglas (5 January 2015). "The damning, shocking, depressing life of Jeremy Thorpe". The Spectator. Archived from the original on 6 August 2015.
- Rawnsley, Andrew (18 January 2015). "Jeremy Thorpe review – Michael Bloch's gripping and insightful biography". The Observer.
- Rosenbaum, Martin (6 December 2014). "Jeremy Thorpe: Was there an establishment cover-up?". BBC News. Archived from the original on 25 September 2015.
- Stratton, Allegra (28 January 2008). "Jeremy Thorpe: I remember the lot". The Guardian. Archived from the original on 16 August 2015.
- Tail, Stephen (4 December 2014). "Former Liberal leader Jeremy Thorpe dies". Liberal Democrat Voice. Archived from the original on 27 July 2015.

Parliament of the United Kingdom
Preceded by James Lindsay	Member of Parliament for North Devon; 1959–1979	Succeeded by Antony Speller
Party political offices
Preceded by Andrew Murray	Treasurer of the Liberal Party; 1966–1967	Succeeded by Len Smith
