= Angela Evans =

Angela Evans may refer to:

- Ángela Evans, Panamanian footballer
- Angela Care Evans, archaeologist and curator
- Angela Mitchell, née Evans, New Zealand netball player
