= Sutton Hoo =

Archaeological site in Suffolk, England

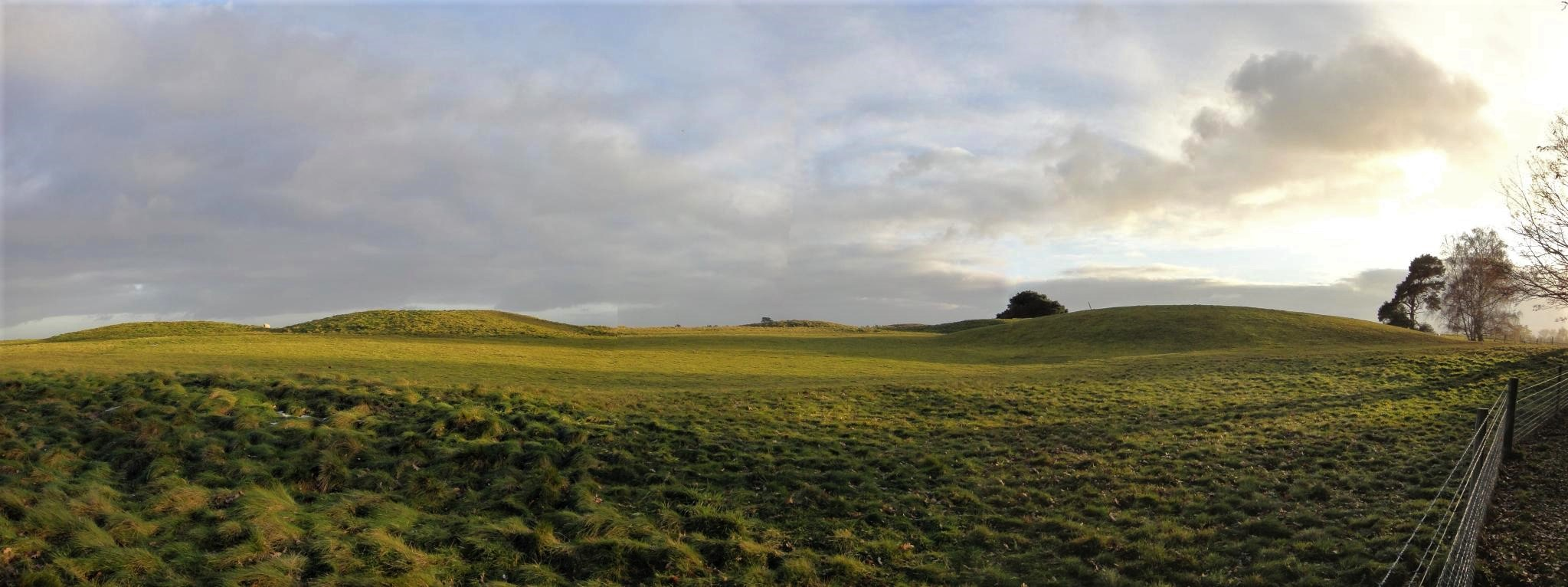
- The Sutton Hoo burial site

- Location within England
- Interactive map of Sutton Hoo
- 52°05′23″N 1°20′20″E
- Type: Two early medieval cemeteries, one with ship burial
- Location: Woodbridge, Suffolk, England
- Part of: Hereford

Site notes
- Owner: National Trust

Sutton Hoo is the site of two Anglo-Saxon cemeteries dating from the 6th to 7th centuries near Woodbridge, Suffolk, England. Archaeologists have excavated the site since the discovery of a previously undisturbed ship burial containing a wealth of artifacts in 1938. Sutton Hoo illuminates the culture of the Anglo-Saxons during a period that lacks historical documentation.

The site was first excavated by Basil Brown, a self-taught excavator, under the auspices of the landowner Edith Pretty. When its importance became apparent, national scholars took over. The artefacts found in the ship's burial chamber included a suite of dress fittings in gold and gems, a ceremonial helmet, a shield, a sword, a lyre, and silver plate from the Eastern Roman Empire. The ship burial has prompted comparisons with the world of the Old English poem Beowulf, which is in part set in Götaland in southern Sweden, a place that has archaeological parallels with some of the Sutton Hoo artefacts. Scholars believe that Rædwald, the first king of the East Angles who was an actual historical figure, is the most likely person to have been buried in the ship.

During the 1960s and 1980s, the wider area around the ship burial at Sutton Hoo was explored by archaeologists, and other burials were revealed. A second burial ground, situated on a hill-spur about 500 m (1,600 ft) upstream of the first mound, was discovered and partially explored in 2000, during preliminary work for the construction of a new tourist visitor centre. The tops of the mounds had been obliterated by agricultural activity.

The cemeteries at Sutton Hoo are located close to the estuary of the River Deben, and are in the vicinity of other archaeological sites. They appear as a group of approximately 20 earthen mounds that rise slightly above the horizon of the hill-spur when viewed from the opposite bank. The visitor centre contains original artefacts, replicas of finds and a reconstruction of the ship burial chamber. The site is in the care of the National Trust; most of the objects found there are held by the British Museum.

== Toponym ==
Sutton Hoo derives its name from Old English. Sut combined with tun means the "southern farmstead" or "settlement" and hoo refers to a hill "shaped like a heel spur". Hoo was recorded in the Domesday Book as Hoi / Hou.

== Position ==
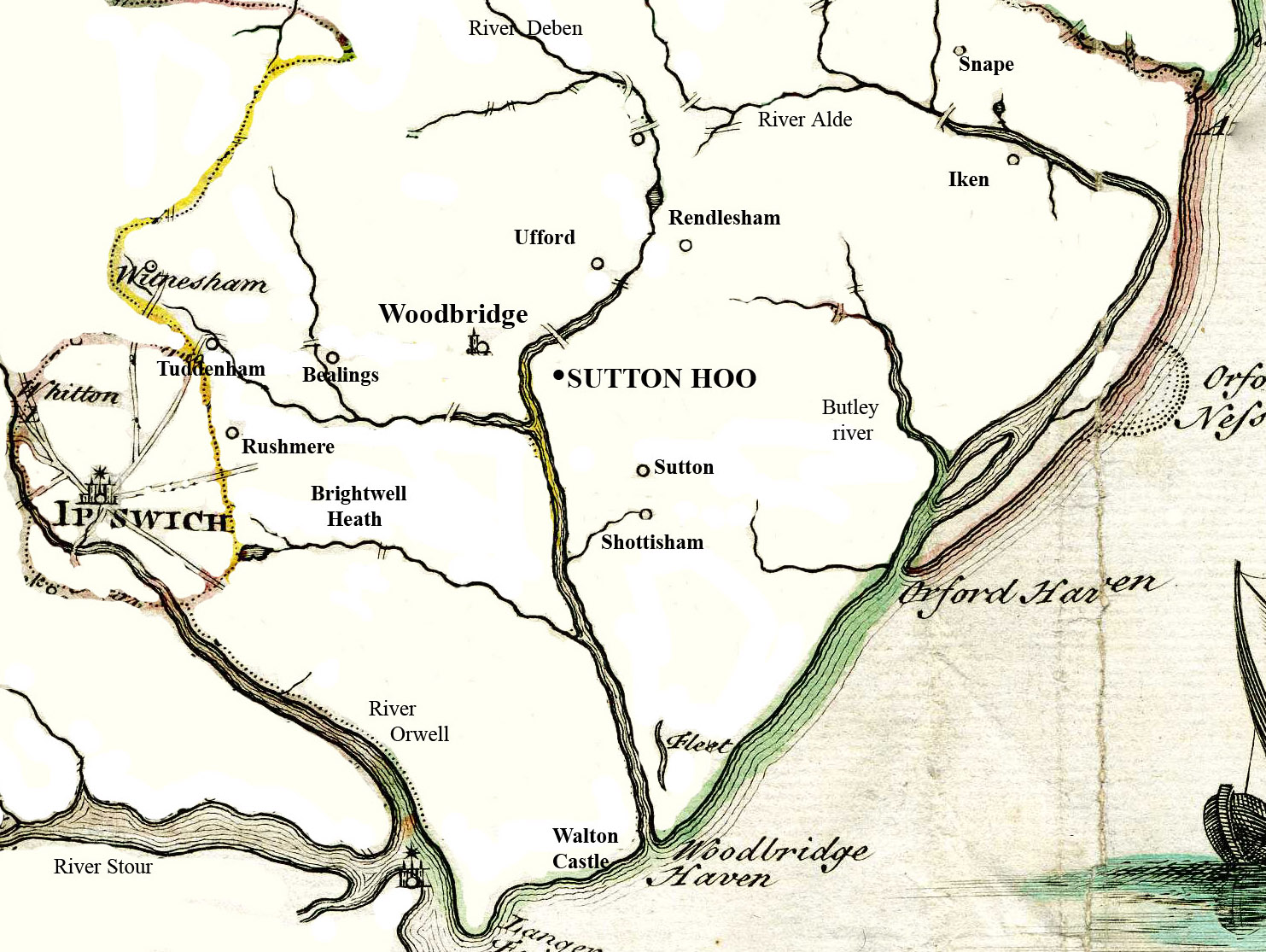
The Wicklaw region

Sutton Hoo lies along a bank of the tidal estuary of the River Deben in Suffolk, England. There, large mounds—which were originally much higher and more visible—can be seen, overlooking the upper estuary of the river. On the opposite bank, the town of Woodbridge stands 7 miles (11 km) from the North Sea and below the lowest convenient fording place. (Note: A full description of the locality and environment has been produced by Rupert Bruce-Mitford.) It formed a way into East Anglia during the period that followed the end of Roman imperial rule in Britain during the 5th century.

South of Woodbridge, there are 6th-century burial grounds at Rushmere, Little Bealings, and Tuddenham St Martin, and circling Brightwell Heath, the site of mounds that date from the Bronze Age. There are cemeteries of a similar date at Rendlesham and Ufford. The ship-burial at Snape is the only one in England that can be compared to the example at Sutton Hoo.

The territory between the River Orwell and the watersheds of the River Alde and the Deben may have been an early centre of royal power, originally centred upon Rendlesham or Sutton Hoo, and a primary component in the formation of the East Anglian kingdom. (Note: Archaeological studies of this region include the East Anglian Kingdom project and, since 1974, the Ipswich Excavation Project, undertaken for Suffolk County Council and spearheaded by Keith Wade.) In the early 7th century, Gipeswic (modern Ipswich) began its growth as a centre for foreign trade, Botolph's monastery at Iken was founded by royal grant in 654, and Bede identified Rendlesham as the site of Æthelwold's royal dwelling.

== Early settlement ==
=== Neolithic and Bronze Age ===
There is evidence that Sutton Hoo was occupied during the Neolithic period, c. 3000 BC, when woodland in the area was cleared by agriculturalists. They dug small pits that contained flint-tempered earthenware pots. Several pits were near to hollows where large trees had been uprooted: the Neolithic farmers may have associated the hollows with the pots.

During the Bronze Age, when agricultural communities living in Britain were adopting the newly introduced technology of metalworking, timber-framed roundhouses were built at Sutton Hoo, with wattle and daub walling and thatched roofs. The best surviving example contained a ring of upright posts, up to 30 centimetres (12 in) in diameter, with one pair suggesting an entrance to the south-east. In the central hearth, a faience bead had been dropped.

The farmers who dwelt in this house used decorated Beaker-style pottery, cultivated barley, oats, and wheat, and collected hazelnuts. They dug ditches that marked the surrounding grassland into sections, indicating land ownership. The acidic sandy soil eventually became leached and infertile, and it was likely that for this reason the settlement was eventually abandoned, to be replaced in the Middle Bronze Age (1500–1000 BC) by sheep or cattle, which were enclosed by wooden stakes.

=== Iron Age and Romano-British period ===
During the Iron Age, iron replaced copper and bronze as the dominant form of metal used in the British Isles. In the Middle Iron Age (around 500 BC), people living in the Sutton Hoo area began to grow crops again, dividing the land into small enclosures now known as Celtic fields. The use of narrow trenches implies grape cultivation, whilst in other places, small pockets of dark soil indicate that big cabbages may have been grown. This cultivation continued into the Romano-British period, from 43 to around 410.

Life for the Britons remained unaffected by the arrival of the Romans. Several artefacts from the period, including a few fragments of pottery and a discarded fibula, have been found. As the peoples of Western Europe were encouraged by the Empire to maximise the use of land for growing crops, the area around Sutton Hoo suffered degradation and soil loss. It was eventually abandoned and became overgrown.

== Anglo-Saxon cemetery ==
=== Background ===
The Kingdom of East Anglia during the early Anglo/Angle-Saxon period, with Sutton Hoo in the south-eastern area near to the coast

After the withdrawal of the Romans from southern Britain after 410, Germanic tribes such as the Angles and Saxons began to settle in the southeastern part of the island. East Anglia is regarded by many scholars as a region in which this settlement was particularly early and dense; the area's name derives from that of the Angles. Over time, the remnants of the pre-existing Brittonic population adopted the culture of the newcomers.

During this period, southern Britain became divided up into a number of small independent kingdoms. Several pagan cemeteries from the kingdom of the East Angles have been found, most notably at Spong Hill and Snape, where a large number of cremations and inhumations were found. Many of the graves were accompanied by grave goods, which included combs, tweezers and brooches, as well as weapons. Sacrificed animals had been placed in the graves.

At the time when the Sutton Hoo cemetery was in use, the River Deben would have formed part of a busy trading and transport network. A number of settlements grew up along the river, most of which would have been small farmsteads, although it seems likely that there was a larger administrative centre as well, where the local aristocracy held court. Archaeologists have speculated that such a centre may have existed at Rendlesham, Melton, Bromeswell or at Sutton Hoo. It has been suggested that the burial mounds used by wealthier families were later appropriated as sites for early churches. In such cases, the mounds would have been destroyed before the churches were constructed.

The Sutton Hoo grave field contained about twenty barrows; it was reserved for people who were buried individually with objects that indicated that they had exceptional wealth or prestige. It was used in this way from around 575 to 625 and contrasts with the Snape cemetery, where the ship-burial and furnished graves were added to a graveyard of buried pots containing cremated ashes.

=== The cremations and inhumations, Mounds 17 and 14 ===
Mound 17 (orange), Mound 14 (purple), inhumations (green), and cremation graves (blue) at Sutton Hoo

Martin Carver believes that the cremation burials at Sutton Hoo were "among the earliest" in the cemetery. Two were excavated in 1938. Under Mound 3 were the ashes of a man and a horse placed on a wooden trough or dugout bier, a Frankish iron-headed throwing-axe, and imported objects from the eastern Mediterranean, including the lid of a bronze ewer, part of a miniature carved plaque depicting a winged Victory, and fragments of decorated bone from a casket. Under Mound 4 were the cremated remains of a man and a woman, with a horse and perhaps also a dog, as well as fragments of bone gaming-pieces.

In Mounds 5, 6, and 7, Carver found cremations deposited in bronze bowls. In Mound 5 were found gaming-pieces, small iron shears, a cup, and an ivory box. Mound 7 also contained gaming-pieces, as well as an iron-bound bucket, a sword-belt fitting and a drinking vessel, together with the remains of horse, cattle, red deer, sheep, and pig that had been burnt with the deceased on a pyre. Mound 6 contained cremated animals, gaming-pieces, a sword-belt fitting, and a comb. The Mound 18 grave was very damaged, but of similar kind.

Two cremations were found during the 1960s exploration to define the extent of Mound 5, together with two inhumations and a pit with a skull and fragments of decorative foil. In level areas between the mounds, Carver found three furnished inhumations. One small mound held a child's remains, along with his buckle and miniature spear. A man's grave included two belt buckles and a knife, and that of a woman contained a leather bag, a pin and a chatelaine.

The most impressive of the burials without a chamber is that of a young man who was buried with his horse, in Mound 17. The horse would have been sacrificed for the funeral, in a ritual sufficiently standardised to indicate a lack of sentimental attachment to it. Two undisturbed grave-hollows existed side by side under the mound. The man's oak coffin contained his pattern welded sword on his right and his sword-belt, wrapped around the blade, which had a bronze buckle with garnet cloisonné cellwork, two pyramidal strapmounts and a scabbard-buckle.

By the man's head were a firesteel and a leather pouch, containing rough garnets and a piece of millefiori glass. Around the coffin were two spears, a shield, a small cauldron and a bronze bowl, a pot, an iron-bound bucket and some animal ribs. In the north-west corner of his grave was a bridle, mounted with circular gilt bronze plaques with interlace ornamentation. These items are on display at Sutton Hoo.

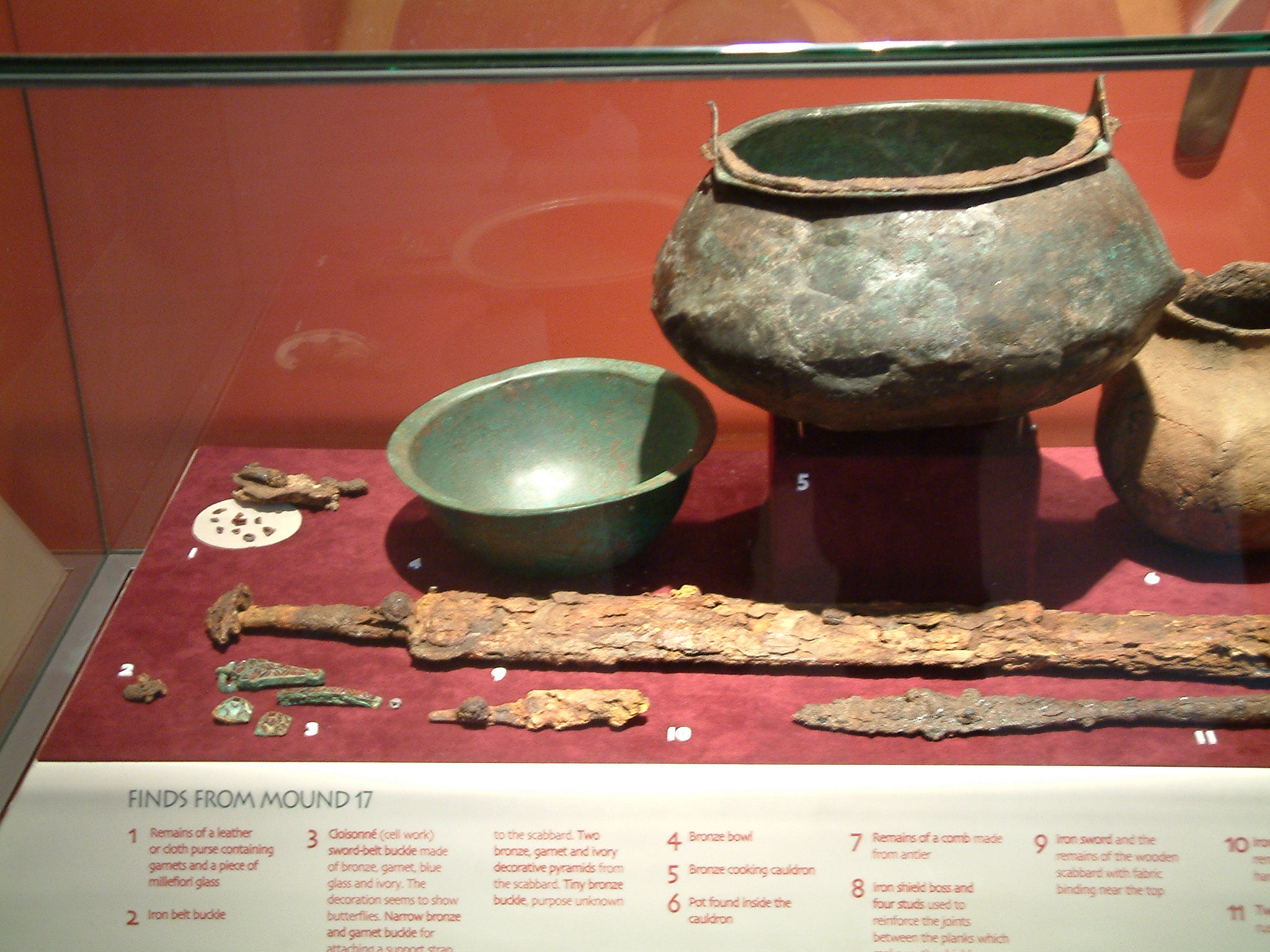
Finds from Mound 17

Inhumation graves of this kind are known from both England and Germanic continental Europe, (Note: The example from Eschwege, Niederhonen in the Lower Werra valley, a tributary of the River Weser, is displayed at Kassel Museum, Germany.) with most dating from the 6th or early 7th century. In about 1820, an example was excavated at Witnesham. There are other examples at Lakenheath in western Suffolk and in the Snape cemetery: Other examples have been inferred from records of the discovery of horse furniture at Eye and Mildenhall.

Although the grave under Mound 14 had been destroyed almost completely by robbing, apparently during a heavy rainstorm, it had contained exceptionally high-quality goods belonging to a woman. These included a chatelaine, a kidney-shaped purse-lid, a bowl, several buckles, a dress-fastener, and the hinges of a casket, all made of silver, and also a fragment of embroidered cloth.

=== Mound 2 ===
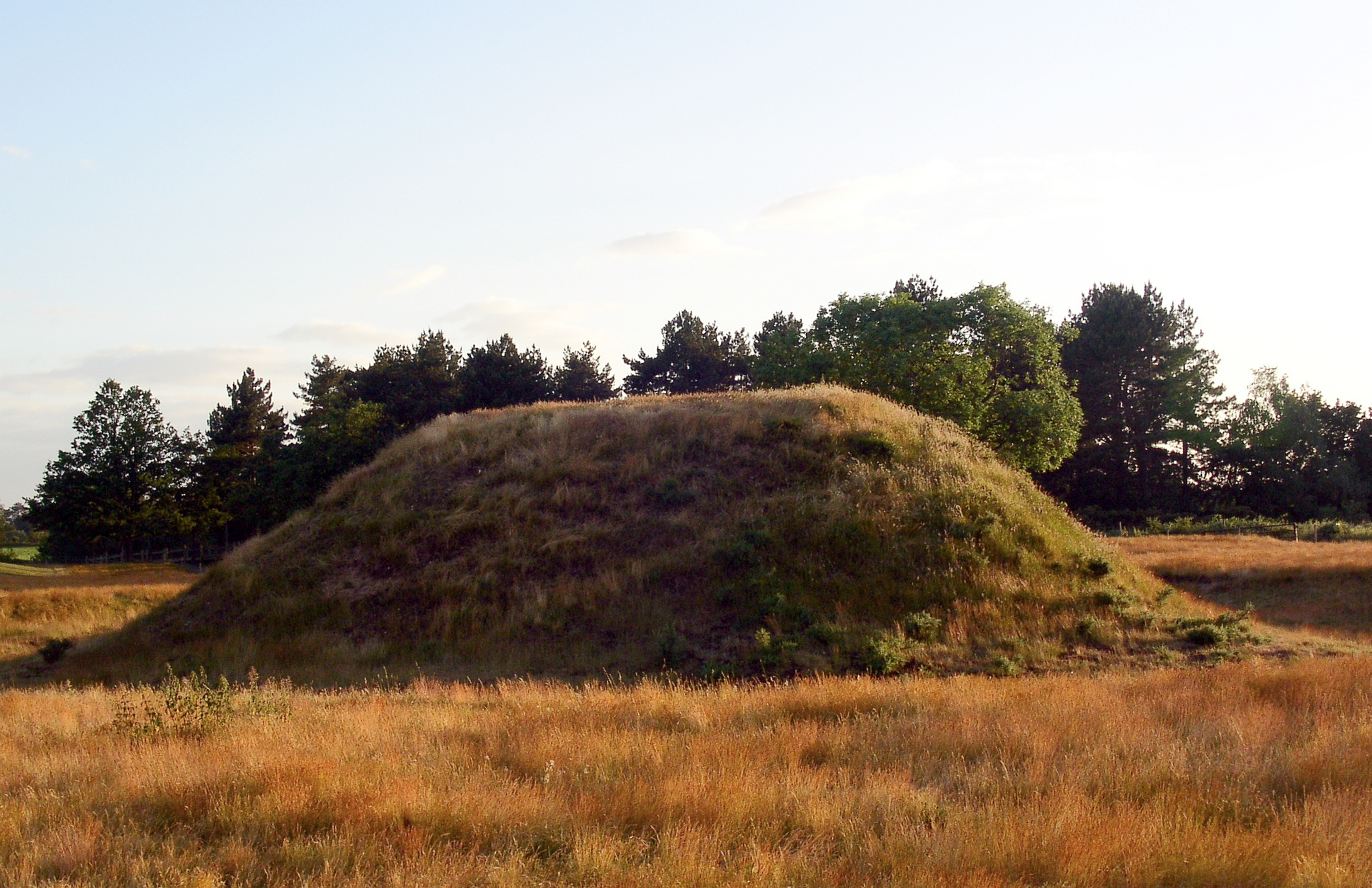
Mound 2 is the only Sutton Hoo tumulus to have been reconstructed to its estimated original height

This important grave, damaged by looters, was probably the source of the many iron ship-rivets found at Sutton Hoo in 1860. In 1938, when the mound was excavated, iron rivets were found, which enabled the Mound 2 grave to be interpreted as a small boat. Carver's re-investigation revealed that there was a rectangular plank-lined chamber, 5 metres (16 ft) long by 2 metres (6 ft 7 in) wide, sunk below the land surface, with the body and grave-goods laid out in it. A small ship had been placed over this in an east–west alignment before a large earth mound was raised.

Chemical analysis of the chamber floor has suggested the presence of a body in the south-western corner. The goods found included fragments of a blue glass cup with a trailed decoration, similar to the recent find from the Prittlewell tomb in Essex. There were two gilt-bronze discs with animal interlace ornament, a bronze brooch, a silver buckle, and a gold-coated stud from a buckle. Four objects had a special kinship with the Mound 1 finds: the tip of a sword blade showed elaborate pattern welding; silver-gilt drinking horn-mounts (struck from the same dies as those in Mound 1); and the similarity of two fragments of dragon-like mounts or plaques. Although the rituals were not identical, the association of the contents of the grave shows a connection between the two burials.

=== The execution burials ===
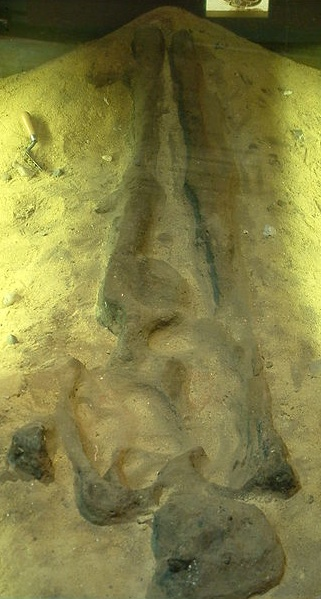
"Sand body" preserved for museum display

The cemetery contained remains of people who died violently, in some cases by hanging and decapitation. Often the bones have not survived, but the flesh had stained the sandy soil: the soil was laminated as digging progressed, so that the emaciated figures of the dead were revealed. Casts were taken of several of these.

The identification and discussion of these burials was led by Carver. Two main groups were excavated, with one arranged around Mound 5 and the other situated beyond the barrow cemetery limits in the field to the east. It is thought that a gallows once stood on Mound 5, in a prominent position near to a significant river-crossing point, and that the graves contained the bodies of criminals, possibly executed from the 8th and 9th centuries onwards.

=== The new grave field ===
In 2000, a Suffolk County Council team excavated the site intended for the National Trust's new visitor centre, north of Tranmer House, at a point where the ridge of the Deben valley veers westwards to form a promontory. When the topsoil was removed, early Anglo-Saxon burials were discovered in one corner, with some possessing high-status objects. The area had first attracted attention with the discovery of part of a 6th-century bronze vessel, of eastern Mediterranean origin, that had probably formed part of a furnished burial. The outer surface of the so-called "Bromeswell bucket" was decorated with a Syrian- or Nubian-style frieze, depicting naked warriors in combat with leaping lions, and had an inscription in Greek that translated as "Use this in good health, Master Count, for many happy years."

In an area near to a former rose garden, a group of moderate-sized burial mounds was identified. They had long since been levelled, but their position was shown by circular ditches that each enclosed a small deposit indicating the presence of a single burial, probably of unurned human ashes. One burial lay in an irregular oval pit that contained two vessels, a stamped black earthenware urn of late 6th-century type, and a well-preserved large bronze hanging bowl, with openwork hook escutcheons and a related circular mount at the centre. In another burial, a man had been laid next to his spear and covered with a shield of normal size. The shield bore an ornamented boss-stud and two fine metal mounts, ornamented with a predatory bird and a dragon-like creature.

=== Mound 1 ===
Mound 1 (in red) within the burial ground (burial mounds are coloured grey)

The ship-burial discovered under Mound 1 in 1939 contained one of the most significant archaeological finds in England. Its size and completeness, far-reaching connections, and the remarkable condition of its contents (especially given their age) generated profound public and academic interest.

==== Burial ship (Sutton Hoo ship) ====
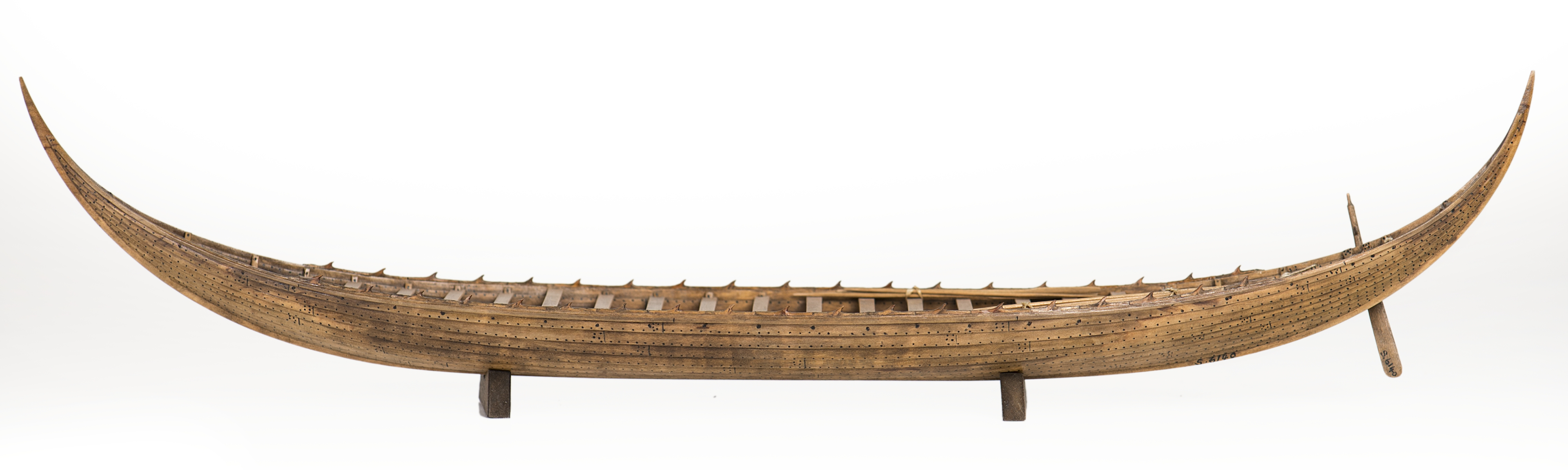
Model of the Sutton Hoo burial ship

Although practically none of the original timber survived, the form of the ship was perfectly preserved. Stains in the sand had replaced the wood but had preserved many construction details. Nearly all of the iron planking rivets were in their original places. It was possible to survey the original ship, which was found to be 27 metres (89 ft) long, pointed at either end with tall rising stem and stern posts and widening to 4.4 metres (14 ft) in the beam amidships with an inboard depth of 1.5 metres (4 ft 11 in) over the keel line.

From the keel board, the hull was constructed clinker-fashion with nine planks on either side, fastened with rivets. Twenty-six wooden ribs strengthened the form. Repairs were visible: this had been a seagoing vessel of excellent craftsmanship, but there was no descending keel. The decking, benches and mast were removed. In the fore and aft sections along the gunwales, there were oar-rests shaped like the Old English letter "thorn", indicating that there may have been positions for forty oarsmen. The central chamber had timber walls at either end and a roof, which was probably pitched.

The heavy oak vessel had been hauled from the river up the hill and lowered into a prepared trench, so only the tops of the stem and stern posts rose above the land surface. After the addition of the body and the artefacts, an oval mound was constructed, which covered the ship and rose above the horizon at the riverward side of the cemetery. The view to the river is now obscured by Top Hat Wood, but the mound would have been a visible symbol of power to those using the waterway. This appears to have been the final occasion upon which the Sutton Hoo cemetery was used for its original purpose.

Long afterwards, the roof collapsed violently under the weight of the mound, compressing the ship's contents into a seam of earth.

Using the imprint of the longship in the sand around its location, archaeologist Angela Care Evans made plans to create a full-size replica. Work began in 2021, using oak planks and iron rivets, with help from a charity, the Sutton Hoo Ship's Company. The estimated date of completion was originally set for 2024, but due to unforeseen delays, completion is now slated for 2026. The ship is expected to be fully functional. Shipwright Tim Kirk made this comment to ITV News: "it is really just a big experimental archaeology programme, [but] we're hoping to learn how the ship actually sailed". The plans called for training a crew of at least 80 rowers.

==== The body in the ship-burial ====
The presence of a platform (or a large coffin) that was about 9 feet (2.7 m) indicated that there was a body present. An iron-bound wooden bucket, an iron lamp containing beeswax, and a bottle of north continental manufacture were close by. The objects around the body indicate that it lay with the head at the west end of the wooden structure.

The man who was buried under Mound 1 cannot be identified. Artefacts near the body have been identified as regalia, pointing to its being that of a king. Most of the suggestions for the occupant are East Anglian kings because of the proximity of the royal vill of Rendlesham. Since 1940, when H.M. Chadwick first ventured that the ship-burial was probably the grave of Rædwald, Rædwald has been considered the most likely candidate. The burial of his descendants in the mound cannot currently, however, be ruled out.

From time to time, other identifications are suggested, including his sons Eorpwald, Sigeberht or Ecgric. Rædwald is favoured because of the high quality of the imported and commissioned materials and the resources needed to assemble them, the authority that the gold was intended to convey, the community involvement required to conduct the ritual at a cemetery reserved for an elite, the close proximity of Sutton Hoo to Rendlesham and the probable date horizons. Carver says Chadwick's identification was "repeatedly endorsed by other scholars for fifty years", and that Rædwald "is still the favourite candidate". As of 2019, the refurbished museum on the site states that the body is Rædwald while the British Museum just says a "King of East Anglia".

Coins dating to the 620s found at Sutton Hoo, consistent with Rædwald's recorded date of death around 624, and the idea that the wealth displayed there was consistent with his status as an overking have pointed to Rædwald. Analysis of the Merovingian coins by Gareth Williams, Curator of Early Medieval Coinage at the British Museum, has narrowed the date of the burial to 610 to 635. This makes Sigeberht, who died in 637, less likely. Rædwald is still the favourite, although Eorpwald also fits the timescale as he died 627–28.

Although this is a likely explanation, it is still controversial, as reflected in the comments in the article on Rædwald in the Oxford Dictionary of National Biography ("It has been argued, more strongly than convincingly, that Rædwald must be the man buried in Mound 1 at Sutton Hoo") and by McClure and Collins, who note that the evidence for Rædwald is "almost non-existent". Alternative suggestions as candidates include other East Anglian kings or a prestigious foreign visitor, or a wealthy status-seeker, rather than a king, though Rendlesham, a known residence of the East Anglian kings, is only 4 miles (6.4 km) away. In 2025 Helen Gittos from Oxford University argued that the body was an elite local soldier who had fought for the Byzantine Empire, probably as a member of the cavalry troops known as the Foederati.

Closer inspection of the sword hilt suggests that the occupant was left-handed, as the hilt's malleable gold pieces are worn down on the opposite side than would be expected with a right-handed owner. The unorthodox sword placement on the right side of the body supports this theory, as other Anglo Saxon burials placed the sword on the left side of the body.

As a body was not found, there was early speculation that the ship-burial was a cenotaph rather than a grave. The only sign of body being a chemical stain which could have had other origins; indeed, the site includes burials of both meat and companion animals. Further, there is a lack of shroud ties, and no clear evidence of items which might have adorned a body being left in the expected places in relation to the stain. However, more recent analysis detected phosphate in the soil – an indicator that a human body once lay at rest there. The cenotaph theory may be consistent with the transition from pagan burial to Christian burial; certainly as far as Rædwald is concerned, he could have received a Christian burial, and the mound, whether completed before or after his conversion, being used as a memorial and as symbol of the status of the Kingship of East Anglia. Soil analyses conducted in 1967 found phosphate traces, supporting the view that a body had disappeared in the acidic soil.

== The objects in the burial chamber ==
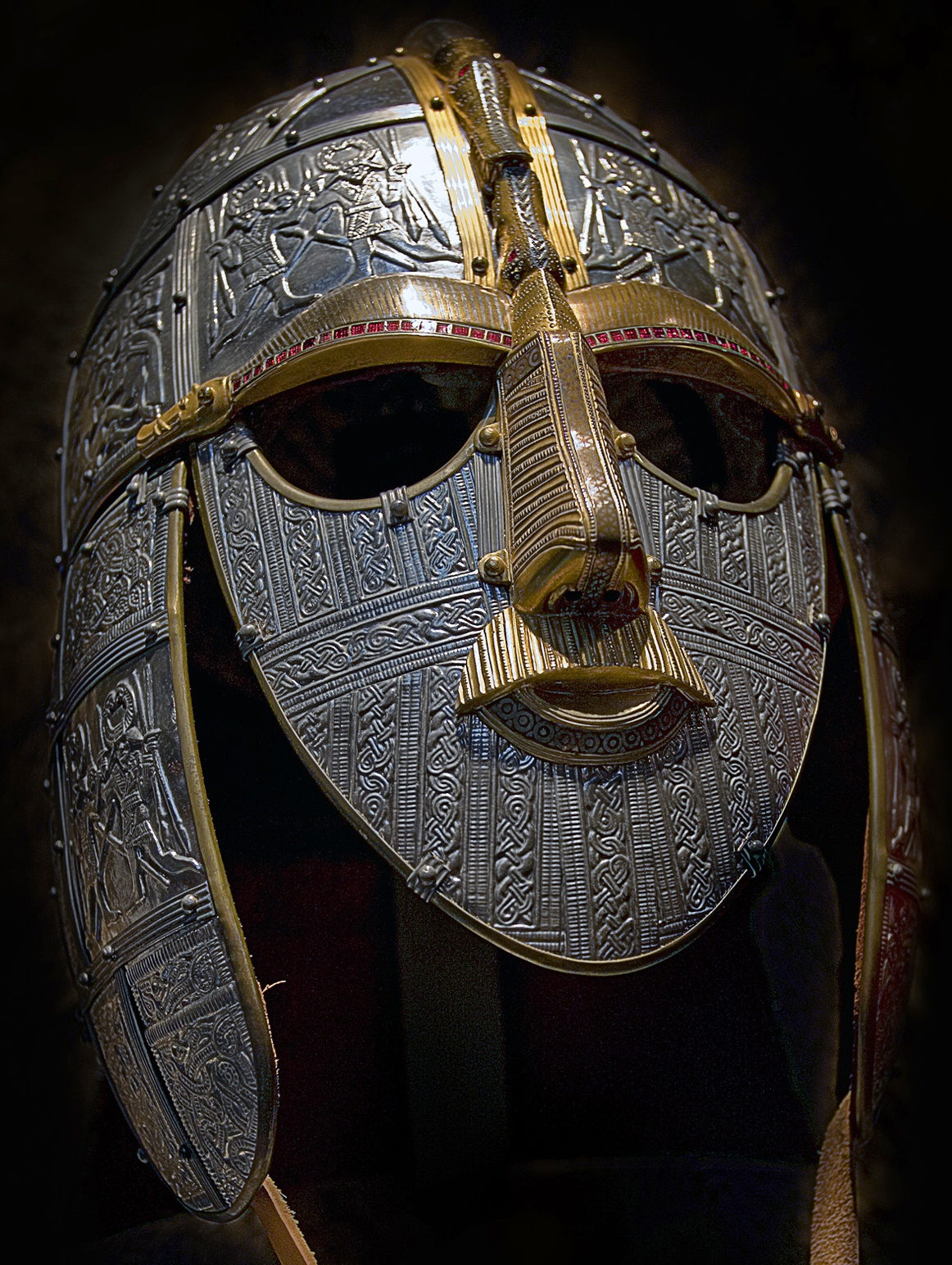
A replica of the Sutton Hoo helmet produced for the British Museum by the Royal Armouries

David M. Wilson has remarked that the metal artworks found in the Sutton Hoo graves were "work of the highest quality, not only in English but in European terms".

Sutton Hoo is a cornerstone of the study of art in Britain in the 6th–9th centuries. George D. S. Henderson has described the ship treasures as "the first proven hothouse for the incubation of the Insular style". The gold and garnet fittings show the creative fusion of earlier techniques and motifs by a master goldsmith. Insular art drew upon Irish, Pictish, Anglo-Saxon, native British and Mediterranean artistic sources: the 7th-century Book of Durrow owes as much to Pictish sculpture, British millefiori and enamelwork and Anglo-Saxon cloisonné metalwork as it does to Irish art. (Note: See also Henderson 1987; Henderson 1999, pp. 19–53, though the Pictish influences are seen by many, including David M. Wilson, as flowing the other way.) The Sutton Hoo treasures represent a continuum from pre-Christian royal accumulation of precious objects from diverse cultural sources, through to the art of gospel books, shrines and liturgical or dynastic objects.

The mound was found to contain a uniquely rich Anglo-Saxon ship-burial in the centre of which was a chamber containing grave goods including jewellery, silver bowls, drinking vessels, clothing and weaponry. In 2016, researchers at the British Museum found that lumps of bitumen or tar found in Mound 1 closely chemically matched examples from the area now in modern-day Syria. It is not clear what the tar was used for: "embalming, medicine and... water-proofing" are all possibilities.

=== The head area: the helmet, bowls and spoons ===
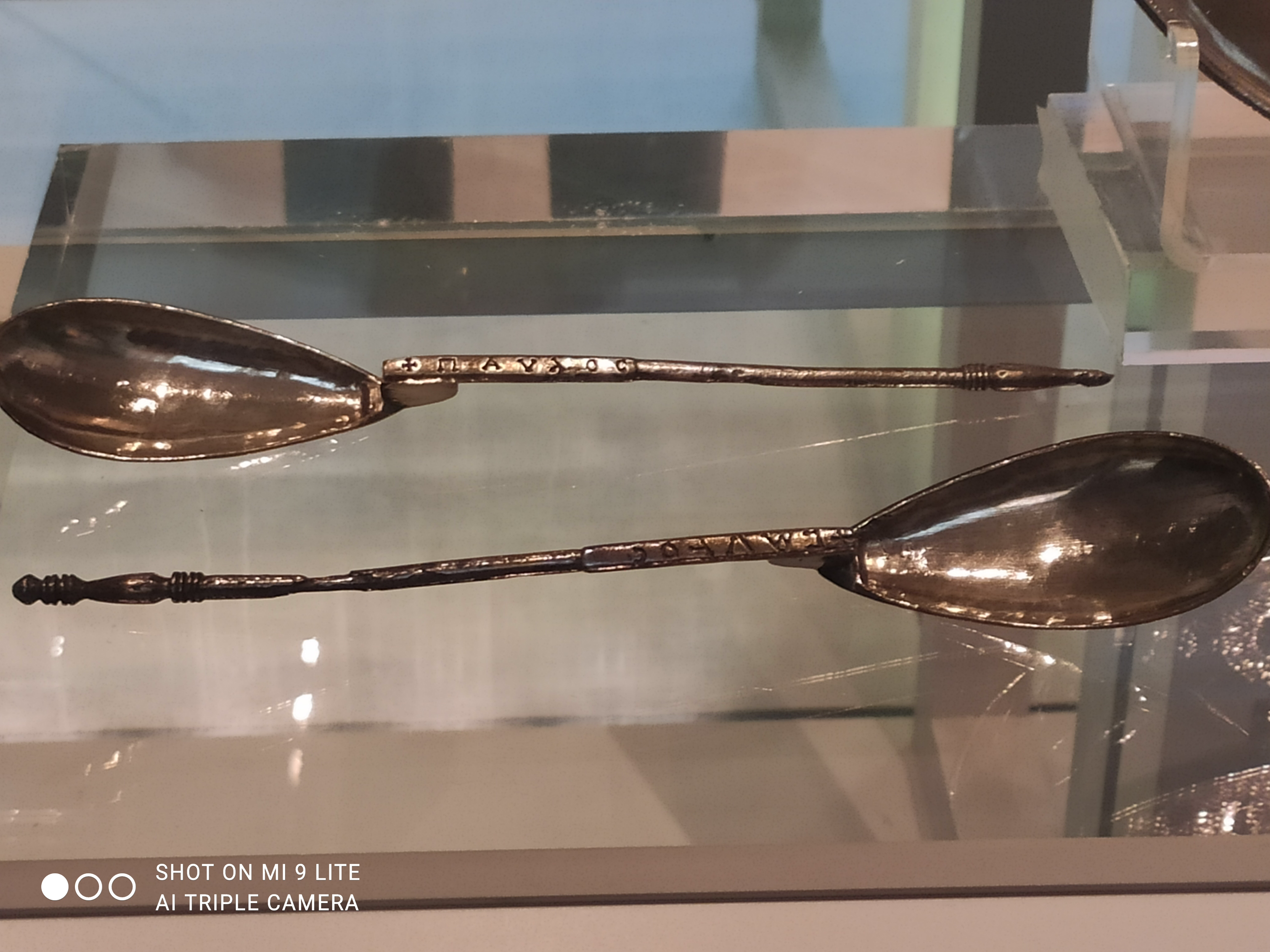
Byzantine Christening Spoons found in Sutton Hoo

On the head's left side was placed a "crested" and masked helmet wrapped in cloths. With its panels of tinned bronze and assembled mounts, the decoration is directly comparable to that found on helmets from the Vendel and Valsgärde burial sites in eastern Sweden. The Sutton Hoo helmet differs from the Swedish examples in having an iron skull of a single vaulted shell and has a full face mask, a solid neck guard and deep cheekpieces. These features have been used to suggest an English origin for the helmet's basic structure; the deep cheekpieces have parallels in the Coppergate helmet, found in York.

Although outwardly very like the Swedish examples, the Sutton Hoo helmet is a product of better craftsmanship. Helmets are extremely rare finds. No other such figural plaques were known in England, apart from a fragment from a burial at Caenby, Lincolnshire, until the 2009 discovery of the Staffordshire hoard, which contained many. The helmet rusted in the grave and was shattered into hundreds of tiny fragments when the chamber roof collapsed. These fragments were catalogued and organised so they could be reassembled. (Note: The fragments were used in 1945–1946 by Herbert Maryon to produce the reconstructed helmet that was displayed at the Festival of Britain in 1951, and were reinterpreted by Nigel Williams in 1970–1971 using materials not previously identified as well as newer methods. A replica helmet was created using these findings.)

To the head's right was placed inverted a nested set of ten silver bowls, probably made in the Eastern Empire during the sixth century. Beneath them were two silver spoons, possibly of Byzantine origin, of a type bearing names of the Apostles. One spoon is marked in original nielloed Greek lettering with the name of PAULOS, "Paul". The other, matching spoon had been modified using lettering conventions of a Frankish coin-die cutter, to read SAULOS, "Saul". One theory suggests that the spoons (and possibly also the bowls) were a baptismal gift for the buried person.

=== The weapons on the right side of the body ===
On the right of the "body" lay a set of spears, tips uppermost, including three barbed angons, with their heads thrust through a handle of the bronze bowl. Nearby was a wand with a small mount depicting a wolf. Closer to the body lay the sword with a gold and garnet cloisonné pommel 85 centimetres (33 in) long, its pattern welded blade still within its scabbard, with superlative scabbard-bosses of domed cellwork and pyramidal mounts. Attached to this and lying toward the body was the sword harness and belt, fitted with a suite of gold mounts and strap-distributors of extremely intricate garnet cellwork ornament.

=== Upper body area: purse, shoulder-clasps and great buckle ===
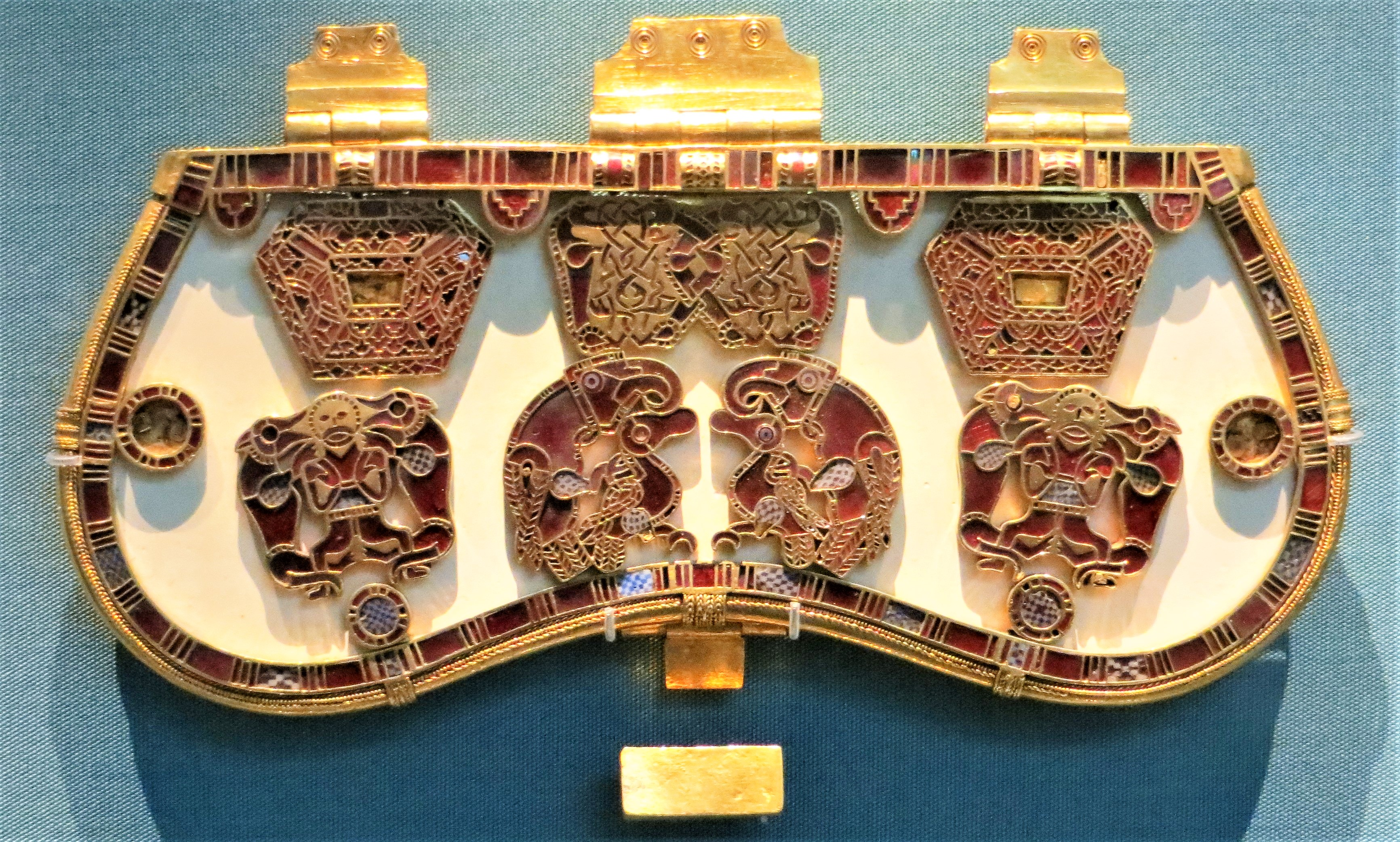
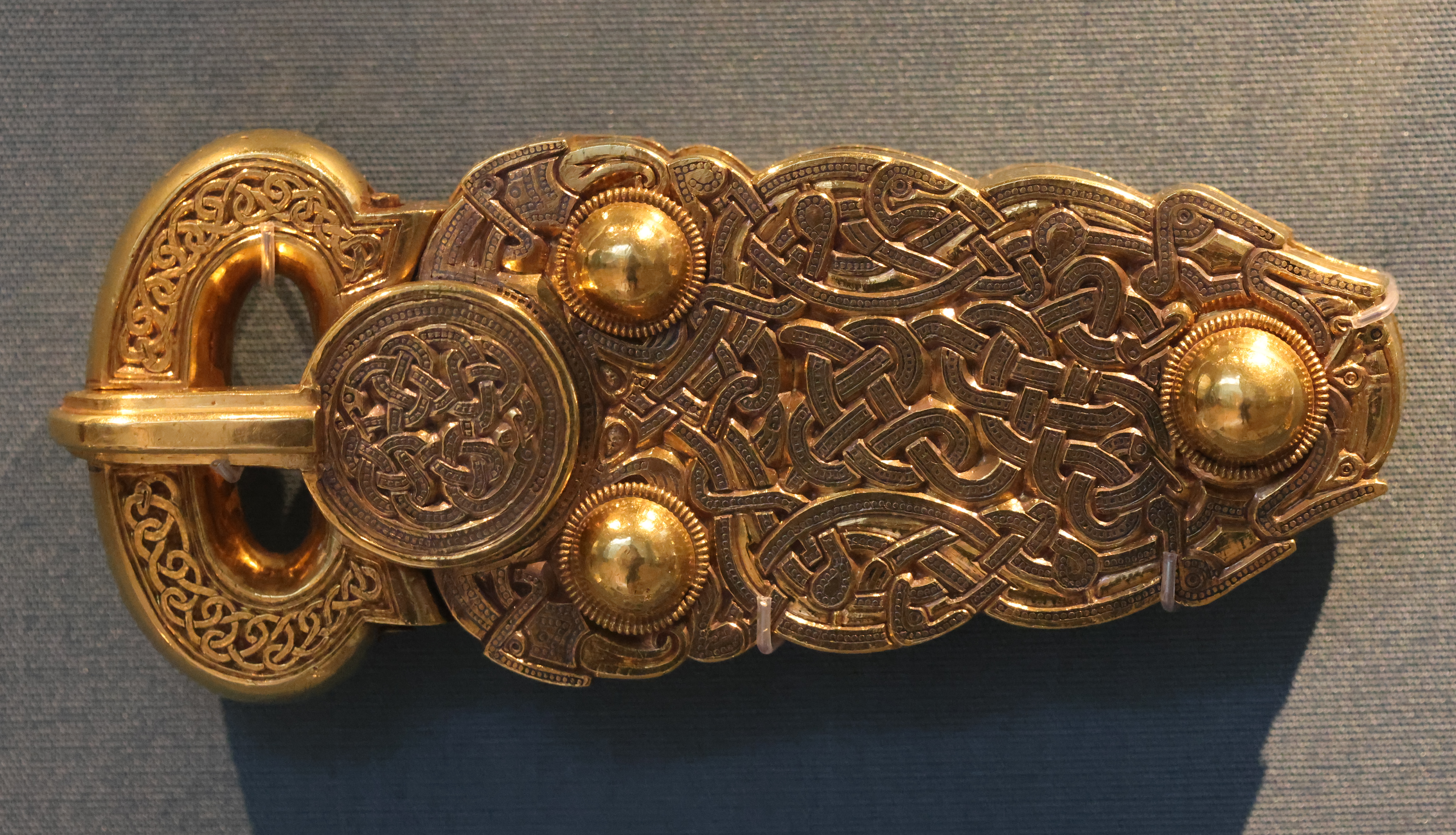
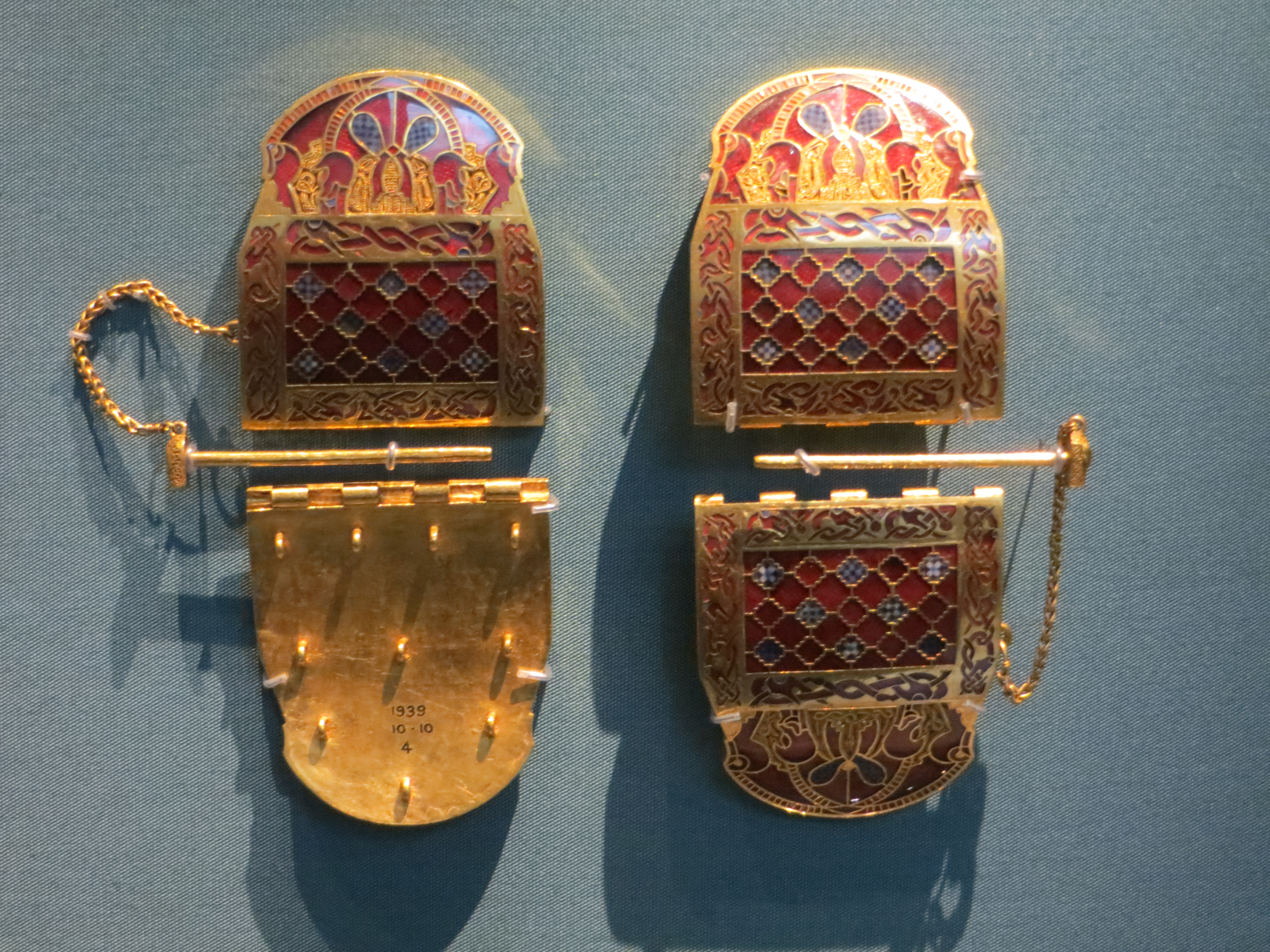
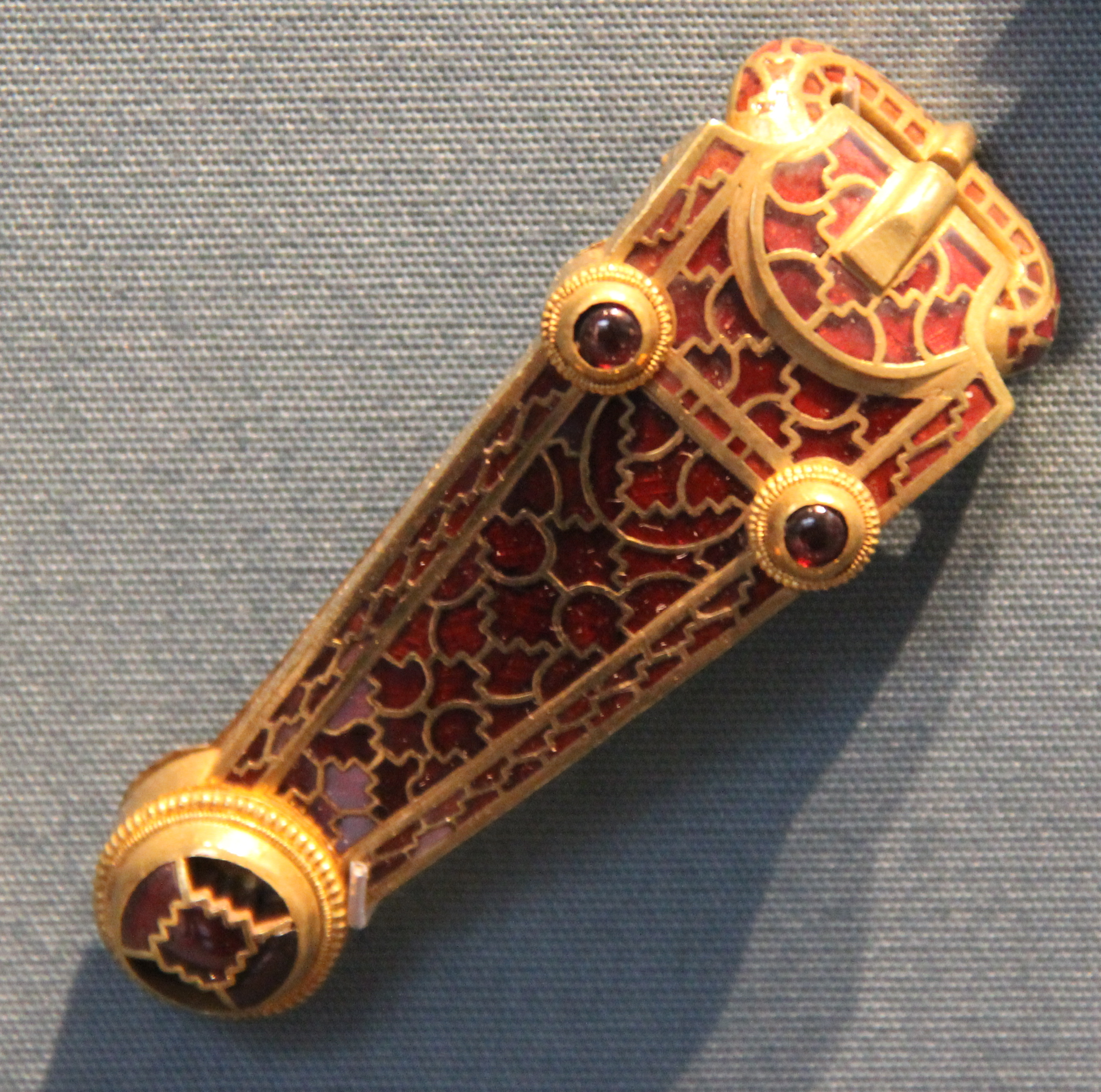
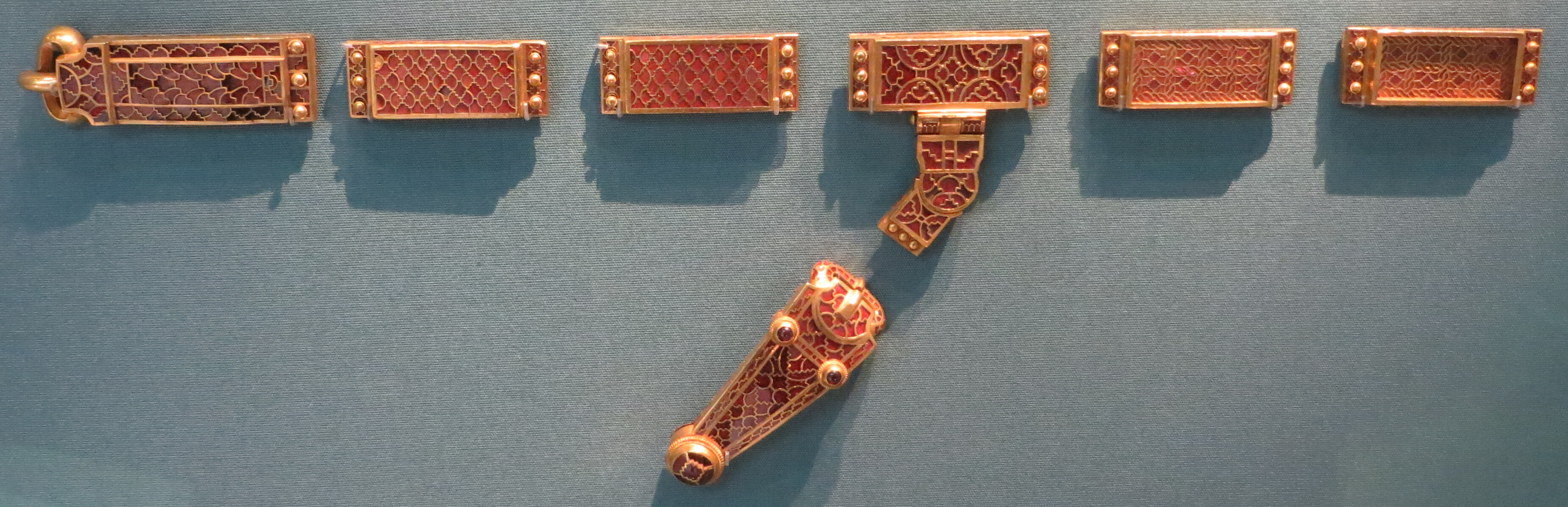
Clockwise from upper left: The purse-lid, Great Buckle, ornate gold belt, sword belt end, and the two identical shoulder-clasps from the treasure.

Together with the sword harness and scabbard mounts, the gold and garnet objects found in the upper body space are among some very elaborate objects found at Sutton Hoo.

The "great" gold buckle is made in three parts. The plate is a long ovoid of a meandering but symmetrical outline with densely interwoven and interpenetrating ribbon animals rendered in chip-carving on the front. The gold surfaces are punched to receive niello detail. The plate is hollow and has a hinged back, forming a secret chamber, possibly for a relic. Both the tongue-plate and hoop are solid, ornamented, and expertly engineered.

Each shoulder-clasp consists of two matching curved halves, hinged upon a long removable chained pin. The surfaces display panels of interlocking stepped garnets and chequer millefiori insets, surrounded by interlaced ornament of Germanic Style II ribbon animals. The half-round clasp ends contain garnet-work of interlocking wild boars with filigree surrounds. On the underside of the mounts are lugs for attachment to a stiff leather cuirass. The function of the clasps is to hold together the two halves of such armour so that it can fit the torso closely in the Roman manner. The cuirass itself, possibly worn in the grave, did not survive. No other Anglo-Saxon cuirass clasps are known.

The ornamental purse-lid, covering a lost leather pouch, hung from the waist-belt. The lid consists of a kidney-shaped cell work-frame enclosing a sheet of the horn, on which were mounted pairs of garnet cell work plaques depicting birds, wolves devouring men (or the ancient motif of the Master of Animals), geometric motifs and a double panel showing animals with interlaced extremities. The maker derived these images from the ornament of the Swedish-style helmets and shield-mounts, transferring them into the cell work medium.

These are the work of a master-goldsmith of the highest level in Europe who had access to an East Anglian armoury containing the objects used as pattern sources. As an ensemble they enabled the patron to appear imperial. (Note: That is, in the sense of the Imitatio Imperii Romanorum, not meaning an actual imperial claim.) The purse contained thirty-seven gold shillings or tremisses, each originating from a different Frankish mint. They were deliberately collected. There were also three blank coins and two small ingots. This has prompted various explanations: possibly like the Roman obolus they may have been left to pay the forty ghostly oarsmen in the afterworld or were a funeral tribute, or an expression of allegiance. They provide the primary evidence for the date of the burial, which was debatably in the third decade of the 7th century.

=== The lower body and 'heaps' areas ===
In the area corresponding to the lower legs of the body were laid out various drinking vessels, including a pair of drinking horns made from the horns of an aurochs, extinct since early medieval times. These have matching die-stamped gilt rim mounts and vandykes, of similar workmanship and design to the shield mounts, and exactly similar to the surviving horn vandykes from Mound 2. In the same area stood a set of maplewood cups with similar rim-mounts and vandykes, and a heap of folded textiles lay on the left side.

A large quantity of material including metal objects and textiles was formed into two folded or packed heaps on the east end of the central wooden structure. This included the extremely rare survival of a long coat of ring-mail, made of alternate rows of welded and riveted iron links, two hanging bowls, leather shoes, a cushion stuffed with feathers, folded objects of leather and a wooden platter. At one side of the heaps lay an iron hammer-axe with a long iron handle, possibly a weapon.

On top of the folded heaps was set a fluted silver dish with drop handles, probably made in Italy, with the relief image of a female head in late Roman style worked into the bowl. This contained a series of small burr-wood cups with rim-mounts, combs of antler, small metal knives, a small silver bowl, and various other small effects (possibly toilet equipment), and including a bone gaming-piece, thought to be the 'king piece' from a set. (Traces of bone above the head position have suggested that a gaming-board was possibly set out, as at Taplow.) Above these was a silver ladle with gilt chevron ornament, also of Mediterranean origin.

Over the whole of this, perched on top of the heaps, or their container, if there was one, lay a very large round silver platter with chased ornament, made in the Eastern Empire circa 500 and bearing the control stamps of Emperor Anastasius I (491–518). On this plate was deposited a piece of unburnt bone of uncertain derivation. The assemblage of Mediterranean silverware in the Sutton Hoo grave is unique for this period in Britain and Europe.

=== The west and east walls ===
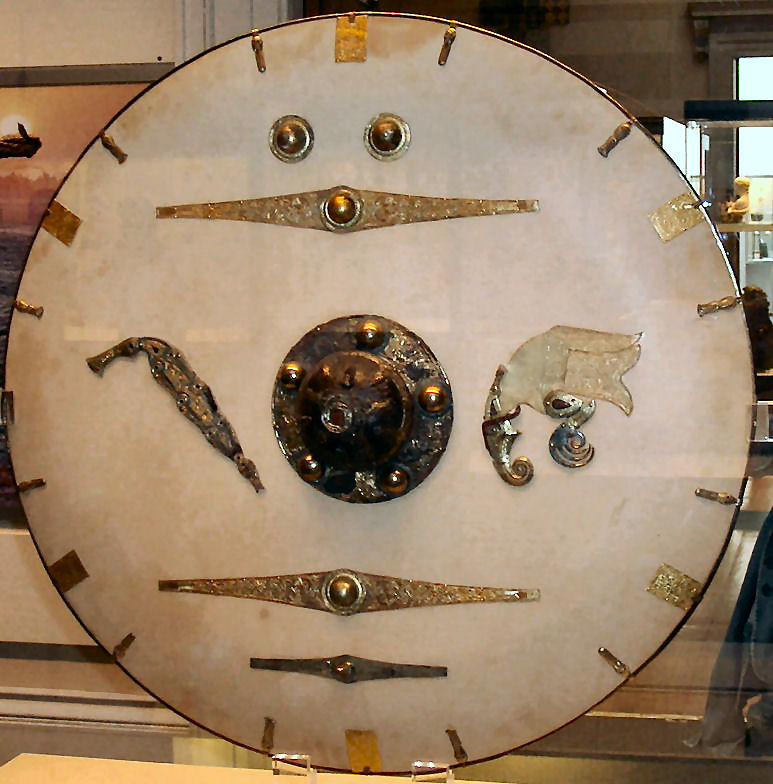
The shield-fittings reassembled

Along the inner west wall (i.e. the head end) at the north-west corner stood a tall iron stand with a grid near the top. Beside this rested a very large circular shield, with a central boss, mounted with garnets and with die-pressed plaques of interlaced animal ornament. (Note: Pressblech metal foils were impressed in a single operation using a hard die over a softer supporting surface, unlike repoussé work in which the pattern is raised manually.) The shield front displayed two large emblems with garnet settings, one a composite metal predatory bird and the other a flying dragon. It also bore animal-ornamented sheet strips directly die-linked to examples from the early cemetery at Vendel near Old Uppsala in Sweden. A small bell, possibly for an animal, lay nearby.

Along the wall was a long square-sectioned whetstone, tapered at either end and carved with human faces on each side - but which showed no sign of previous use as a tool. A ring mount, topped by a bronze antlered stag figurine, was fixed to the upper end, possibly made to resemble a late Roman consular sceptre. The purpose of the sceptre has generated considerable debate and a number of theories, some of which point to the potential religious significance of the stag. or a symbol of the office of bretwalda which would have pointed to Rædwald. South of the sceptre was an iron-bound wooden bucket, one of several in the grave.

In the south-west corner was a group of objects which may have been hung up but, when discovered, were compressed together. They included a Coptic or eastern Mediterranean bronze bowl with drop handles and figures of animals, found below a badly deformed six-stringed Anglo-Saxon lyre in a beaver-skin bag, of a Germanic type found in wealthy Anglo-Saxon and north European graves of this date. Uppermost was a large and exceptionally elaborate three-hooked hanging bowl of Insular production, with champleve enamel and millefiori mounts showing fine-line spiral ornament and red cross motifs and with an enamelled metal fish mounted to swivel on a pin within the bowl.

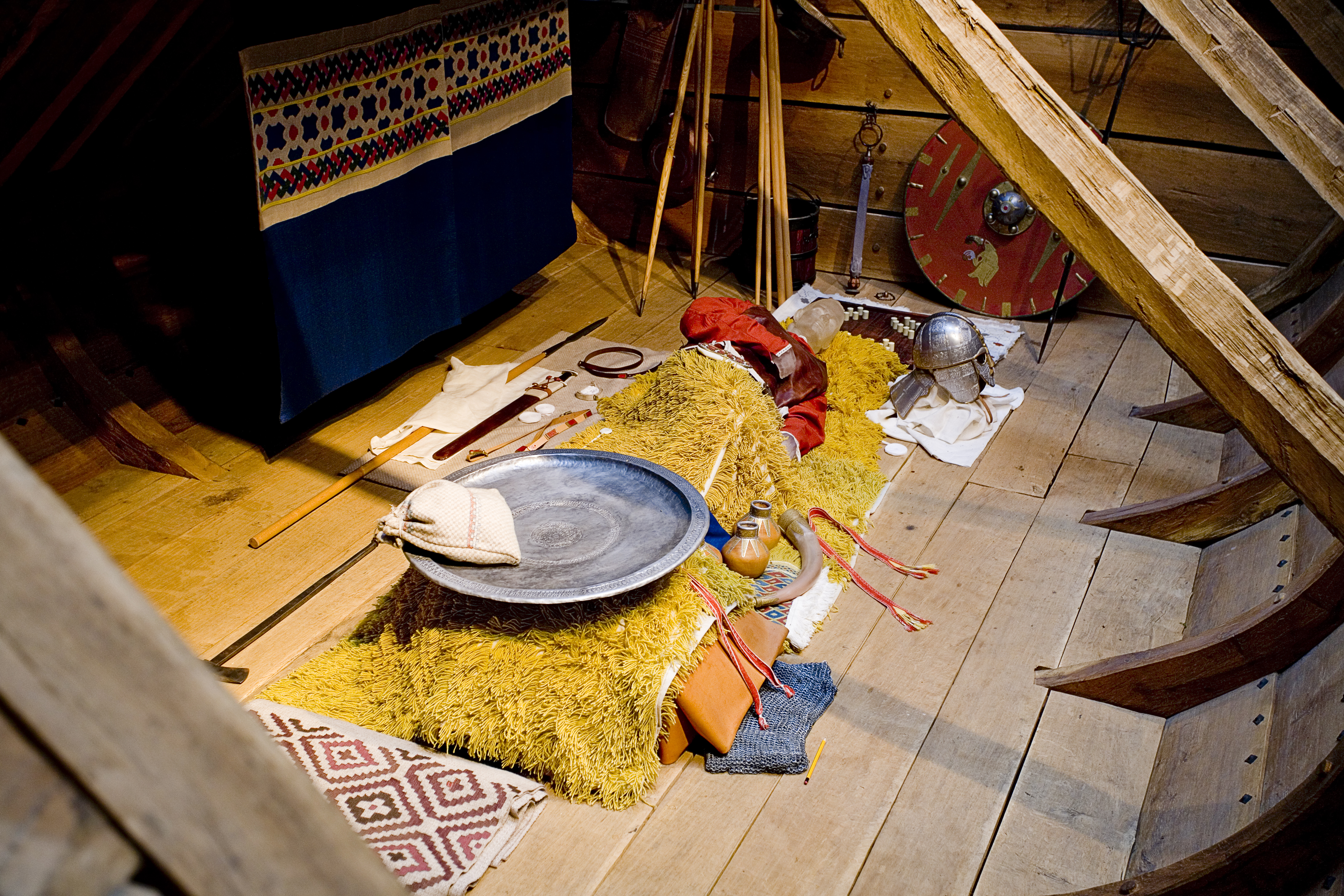
The recreated burial-ship at Sutton Hoo

At the east end of the chamber, near the north corner, stood an iron-bound tub of yew containing a smaller bucket. To the south were two small bronze cauldrons, which were probably hung against the wall. A large carinated bronze cauldron, similar to the example from a chamber-grave at Taplow, with iron mounts and two ring-handles was hung by one handle. Nearby lay an iron chain almost 3.5 metres (11 ft) long, of complex ornamental sections and wrought links, for suspending a cauldron from the beams of a large hall. The chain was the product of a British tradition dating back to pre-Roman times. All these items were of a domestic character.

=== Textiles ===
The burial chamber was evidently rich in textiles, represented by many fragments preserved, or by chemicals formed by corrosion. They included quantities of twill, possibly from cloaks, blankets or hangings, and the remains of cloaks with characteristic long-pile weaving. There appear to have been more exotic coloured hangings or spreads, including some (possibly imported) woven in stepped lozenge patterns using a Syrian technique in which the weft is looped around the warp to create a textured surface. Two other colour-patterned textiles, near the head and foot of the body area, resemble Scandinavian work of the same period.

== Comparisons ==
=== Similarities with Swedish burials ===
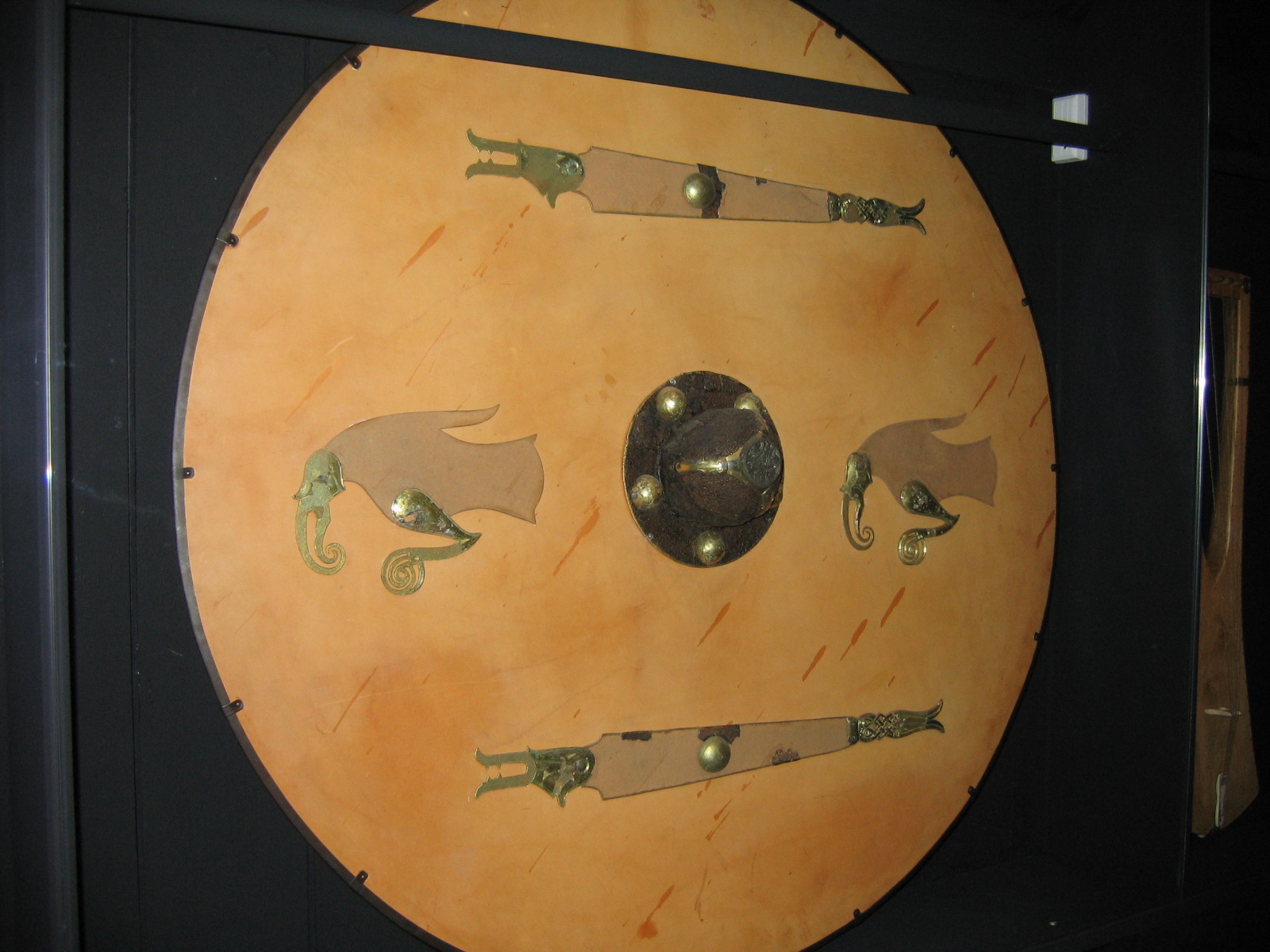
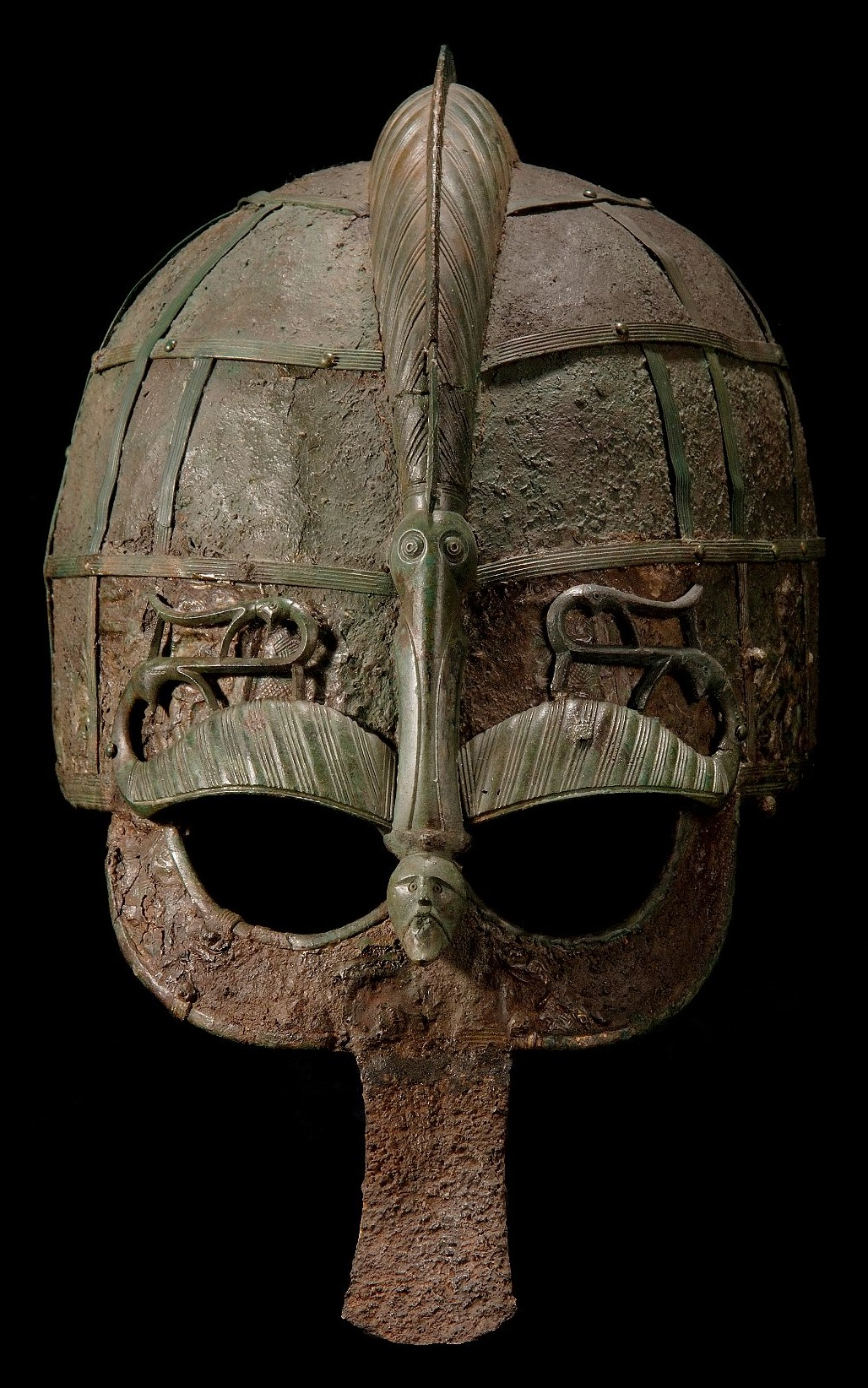
left: A Swedish shield from Vendel; right A helmet from the 7th century ship-burial at Vendel.

The strong similarities in both the armour and the burial with Vendel Period finds from Sweden have suggested a Swedish cultural influence at Sutton Hoo.

A series of excavations in 1881–83 by Hjalmar Stolpe revealed 14 graves in the village of Vendel in eastern Sweden. Several of the burials were contained in boats up to 9 metres (30 ft) long and were furnished with swords, shields, helmets and other items. Beginning in 1928, another gravefield containing princely burials was excavated at Valsgärde. The pagan custom of furnished burial may have reached a natural culmination as Christianity began to make its mark.

The Vendel and Valsgärde graves also included ships, similar artefact groups, and many sacrificed animals. Ship-burials for this period are largely confined to eastern Sweden and East Anglia. The earlier mound-burials at Old Uppsala, in the same region, have a more direct bearing on the Beowulf story, but do not contain ship-burials. The famous Gokstad and Oseberg ship-burials of Norway are of a later date.

The inclusion of drinking-horns, lyre, sword and shield, bronze and glass vessels is typical of high-status chamber-graves in England. The similar selection and arrangement of the goods in these graves indicates a conformity of household possessions and funeral customs between people of this status, with the Sutton Hoo ship-burial being a uniquely elaborated version, of exceptional quality. Unusually, Sutton Hoo included regalia and instruments of power and had direct Scandinavian connections.

A possible explanation for such connections lies in the well-attested northern custom by which the children of leading men were often raised away from home by a distinguished friend or relative. A future East Anglian king, whilst being fostered in Sweden, could have acquired high-quality objects and made contact with armourers, before returning to East Anglia to rule.

Carver argues that pagan East Anglian rulers would have responded to the growing encroachment of Roman Christendom by employing ever more elaborate cremation rituals, so expressing defiance and independence. The execution victims, if not sacrificed for the ship-burial, perhaps suffered for their dissent from the cult of Christian royalty: their executions may coincide in date with the period of Mercian hegemony over East Anglia in about 760–825.

The parallels with the Swedish burials has led some historians, such as Rupert Bruce-Mitford to put forward a Scandinavian origin for the Wuffingas dynasty, although the significant differences, and lack of exact parallels with the workmanship and style of the Sutton Hoo artefacts means the connection is generally regarded as unproven.

=== Connections with Beowulf ===
Beowulf, the Old English epic poem set in Denmark and Sweden (mostly Götaland) during the first half of the 6th century, opens with the funeral of the great Danish king, Skjöldr (a.k.a. Scyld Scefing or Shield Sheafson), in a ship laden with treasure and has other descriptions of hoards, including Beowulf's own mound-burial. Its picture of warrior life in the hall of the Danish Scylding clan, with formal mead-drinking, minstrel recitation to the lyre and the rewarding of valour with gifts, and the description of a helmet, could all be illustrated from the Sutton Hoo finds. The east Sweden connections seen in several of the Sutton Hoo artefacts reinforce the link to the world of Beowulf.

Several scholars have explained how interpretations of Sutton Hoo and Beowulf have had a bearing on the other. Roberta Frank has demonstrated that the Sutton Hoo discovery initiated an increase in appearances of 'silver' in Beowulf translations despite the absence of Old English words connoting silver in the poem.

Sam Newton draws together the Sutton Hoo and Beowulf links with the Rædwald identification. Using genealogical data, he argues that the Wuffing dynasty derived from the Geatish house of Wulfing, mentioned in both Beowulf and the poem Widsith. Possibly the oral materials from which Beowulf was assembled belonged to East Anglian royal tradition, and they and the ship-burial took shape together as heroic restatements of migration-age origins.

Christopher Brooke in The Saxon & Norman Kings (1963) gives copious notes regarding Beowulf and the Sutton Hoo treasure and relates the life of the chiefs in the literary work with the 1939 discovery of the ship-burial.

== Excavations ==
=== Before 1938 ===
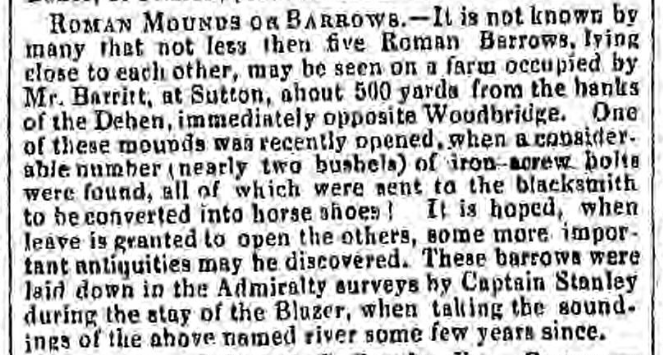
A notice in the 24 November 1860 edition of The Ipswich Journal

In medieval times the westerly end of the mound was dug away and a boundary ditch was laid out. Therefore, when looters dug into the apparent centre during the sixteenth century, they missed the real centre: nor could they have foreseen that the deposit lay very deep in the belly of a buried ship, well below the level of the land surface.

In the 16th century, a pit, dated by bottle shards left at the bottom, was dug into Mound 1, narrowly missing the burial. The area was explored extensively during the 19th century, when a small viewing platform was constructed, but no useful records were made. In 1860 it was reported that nearly two bushels of iron screw bolts, presumably ship rivets, had been found at the recent opening of a mound and that it was hoped to open others.

=== Basil Brown and Charles Phillips: 1938–1939 ===
In 1910, a mansion, Tranmer House, was built a short distance from the mounds. In 1926 the Tranmer estate was purchased by Colonel Frank Pretty, a retired military officer who had recently married. In 1934, Pretty died, leaving a widow, Edith Pretty, and young son, Robert Dempster Pretty. Following her bereavement, Edith became interested in Spiritualism, a popular religious movement that purported to enable the living to communicate with the dead.

In 1937, Pretty decided to organise an excavation of the mounds. Through the Ipswich Museum, she obtained the services of Basil Brown, a self-taught Suffolk archaeologist who had taken up full-time investigations of Roman sites for the museum. In June 1938, Pretty took him to the site, offered him accommodation and a wage of 30 shillings a week, and suggested that he start digging at Mound 1.

Because it had been disturbed by earlier grave diggers, Brown, in consultation with the Ipswich Museum, decided instead to open three smaller mounds (2, 3 and 4). These only revealed fragmented artefacts, as the mounds had been robbed of valuable items. In Mound 2 he found iron ship-rivets and a disturbed chamber burial that contained unusual fragments of metal and glass artefacts. At first, it was undecided as to whether they were Early Anglo-Saxon or Viking objects. The Ipswich Museum then became involved with the excavations; the finds became part of the museum's collection.

In May 1939, Brown began work on Mound 1, helped by Pretty's gardener John (Jack) Jacobs, her gamekeeper William Spooner, and another estate worker Bert Fuller. (Jacobs lived with his wife and their three children at Sutton Hoo House.) They drove a trench from the east end and on the third day discovered an iron rivet which Brown identified as a ship's rivet. (Note: John Jacobs described what he and Basil Brown found in a short recorded commentary which can be heard on the oral history earpieces at Sutton Hoo National Trust Exhibition Hall.) Within hours others were found still in position. The colossal size of the find became apparent. After several weeks of patiently removing earth from the ship's hull, they reached the burial chamber.

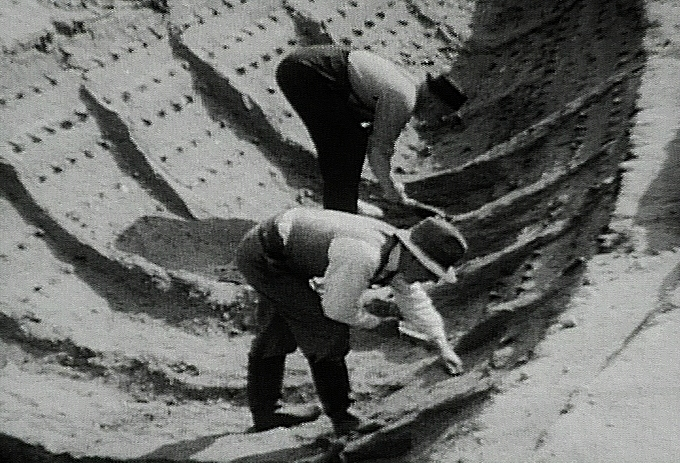
A so-called 'ghostly' image of the buried ship was revealed during excavations in 1939. The 'ghost' effect was the result of sand discoloured by the organic matter which had rotted away. Still from a film made by H. J. Phillips, brother of Charles Phillips.

The following month, Charles Phillips of Cambridge University heard rumours of a ship discovery. He was taken to Sutton Hoo by Mr Maynard, the Ipswich Museum curator, and was staggered by what he saw. Within a short time, following discussions with the Ipswich Museum, the British Museum, the Science Museum, and Office of Works, Phillips had taken over responsibility for the excavation of the burial chamber.

Initially, Phillips and the British Museum instructed Brown to cease excavating until they could get their team assembled, but he continued working, something which may have saved the site from being looted by treasure hunters. Phillips's team included W.F. Grimes and O.G.S. Crawford of the Ordnance Survey, Peggy Piggott (later known as Margaret Guido) and Stuart Piggott, and other friends and colleagues. Extensive photography of the ship excavation was made by Mercie Lack and Barbara Wagstaff.

The need for secrecy and various vested interests led to a confrontation between Phillips and the Ipswich Museum. In 1935–1936 Phillips and his friend Grahame Clark had taken control of The Prehistoric Society. Maynard, then turned his attention to developing Brown's work for the museum. Phillips, who disliked the museum's honorary president, Reid Moir, F.R.S., had now reappeared, and he deliberately excluded Moir and Maynard from the new discovery at Sutton Hoo. After Ipswich Museum prematurely announced the discovery, reporters attempted to access the site, so Pretty paid for two policemen to guard the site 24 hours a day.

The finds, having been packed and removed to London, were brought back for a treasure trove inquest held that autumn at Sutton village hall, where it was decided that since the treasure was buried without the intention to recover it, it was the property of Pretty as the landowner. Pretty decided to bequeath the treasure as a gift to the nation, so that the meaning and excitement of her discovery could be shared by everyone.

When World War II broke out in September 1939, the grave-goods were put in storage. Sutton Hoo was used as a training ground for military vehicles. Phillips and colleagues produced important publications in 1940 including a dedicated issue of Antiquity.

=== Rupert Bruce-Mitford: 1965–1971 ===
After the war ended in 1945, the Sutton Hoo artefacts were removed from storage. A team, led by Rupert Bruce-Mitford, from the British Museum's Department of British and Medieval Antiquities, determined their nature and helped to reconstruct and replicate the sceptre and helmet. They also oversaw the conservation of the artefacts, to protect them and enable them to be viewed by the public.

From analysing the data collected in 1938–39, Bruce-Mitford concluded that there were still unanswered questions. As a result of his interest in excavating previously unexplored areas of the Sutton Hoo site, a second archaeological investigation was organised. In 1965, a British Museum team began work, continuing until 1971. The ship impression was re-exposed and found to have suffered some damage, not having been back-filled after excavation in 1939.

Nevertheless, it remained sufficiently intact for a plaster cast to be taken and a fiberglass shape produced. The decision was then made to destroy the impression in order to excavate underneath. The mound was later restored to its pre-1939 appearance. The team also determined the limits of Mound 5 and investigated evidence of prehistoric activity on the original land-surface. They scientifically analysed and reconstructed some of the finds.

The three volumes of Bruce-Mitford's definitive text, The Sutton Hoo Ship-Burial, were published in 1975, 1978 and 1983.

=== Martin Carver: 1983–1992 ===
Recent excavations revealed a figure that had been rolled into a shallow grave

In 1978 a committee was formed in order to mount a third and even larger excavation at Sutton Hoo. Backed by the Society of Antiquaries of London, the committee proposed an investigation to be led by Philip Rahtz from the University of York and Rupert Bruce-Mitford, but the British Museum's reservations led to the committee deciding to collaborate with the Ashmolean Museum. The committee recognised that much had changed in archaeology since the early 1970s. The Conservatives' privatisation policies signalled a decrease in state support for such projects, whilst the emergence of post-processualism in archaeological theory moved many archaeologists toward focussing on concepts such as social change.

The Ashmolean's involvement convinced the British Museum and the Society of Antiquaries to help fund the project. In 1982, Carver was appointed to run the excavation, with a research design aimed at exploring "the politics, social organisation and ideology" of Sutton Hoo. Despite opposition by those who considered that funds available could be better used for rescue archaeology, in 1983 the project went ahead.

Carver believed in restoring the overgrown site, much of which was riddled with rabbit warrens. After the site was surveyed using new techniques, the topsoil was stripped across an area that included Mounds 2, 5, 6, 7, 17 and 18. A new map of soil patterns and intrusions was produced that showed that the mounds had been sited in relation to prehistoric and Roman enclosure patterns. Anglo-Saxon graves of execution victims were found which were determined to be younger than the primary mounds. Mound 2 was re-explored and afterwards rebuilt. Mound 17, a previously undisturbed burial, was found to contain a young man, his weapons and goods, and a separate grave for a horse. A substantial part of the gravefield was left unexcavated for the benefit of future investigators and as yet unknown scientific methods. Carver is also the chair of the Sutton Hoo Ship's Company since August 2021 which is the charity in Woodbridge that is creating a replica of the Saxon burial ship using only known tools and techniques of the time.

=== 21st century ===
Sutton Hoo, The High Hall Exhibition: Byzantine bucket (detail)

In August 2024, an excavation conducted by the National Trust and the online archaeological program Time Team unearthed more fragments of a 6th-century Byzantine bucket at Sutton Hoo. In 1986, parts of the bucket were ploughed up by a farmer, and was believed to have been a cremation vessel. These parts were reconstructed and have been on display in the Exhibition Centre at Sutton Hoo since 2002. The 2024 finds have been prepared and preserved, and as of 2026 are yet to be added to the reconstruction of the pieces found in 1986. The copper alloy bucket was decorated with a hunting scene, and was thought to have been manufactured several decades before the Sutton Hoo ship.

== Exhibition ==
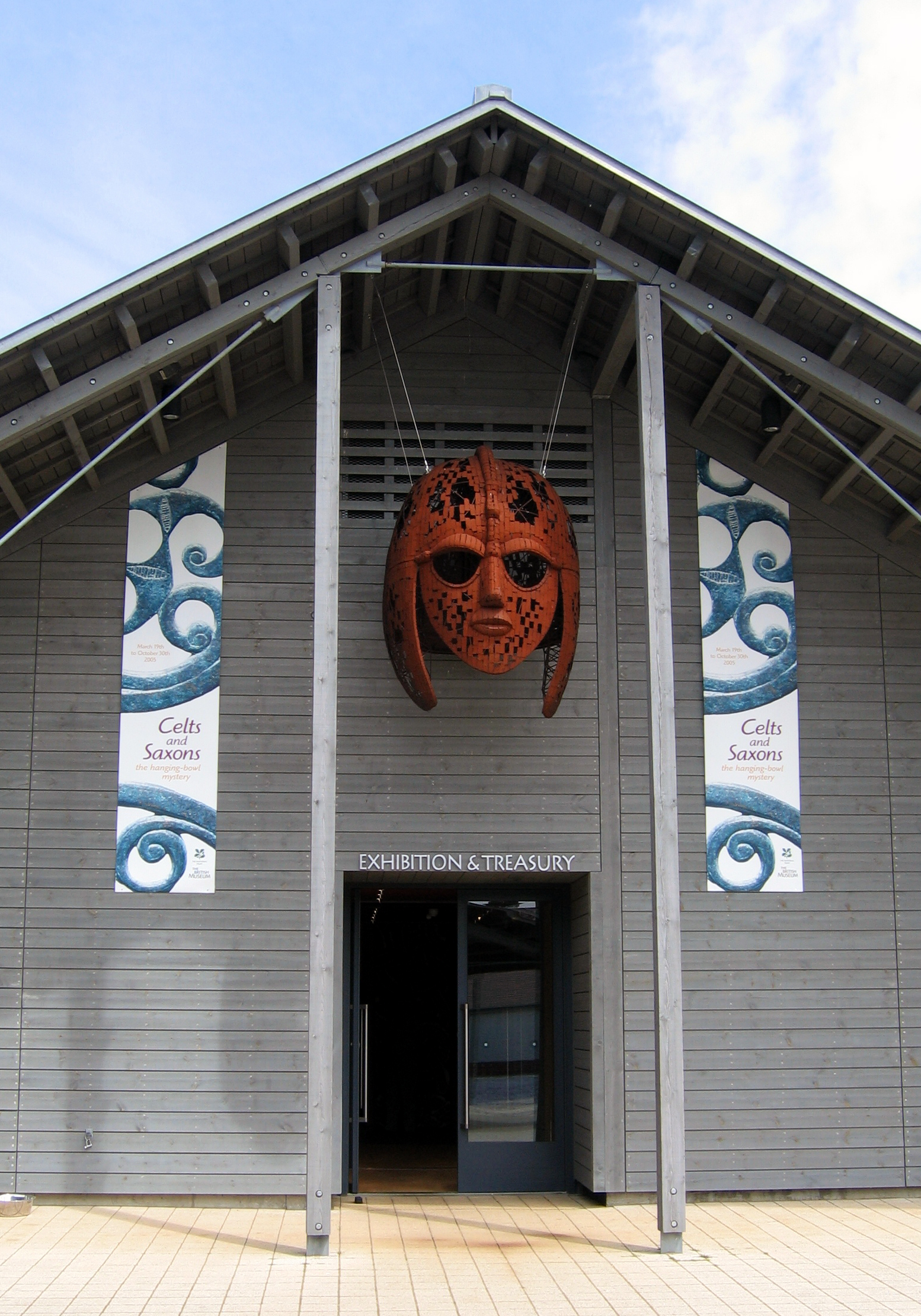
The Sutton Hoo Exhibition Hall with helmet sculpture by Rick Kirby

The ship-burial treasure was presented to the nation by the owner, Edith Pretty, and was at the time the largest gift made to the British Museum by a living donor. The principal items are now permanently on display at the British Museum. A display of the original finds excavated in 1938 from Mounds 2, 3, and 4, and replicas of the most important items from Mound 1, can be seen at the Ipswich Museum.

In the 1990s, the Sutton Hoo site, including Sutton Hoo House, was given to the National Trust by the Trustees of the Annie Tranmer Trust. At Sutton Hoo's visitor centre and Exhibition Hall, the newly found hanging bowl and the Bromeswell Bucket, finds from the equestrian grave, and a recreation of the burial chamber and its contents can be seen.

The 2001 Visitor Centre was designed by van Heyningen and Haward Architects for the National Trust. Their work included the overall planning of the estate, the design of an exhibition hall and visitor facilities, car parking and the restoration of the Edwardian house to provide additional facilities.

The £5m visitor centre was opened in March 2002 by Nobel laureate Seamus Heaney, who had published a translation of Beowulf.

== In creative media ==
- The Wuffings, a 1997 play written by Ivan Cutting and Kevin Crossley-Holland, reimagines the events leading to the Mound 1 burial. It was performed by the Eastern Angles Theatre Company at Wickham Market, 5 miles (8.0 km) north of Sutton Hoo.
- The Dig is a 2007 historical novel by John Preston, the nephew of Margaret Guido, which reimagines the events of the 1939 excavation.
  - A Netflix-produced film adaptation of the novel, starring Carey Mulligan and Ralph Fiennes, was released in January 2021. Some filming took place in the area around Sutton Hoo.
- The landscape of the site also features in the Assassin's Creed Valhalla video game released in 2020.

== See also ==
- Staffordshire Hoard
- Prittlewell royal Anglo-Saxon burial
- Must Farm

== Bibliography ==
- Arrhenius, Birgit (1983). "The chronology of the Vendel graves". In Lamm, Jan Peder & Nordstrom, Hans-Åke (eds.). Vendel Period Studies: transactions of the Boat-Grave Symposium in Stockholm, February 2–3, 1981. Studies – The Museum of National Antiquities, Stockholm. Vol. 2. Stockholm: Statens Historiska Museum. pp. 39–70. ISBN 978-91-7192-547-3.
- Bruce-Mitford, Rupert (September 1946). "Sutton Hoo Ship-Burial". East Anglian Magazine. 6 (1): 2–9, 43.
- Bruce-Mitford, Rupert (Autumn 1972). "The Sutton Hoo Helmet: A New Reconstruction". The British Museum Quarterly. XXXVI (3–4). British Museum: 120–130. doi:10.2307/4423116. JSTOR 4423116.
- Bruce-Mitford, Rupert (1974). Aspects of Anglo-Saxon Archaeology: Sutton Hoo and Other Discoveries. London: Victor Gollancz Limited. ISBN 978-0-575-01704-7.
- Bruce-Mitford, Rupert (1975). The Sutton Hoo Ship-Burial, Volume 1: Excavations, Background, the Ship, Dating and Inventory. London: British Museum Publications. ISBN 978-0-7141-1334-0.
- Bruce-Mitford, Rupert (1978). The Sutton Hoo Ship-Burial, Volume 2: Arms, Armour and Regalia. London: British Museum Publications. ISBN 978-0-7141-1331-9.
- Bruce-Mitford, Rupert (1983a). The Sutton Hoo Ship-Burial, Volume 3: Late Roman and Byzantine silver, hanging-bowls, drinking vessels, cauldrons and other containers, textiles, the lyre, pottery bottle and other items. Vol. I. London: British Museum Publications. ISBN 978-0-7141-0529-1.
- Bruce-Mitford, Rupert (1983b). The Sutton Hoo Ship-Burial, Volume 3: Late Roman and Byzantine silver, hanging-bowls, drinking vessels, cauldrons and other containers, textiles, the lyre, pottery bottle and other items. Vol. II. London: British Museum Publications. ISBN 978-0-7141-0530-7.
- Bruce-Mitford, Rupert (1986). "The Sutton Hoo Ship-Burial: Some Foreign Connections". Angli e Sassoni al di qua e al di là del mare: 26 aprile-lo maggio 1984. Settimane di studio del Centro italiano di studi sull'alto Medioevo. Vol. XXXII. Spoleto: Centro italiano di studi sull'alto Medioevo. pp. 171–210.
- Campbell, James; John, Eric; Wormald, Patrick (1991). The Anglo-Saxons. London, England; New York, N.Y., USA: Penguin Books. ISBN 978-0-14-014395-9.
- Campbell, James (1992). "The Impact of the Sutton Hoo Discovery on the Study of Anglo-Saxon History". In Kendall, Calvin B. & Wells, Peter S. (eds.). Voyage to the Other World: The Legacy of the Sutton Hoo. Medieval Cultures. Vol. 5. Minneapolis: University of Minnesota Press. pp. 79–101. ISBN 978-0-8166-2023-4. JSTOR 10.5749/j.ctttv0mr.8.
- Carver, M. O. H. (1998). Sutton Hoo: Burial Ground of Kings?. London: British Museum. ISBN 978-0-7141-0599-4.
- Carver.M.O.H. (Ed.), Bulletins of the Sutton Hoo Research Committee 1983–1993 (Boydell, Woodbridge 1993).
- Carver, Martin (2005). Sutton Hoo: A seventh-century princely burial ground and its context. London: British Museum Press. ISBN 978-0-7141-2322-6.
- Carver, Martin (2017) The Sutton Hoo Story. Encounters with Early England (Boydell Press) ISBN 978-1-78327-204-4
- Caruth, Joanna & Anderson, Sue (June 1999). "RAF Lakenheath Anglo-Saxon Cemetery". Current Archaeology. 14 (163). Current Publishing: 244–250. ISSN 0011-3212.
- Clark, Grahame (1985). "The Prehistoric Society: From East Anglia to the World". Proceedings of the Prehistoric Society. 51. Cambridge: Cambridge University Press: 1–14. doi:10.1017/S0079497X0000699X. S2CID 131148360.
- Coatsworth, Elizabeth & Pinder, Michael (2002). Hines, John & Catherine, Cubitt (eds.). The Art of the Anglo-Saxon Goldsmith: Fine Metalwork in Anglo-Saxon England, its Practice and Practitioners. Anglo-Saxon Studies. Vol. 2. Woodbridge: The Boydell Press. ISBN 978-0-85115-883-9.
- Dawson, Susan (10 October 2002). "Modest building fit for a king". The Architects' Journal. Emap Construct: 4–7. Archived from the original on 3 February 2018.
- P. du Chaillu, 1889, The Viking Age (2 Vols). London: John Murray.
- Evans, Angela Care (1986). The Sutton Hoo Ship Burial. London: British Museum Publications. ISBN 978-0-7141-0544-4.
- Evans, Angela Care (2001). "Sutton Hoo and Snape, Vendel and Valsgärde". In Hultén, Pontus & von Plessen, Marie-Louise (eds.). The true story of the Vandals. Museum Vandalorum Publications. Vol. 1. Värnamo: Museum Vandalorum. pp. 48–64. ISSN 1650-5549.
- W. Filmer-Sankey and T. Pestell, Snape Anglo-Saxon Cemetery: Excavations and Surveys 1824–1992 (East Anglian Archaeology 95, Suffolk County Council 2001).
- Gittos, Helen (December 2024). "Sutton Hoo and Syria: The Anglo-Saxons Who Served in the Byzantine Army?". The English Historical Review. 139 (601): 1323–1358. doi:10.1093/ehr/ceae213. "I am arguing that it is likely that the men buried in the princely burials at Prittlewell and Sutton Hoo mound 1 served, with a group of their contemporaries, as cavalry soldiers in the Foederati recruited by Tiberius in 575 in the wars with the Sasanians on the eastern front."
- S. Heaney, Beowulf (Faber 1999).
- Henderson, George D. S. (1987). From Durrow to Kells: the Insular gospel-books 650–800. London: Thames & Hudson. ISBN 978-0-500-23474-7.
- Henderson, George D. S. (1999). Vision and Image in Early Christian England. Cambridge: Cambridge University Press. ISBN 978-0-521-55130-4.
- Henderson, George D. S. & Henderson, Isabel (2004). The Art of the Picts: Sculpture and Metalwork in Early Medieval Scotland. London: Thames & Hudson. ISBN 978-0-500-23807-3.
- Hilts, Carly (October 2019). "What's New at Sutton Hoo?". Current Archaeology (355). London, UK: Current Publishing.
- Higham, Nicholas John; Ryan, Martin J. (2013). The Anglo-Saxon world. New Haven: Yale University Press. ISBN 978-0-300-12534-4.
- Hoppitt, Rosemary (1985). "Sutton Hoo 1860" (PDF). Proceedings of the Suffolk Institute of Archaeology. XXXVI (1). Ipswich: Society of Antiquaries of London: 41–42. Archived (PDF) from the original on 29 February 2016.
- Hoppitt, Rosemary (2001). "'I have a little something that might be of interest to you...': a home movie of the 1939 excavation Sutton Hoo surfaces in Vancouver" (PDF). Saxon (34): 1. Archived (PDF) from the original on 27 December 2021.
- Mango, Marlia Mundell; Mango, Cyril; Evans, Angela Care & Hughes, Michael (June 1989). "A 6th century Mediterranean bucket from Bromeswell parish, Suffolk". Antiquity. 63 (239): 295–311. doi:10.1017/S0003598X00076018. S2CID 163244493.
- Markham, Robert A. D. (2002). Sutton Hoo: through the rear view mirror, 1937–1942. Woodbridge: Sutton Hoo Society. ISBN 978-0-9543453-0-3.
- Martin-Clarke, D. Elizabeth (1947). Culture in Early Anglo-Saxon England. Baltimore: Johns Hopkins Press.
- Newton, Sam (1993). The Origins of Beowulf and the Pre-Viking Kingdom of East Anglia. Cambridge: D. S. Brewer. ISBN 978-0-85991-361-4.
- Phillips, Charles W. (April 1940). "The Excavation of the Sutton Hoo Ship-burial". The Antiquaries Journal. XX (2). Society of Antiquaries of London: 149–202. doi:10.1017/S0003581500009677. S2CID 162872963.
- C.W. Phillips, T.D. Kendrick, E. Kitzinger, O.G.S. Crawford, W.F. Grimes and H.M. Chadwick, The Sutton Hoo Ship-Burial (Antiquity, March 1940).
- Phillips, Charles W. (1987). My Life in Archaeology. Gloucester: Alan Sutton. ISBN 978-0-86299-362-7.
- Plunkett, Steven J. (1998). "1: ROOTS" (PDF). The Suffolk Institute of Archaeology: Its Life, Times and Members. XXXIX (2). Ipswich: Society of Antiquaries of London: 165–207. Archived (PDF) from the original on 28 July 2024.
- Plunkett, Steven J. (2001). "Items from the Ship-Burial at Sutton Hoo, Suffolk". In Hultén, Pontus & von Plessen, Marie-Louise (eds.). The true story of the Vandals. Museum Vandalorum Publications. Vol. 1. Värnamo: Museum Vandalorum. pp. 65–75. ISSN 1650-5549.
- S.J. Plunkett, Sutton Hoo, Suffolk Site guidebook (The National Trust, London 2002).
- Plunkett, Steven J. (2005). Suffolk in Anglo-Saxon Times. Stroud: Tempus. ISBN 978-0-7524-3139-0.
- "Roman Mounds or Barrows". Woodbridge. The Ipswich Journal. No. 6, 342. Ipswich. 24 November 1860. p. 5.
- Stolpe, Hjalmar & Arne, T. J. (1927). La Nécropole De Vendel. Stockholm: Akademiens Förlag.
- "New Sutton Hoo research links Anglo-Saxons to Byzantine military campaigns in Syria". University of Oxford. 22 January 2025.
- Wade, Keith (2001). "Gipeswic – East Anglia's first economic capital, 600–1066". In Salmon, Neil & Malster, Robert (eds.). Ipswich from the First to the Third Millennium: Papers from an Ipswich Society Symposium. Ipswich: Ipswich Society. pp. 1–6. ISBN 978-0-9507328-1-7.
- West, Stanley E. (1998). Aspects of Anglo-Saxon Archaeology: Sutton Hoo and Other Discoveries (PDF). East Anglian Archaeology (Report). Ipswich: Suffolk County Council. ISBN 978-0-86055-246-8. Archived (PDF) from the original on 11 July 2021.
- West, Stanley E.; Scarfe, Norman & Cramp, Rosemary (1984). "Iken, St Botolph, and the Coming of East Anglian Christianity" (PDF). Proceedings of the Suffolk Institute of Archaeology. XXXV (4). Ipswich: Society of Antiquaries of London: 279–301. Archived (PDF) from the original on 19 February 2016.
- Williams, Nigel (1992). "The Sutton Hoo Helmet". In Oddy, William Andrew (ed.). The Art of the Conservator. London: British Museum Press. pp. 73–88. ISBN 978-0-7141-2056-0.
- Wilson, David M. (1984). Anglo-Saxon Art: From The Seventh Century To The Norman Conquest. London: Thames and Hudson. ISBN 978-0-500-23392-4.
- Oxford Dictionary of National Biography: Basil J.W. Brown, Rupert L.S. Bruce-Mitford, Charles W. Phillips.
