= Angela Care Evans =

British archaeologist

Angela Care Evans, FSA, is an archaeologist and former Curator in the department of Britain, Europe, and Prehistory at the British Museum. She has published extensively on the Sutton Hoo Mound 1 artefacts and early medieval metalwork.

== Expertise ==
Care Evans is an expert in early medieval English archaeology and material culture, especially the Sutton Hoo burial, metalwork including brooches and horse harnesses, and shipbuilding.

In 1983 she co-authored with Rupert Bruce Mitford volume three of the British Museum's guides to the Sutton Hoo excavations and artefacts.

In 1986 she published the second edition of The Sutton Hoo Ship Burial, the mass-market publication by the British Museum about the Sutton Hoo artefacts, which condensed the four volumes by Bruce Mitford, and later Bruce Mitford and Care Evans, into a single book suitable for general interest. Another edition was issued in 1994. Care Evans is careful in the book to discuss arguments for and against Rædwald as the person buried in Mound 1 at Sutton Hoo, and she proposes that the artefacts are treated as 'art' rather than 'regalia', as the notion of royalty in early medieval England does not exactly align with modern royalty.

In her 1999 article "In Debt to the Amateurs", Care Evans discussed how the photographs of Sutton Hoo taken in 1939 by Mercie Lack ARPS and Barbara Wagstaff ARPS have importantly shaped the reception and understanding of the archaeological site: with the images of the 'ghost ship' acquired by the Woodbridge, Ipswich and British Museum, and entering into the visual culture of early medieval historiography.

In 2005 she co-authored Sutton Hoo: A Seventh-century Princely Burial Ground and Its Context with archaeologist Martin Carver for the British Museum Press. Care Evans specifically wrote about the Mound 1 bridle with gilt bronze plaques and interlace ornamentation. In October 2008 she and Carver hosted the Sutton Hoo Society's annual conference 'Arts and Crafts in the Mead Hall'.

She has appeared in ITV, Channel 4, and BBC television programmes as a specialist on the Sutton Hoo ship burial, including Time Team (2002) and Masterpieces of the British Museum (2006).

Care Evans continues to give lectures and seminars on early medieval topics.

== Selected publications ==
- Bruce-Mitford, Rupert, and Angela Care Evans (1983) The Sutton Hoo ship-burial, Vol. 3 (London: British Museum publications).
- Evans, Angela Care (1986). The Sutton Hoo Ship Burial. London: British Museum Publications. ISBN 978-0-7141-0544-4.
- Evans, Angela Care (1999). "In Debt to the Amateurs: the photographs of Miss Lack ARPS and Miss Wagstaff ARPS", Saxon, Sutton Hoo Society publications.
- Evans, Angela Care (2001). "Sutton Hoo and Snape, Vendel and Valsgärde". In Hultén, Pontus & von Plessen, Marie-Louise (eds.). The true story of the Vandals. Museum Vandalorum Publications. 1. Värnamo: Museum Vandalorum. pp. 48–64. ISSN 1650-5549.
- Evans, Angela Care (November–December 2002). "The Sutton Hoo Visitor Centre" (PDF). Minerva. 13 (6). Jerome M. Eisenberg: 40–42. ISSN 0957-7718.
- M. O. H. Carver and Angela Care Evans, Sutton Hoo: A Seventh-century Princely Burial Ground and Its Context (London: British Museum publications, 2005)
