= Sutton Hoo purse-lid =

Anglo-Saxon archaeological object found in Suffolk, England

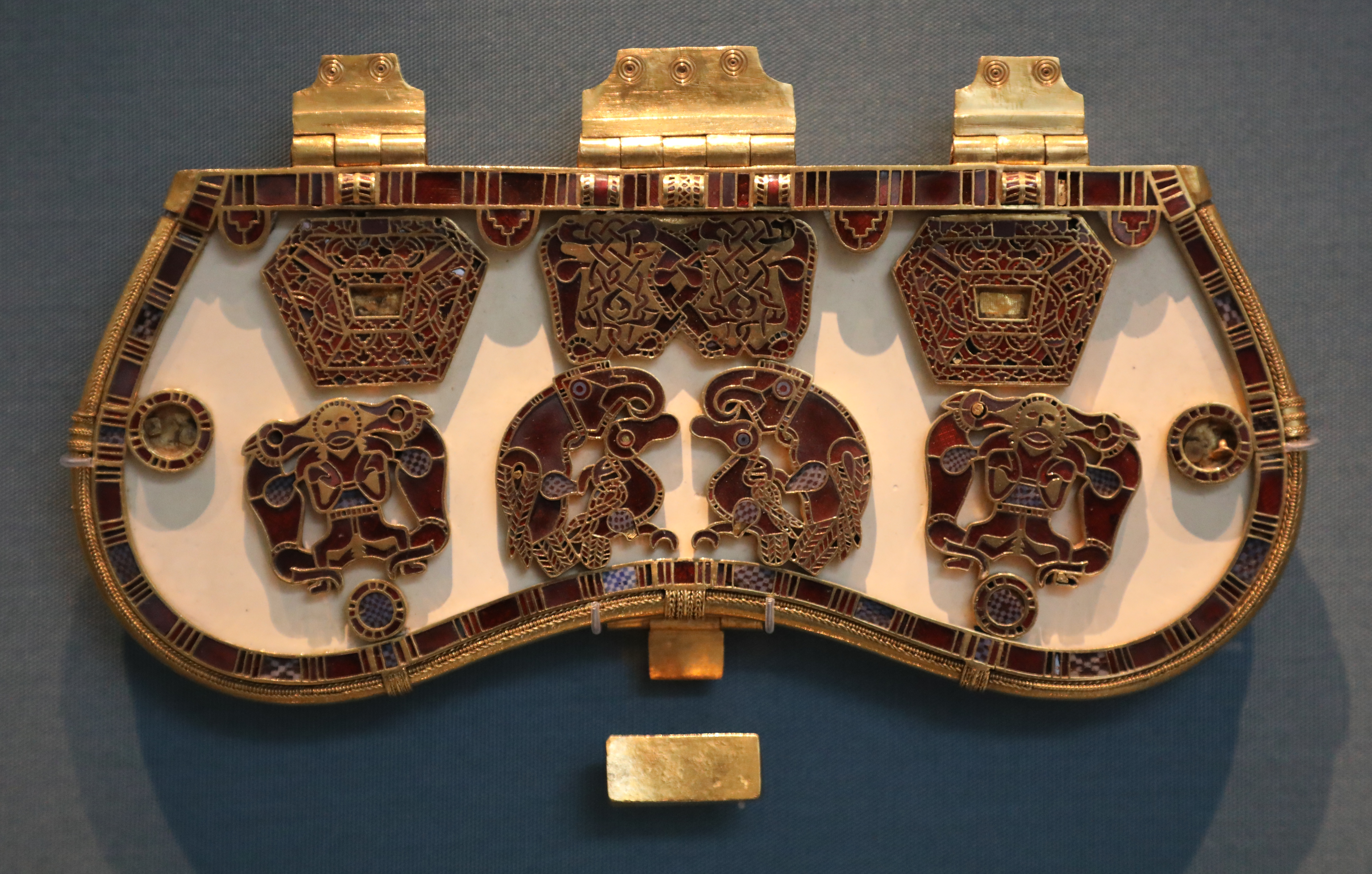
Sutton Hoo purse-lid

The Sutton Hoo purse-lid is one of the major objects excavated from the Anglo-Saxon royal burial-ground at Sutton Hoo in Suffolk, England. The site contains a collection of burial mounds, of which much the most significant is the undisturbed ship burial in Mound 1 containing very rich grave goods including the purse-lid. The person buried in Mound 1 is usually thought to have been Rædwald, King of East Anglia, who died around 624. The purse-lid is considered to be "one of the most remarkable creations of the early medieval period." About seven and a half inches long, it is decorated with beautiful ornament in gold and garnet cloisonné enamel, and was undoubtedly a symbol of great wealth and status. In 2017 the purse-lid was on display at the British Museum.

== Background ==
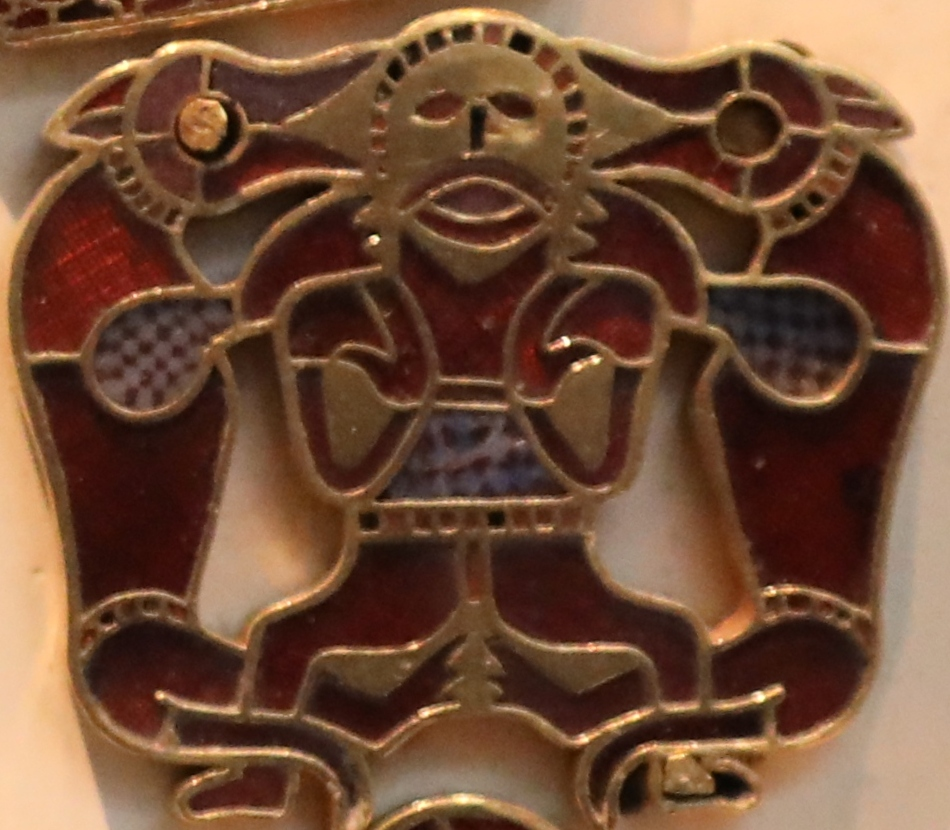
Detail of the wolf-warrior on the purse-lid, showing a one-eyed figure (hard to see in photo) between two wolves, thought to depict Odin with Geri and Freki.

The Roman legions withdrew from Britain in about 410 CE, by which time there is already evidence that groups of Germanic people were living alongside the native Romano-British population, probably as auxiliary troops. Over the next 150 years, a period from which almost no records survive, they were evidently greatly added to by immigration, and began to create a new social structure and culture that spread to control most of Britain, and began to divide it into a number of Anglo-Saxon kingdoms.

== Description ==
The purse-lid was the top of a leather pouch for coins. The leather has decayed but forty Frankish coins and two small ingots were found with the lid. Each coin was from a different mint, indicating a deliberately selected collection. The purse hung from the waist belt by the three hinges seen on top of it. The parts of the lid in other non-jewellery materials had decayed, but it probably had a plate behind the metalwork made of valuable whalebone "ivory"; the lid is now displayed with a plain replacement plate, although the original may well have had decorative carving.

The lid formed part of an ensemble of richly decorated fittings to the clothing and weapon worn by the body that were probably made as a set. These consist of a gold belt buckle, and gold and garnet shoulder-clasps, sword harness and scabbard mounts. In particular the purse used a combination of small and large pieces of garnet in a way comparable to the shoulder-clasps. The burial "can be seen as a dramatic expression of the aspirations of East Anglian royalty", within which the ensemble of regalia "is a careful construct; it situates the owner in a dual inheritance of coin-distributing, sceptre-wielding late Roman consuls, and Germanic warrior culture, with its rich iconography of powerful animals, gods and victors."

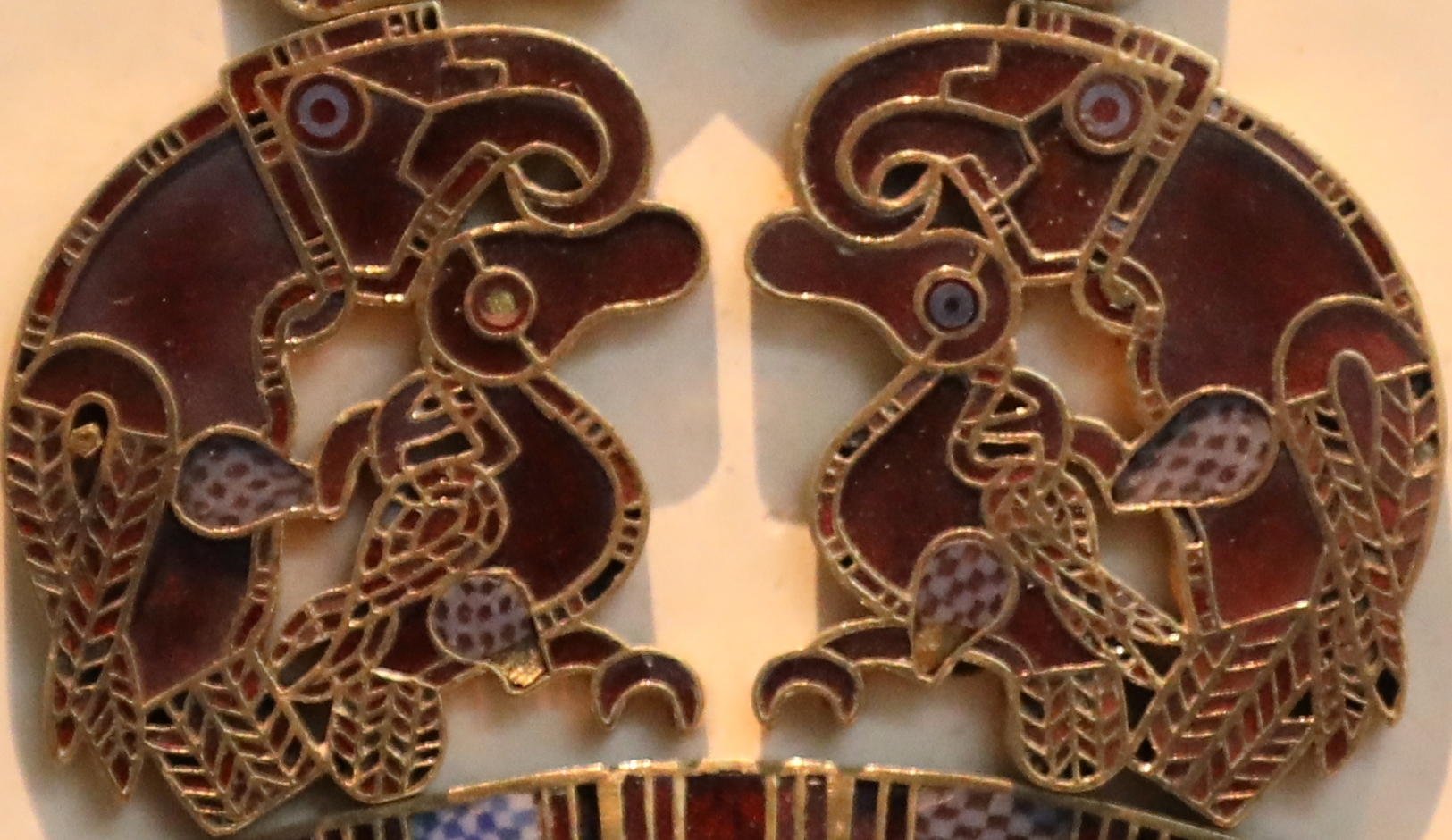
Detail of the birds of prey on the purse-lid, sitting atop its bird prey, potentially a goshawk preying on a pidgeon?

The lid consists of a kidney-shaped cellwork frame enclosing a sheet of horn, on which were mounted pairs of exquisite garnet cellwork plaques depicting birds, wolves devouring men, geometric motifs and a double panel showing animals with interlaced extremities. The maker derived these images from the ornament of the Swedish-style helmets and shield-mounts also in the burial. In his work they are transferred into the cellwork medium with dazzling technical and artistic virtuosity.

On the outside of the lid there are symmetrical images of a man surrounded by two wolves, a version of the ancient Master of Animals motif. The right figure lacks gold foil on one eye, which is thought to depict the god Odin (Old English: Wōden). In between these images are two more symmetrical figures, this time depicting a bird of prey swooping down upon its prey, another bird. To the ancient Anglo-Saxons, these images probably held great significance, but to modern historians it is difficult to be sure of the symbolism in these figures. It is possible that the heraldic composition of the men and the wolves alludes to the family name of the Sutton Hoo ship burial – the Wuffingas, or Wolf's People. They could also, along with the eagle, exhibit power, heroism, and courage. Above the animal and human figures the artists inlaid abstract designs.

== Excavation ==
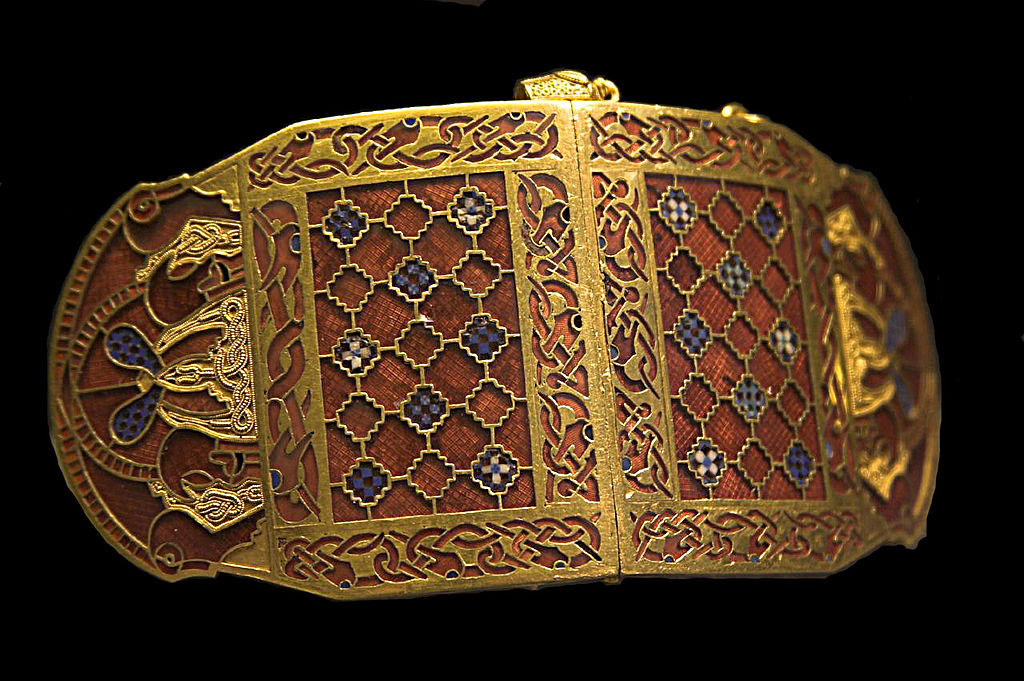
Shoulder clasps from Sutton Hoo

Sutton Hoo is a series of 6th-7th century burial mounds found in Suffolk, England. The first and also the largest mound, originally excavated in 1939 by Basil Brown, contained a 90-foot-long (27 m) ship, and is supposedly the burial site of Rædwald, the leader of the Wuffing dynasty. It was in this mound that archaeologists discovered the elaborately decorated purse-lid. The original excavation records of the mound were destroyed during World War II, and only pictures of the rivets in the sand remain as evidence. The excavated materials were sent to London, and restoration and documentation of the objects found did not begin until the end of the war. Decades later, starting in 1965 and ending in about 1971, the mound was excavated again, first by Rupert Bruce-Mitford, and then by Paul Ashbee. Between the years of 1986 and 1992, the Sutton Hoo Research Committee, under the leadership of Martin Carver, re-excavated Mound 2. At this time, archaeologists also excavated Mounds 5, 6, 14, 17, and 18. Here, Carver discovered thirty-nine burials. These 8th-11th century burials were, perhaps, execution burials, as the bodies that were spread around Mound 5 were in what was most likely the ship's gallows.
