= Mercie Lack =

British teacher and photographer

- Born: 9 November 1894
- Died: 1985 (aged 90–91)
- Occupation: School teacher, amateur photographer
- Employer: Putney High School

Mercie Keer Lack ARPS (1894-1985) was a British teacher and photographer particularly known for her photography of the discoveries at the site of Sutton Hoo in 1939, (with her friend and teaching colleague Barbara Wagstaff), and for her photographs of London street scenes.

== Life ==
Mercie Keer Lack was born in south London on 9 November 1894. She is widely reported as a teacher in press coverage of her photography at Sutton Hoo. Lack and Barbara Wagstaff (1895-1974) both joined the Royal Photographic Society in 1944 and gained their Associate the same year. They are reported as amongst the teaching staff of Putney High School 1935-6, which would fit with Lack's London photography series of the 1930s. She became a life member of the RPS in 1949. She died on 23 April 1985 in Stevenage.

== London photography ==
Lack captured life on the night-time streets of 1930s London on glass lantern slides, which are now held by the Museum of London. Several of these slides featured in the Museum's temporary exhibition 'London Nights', May - November 2018.

== Sutton Hoo ==
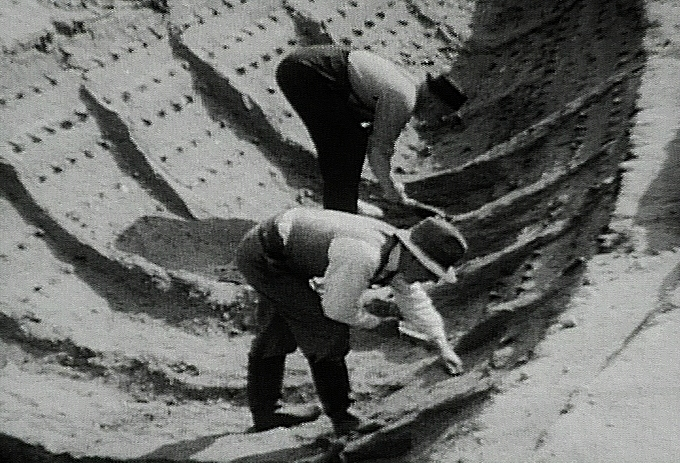
Excavation of the ship at Sutton Hoo in 1939. Still from film made by Charles Phillips' brother H. J. Phillips.

Lack and Wagstaff were on holiday in Suffolk in 1939 when the Sutton Hoo ship burial was discovered. They arrived after the treasures had been removed and photographed the excavation of the ship itself. There are speculations that they had contacts at the British Museum who informed them of the discovery. There had been a call in 1936 for amateur photographers to help in documenting archaeological sites, and appeals were carried in the journal Antiquity in March 1936 as well as in photographers' magazines. Lack and Wagstaff appear to have been part of the response of the time but their photographs were of better quality than many of the other amateurs.

Working from 9-24 August 1939, they used Leica cameras. They also each had a single roll of German 35mm Agfa colour slide film, and so Sutton Hoo was one of the first excavations in Britain captured in colour. Lack took 297 black and white photographs of the site, and Wagstaff took 150. They also took thirty six colour transparencies each. Lack also had a cine-camera and took a short 16mm film of the archaeologist Basil Brown excavating the midships section. Another photographer, from the science museum, took a picture which shows Lack and Wagstaff either side of the ship.

In 2010, a collection of around 400 prints of the pair's photographs of Sutton Hoo were found to have been donated to the National Trust a few years before by Lack's great-nephew. Until then there had been only the 29 official British Museum photographs of the excavations, and as records of measurements taken by staff from the Science Museum had been lost during World War II, Lack's photographs allowed for a more detailed re-construction of the dig than had been previously possible, particularly because many were annotated. They were digitised, and placed online in 2021. A large number of Lack's photographs and slides are also in the British Museum collection.

Lack was given a collection of ship rivets by Charles Phillips on the last day of the 1939 excavation. She bequeathed them to the British Museum. Lack and Wagstaff provided much of the visual material - still and moving image - for a BBC documentary The Million Pound Grave broadcast on 17 August 1965.

== Exhibitions ==
- Captured on Camera: The Summer of 1939 National Trust Sutton Hoo 23 November 2010 – 20 March 2011.
- We Few People National Trust Sutton Hoo. Exhibition on the people behind the 1939 discovery and excavations.
- London Nights Museum of London 11 May-11 November 2018.
