= Phoebe de Gaye =

British costume designer for film and television

- Born: July 1949 (age 77); Hendon, London, United Kingdom
- Other names: Phoebe De Gaye; Phoebe DeGaye; Phoebe Degaye
- Education: Wimbledon School of Art, Costume for Theatre and Screen; Motley Theatre Design Course, Group 7, 1972–1973
- Occupation: Costume designer
- Years active: 1976–present
- Awards: Best Costume Design, 16th British Academy Television Craft Awards, 2015; Costume Design – Scripted, Royal Television Society Craft & Design Awards, 2023
- Website: https://www.phoebedegaye.com/

Phoebe de Gaye is a British costume designer for film and television, known for period accurate details and research-based design methods.

== Early life and education ==
Phoebe de Gaye was born in July 1949, in Hendon (present-day, Barnet), London.

In the early 1970s de Gaye studied costume for theatre and screen at the Wimbledon School of Art. In 1972, de Gaye attended the postgraduate Motley Theatre Design Course. de Gaye graduated in 1973 as part of "Group 7".

== Career ==
In the late 1970s de Gaye worked on a number of Arts Council of Great Britain and British Film Institute productions as a costume designer, art director and design consultant. de Gaye's early work also included theatre.

Once established as a costume designer at the BBC, de Gaye was assigned as costume designer on the first series of Only Fools and Horses, which established the template for the run of the show. de Gaye went to car boot sales and markets to research Del Boy characters, and bought clothes in Oxford Street shops, sourcing Gabicci shirts and cheap sheepskin coats. It was common for the BBC to try out inexperienced designers on sitcoms, and de Gaye recalled being an "acting designer, and the job was given to me as a way of trying me out before deciding whether to appoint me as a full-blown designer".

In the early 1990s, de Gaye worked as costume designer for the historical drama Tom & Viv. Analysis of the film's costumes against real photos of the film's subjects has highlighted de Gaye's simplification of the wardrobes and her use of colour contrasts to show relationships between characters.

de Gaye worked on four episodes of Season 1 of Agatha Christie's Marple, starring Geraldine McEwan. The series was set in the 1950s with "spot on" period costuming. Actor Cherie Lunghi has spoken about collaborating with de Gaye to develop character, and credited the period-accurate "body bandage" suspenders and stockings as key to posture and deportment.

de Gaye did further period drama work on the 2014 BBC action series The Musketeers, leading a large team that included "seamstresses, cutters and breakdown artists, who distress and age costumes to make them look authentic." The show required many duplicate costumes for stunts and padding inside costumes. de Gaye has spoken about her research and design process, using historical visual sources, as well as an extensive library that she often refers to for inspiration. For her work on The Musketeers, de Gaye received a BAFTA Craft Award.

In 2017, de Gaye worked on The White Princess, a period drama series starring Jodie Comer. de Gaye had approximately ten weeks to prepare before filming started, and has spoken about drawing influences for this period from paintings and engravings, then adapting these influences for a modern audience to create a world that drew the viewers in.

As costume designer for Season 1 of Killing Eve, de Gaye created an iconic wardrobe for the character Villanelle that launched the show into the fashion pages and is the subject of a growing body of academic work. de Gaye's process involved creating a shared mood board for Villanelle and Eve Polastri to develop the contrasts between the characters. The most influential costume was the pink Molly Goddard dress and Balenciaga boots, worn in the episode, I'll Deal With Him Later. de Gaye has described how the designer items were slightly altered and exaggerated by her team, creating a distinctive and dramatic look for the character.

de Gaye was nominated for another BAFTA Craft Award for her work on The English, a revisionist Western BBC TV series starring Emily Blunt. Rafe Spall has spoken about de Gaye's influence on his acting choices in the show, acknowledging that "a large part of what I've thrown at this character is down to her."

== Filmography ==
=== Film ===
Year	Title	Role	Notes	Ref(s)
1976	Justine	Costume Designer	British Film Institute Production Board	
1976	Hogarth	Production Assistant	Arts Council of Great Britain	
1978	The Life Story of Baal	Art Director	British Film Institute Production Board	
1979	Four Questions About Art	Art Director		
1979	Phoelix	Design consultant	British Film Institute Production Board	
1979	Correction, Please or How We Got into Pictures	Art Director	Arts Council of Great Britain	
1980	At the Fountainhead (Of German Strength)	Costume Designer	British Film Institute Production Board	
1988	On the Black Hill	Costume Designer		
1992	Carry on Columbus	Costume Designer		
1994	Tom & Viv	Costume Designer		
1994	A Man of No Importance	Costume Designer		
2000	Snatch	Costume Designer	With Verity Hawkes	
2001	Birthday Girl	Costume Designer		
2002	Killing Me Softly	Costume Designer		
2004	Creep	Costume Designer		
2006	Land of the Blind	Costume Designer		
2008	The Other Man	Costume Designer		

=== Television ===
Year	Title	Role	Notes	Ref(s)
1981	Only Fools and Horses	Costume Design	6 episodes	
1982	L for Lester		6 episodes	
1982	Top of the Pops	Costumes	1 episode	
1984	The Young Ones		2 episodes	
1984–1985	The Tripods		18 episodes	
1990	Lorna Doone		Television film	
1996	The Sculptress		4 episodes	
1997	Original Sin		TV miniseries	
2003	The Forsyte Saga	Costume Design	8 episodes, second series	
2004	Belonging	Costume Designer	Television film	
2004–2005	Marple		4 episodes	
2008	Lark Rise to Candleford		10 episodes	
2009	Skellig		Television film	
2012	Sinbad		1 episode	
2013	A Touch of Cloth		2 episodes	
2014–2015	The Musketeers		20 episodes	
2016	The Living and the Dead		6 episodes	
2017	The White Princess		8 episodes	
2018	Killing Eve		8 episodes	
2019	The Spanish Princess		8 episodes	
2019	Treadstone		10 episodes	
2022	The English	Costume Design	6 episodes	
2024	Belgravia: The Next Chapter		8 episodes	
