= 2019 British Academy Television Craft Awards =

Technical achievements in TV awards ceremony

20th British Academy Television Craft Awards
- Date: 28 April 2019
- Site: The Brewery, London
- Hosted by: Stephen Mangan

Highlights
- Most awards: A Very English Scandal (3)
- Most nominations: Killing Eve (9)

Television coverage
- Network: BBC One

The 20th Annual British Academy Television Craft Awards are presented by the British Academy of Film and Television Arts (BAFTA) and was held on 28 April 2019. The awards were held at The Brewery, City of London, and given in recognition of technical achievements in British television of 2018.

== Winners and nominees ==
Winners will be listed first and highlighted in boldface.

Best Breakthrough Talent	Best Director: Multi-Camera
**Akemnji Ndifornyen (composer, producer and writer) - Famalam (BBC Three)**; Dawn Shadforth (director) - Trust (Silenzio) (BBC Two); Georgia Christou (writer) - Through the Gates (On the Edge) (Channel 4); Lizzie Kempton (director) - Manchester Bomb: Our Story (BBC Three)	**Barbara Wiltshare - Inside No.9 Live: Dead Line (BBC Two)**; Bridget Caldwell - Royal British Legion Festival of Remembrance (BBC One); Julia Knowles, Helen Scott, Simon Staffurth - The Royal Wedding: Prince Harry and Megan Markle (BBC One); Liz Clare - The Voice UK (ITV)
Best Director: Fiction	Best Director: Factual
**Stephen Frears - A Very English Scandal (BBC One)**; Harry Bradbeer - Killing Eve (Episode 1) (BBC One); Mahalia Belo - The Long Song (BBC One); Thomas Vincent - Bodyguard (Episode 1) (BBC One)	**Ben Anthony - Grenfell (BBC One)**; David Soutar, Joe Pearlman - Bros: After the Screaming Stops (BBC Four); James Rogan - Stephen: The Murder that Changed a Nation (BBC One); Paddy Wivell - Prison (Channel 4)
Best Writer: Drama	Best Writer: Comedy
**David Nicholls - Patrick Melrose (Sky Atlantic)**; Lennie James - Save Me (Sky Atlantic); Phoebe Waller-Bridge - Killing Eve (BBC One); Russell T Davies - A Very English Scandal (BBC One)	**Daisy May Cooper, Charlie Cooper - This Country (BBC Three)**; Peter Kay, Sian Gibson, Paul Coleman - Peter Kay's Car Share: The Finale (BBC One); Stefan Golaszewski - Mum (BBC Two); Writing Team - Cunk on Britain (BBC Two)
Best Editing: Fiction	Best Editing: Factual
**Pia Di Ciaula - A Very English Scandal (BBC One)**; Gary Dollner - Killing Eve (Episode 1) (BBC One); Steve Singleton - Bodyguard (Episode 1) (BBC One); Tony Kearns - Bandersnatch: Black Mirror (Netflix)	**Will Gilbey - Bros: After the Screaming Stops (BBC Four)**; Ben Brown - Grenfell (BBC One); Emma Lysaght - Louis Theroux: Altered States (Choosing Death) (BBC Two); Matt Lowe - Drowning in Plastic (BBC One)
Best Costume Design	Best Make Up & Hair Design
**Suzanne Cave - A Very English Scandal (BBC One)**; Charlotte Holdich - The Long Song (BBC One); Marianne Agertoft - The City and the City (BBC Two); Phoebe de Gaye - Killing Eve (BBC One)	**Vickie Lang - Vanity Fair (ITV)**; Daniel Phillips - A Very English Scandal (BBC One); Konnie Daniel - Mrs Wilson (BBC One); Nicole Stafford - The Little Drummer Girl (BBC One)
Best Production Design	Best Original Music
**Tom Burton - Patrick Melrose (Sky Atlantic)**; Helen Scott - A Very English Scandal (BBC One); Kristian Milsted - Killing Eve (BBC One); Maria Djurkovic, Tatiana MacDonald - The Little Drummer Girl (BBC One)	**David Holmes, Keefus Ciancia - Killing Eve (BBC One)**; Cho Young-Wuk - The Little Drummer Girl (BBC One); Murray Gold - A Very English Scandal (BBC One); Hauschka - Patrick Melrose (Sky Atlantic)
Best Photography: Fiction	Best Photography: Factual
**Woo-Hyung Kim - The Little Drummer Girl (BBC One)**; Balazs Bolygo - Collateral (BBC Two); James Friend - Patrick Melrose (Sky Atlantic); Julian Court - Killing Eve (Episode 7) (BBC One)	**Lindsay McCrae - Dynasties: Emperor (BBC One)**; Camera Team - Earth’s Natural Wonders: Surviving Against the Odds (BBC One); Jaimie Gramston - Michael Palin in North Korea (Channel 5); Daniel Dewsbury, Stuart Bernard, Jonny Ashton - The Mighty Redcar (BBC Two)
Best Titles & Graphic Identity	Best Special, Visual & Graphic Effects
**Alan Smith, Mark Roalfe - The 2018 Winter Olympics (BBC One)**; Allison Brownmoore, Anthony Brownmoore, Joe Nowacki - Take Your Pills (Netflix); Matt Willey - Killing Eve (BBC One); Steve Small. Kristian Andrews, Nikki Kefford-White - Black Earth Rising (BBC Two)	**Adam McInnes, John Smith, Kevin Horsewood - Troy: Fall of a City (BBC One)**; Glassworks, Jean-Clement Soret, Clayton McDermott - Bandersnatch (Black Mirror) (Netflix); Kent Houston, Peerless, Freefolk, Asa Shoul - The Alienist (The Boy on the Bridge) (Netflix); Simon Frame, Martin Oberlander, Adam Inglis - Britannia (Sky Atlantic)
Best Sound: Fiction	Best Sound: Factual
**Sound Team - Killing Eve (BBC One)**; Sound Team - A Very English Scandal (BBC One); Sound Team - The Little Drummer Girl (BBC One); Simon Farmer, Dan Johnson, Marc Lawes - Bodyguard (BBC One)	**Sound Team - Later Live... with Jools Holland (BBC Two)**; Doug Dreger, Rowan Jennings - Michael Palin in North Korea (Channel 5); Kate Davis, Steve Onopa - Amy Winehouse: Back to Black (Classic Albums) (BBC Four); Tim Owens, Graham Wild, Kate Hopkins - Dynasties: Chimpanzees (BBC One)
Best Entertainment Craft Team
**Nigel Catmur, David Cole, Kate Dawkins, Kevin Duff - Royal British Legion Festival of Remembrance (BBC One)**; Dave Davey, David Tench, Dominic Tolfts, Kevin Duff - The Voice UK (ITV); Lisa Armstrong, Jason Gilkinson, Mark Kenyon - Strictly Come Dancing (BBC One); Tim Telling, Tom Neenan, Steven Andrews, Ben Blease - The Mash Report - Zeppotron (BBC Two)

== Programmes with multiple nominations ==
Programmes that received multiple nominations
Nominations	Programme
9	Killing Eve
8	A Very English Scandal
5	The Little Drummer Girl
4	Patrick Melrose
3	Bodyguard
3	Royal British Legion Festival of Remembrance
2	Bandernsatch : Black Mirror
2	Bros: After the Screaming Stops
2	Dynasties
2	Grenfell
2	The Long Song
2	Michael Palin in North Korea
2	The Voice UK

== Most major wins ==
Shows that received multiple awards
Wins	Show
3	A Very English Scandal
2	Killing Eve
2	Patrick Melrose

== See also ==
- 2019 British Academy Television Awards
