= I'll Deal with Him Later =

- Killing Eve episode
- Villanelle wears a pink tutu for a psychiatric analysis. The dress had an impact in fashion and popular culture.
- Episode no.: Season 1 Episode 2
- Directed by: Harry Bradbeer
- Written by: Phoebe Waller-Bridge
- Original air date: 15 April 2018
- Running time: 43 minutes

Guest appearances
- Charlie Hamblett as Sebastian; Yakim Nedel as Filip Petrova; Sonia Elliman as Madame Tattevin; David Bertrand as Jerome; Huw Parmenter as Senior; Stefanie Mueller as Nicole Moreaux; Aurélie Meriel as Carla De Mann; Sabrina Open as Local Girl; Will Haddington as London Waiter

Episode chronology
← Previous "Nice Face"	Next → "Don't I Know You?"

"I'll Deal with Him Later" is the second episode of the BBC America television show Killing Eve. It aired on 15 April 2018 in the United States and 22 September 2018 in the United Kingdom.

The episode sees Villanelle (Jodie Comer) continue on her killing spree despite a troubling psychiatric assessment and the knowledge that intelligence services are hunting her down; Eve Polastri (Sandra Oh) quickly forms a task force of bright young agents.

== Synopsis ==
Villanelle stalks and shoots a man in an office building in Bulgaria. She watches the man die, then sits down on a chair, looking bored.

In London, Eve meets Carolyn (Fiona Shaw) for breakfast in a restaurant. Carolyn reveals that she knows Eve has been compiling cases that may fit her theory of a female assassin working internationally, a theory that Carolyn shares. Carolyn hires Eve to run the investigation and introduces her to computing specialist Kenny (Sean Delaney).

In Paris, Villanelle is told by Konstantin (Kim Bodnia) that there are concerns over her mental state due to her recent behaviour and that she needs to undergo a psychiatric assessment before working again. The assessment goes well until a mysterious woman named Anna is mentioned, and subsequently Villanelle is suspended from active duty. She distracts Konstantin by expressing her affection for him and steals a postcard with details of her next job from him.

Eve hires Bill (David Haig) and Elena (Kirby Howell-Baptiste) to join her team. She and Bill agree that the killer is the key to the organisation behind the pattern of assassinations.

Villanelle enters into a relationship with her neighbour Sebastian (Charlie Hamblett). She disguises herself as wait staff and infiltrates a political fundraising event. She finds Carla de Mann (Aurélie Meriel) alone in the ladies' room and persuades her to sample a perfume she had prepared earlier, which in fact is a nerve agent that triggers de Mann's asthma. Villanelle watches her die then leaves, taking the bottle of perfume with her.

Eve, Bill, and Elena arrange a meeting with Frank (Darren Boyd) at a pub. Eve and Bill press Frank about the CCTV footage, and Frank admits he made up the footage to discredit Eve's theories. Eve tells Niko that she is working for MI6 to track down the killer, prompting Niko to ask if it's what she wants to do.

Villanelle returns to her apartment and is confronted by Konstantin, angry that she disobeyed him. They are interrupted by Sebastian, who then leaves, but not before spying the bottle of perfume and taking it with him. Konstantin informs Villanelle that a woman is leading an operation in London to find her. Villanelle asks for her name, which he divulges—Eve Polastri. They hear a thud from outside and find Sebastian dead, having accidentally suffocated himself when he tried on the perfume.

Villanelle searches for photos of Eve on the Internet and identifies Eve from a group photo of Niko's contract bridge club. Concurrently, Eve sifts through photos of nursing staff at the hospital. Both Eve and Villanelle realise they met the other at the hospital.

== Production ==
=== Molly Goddard pink dress ===
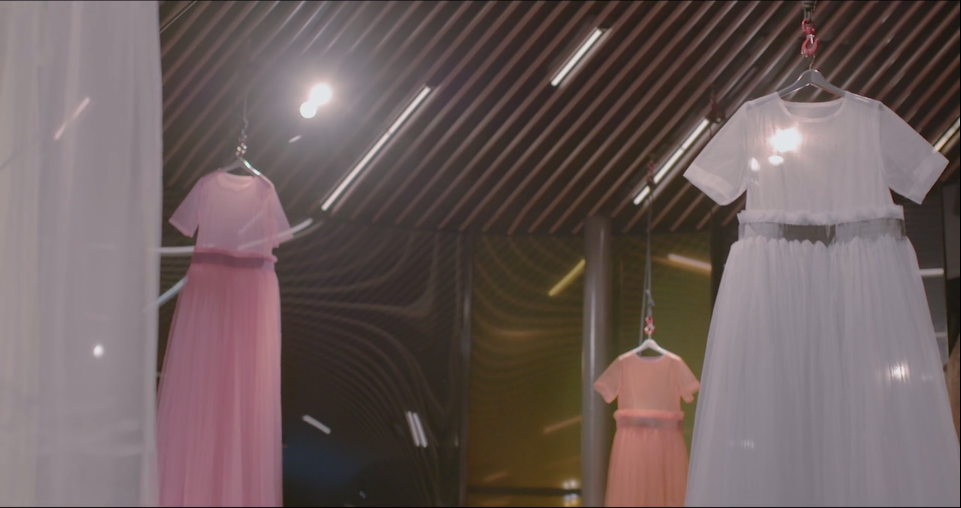
Similar dresses by the designer hanging in an installation

Villanelle wears a pink tulle dress in a scene where she attends an informal psychiatric assessment at the request of Konstantin, who is concerned that she may be getting too sentimental. She then defiantly walks into the street wearing it. The dress was designed by Molly Goddard as part of her Spring 2017 collection, (Note: It is seen under the collection on the Vogue website (as look #26) and the London Fashion Week catwalk. The Muse names the dress as "from Goddard's 2016 line"; the dress premiered in 2016, which may explain this statement.) and was inspired by a 1958 Balenciaga babydoll dress. The color of the dress has been consistently described as "bubblegum pink". (Note: In: Vulture ("sort of bubblegum pink"), The Guardian ("billowing, bubblegum-pink, Molly Goddard gown"), Bustle ("a bubblegum pink Molly Goddard dress"), and IndieWire ("And the pink was such a great color. Bubblegum.") Sonia Saraiya of Vanity Fair says it is "saccharine-pink".) Madeleine Davies of The Muse describes it as a "cotton candy fantasy", and Melania Hidalgo of The Cut calls it a "pastel-colored confection".

==== Context ====
Luke Jennings described Villanelle's style as "goofy couture", which Steff Yotka of Vogue believes Phoebe de Gaye has applied to this outfit, saying that "[Villanelle's] wardrobe matches her flights of fancy" and "rarely do you see a character whirling through Paris in a shocking pink Molly Goddard dress".

Lauren Sharkey of Bustle called it "the first heavy-hitting ensemble" of the show. De Gaye says that the key to making the outfit work was Jodie Comer, that "you couldn't put that dress on any actress and bring it off. [Comer]'s got the kind of chutzpah to wear those things with just the right amount of nonchalance."

==== Conception ====
In the script, the dress in the scene was described as "a big poofy dress". The writing team had originally envisioned something more classical, an idea they returned to throughout production, but eventually went with the Molly Goddard dress proposed by costume designer Phoebe de Gaye. De Gaye had been inspired by the script, telling IndieWire that when she read the description "[she] thought, 'Well, Molly Goddard has those. Let's go and get one of those.'" She also drew inspiration from when she had been creating an initial mood board for the character and "found a great fashion image of somebody shimmying down a drain pipe wearing a kind of great floaty thing", saying she was also "looking for things which were playing with the masculine and feminine side to [Villanelle] because she's sort of slightly ambivalent". De Gaye bought the dress directly from Goddard, and modified it for the episode slightly, explaining: "I added a bit of a little bit more trim to the sleeves, a little bit more but not much. Then also we built out the skirt a little bit, we put a little bit more sort of under-petticoat things that poofed out even more slightly." For the rest of the outfit, de Gaye describes the black Balenciaga boots and black bra Villanelle also wears as "an antidote to all that frou-frou". De Gaye has said that she loves the dress.

==== Characterization ====
"It's like she's sticking two fingers up and saying, 'Okay, I'm going to dress like a little girl and act like a mad little girl.' She’s quite subversive. I thought that would be great to use with the color and the mixture of the extremely feminine, almost to the slightly perverse point, with those boots, which are a good mix." — Phoebe de Gaye, costume designer

De Gaye believes that the dress is "a very strong statement on camera" and also "a big opportunity for [Villanelle] to do a sort of very girly thing, but undercut it by putting it with boots", saying that she "thought that Molly Goddard stuff was just perfect for that more insouciant, putting two fingers up, rather subversive [moment]". She does add, however, that though "it's quite nice to give these [designer clothes] an airing [...] it's always got to work in with the dramatic needs of the scenes". Yotka praised de Gaye for "finding innovative ways to include contemporary luxury items". Critics have commented on how the dress works to reflect Villanelle's character and subversive nature.

Within the context of the scene, Ellie Violet Bramley, writing for The Guardian, notes that the dress "is Villanelle at her elusive, teasing best" because it shows her "throwing all manner of curveballs in the direction of those trying to psychoanalyse her"; Hidalgo says that "the cheerful dress is a perfect contrast to the grisly subject, true to her character's dark sense of humor". Sharkey, and Hahn Nguyen of IndieWire, agree with De Gaye's assessment that Villanelle's dress choice is deliberately childish. Sharkey says that "Villanelle decides to wear the frothy tulle dress as a middle finger to her bosses. If they want her to act like a young girl, why not dress like one?", and Nguyen mentions that she's "almost like a little girl who is playing dress-up, and her manner at the session is mocking and playful".

The dress has been described as a subversive choice outside of the specific context, too. Chloe Foussianes of Town & Country says that it is subversive in how "it channels Villanelle so well: flamboyant, unapologetically feminine, and utterly unconcerned with squeezing into society's rigid boundaries". In a slightly different assessment, Sonia Saraiya of Vanity Fair believes that it is subversive because of how it contrasts the feminine with the masculine, as "[the dress is] paired, rebelliously, with punky Balenciaga boots". Yotka agrees that the boots were a good contrast, and also writes that the dress is a deliberate statement, saying that when "Villanelle [...] stands in Paris's Place Vendôme in that very outfit, [she is] rivaling Rihanna in statement-making style". Nguyen likewise adds to her assessment that Villanelle is still trying to be "attention-grabbing" in her choice, similar to Bramley mentioning that "any misguided expectation of ultra-femininity is undercut by her choice of Balenciaga leather boots". Agreeing that "[Villanelle] has to add a twist by pairing the overtly feminine style with tough Balenciaga biker boots", Sharkey also uses another interpretation in noting that it reflects Villanelle's other choices in extravagant murder outfits and that "by dressing angelically yet powerfully, she draws in her victims almost by hypnotising them", suggesting that nobody would suspect a girl in a pink dress of being an assassin.

==== Cultural impact ====
"For anyone who watched hit series Killing Eve in 2018, starring Sandra Oh and Jodie Comer, you'll be familiar with that pink dress moment. [...] Clearly taking inspiration from Villanelle's defiant attitude in her Molly Goddard babydoll, this year's Oscars red carpet guests are showing their fearlessness in the face of a giant pink frock." — Natasha Bird, Elle

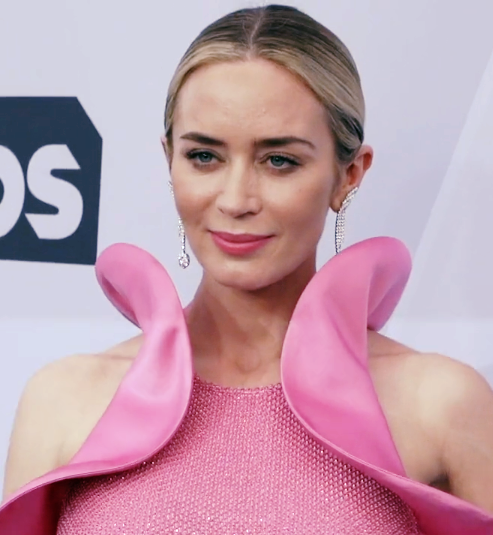
Actress Emily Blunt in bright pink at the 2019 SAG Awards.

Morwenna Ferrier says that the appearance of the outfit on the show "broke the internet". Natasha Bird called it "fashion's big television moment of the year", and Katie Rosseinsky called it "[the] autumn's best fashion moment". Stephanie Eckardt of W said that the dress turned "an otherwise unnotable scene [...] into a standout fashion moment".

The dress had an impact in popular culture. Foussianes asserts that "when Killing Eve fans close their eyes, they likely picture Villanelle in this look", with Danielle Fowler of Harper's Bazaar writing that since Villanelle appeared in the dress it has "continued to steer our shopping habits"; a November 2018 article in The Guardian states that "you can tell a TV villain has made their mark on popular culture if they become a Halloween costume" and noted that "for every Trumpian wig or handmaid's bonnet seen at a Halloween party, there was a giant pink dress based on the one worn by the assassin Villanelle". More significantly, multiple commenters saw a further impact in the abundance of pink dresses worn at the 91st Academy Awards and other ceremonies in this award season, writing that there was clear inspiration taken from the episode. (Note: Including Annabel Rackham of the BBC, Natasha Bird and Estelle Tang of Elle, Lindsay MacDonald of TV Guide, Chloe Street of the Evening Standard, Jess Cartner-Morley of The Guardian, Hannah Williams of Garage, Meghan O'Keefe of Decider, Kate Finnigan of Vogue, Maija Kappler and Louise Whitbread of Huffington Post, Sarah Spellings of The Cut, Lucy Abbersteen of Marie Claire, and The Irish Times, as well as articles in Hello!, and The Independent. Yahoo! UK Style Editor Alison Coldridge opened her red carpet article by saying "We don't know if it was the frothy, pink tulle Molly Goddard dress Villanelle wore in 'Killing Eve' that inspired it, but pink was certainly the colour du jour at the Oscars 2019." Alice Newbold, also for Vogue, does not mention the show (unlike colleague Finnigan) but implicitly connects the trend, referring to Phoebe Waller-Bridge and saying that Linda Cardellini's dress "made Molly Goddard's signature tulle confections look like cupcakes next to a decadent gateau". Without making the connection, Dhani Mau of Fashionista wrote that "...pink was easily the night's biggest color trend, and not only that, but these pink gowns were equipped with girly, voluminous, statement-making accents; tulle, ruffles and bows (also a Golden Globes trend) abounded", with the trend noted by others.) A cake depicting the character in the dress was made for the 2019 Cake International festival, created by Turkish culinary artist Tuba Geçkil. Through Autumn/Winter 2019, tulle remained in mode, a trend credited to this dress on the show.

Within the spy thriller genre, Yotka claims that "[this dress] has also redefined the look of an international assassin story. There are no blunt bobs and leather dusters like in last summer's Atomic Blonde, nor any drab and utilitarian cargo pants or knits like those once worn by Jason Bourne."

== Reception ==
Reviewers gave positive notes to the subversive presentation of the sex scene between Villanelle and Sebastian, with Lisa Weidenfeld of The A.V. Club likening it to murder as Villanelle treats it as "nothing but another way for her to peer into someone's eyes at the exact moment of transformation"; Ariana Romero of Refinery29 praises both how the episode puts Sebastian into the Bond girl and caretaker role, and how it gives Villanelle the dominant sexuality more associated with men that leaves her powerful and calm throughout the scene in which Sebastian is overwhelmed and "performatively" vocal.

On Rotten Tomatoes the episode has a 100% rating from 5 reviews.
