= Ian Arber =

British composer for film and television

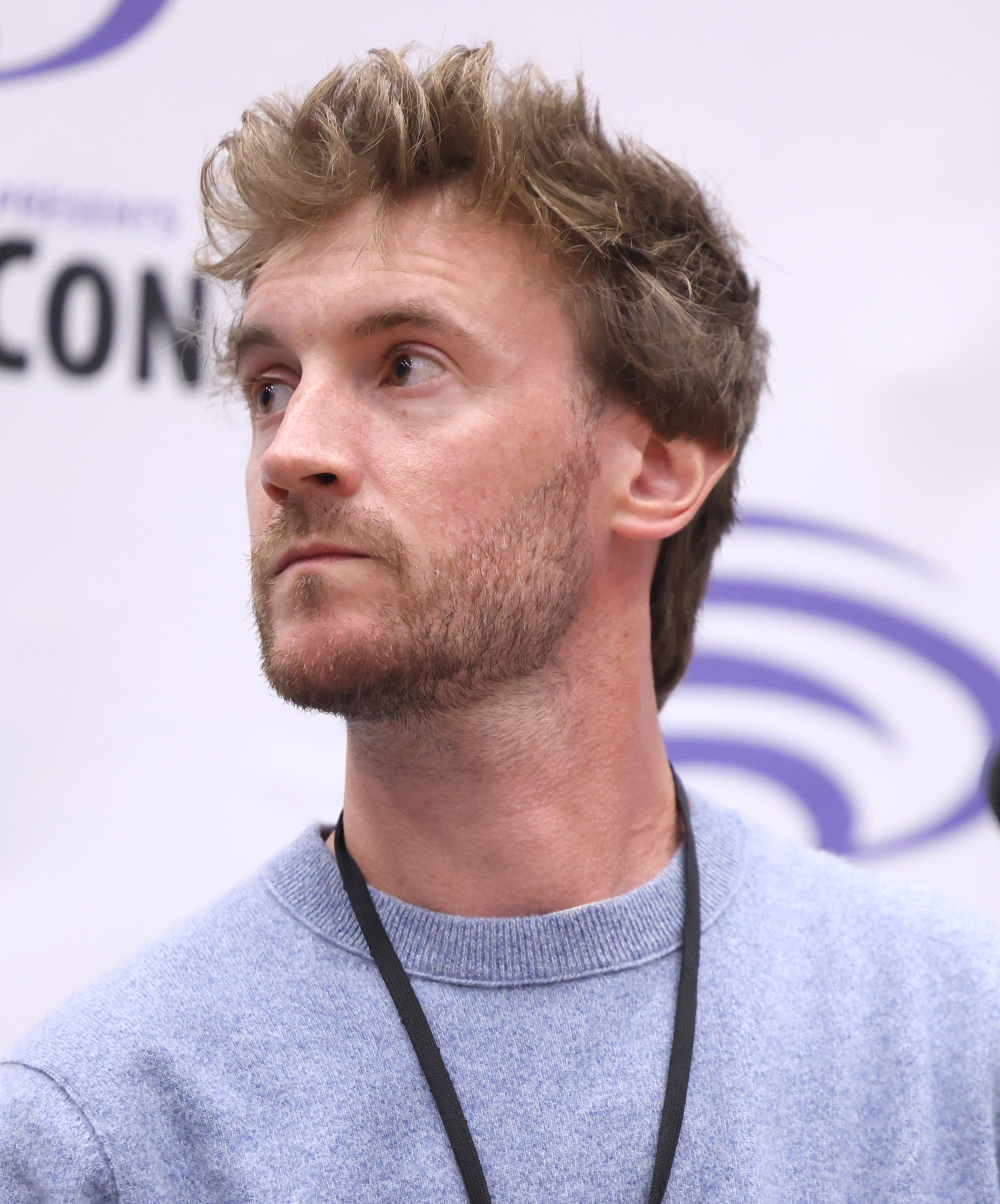
- Arber in 2025

Background information
- Origin: London, England
- Genres: Film score, soundtrack
- Occupations: Composer, musician, music producer
- Instruments: Cello, piano, guitar
- Website: ianarber.com

Ian Arber is a British composer for film and television. He is based in London, England. In 2019, he composed the music for BBC One's thriller series The Capture alongside Blur's Dave Rowntree. The Capture was the most-watched new BBC series of 2019 with over 20 million streams. Ian also scored BBC Two's comedy series Quacks, Usain Bolt's theatrical-release documentary I Am Bolt, Mo Farah's documentary No Easy Mile, and John Hurt's final film My Name Is Lenny. Ian also was assistant to composer Joe Kraemer on his score for Mission: Impossible – Rogue Nation.

Arber co-composed the score for Mo Farah: No Easy Mile with Blur's Dave Rowntree and collaborated with hip-hop legend Nas on the opening titles of I Am Bolt.

== Credits ==
| Year | Title | Director(s) | Studio(s) | Distributor | Type | Notes |
|---|---|---|---|---|---|---|
| 2022 | The Chelsea Detective | | | Acorn | TV series | |
| 2020 | The One, season 1 | Johnny Capps | Urban Myth Films | Netflix | TV series | |
| 2020 | Break | Michael Elkin | | 7&7 | Feature film | |
| 2020 | Cup of Joe, season 1 | | Philymack, Fulwell 73 | Quibi | TV series | |
| 2019 | The Capture, season 1 | Ben Chanan | | BBC One, Peacock | TV series | |
| 2019 | The Proms | David Rickard | | BBC | TV series | |
| 2019 | Show Me The Picture: The Story of Jim Marshall | Alfred George-Bailey | Bailey-Kennedy Productions | | Feature documentary | |
| 2019 | Hitsville: The Making of Motown | Gabe Turner, Ben Turner | Fulwell 73 | Showtime | Feature documentary | |
| 2018 | Medici, season 2 | Jon Cassar, Jan Michelini | Lux Vide, Big Light Productions, Rai Fiction | Rai 1, Netflix, SBS | TV series | |
| 2018 | Cruel Hearts | Paul Osborne | Conspicuous Pictures, Verax Films | | Feature film | |
| 2018 | Bros: After the Screaming Stops | Joe Pearlman, David Souttar | Fulwell 73 | XYZ Films, Lorton Distribution | Feature documentary | Co-composed with Dave Rowntree |
| 2018 | Redcon-1 | Chee Keong Cheung | Intense Productions | Intense Productions | Feature film | |
| 2018 | Island of the Dolls | Sebastian Mantilla | Retrogusto Films | | Feature film | |
| 2018 | Scott and Sid | Scott Elliott, Sid Sadowskyj | | Dreamchasers Film Ltd | Feature film | |
| 2018 | Can't Have You | Mark A. Altman | Atlantis Canyon | | Feature film | Co-composed with Joe Kraemer (composer) |
| 2017 | Quacks | Andy De Emmony | Lucky Giant | BBC Two | TV series | |
| 2017 | My Name Is Lenny | Ron Scalpello | Salon Pictures | Lionsgate | Feature film | |
| 2017 | Amy and Sophia | Adam Lipsius | Retrogusto Films | | Feature film | |
| 2016 | Mo Farah: No Easy Mile | Joe Pearlman | Fulwell 73 | | Feature documentary | Co-composed with Dave Rowntree |
| 2016 | I Am Bolt | Ben Turner, Gabe Turner | Fulwell 73 | | Feature documentary | |
| 2015 | Mission: Impossible – Rogue Nation | Christopher McQuarrie | Skydance Productions, TC Productions, Bad Robot | Paramount Pictures | Feature film | Assistant to Joe Kraemer |
| 2015 | Reunion | Shawn Chou | Monsterworks66 | | Feature film | |
| 2014 | The Window | Steve Spel | Brillen Entertainment | | Feature film | |
| 2013 | We Love Paleo | Caroleen Moise | Beyond Features | | Feature documentary | |
| 2013 | Carpe Diem: European Escapade | Eric Hinwood | ATAEC Studios | | Feature film | |
| 2012 | Changing Hands | Scott L. Schwartz | Changing Hands Film | | Feature film | |
