= Nice Face =

- Killing Eve episode
- Eve and Villanelle unknowingly meet for the first time; in the mirror, Villanelle's eyes are drawn to Eve's hair.
- Episode no.: Season 1 Episode 1
- Directed by: Harry Bradbeer
- Written by: Phoebe Waller-Bridge
- Original air date: 8 April 2018
- Running time: 43 minutes

Guest appearances
- Billy Matthews as Dominik "Dom" Wolanski; Remo Girone as Cesare Greco; Nicoló Ambrosio as Davide; Sally Reeve as Nurse Watkins; Edyta Budnik as Kasia Molkovska; Ania Marson as Ethel Rubynovitch; Ken Nwosu as Max Sanford; Sonia Elliman as Madame Tattevin; Giulia Patrignani as Girl in Ice Cream Parlor; Paolo Roca Rey as Ice Cream Vendor; Paolo D Bovani as Leoluca; Nadia Mayer as Cesare Greco's Wife; Charlyne Francis as Reception Nurse

Episode chronology
← Previous —	Next → "I'll Deal with Him Later"

"Nice Face" is the first episode of the BBC America television show Killing Eve. It aired on 8 April 2018 in the United States and 15 September 2018 in the United Kingdom.

The episode introduces the main characters as well as the complex relationship of Eve Polastri and Villanelle through dialogue and a brief interaction. It follows both Eve Polastri (Sandra Oh) and Villanelle (Jodie Comer) following the assassination of a diplomat in Vienna — a crime that Villanelle committed and Eve is tasked to solve.

== Synopsis ==
Villanelle (Jodie Comer) is eating ice cream in a shop in Vienna. She notices a little girl staring at her and exchanges smiles with her. She gets up to leave, and as she walks past the girl, she tips over her bowl of ice cream.

Eve Polastri (Sandra Oh) works for a department of MI5 that provides diplomatic protection for visitors to the UK, under her boss Bill Pargrave (David Haig). She is called in to a meeting attended by her supervisor Frank Haleton (Darren Boyd) and Carolyn Martens (Fiona Shaw), head of the Russian desk at MI6. Carolyn explains that a Russian politician involved in sex trafficking was assassinated in Vienna. The sole witness is the politician's Polish girlfriend Kasia (Edyta Budnik), who fled to London, and Eve's department is assigned with protecting her. As the meeting draws to a close, Eve floats her theory that the assassin is a woman.

At her apartment in Paris, Villanelle is given her next job by her handler Konstantin (Kim Bodnia). She travels to Tuscany and infiltrates a villa where a Mafia boss is hosting a party. Using his grandson as a lure, she baits him into a room and kills him by stabbing him in the eye with a poisoned hairpin.

Eve is informed by Bill that CCTV footage from Vienna shows the assassin was male. Disregarding Bill's instructions, she conducts an unauthorised interview with Kasia. Unable to get much useful information out of her, Eve enlists help from her English-Polish husband Niko (Owen McDonnell) and Dom (Billy Matthews), a teenage boy who plays at Niko's contract bridge club. Eve discovers from their translations that Kasia described the assassin as a woman. With the assistance of her colleague Elena (Kirby Howell-Baptiste), she learns that the descriptions of the woman do not match any known female assassins on record.

Back at her apartment, Villanelle is tasked by Konstantin to travel to London and kill Kasia. He cautions her to be discreet and stage it as suicide, as her hairpin was attracting attention from the press.

Eve goes to the hospital where the witness is housed, bringing Dom to pose as Kasia's cousin. Eve excuses herself to the bathroom, where she unknowingly encounters Villanelle disguised as a nurse. They have a brief interaction where Villanelle advises Eve to wear her hair down. Eve receives a call from Bill telling her that the CCTV footage was bogus. She returns to the hospital room to find the nurse and the two guarding police officers dead and Kasia dying, whom she tries in vain to save. Eve and Bill are both fired by Frank. Eve is approached at her home by Carolyn. Carolyn discloses that she has been tracking a female assassin working internationally over the past two years and offers Eve a chance to work on the investigation.

At her apartment, Villanelle reads a postcard containing details of her next job, taking place in Bulgaria.

== Production ==
For the assassination in Tuscany, Villanelle arrives to kill Cesare Greco and is caught out by what actress Jodie Comer calls a surprise party. Writer Phoebe Waller-Bridge said she liked the idea of Villanelle having to improvise, after only turning up with her hairpin needle, to secretly kill him whilst surrounded by people. She also said that Comer found a menacing "darkness and pleasure" in the murder scene "very easily". Executive producer Sally Woodward-Gentle said it was difficult to make the murder feel real, using camera angles and off-screen space to achieve this. The hypodermic needle at the end of the hairpin was also added to the image in post-production.

== Meeting of Eve and Villanelle ==
Eve and Villanelle unknowingly meet in this episode, in a hospital bathroom. The moment has been well analysed by critics; Sonia Saraiya of Vanity Fair notes the use of the setting to allow the two women to first see the other through a mirror, saying that when they look up "each takes note of the other's reflection" (rather than their own) and adding that this reflects the tension between the characters throughout the series, which she describes as "two women shadowboxing with the parts of themselves they have, unwittingly, seen reflected in the other". Caroline Framke of Vox writes further on the moment and how it "has a palpable charge of lust", establishing a purpose for the cat-and-mouse chase through the series beyond admiration for the other's skills, examining how first Villanelle is frozen at the sight of Eve but only for her beauty, and later how Eve recalls such a fleeting moment with precision despite not knowing the relevance of who she had bumped into. It is also noted that Eve's nervous habit of playing with her hair is what led to her meeting with Villanelle in this bathroom, with Villanelle prompting her to wear her hair down, something Eve chooses to do and is otherwise seen doing only when trying to impress or when she lets her guard down, suggesting she immediately has trust in Villanelle.

== Reception ==
The opening scene was highly praised, with Rebecca Nicholson of The Guardian saying that it "lays out the wickedly funny tone" of the show with Villanelle's interactions with the little girl; Sandra Oh mentions the humor in the juxtaposition of this scene with the introduction of Eve "bumbling along" in the next. Lisa Weidenfeld of The A.V. Club similarly praises how the episode establishes the characters "in the first ten minutes". Jo Berry of Digital Spy refers to the same two moments when she describes how "Waller-Bridge's skill at mixing drama with wry humour is on display throughout the first episode". Comparatively, Inkoo Kang of Vulture refers to the slightly later moment of Eve asking Elena for her croissant as being when she "reveals her greatness".

On Rotten Tomatoes the episode has a 100% rating from 5 reviews.

=== Accolades ===
Year	Award	Category	Nominee(s)	Result	Ref.
2018	Primetime Emmy Awards	Outstanding Writing for a Drama Series	Phoebe Waller-Bridge	Nominated	
2019	American Cinema Editors Awards	Best Edited Drama Series for Commercial Television	Gary Dollner	Won	
2019	British Academy Television Craft Awards	Director: Fiction	Harry Bradbeer	Nominated	
2019	British Academy Television Craft Awards	Editing: Fiction	Gary Dollner	Nominated	
