= 2019 British Academy Television Awards =

Annual television awards

65th British Academy Television Awards
- Date: 12 May 2019
- Site: Royal Festival Hall, London
- Hosted by: Graham Norton

Highlights
- Best Comedy Series: Sally4Ever
- Best Drama: Killing Eve
- Best Actor: Benedict Cumberbatch; Patrick Melrose
- Best Actress: Jodie Comer; Killing Eve
- Best Comedy Performance: Jessica Hynes There She Goes; Steve Pemberton Inside No. 9
- Most awards: Killing Eve (3)
- Most nominations: Killing Eve (15)

Television coverage
- Channel: BBC One

The 2019 British Academy Television Awards were held on 12 May 2019 at the Royal Festival Hall in London.

The nominations were announced on 28 March 2019, whilst the nominations for the "Virgin TV's Must-See Moment" were announced on 27 March 2019. The 2019 British Academy Television Craft Awards were held on 28 April 2019.

On 2 April 2019, it was announced that Graham Norton, following a two-year hiatus, would return to host the 2019 BAFTA Television Awards.

== Winners and nominees ==
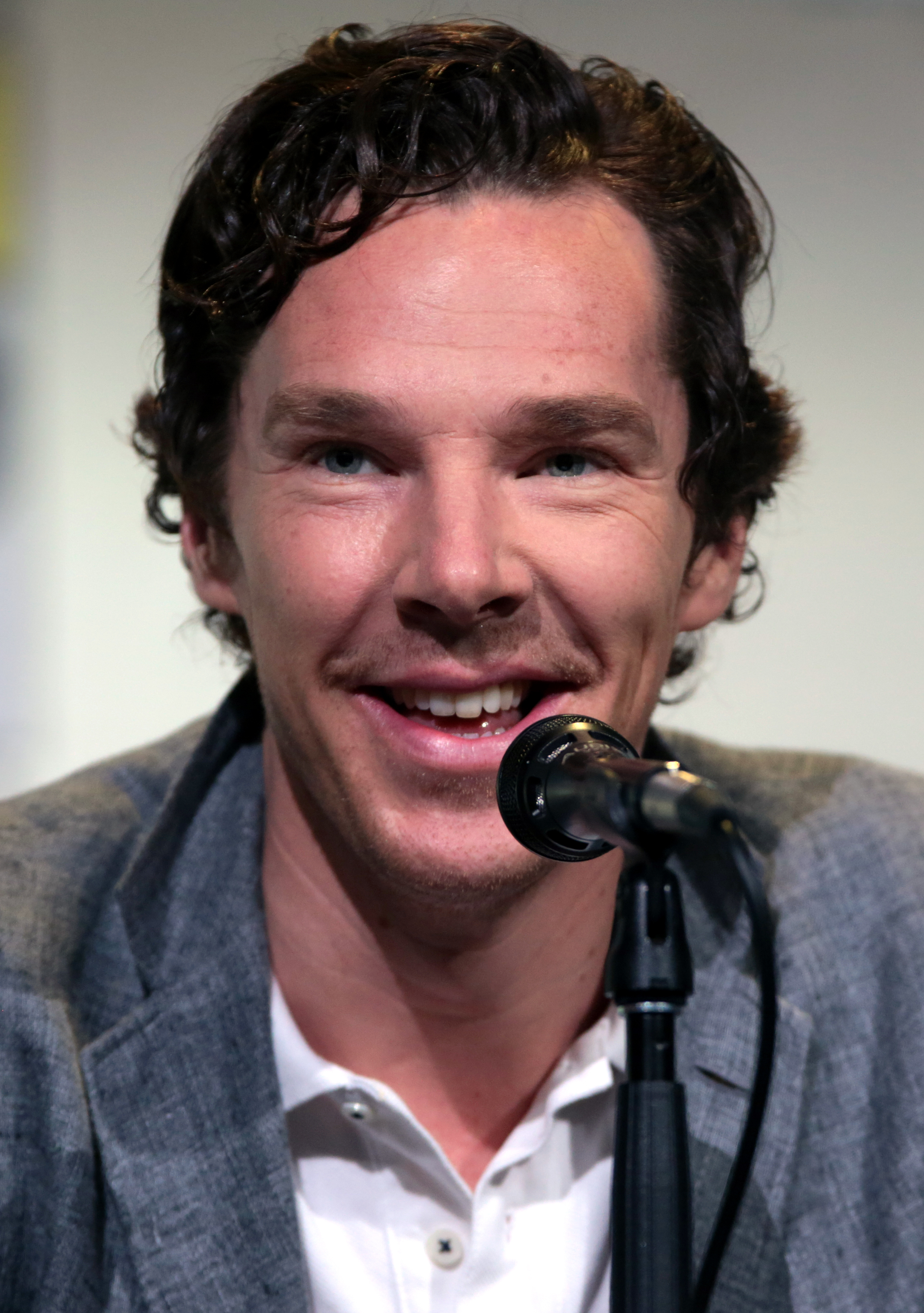
Benedict Cumberbatch, Best Actor winner

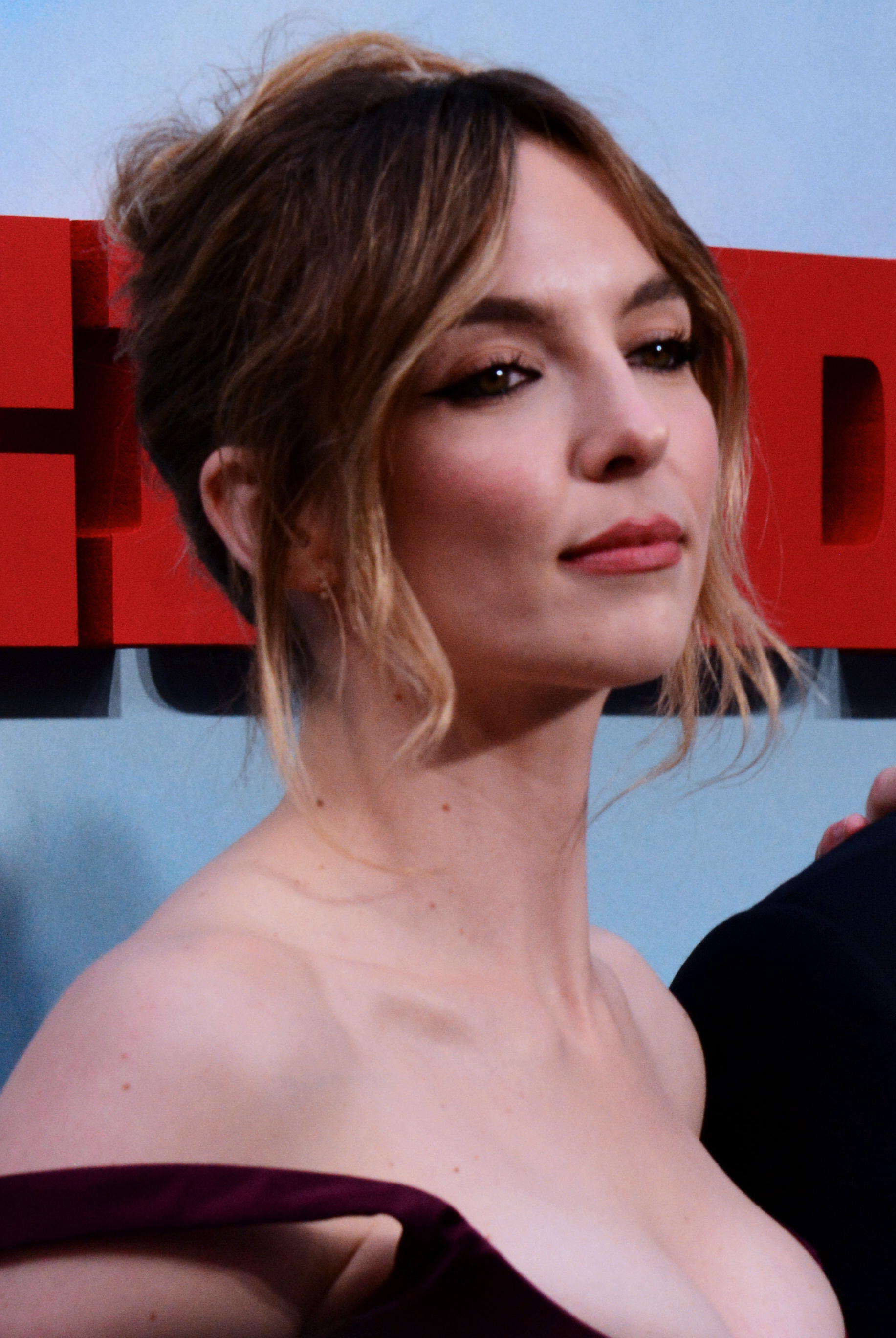
Jodie Comer, Best Actress winner

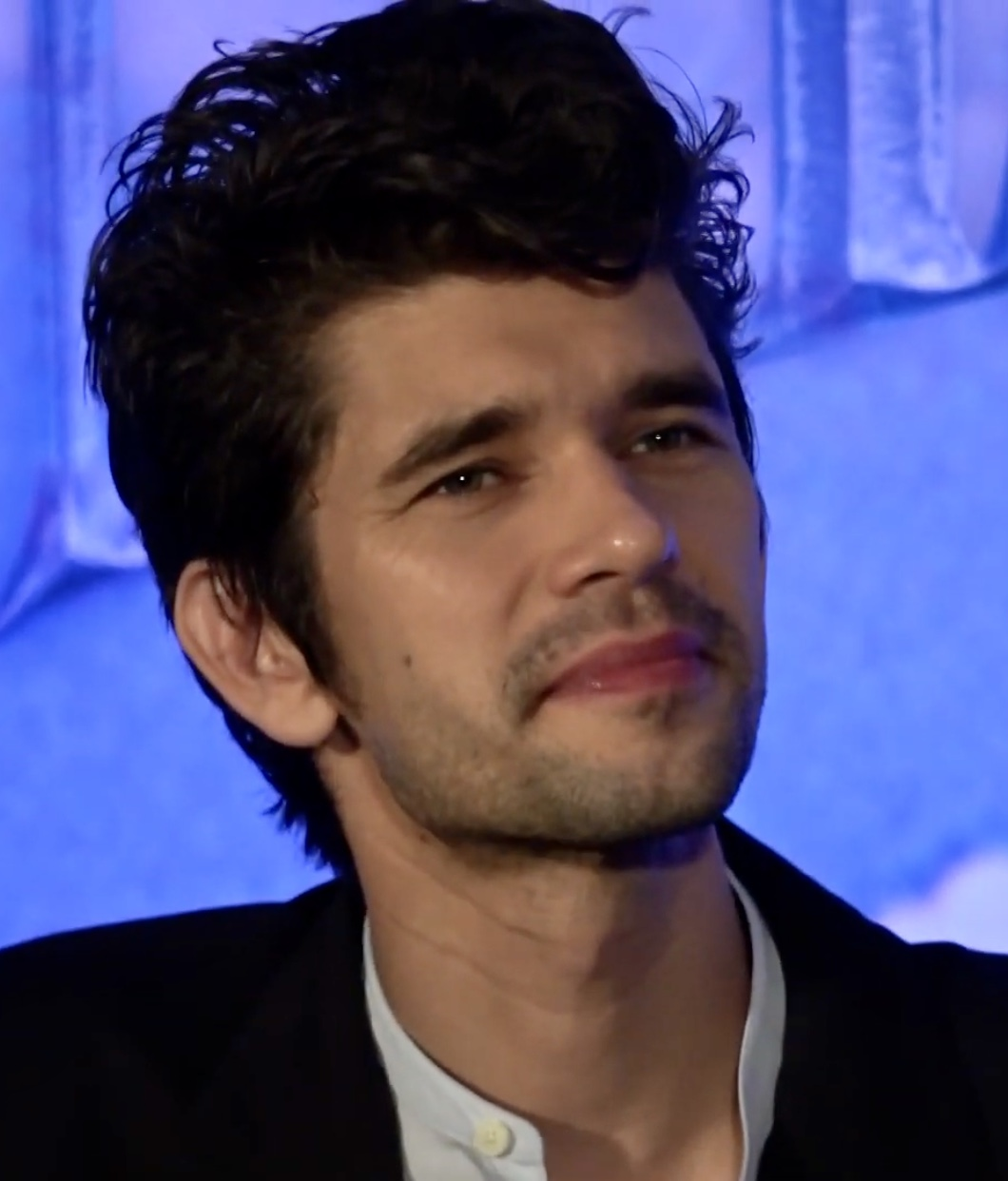
Ben Whishaw, Best Supporting Actor winner

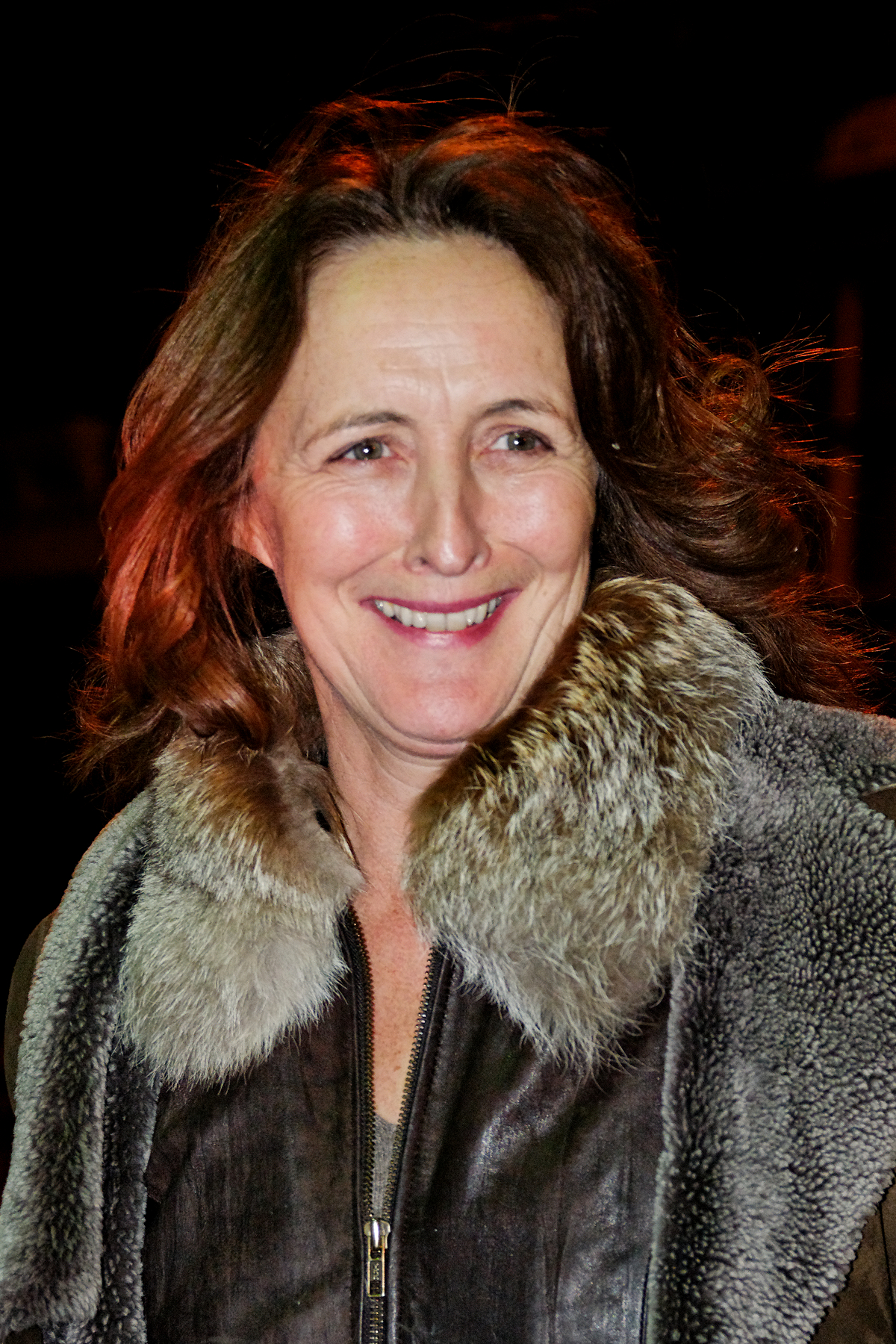
Fiona Shaw, Best Supporting Actress winner

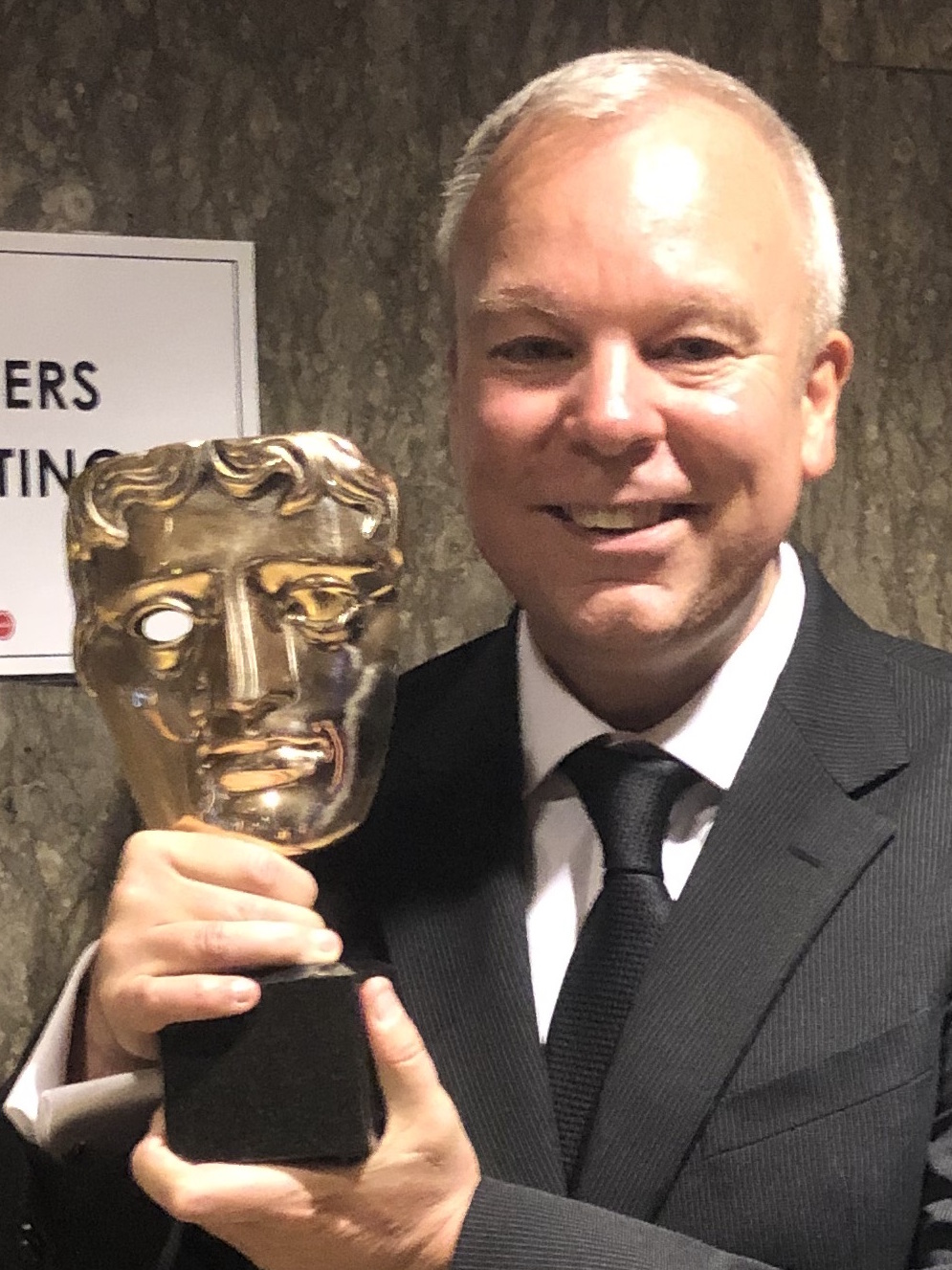
Steve Pemberton, Best Male Comedy Performance winner

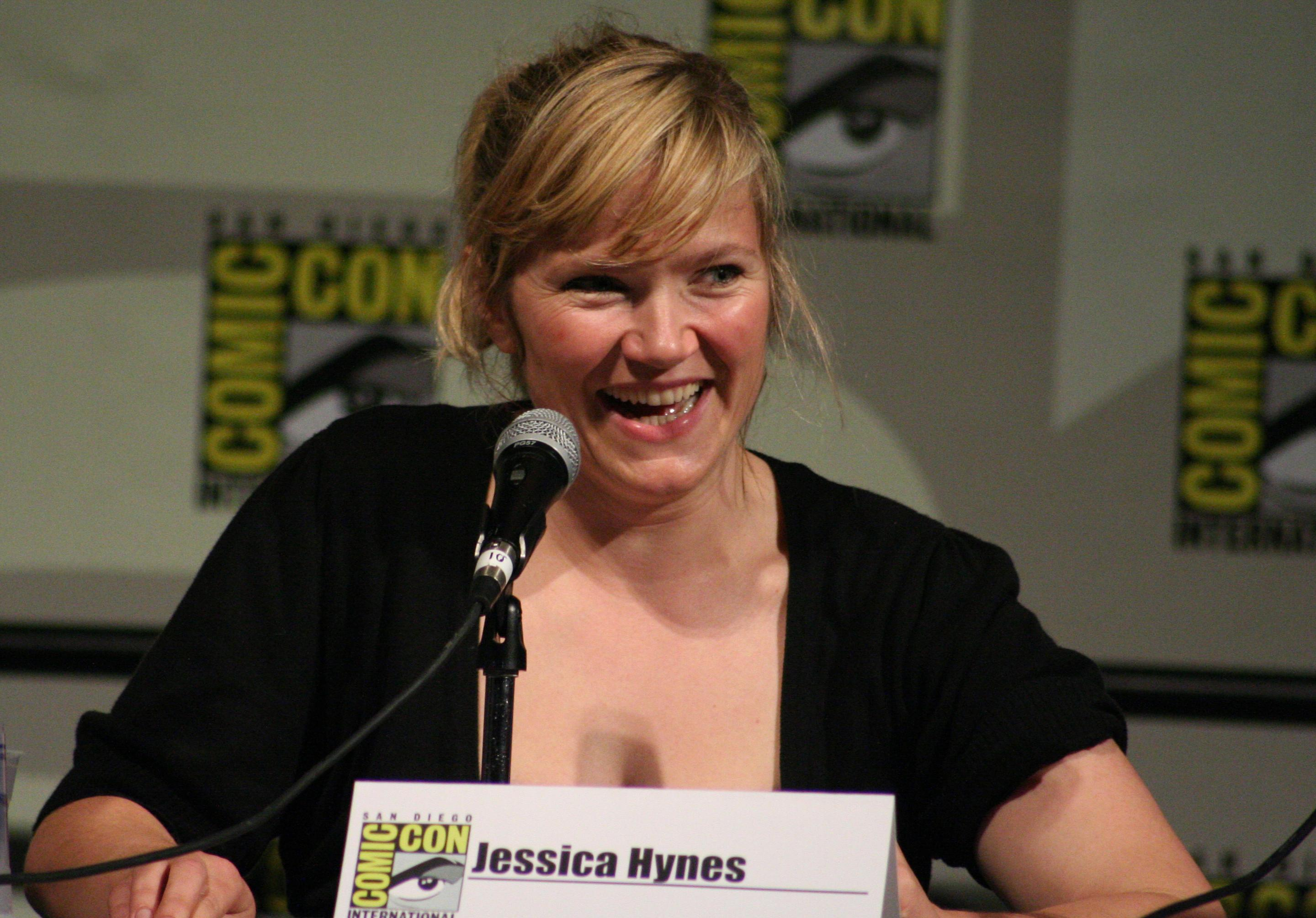
Jessica Hynes, Best Female Comedy Performance winner

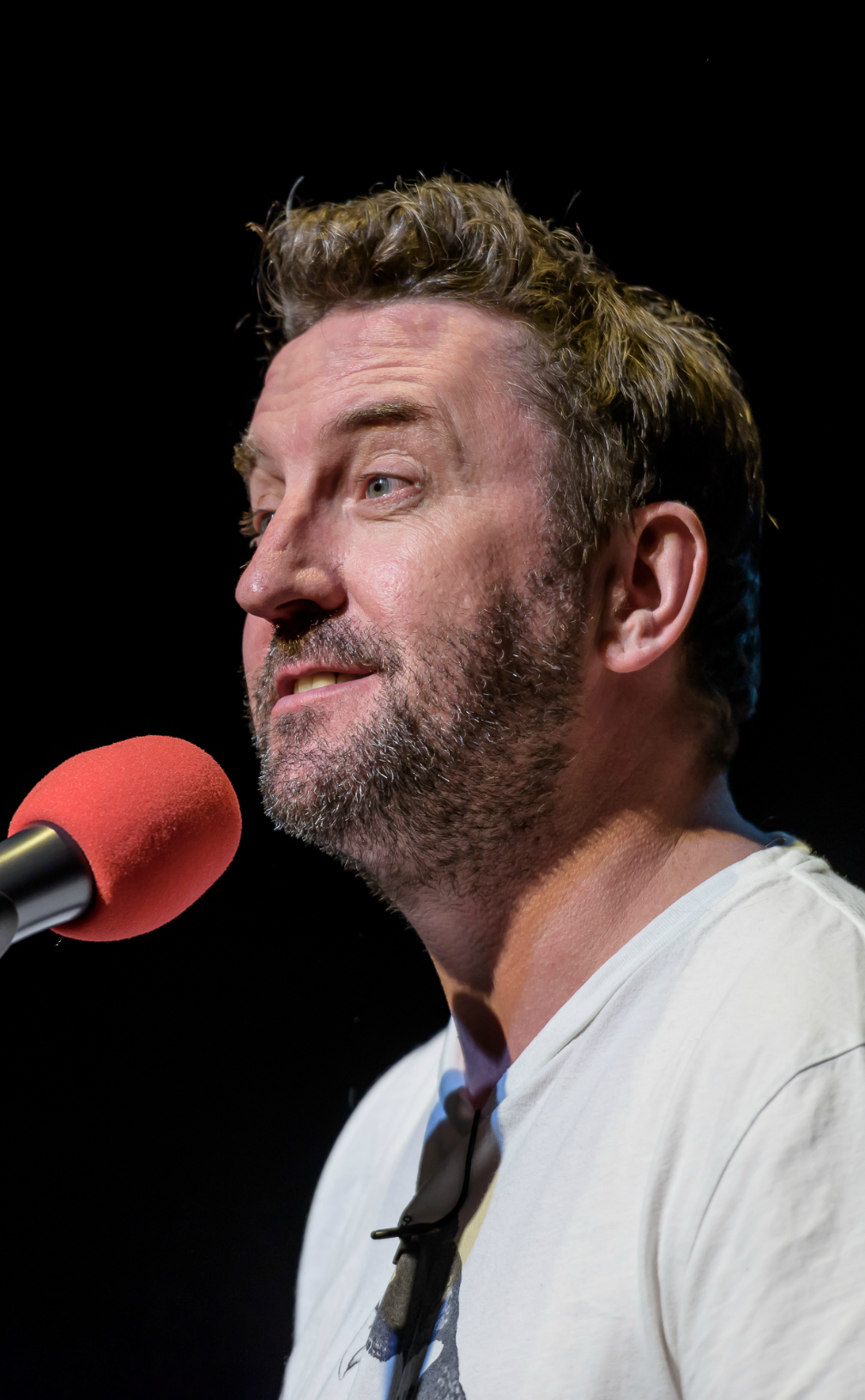
Lee Mack, Best Entertainment Performance winner

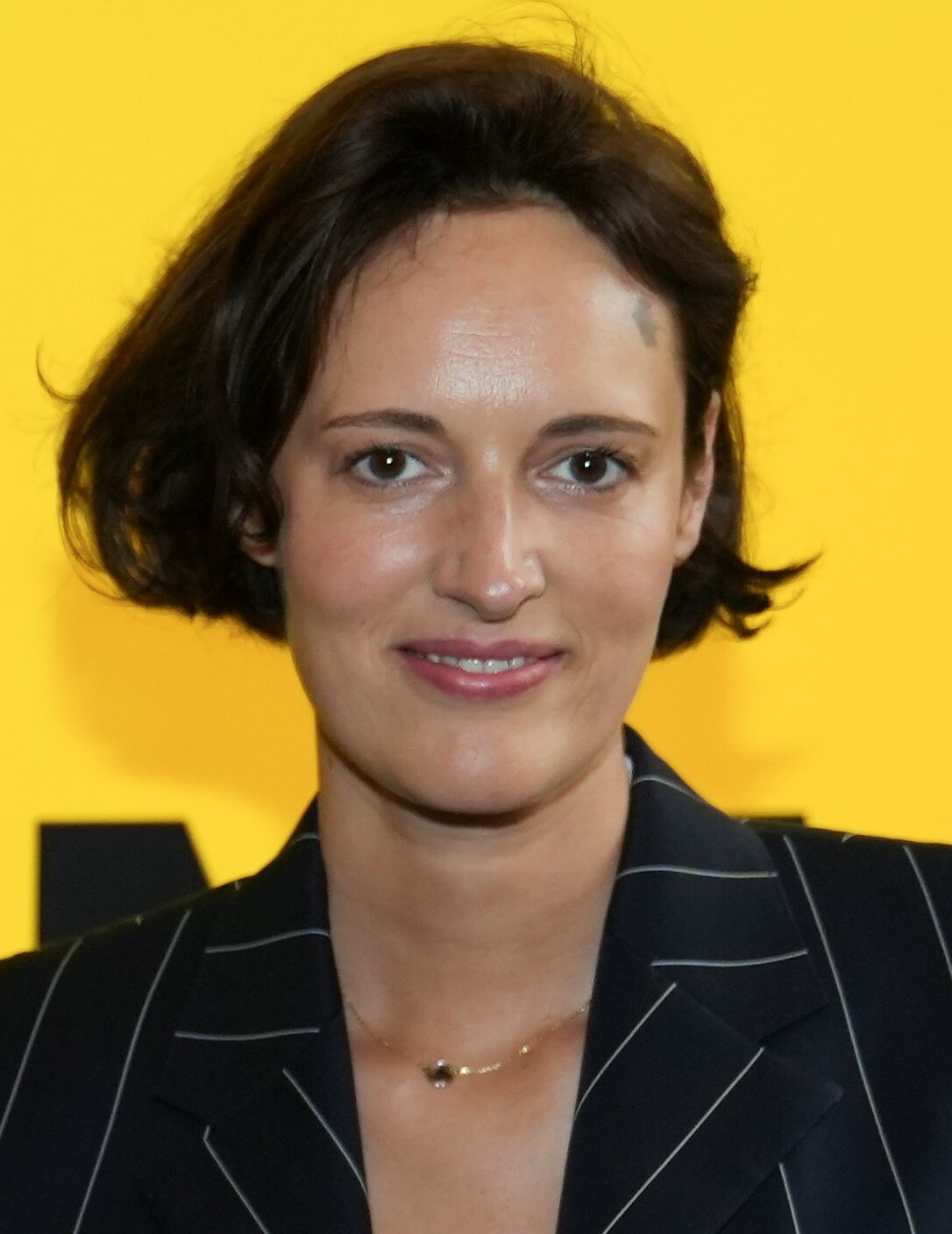
Phoebe Waller-Bridge, co-executive producer and lead writer of Killing Eve, Best Drama Series winner

Best Drama Series	Best Mini-Series
Killing Eve (BBC One); Bodyguard (BBC One); Informer (BBC One); Save Me (Sky Atlantic)	Patrick Melrose (Sky Atlantic); A Very English Scandal (BBC One); Kiri (Channel 4); Mrs Wilson (BBC One)
Best Single Drama	Best Soap and Continuing Drama
Killed by My Debt (BBC Three); Black Mirror: Bandersnatch (Netflix); Care (BBC One); Through the Gates (On the Edge) (Channel 4)	EastEnders (BBC One); Casualty (BBC One); Coronation Street (ITV); Hollyoaks (Channel 4)
Best Actor	Best Actress
Benedict Cumberbatch – Patrick Melrose as Patrick Melrose (Sky Atlantic); Hugh Grant – A Very English Scandal as Jeremy Thorpe (BBC One); Lucian Msamati – Kiri as Tobi Akindele (Channel 4); Chance Perdomo – Killed by My Debt as Jerome (BBC Three)	Jodie Comer – Killing Eve as Villanelle (BBC One); Keeley Hawes – Bodyguard as Julia Montague (BBC One); Sandra Oh – Killing Eve as Eve Polastri (BBC One); Ruth Wilson – Mrs Wilson as Alison Wilson (BBC One)
Best Supporting Actor	Best Supporting Actress
Ben Whishaw – A Very English Scandal as Norman Josiffe / Norman Scott (BBC One); Kim Bodnia – Killing Eve as Konstantin Vasiliev (BBC One); Stephen Graham – Save Me as Fabio "Melon" Melonzola (Sky Atlantic); Alex Jennings – Unforgotten as Tim Finch (ITV)	Fiona Shaw – Killing Eve as Carolyn Martens (BBC One); Monica Dolan – A Very English Scandal as Marion Thorpe (BBC One); Keeley Hawes – Mrs Wilson as Dorothy Wick (BBC One); Billie Piper – Collateral as Karen Mars (BBC One)
Best Male Comedy Performance	Best Female Comedy Performance
Steve Pemberton – Inside No. 9 as Various Characters (BBC Two); Jamie Demetriou – Stath Lets Flats as Stath (Channel 4); Alex Macqueen – Sally4Ever as David (Sky Atlantic); Peter Mullan – Mum as Michael (BBC Two)	Jessica Hynes – There She Goes as Emily Yates (BBC Four); Daisy May Cooper – This Country as Kerry Mucklowe (BBC Three); Julia Davis – Sally4Ever as Emma (Sky Atlantic); Lesley Manville – Mum as Cathy Bradshaw (BBC Two)
Best Scripted Comedy	Best Comedy and Comedy Entertainment Programme
Sally4Ever (Sky Atlantic); Derry Girls (Channel 4); Mum (BBC Two); Stath Lets Flats (Channel 4)	A League of Their Own (Sky One); The Big Narstie Show (Channel 4); The Last Leg (Channel 4); Would I Lie to You? (BBC One)
Best Entertainment Performance	Lew Grade Award for Entertainment Programme
Lee Mack – Would I Lie to You? (BBC One); Ant & Dec – Ant & Dec's Saturday Night Takeaway (ITV); David Mitchell – Would I Lie to You? (BBC One); Rachel Parris – The Mash Report (BBC Two)	Britain's Got Talent (ITV); Ant & Dec's Saturday Night Takeaway (ITV); Michael McIntyre's Big Show (BBC One); Strictly Come Dancing (BBC One)
Best Factual Series or Strand	Huw Wheldon Award for Specialist Factual
Louis Theroux's Altered States (BBC Two); 24 Hours in A&E (Channel 4); Life and Death Row: The Mass Execution (BBC Three); Prison (Channel 4)	Suffragettes with Lucy Worsley (BBC One); Bros: After the Screaming Stops (BBC Four); Grayson Perry: Rites of Passage (Channel 4); Superkids: Breaking Away from Care (Channel 4)
Robert Flaherty Award for Single Documentary	Best Feature
Gun No. 6 (BBC Two); Driven: The Billy Monger Story (BBC Three); My Dad, The Peace Deal and Me (BBC One); School for Stammers (ITV)	Who Do You Think You Are? (BBC One); Gordon, Gino and Fred's Road Trip (ITV); The Great British Bake Off (Channel 4); Mortimer & Whitehouse: Gone Fishing (BBC Two)
Best Reality and Constructed Factual	Best Live Event
I'm a Celebrity...Get Me Out of Here! (ITV); Dragons' Den (BBC Two); Old Peoples' Home for 4 Year Olds (Channel 4); The Real Full Monty: Ladies' Night (ITV)	The Royal British Legion Festival of Remembrance (BBC One); Open Heart Surgery: Live (Channel 5); The Royal Wedding: Prince Harry and Megan Markle (BBC One); Stand Up to Cancer (Channel 4)
Best News Coverage	Best Current Affairs
Cambridge Analytica Uncovered (Channel 4); Bullying and Harassment in the House of Commons (BBC Newsnight) (BBC Two); Good Morning Britain: On the Knife Edge (ITV); Good Morning Britain: Thomas Markle (ITV)	Myanmar's Killing Fields (Dispatches) (Channel 4); Football's Wall of Silence (Al Jazeera Investigations) (Channel 4); Iran Unveiled: Taking on the Ayatollahs (Exposure) (ITV); Massacre at Ballymurphy (Channel 4)
Best Sport	Best Short Form Programme
2018 World Cup Quarter Final: England vs Sweden (BBC One); 2018 Six Nations: Scotland vs England (BBC One); England's Test Cricket – Cook's Farewell (Sky Sports); Winter Olympics (BBC Two)	Missed Call (Real Stories); Bovril Pam (Snatches: Moments from 100 Years of Women's Lives) (BBC Four); The Mind of Herbert Clunkerdunk (BBC iPlayer); Wonderdate (BBC iPlayer)
Best International Programme	Virgin TV's Must-See Moment
Succession (Sky Atlantic / HBO); 54 Hours: The Gladbeck Hostage Crisis (BBC Four); The Handmaid's Tale (Channel 4 / Hulu); Reporting Trump's First Year: The Fourth Estate (Storyville) (BBC Two)	Bodyguard – "Julia Montague assassinated" (BBC One); Coronation Street – "Gail's monologue on the suicide of Aidan Connor" (ITV); Doctor Who – "Rosa Parks, the Doctor and her companions make sure historical moments remain" (BBC One); Killing Eve – "Eve stabs Villanelle" (BBC One); Peter Kay's Car Share – "The Finale" (BBC One); Queer Eye – "Tom completes his transformation" (Netflix)

== Programmes with multiple nominations ==
The following is a list of programmes with multiple nominations at both the 2019 British Academy Television Awards and the 2019 British Academy Television Craft Awards.

Programmes that received multiple nominations
Nominations	Programme
15	Killing Eve
12	A Very English Scandal
6	Bodyguard
6	Patrick Melrose
5	The Little Drummer Girl
4	Mrs Wilson
4	Mum
3	Bros: After the Screaming Stops
3	Black Mirror: Bandersnatch
3	The Royal British Legion Festival of Remembrance
3	Sally4Ever
3	Save Me
3	Would I Lie to You?
2	Ant & Dec's Saturday Night Takeaway
2	Collateral
2	Coronation Street
2	Dynasties
2	Good Morning Britain
2	Grenfell
2	Killed by My Debt
2	Kiri
2	The Long Song
2	Louis Theroux's Altered States
2	The Mash Report
2	Michael Palin in North Korea
2	Peter Kay's Car Share
2	Prison
2	The Royal Wedding: Prince Harry and Megan Markle
2	Stath Lets Flats
2	Strictly Come Dancing
2	Through the Gates (On the Edge)
2	This Country
2	The Voice UK
2	Winter Olympics

Networks that received multiple nominations
Nominations	Network
76	BBC One
25	BBC Two
23	Channel 4
16	ITV
14	Sky Atlantic
8	BBC Three
6	BBC Four
6	Netflix
3	Channel 5

== Most major wins ==
Shows that received multiple awards
Wins	Show
3	Killing Eve
2	Patrick Melrose

Wins by Network
Wins	Network
11	BBC One
4	Sky Atlantic
3	BBC Two
3	ITV

== Controversy ==
The inclusion of Killing Eve attracted some controversy as BAFTA rules state that a programme must have its premiere in the UK before elsewhere in order to be eligible, and Killing Eve premiered on BBC America in the US in April 2018, but in the UK in September 2018. BAFTA subsequently amended its eligibility rules, removing the requirement for UK programmes to premiere in the UK.

== In Memoriam ==
- André Previn
- Jacqueline Pearce
- Peter Armitage
- Bill Sellars
- Wendy Beckett
- Magenta Devine
- Clive Swift
- Windsor Davies
- Grant McKee
- Sandy Ratcliff
- Richard Baker
- Chris Pye
- Luke Perry
- Leslie Grantham
- Mya-Lecia Naylor
- Ernest Maxin
- Monica Sims
- Jeremy Hardy
- Anthony Owen
- Denis Norden
- Jill James
- Ray Galton
- Rachael Bland
- John Bluthal
- Peter Tork
- Leonie Jameson
- Bernard Hepton
- June Whitfield
