= I Am Bolt =

- Cinema release poster
- Directed by: Benjamin Turner; Gabe Turner
- Based on: Usain Bolt
- Produced by: Leo Pearlman
- Starring: Usain Bolt; Serena Williams; Asafa Powell; Pelé; Ziggy Marley
- Cinematography: Patrick Smith
- Edited by: Paul Monaghan
- Music by: Ian Arber
- Production companies: Fulwell 73; Doyen Global
- Distributed by: Universal Pictures
- Release date: 28 November 2016 (United Kingdom)
- Running time: 102 minutes
- Country: United Kingdom
- Language: English
- Box office: $41,535

I Am Bolt is a 2016 British biographical documentary sports film co-directed by Benjamin Turner and Gabe Turner and produced by Leo Pearlman. It is based on the life of Jamaican sprinter and three-time Olympic gold medalist and World Record holder for 100m, 200m, 4×100m relay, Usain Bolt, the fastest man in recorded human history.

The film describes Bolt’s journey in winning nine gold medals and the incidents surrounding the Olympic titles. The film was released on 28 November 2016 in United Kingdom and then worldwide. The film received mostly positive reviews from critics.

== Cast ==
- Usain Bolt as himself
- Pelé as himself
- Neymar as himself
- Serena Williams as herself
- Asafa Powell as himself
- Sebastian as himself
- Ziggy Marley as himself
- Glen Mills as himself
- Chronixx as himself
- Yohan Blake as himself
- Maurice Greene as himself
- Ricky Simms as himself
- Wellesley and Jennifer Bolt as themselves
- Dwayne Jarrett as himself
- Nugent Walker as himself
- Dwayne Barnett as himself
- Nas

== Reception ==
=== Critical response ===
I Am Bolt received positive reviews. On review aggregator Rotten Tomatoes, the film has an approval rating of 83% based on 242 reviews, with an average rating of 7/10. The site's critical consensus reads, "Bolt's golden era may be too recent and the sponsors too dominant for any real warts to be included, but his charm and sheer physical wonder make this a compelling watch regardless."

Justin Lowe of The Hollywood Reporter reacted positively, saying: "Athletic achievements don’t get much more unbeatable than the records held by Jamaican runner Usain Bolt, who’s won nine consecutive Olympic gold medals and even more World Championship awards. Considered the fastest sprinter who’s ever logged track time, Bolt is a hero to millions and admired on a level comparable to global sports legends like Muhammad Ali and Pele."

Xan Brooks of The Guardian gave it 2/5, stating "Fans of Usain Bolt will find much to relish in this gushing homage to the nine-time Olympic gold medallist, which chases its idol from his 2015 slump, via scenes of downtime in Jamaica to the podium in Rio.
