= Bros: After the Screaming Stops =

2018 documentary film

- Theatrical release poster
- Directed by: Joe Pearlman; David Soutar
- Produced by: Leo Pearlman
- Starring: Matt Goss; Luke Goss
- Cinematography: Nat Hill
- Edited by: William Gilbey
- Music by: David Rowntree; Ian Arber
- Production company: Fulwell 73
- Distributed by: XYZ Films; Lorton Distribution
- Release dates: 22 September 2018 (Fantastic Fest); 9 November 2018 (United Kingdom)
- Running time: 97 minutes
- Country: United Kingdom
- Language: English
- Box office: £13,248

Bros: After the Screaming Stops is a 2018 documentary film about the English pop band Bros, consisting of twins Matt and Luke Goss. It was directed by Joe Pearlman and David Soutar and produced by Leo Pearlman. The film documents the band’s preparation for their reunion shows at London's O2 Arena in August 2017, 28 years after their last performance. It is a British venture produced by Fulwell 73, with Lorton Entertainment and XYZ Films serving as distributors. It is also in association with BBC Music.

After the Screaming Stops had its U.K. premiere as part of the 2018 BFI London Film Festival on 17 October 2018 and then given a limited release in the United Kingdom on 9 November 2018. The film was also released on home media on 12 November peaking at #1 on the Official Music Video Chart, and was on the chart for 27 weeks. The film won awards including Moment of the Year at the 2019 BBC Radio & Music Awards, National Film Awards UK for Best Documentary, and the BAFTA Award for Best Editing: Factual.

== Synopsis ==
"I am very proud to be making this music documentary, and lucky enough to be able to film my journey in this crazy world we call the music industry, it has already been quite the ride, but long may it continue!."

— Matt Goss

On 5 October 2016 Bros had announced that they were reforming for a one-off concert at The O2 Arena in London. Tickets for the concert had sold out in seven seconds and was the fastest sell-out in history for any Live Nation show at The O2. The film follows Matt and Luke Goss as they set out three weeks before their London reunion shows, after not playing together since Wembley Stadium in 1989, and the band breaking up more than two decades ago.

The title of the film is taken from a question posed to the brothers by Irish television presenter Terry Wogan during a 1990 interview, "Have you guys thought, what you gonna do when that screaming stops?".

== Production ==
=== Development ===
"I'm looking forward to introduce the real me to my fans and have the wonderful opportunity to see this documentary become the definitive truth on mine and my brother’s worlds coming together to bring the most vibrant Bros show to date, to the big screen."

— Luke Goss

On 26 June 2017, Fulwell 73 Productions announced that a feature documentary following the pop band Bros was in production. It was produced by Leo Pearlman, with Heather Greenwood as co-producer and Gina Powell as creative producer. The film was financed by Julian Bird at Lorton Entertainment. It took around six months from inception to complete the documentary, including discussions, filming and 10 weeks of editing.

=== Filming ===
After the Screaming Stops was shot for around twelve weeks in 2017, from May to mid-August, with the first scene recorded at Matt's home in Las Vegas. During the interview process, an individual interview took over five hours. The production staff used various past recordings of Bros on the documentary, with interviews and concert footage briefly featured.

=== Music ===
After the Screaming Stops: Original Motion Picture Soundtrack

Studio album by David Rowntree & Ian Arber - Songs by Bros
- Released: 25 January 2019
- Recorded: 2017–18
- Genre: pop
- Length: 36:38
- Label: Lakeshore

Bros chronology
I Owe You Nothing: The Best of Bros (2011)	After the Screaming Stops (2019)

Composers David Rowntree and Ian Arber along with Michelle De Vries as music supervisor were in charge of the film's music and score. De Vries had previously collaborated with both directors Pearlman and Soutar. The soundtrack itself has only a few Bros tracks on the film, instead focusing more on the band's relationship. Some examples of pre-recorded tracks used in the film are "The Wanderer" by Dion, "Funky Broadway Parts 1 & 2" by Dyke and the Blazers, "Move" by Jess & James and "Brother" by Kodaline, due to the twins having been influenced by funk and soul when growing up. These tracks are heard in the film but not included in the commercial release. For the score Korg and Fairlight synthesizer sounds were also used for a slight 80s atmosphere.

In addition to the musical score, the soundtrack contains previously unreleased recordings by Bros, including a track from their live O2 Arena performance in August 2017. After the Screaming Stops: Original Motion Picture Soundtrack was released worldwide by Lakeshore Records on 25 January 2019, on digital download and announced by Lakeshore Records on various social media. It is the first soundtrack to include Bros (the subject of the film). The score was mixed by Richard Addis at Halo Post Production and highlights both Luke and Matt's story. The soundtrack album debuted at #28 on the Official UK Soundtrack Chart on week ending 7 February 2019.

=== Soundtrack ===
The original score for the film and Bros tracks:

After the Screaming Stops (Original Motion Picture Soundtrack)
No.	Title	Writer(s)	Length
1.	"Two Worlds Collide"	David Rowntree & Ian Arber	3:04
2.	"H.O.M.E."	David Rowntree & Ian Arber	2:03
3.	"The Thinking Man’s Reality Show"	David Rowntree & Ian Arber	1:45
4.	"After The Screaming Stops"	David Rowntree & Ian Arber	2:28
5.	"The Illusion of Pyros"	David Rowntree & Ian Arber	2:11
6.	"The Philosophy of Fools"	David Rowntree & Ian Arber	1:48
7.	"We Don't Have The Time Rome Had"	David Rowntree & Ian Arber	4:48
8.	"The End of Bros?"	David Rowntree & Ian Arber	1:49
9.	"20 Times Bitten"	David Rowntree & Ian Arber	2:23
10.	"Full of Light"	David Rowntree & Ian Arber	4:13
11.	"The Genesis of New Beginnings"	David Rowntree & Ian Arber	2:40
12.	"Two Rectangles, One Fortress"	David Rowntree & Ian Arber	2:11
13.	"When Will I Be Famous?, Live at the O2," (2017; previously unreleased from Push)	Nicky Graham, Tom Watkins	3:17
14.	"Garden of Forgiveness" (previously unreleased)	Bros	3:56
Total length:			36:38

== Release ==
The world premiere was screened out of competition on 22 September 2018 at the Fantastic Fest in Austin, Texas. The European premiere took place at the BFI London Film Festival on 17 October 2018. On 9 January 2019 it was announced that the documentary would have a screening at the Prince Charles Cinema on 28 February 2019 due to public request.

=== Marketing ===
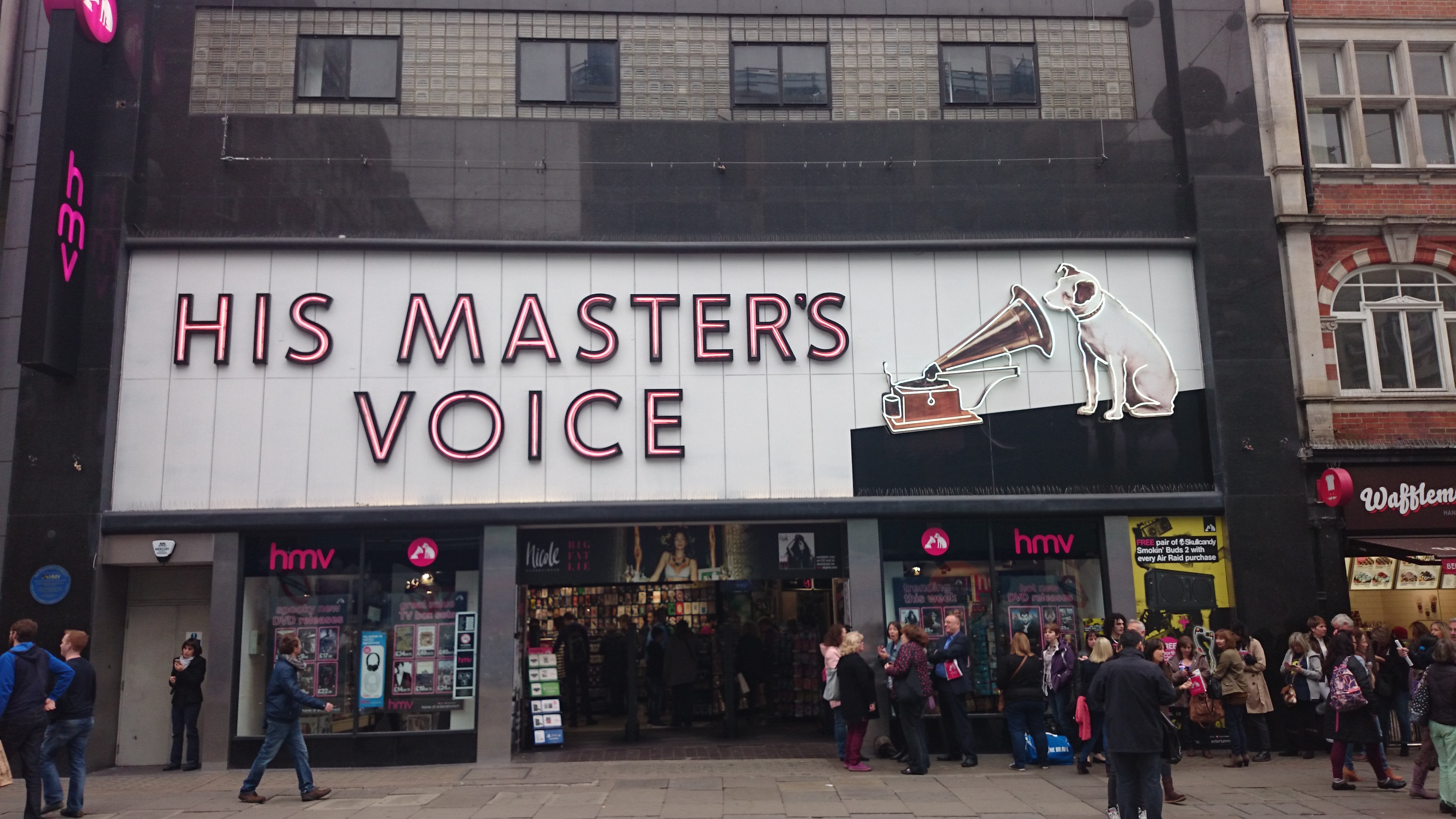
HMV in Oxford Street where Bros attended a signing for the film.

The official social media accounts including Twitter and Instagram promoted the documentary posting pictures and exclusive videos. On 5 September 2018 the official trailer was released on the film's YouTube account. On 14 October 2018, Bros were at HMV’s flagship store in Oxford Street, London, signing copies of the DVD sleeves prior to the film's release.

The film received a 15 certificate rating from the British Board of Film Classification.

=== Home media ===
After the Screaming Stops was released in the UK on digital download, DVD and Blu-ray on 12 November 2018 by Spirit Entertainment. The DVD and Blu-ray extra features include dinner with Bros, Luke choosing kit, Matt choosing guitar, an interview with ex-Bros bassist Craig Logan and trailer. The film debuted at #1 on the UK Official Music Video Chart on 18 November 2018, replacing Whitney by Whitney Houston, based on sales of DVDs and other physical formats.

In the United States it was released on DVD, Blu-ray, digital download and Video on demand (VOD) channels on 28 May 2019 by Gravitas Ventures. The Blu-ray/DVD omits the extra features available on the UK release.

=== Broadcast ===
In the United Kingdom, After the Screaming Stops was first broadcast on British television channel BBC Four and BBC Four HD simulcast at 10:00pm on 23 December 2018, around six weeks after the documentary's limited cinema release. The documentary was initially watched by more than 250,000 viewers, but later becomes one of the 2018 Christmas television highlights due to its popularity on BBC iPlayer. Due to the interest, it was aired again in January 2019 on BBC Two.

== Reception ==
=== Box office ===
As of 29 November 2018, Bros: After The Screaming Stops with a limited theatrical release, grossed £13,248 in the United Kingdom from 24 screens in its opening weekend, for a total gross of £13,248.

=== Critical response ===
The BBC critic Mark Kermode and The Sunday Times critic Edward Porter both likened Bros to the 1984 parody film This is Spinal Tap. Porter said some of the brothers' remarks were "unintentionally hilarious", but found them "ultimately lovable", and that the film "makes you poignantly aware of how testing their lives have been". He gave it four out of five. Kermode said the film was "really charming". Allan Hunter, writing for Screen International, said, "This documentary offers an access-all-areas pass during the countdown to the Bros reunion concert of 2017, but it can’t help but focus on the toxic relationship between siblings who sometimes make Cain and Abel seem like the best of chums. Initial interest may rest with nostalgic fans but there is a bigger story here with a wider emotional reach."

Time Out gave the film three out of five, saying it "captures these tensions with a candour rare in a pop doc." It added, "The filmmakers try to make the drama of dredging up their demons worth it for the thrill of performing again. After sitting through 90 minutes of them rowing, though, you have to wonder whether Matt and Luke’s candour and participation were really worth it.". The Guardian critic Peter Bradshaw described it as a "bizarre and perhaps unintentionally gripping promo-doc about the stressful reunion of 80s boyband Bros", giving it a rating of three out of five. For iNews, Adam Sherwin wrote "You don’t have to like Bros much to consider After the Screaming Stops, an unflinching document of the duo’s attempt to rebuild a relationship fractured after 30 years, one of the greatest music films of all time," giving it five out of five.

=== Awards and nominations ===
Award	Date of ceremony	Category	Recipient(s) and nominee(s)	Result	Ref(s)
British Academy Television Awards	12 May 2019	Specialist Factual	Bros: After the Screaming Stops	Nominated	
British Academy Television Craft Awards	28 April 2019	Director: Factual	David Soutar, Joe Pearlman	Nominated	
British Academy Television Craft Awards	28 April 2019	Editing: Factual	William Gilbey	Won	
Fantastic Fest	25 September 2018	Audience Award	Bros: After the Screaming Stops	3rd	
Grierson Awards	14 November 2019	Best Entertaining Documentary	Bros: After the Screaming Stops	Nominated	
National Film Awards UK	27 March 2019	Best Documentary 2019	After the Screaming Stops	Won	
Royal Television Society	17 March 2020	Arts	After the Screaming Stops	Won	

==== Vote nominations ====
On 20 March 2019 Bros: After the Screaming Stops won ‘Moment of the Year’ at the BBC Radio and Music Awards by public vote.

The Edinburgh Television Festival 2019: Won TV Moment of the Year: The English Conkers Crisis - Bros: After the Screaming Stops.

== Charts and certifications ==
=== Charts ===
Chart (2018–2019)	Peak position	Ref(s)
UK Official Music Video (OCC)	1	
UK Official Soundtrack Albums (OCC)	28	

== See also ==
- Bros
- List of British films of 2018
