= Molly Goddard =

British fashion designer (born 1988)

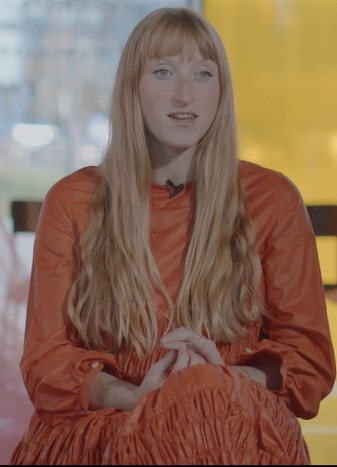
- Molly Goddard in 2017.
- Born: 16 December 1988 (age 37)
- Citizenship: British
- Education: Central Saint Martins
- Occupation: Fashion designer
- Years active: 2014–present
- Partner: Tom Shickle
- Children: 1
- Website: https://mollygoddard.com

Molly Goddard (born 16 December 1988) is a London-based, British fashion designer. She is best known for the voluminous, hand-smocked tulle dresses of her eponymous label.

== Early life ==
Goddard grew up in Ladbroke Grove, West London, and attended Holland Park School. Her mother, Sarah Edwards, is a photographer and set designer, and her father, Mark Goddard, a graphic designer and sculptor. Her sister, Alice Goddard, is a stylist who works on her shows. She studied knitwear at Central Saint Martins, completing a BA before leaving the MA course a year early, and intended to work for a fashion house rather than start her own brand. The label came about "accidentally" when, in September 2014, she and her boyfriend Tom Shickle threw a party during London Fashion Week with friends modeling her designs; Dover Street Market and the Hong Kong retailer I.T placed orders.

== Career ==
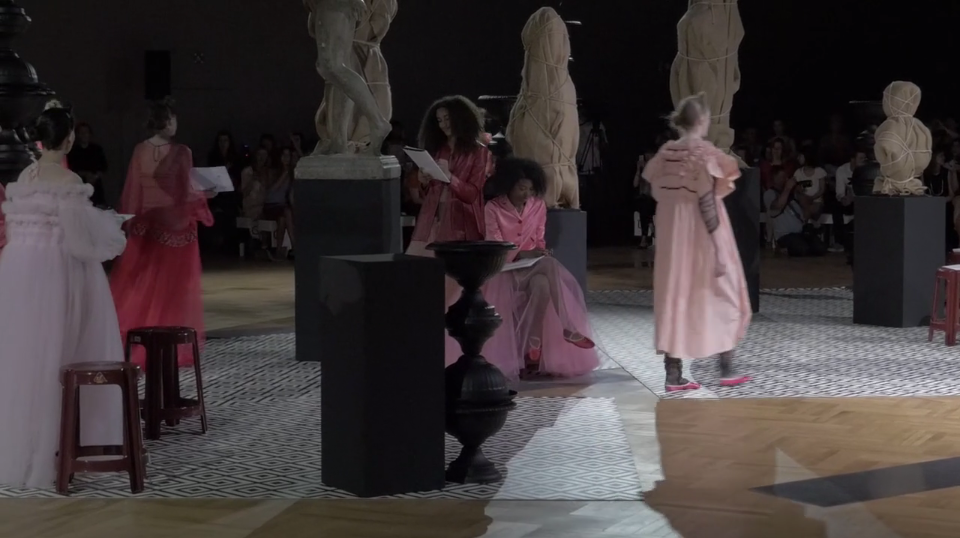
Molly Goddard 'Fashion in Motion' 'catwalk' at the V&A Museum

In 2016, Goddard was awarded the Emerging Talent award at The Fashion Awards and was shortlisted for the 2017 LVMH Prize. In May 2018, Goddard won the BFC/Vogue Designer Fashion Fund, winning the BFC Fashion Trust grant in May 2019.

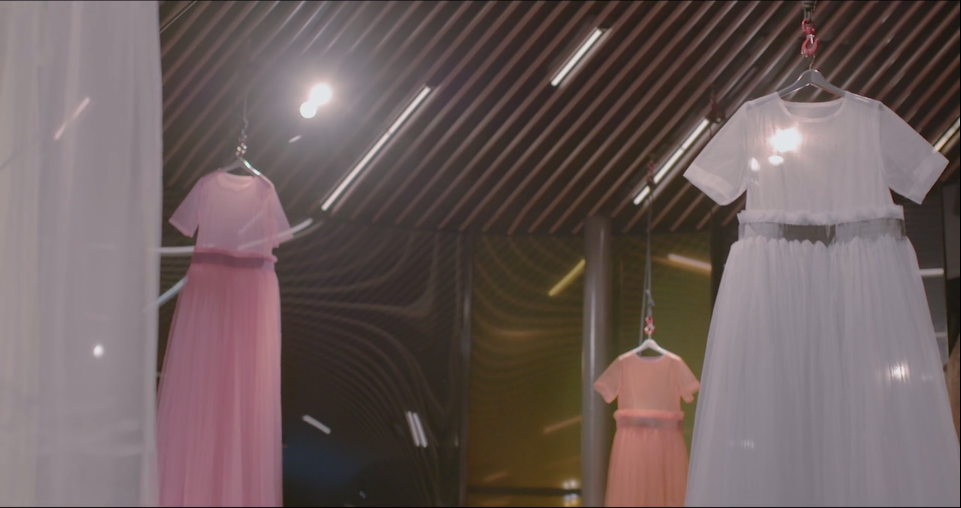
Molly Goddard 'What I Like' installation

In late 2016, her interactive installation "What I Like" at the NOW Gallery in Greenwich hung oversized replicas of her tulle dresses from the ceiling and invited visitors to embroider them. In July 2017, she presented a Fashion in Motion show at the Victoria and Albert Museum's newly opened Sainsbury Gallery, her first show outside the official fashion week calendar, staged with a set she created with her mother.

Goddard's work is built on fabric manipulation (pleating, gathering, and smocking) applied to inexpensive fabrics such as tulle and taffeta; she has said that costly fabric "bores" her, and that she prefers "something that's £6 a metre so you can pleat it and gather it". Vogue has called her one of the progenitors of fashion "waking up to feminism", noting that while "At first glance, her clothes may look frou-frou, [...] she likes them to have a subversive streak".

The success of her label in the United States has been attributed to singer Rihanna wearing her designs on red carpets since 2016, and celebrity muses, like model Edie Campbell, who first walked for Goddard in Spring/Summer 2018. More recently, Molly Goddard dresses featured in the BBC and BBC America television show Killing Eve on actress Jodie Comer, whose character Villanelle wears a pink tulle "Jack" dress from Goddard's Spring/Summer 2017 collection, her first runway show. In 2022, Harry Styles wore a Molly Goddard blouse on the cover of his album, Harry's House.

In 2019, she was one of the designers hired by the Metropolitan Museum of Art to create merchandise for the Met Gala and the museum's own 'Camp'-themed exhibit.

In March 2021, the label released a three-style footwear collaboration with Ugg (a floral-appliquéd boot, a shearling slipper, and a platform), first shown with its Spring/Summer 2021 collection. A bridal line followed in 2022. For Fall/Winter 2023, Goddard showed a stripped-back collection in her own East London studio, built around pieces she and her sister had coveted in their youth. Her Fall/Winter 2024 collection, shown in February 2024, paired her taffeta dresses with western-inspired pieces drawn from vintage children's clothing.

== Personal life ==
Goddard has a son, born in 2021, with her partner Tom Shickle, who played bass in the band Spector.

== See also ==
- Villanelle's pink Molly Goddard dress
