= Mood board =

Visual presentation to convey a general idea

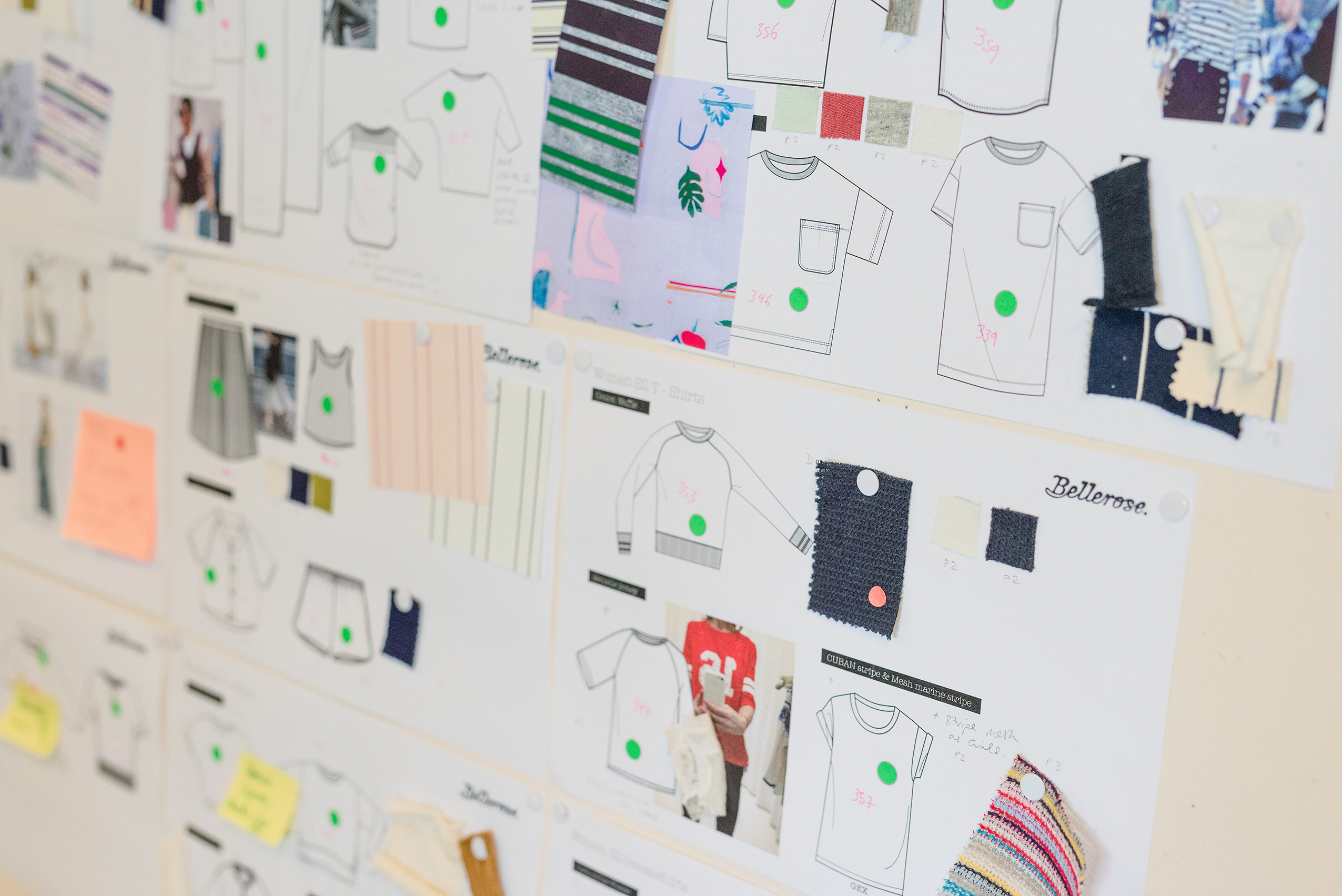
Mood board of technical design drawings, colour references and fabric samples.

A mood board is a type of visual presentation or 'collage' consisting of images, text, and samples of objects in a composition. It can be based on a set topic or can be any material chosen at random. A mood board can be used to convey a general idea or feeling about a particular topic. They may be physical or digital, and can be effective presentation tools.

== Uses ==
Graphic designers, interior designers, industrial designers, photographers, user interface designers and other creative artists use mood boards to visually illustrate the style they wish to pursue. Amateur and professional designers alike may use them as an aid for more subjective purposes such as how they want to decorate their bedroom, or the vibe they want to convey through their fashion.

Mood boards can also be used by authors to visually explain a certain style of writing, or an imaginary setting for a story line. In short, mood boards are not limited to interior decorating purposes, but serve as a visual tool to quickly inform others of the overall "feel" (or "flow") of an idea. In creative processes, mood boards can balance coordination and creative freedom.

Mood boards can be used in marketing for advertisements and branding. They are used to help creative teams stay on the same page while also adhering to the image that the brand wants to project outward. They can also be helpful for sticking to a specific creative concept when creating a series of ads.

== Types ==
One way of creating a mood board is using a foam board which can be cut up with a scalpel and can also have spray mounted cut-outs put onto it. Cardboard, paper, and cork-board can also be used as an alternative base for a mood board. Some examples of ideas used to convey a mood are food, music, and colors. Mood boards can be decorated with string, stickers, pretty tape, magazine pictures, original art, original pictures, and fabrics, as well as any other decoration that happens to inspire the creator. They can take the form of various shapes and sizes.

Creating mood boards in a digital form allows for easier collaboration and modification. They can be created with digital design software, such as Adobe Creative Cloud Express and Figma, or online via sites such as Pinterest. Users of these platforms often use images that others have shared online to create a vision that they might not have necessarily been able to create themselves with the physical objects around them.

== See also ==
- Scrapbooking
- Concept art
- Aesthetics
