= British Academy Television Awards =

Annual British television awards

BAFTA Television Awards
- Current: 2026 British Academy Television Awards
- British Academy Television Awards logo
- Awarded for: The best in television
- Country: United Kingdom
- First award: 1955; 71 years ago
- Website: bafta.org

British Academy Television Awards, or the BAFTA TV Awards are presented in an annual award show hosted by the British Academy of Film and Television Arts. They have been awarded annually since 1955. The BAFTA TV Awards are recognised internationally as the highest honour in British and world television, equivalent to the BAFTA Film Awards for cinema, Laurence Olivier Awards for theatre, and the BRIT Awards for music. The BAFTA TV Awards are considered equivalent to the Emmy Awards.

== Background ==
The first-ever Awards, given in 1955, consisted of six categories. Until 1958, they were awarded by the Guild of Television Producers and Directors. From 1958 onwards, after the Guild had merged with the British Film Academy, the organisation was known as the Society of Film and Television Arts. In 1976, this became the British Academy of Film and Television Arts.

From 1968 until 1997, the BAFTA Film and Television awards were presented in one joint ceremony known simply as the BAFTA Awards, but in order to streamline the ceremonies from 1998 onwards they were split in two. The Television Awards are usually presented in April, with a separate ceremony for the Television Craft Awards on a different date. The Craft Awards are presented for more technical areas of the industry, such as special effects, production design, or costumes.

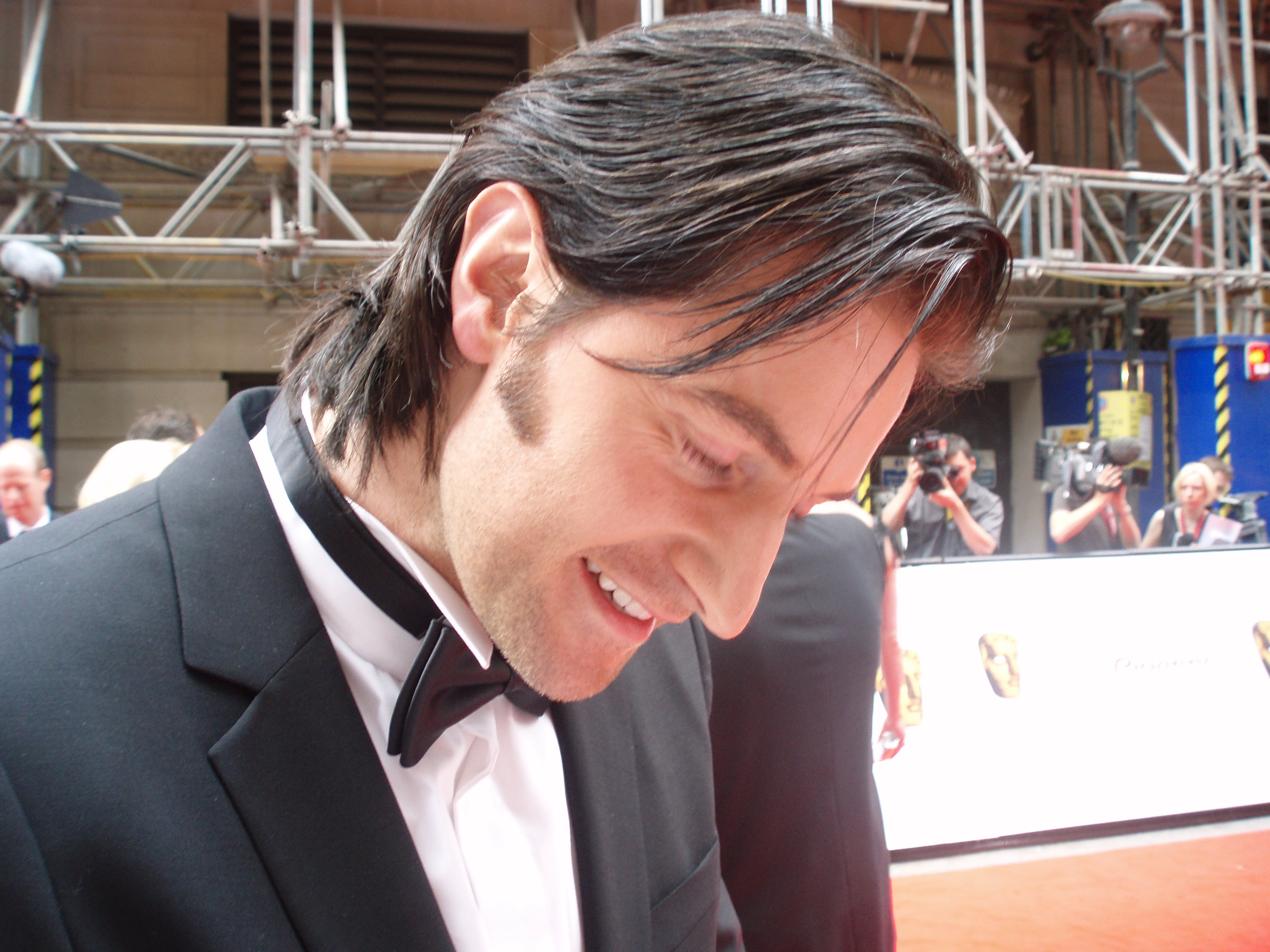
Richard Armitage attending the British Academy Television Awards in 2007.

The Awards are only open to British programmes—with the exception of the discontinued audience-voted Audience Award and the International Award (this is for a single programme or series acquired from the international marketplace, covering all genres)—but any cable, satellite, terrestrial or digital television stations broadcasting in the UK are eligible to submit entries, as are independent production companies who have produced programming for the channels. Individual performances, such as from actors, can either be entered by the performers themselves or by the broadcasters. The programmes being entered must have been broadcast on or between January and December of the preceding year to be eligible for the year's awards. Entry is free, and entry forms are made available between November and January each year.

After all the entries have been received, they are voted for online by all eligible members of the Academy. The programmes and performances attracting the most votes, usually four in each category, are shortlisted as the nominees for each award. The winner is chosen from the four nominees by a special jury of nine academy members for each award, the members of each jury selected by the Academy's Television Committee. Each jury is designed to have a balance in areas such as sex, age and experience, and have experience related to the categories concerned but no direct connections to the short-listed programmes or performers.

There are also a number of non-competitive honorary Awards—the Dennis Potter Award for Outstanding Writing for Television; the Alan Clarke Award for Outstanding Creative Contribution to Television; the Richard Dimbleby Award for Outstanding Presenter in the Factual Arena; the Fellowship for individuals who have made an outstanding contribution to television across their careers, and various Special Awards given on an ad hoc basis. These Awards are suggested by the Television Committee and awarded by the Academy's Council. They are not necessarily always given every year, but as and when appropriate.

The Awards ceremony is broadcast on British television, usually the day after it has taken place. Between 1998 and 2006, it was alternated between ITV and BBC One. But since 2007, it has been broadcast by BBC One.

They are the equivalent of the Primetime Emmy Awards in the United States.

=== "Baftagate" ===
In 1991, a controversial selection was made in the Best Drama Serial category, when Prime Suspect beat G.B.H. to win the award. Following the ceremony, four of the seven voting members of the jury signed a public statement declaring that they had voted for G.B.H. to win. Jury chairwoman Irene Shubik, who did not cast a vote, refused to comment publicly on the affair, but BAFTA Chairman Richard Price stated that the ballot papers passed on to him by Shubik had shown four votes for Prime Suspect and three for G.B.H. Price claimed that the ballot papers could not be recounted as they had subsequently been destroyed. No blame was ever attached to Shubik by the four judges, and it was to her that they had initially turned to raise the apparent discrepancy with BAFTA.

== Categories ==
The main competitive award categories presented every year are:

=== Awards in the gift of the Academy ===
- Fellowship
- Special Award
- Writer Award
- Most Important Contribution On-Screen in Factual Television

=== Production Categories ===
- Best Single Drama: A drama where one self-contained story is told in a single one-off episode, equivalent to a television movie.
- Best Mini-Series: A drama that tells a complete story and is not intended to return.
- Best Drama Series: A drama which consists of several episodes, that is intended to return.
- Best Soap and Continuing Drama: A drama which transmits a minimum of twenty episodes per year.
- Best International Programme
- Best Factual Series or Strand: More than one factual programme linked through a unified approach, narrative or the thematic development of a subject matter.
- Best Specialist Factual: Specifically for arts, history, natural history or science programs or series, either factual or performance-based.
- Best Single Documentary: For a one-off documentary not presented as part of a regular series.
- Best Features: For programmes not included in any other category, for example cookery, gardening, lifestyle or discussion programmes.
- Best Daytime: For programmes that air on terrestrial channels eg. BBC One, ITV etc. from 6:00AM 'till 6:00PM.
- Best Reality and Constructed Factual: For programmes where participants are put into an environment or format and then observed interacting in situations devised by the producer.
- Best Short Form
- Best Current Affairs: For single films, or films from a strand that are primarily concerned with unfolding current affairs.
- Best News Coverage: For an individual news programme in its entirety, or up to one hour's unedited. material from a rolling news channel.
- Best Live Event
- Best Sport
- Best Entertainment Programme: Includes variety shows, game shows, quizzes, talent shows, and all general entertainment programmes.
- Best Comedy Entertainment Program: Includes panel-led shows, chat shows where comic content plays a big part, stand-up and comedy clip shows.
- Best Scripted Comedy: For sitcoms.
- Best Actor
- Best Actress
- Best Supporting Actor
- Best Supporting Actress
- Best Entertainment Performance
- Best Female Comedy Performance
- Best Male Comedy Performance

=== Other Categories ===
- Virgin TV's Must See Moment

=== Discontinued Categories ===
- Audience Award: Awarded from 2000 to 2016.
- Best Comedy Performance: Divided in 2010 into female performance and male performance.
- Children's Programme – Documentary-Educational: Awarded from 1983 to 1996.
- Children's Programme – Entertainment-Drama: Awarded from 1983 to 1996.
- Short Animation: Awarded from 1984 to 1991.
- Talk Show: Awarded in 1996 and 1997.
- Richard Dimbleby for The Best Presenter – Factual, Features and News: Awarded from 2000 to 2002.
- Single Play: Awarded from 1973 to 1982.

=== Records ===
- Adolescence holds the record for the most wins in a single night by a television series, with four (achieved in 2026).
- EastEnders holds the record for the most programme awards, with 11 for Best Soap and Continuing Drama. It and Coronation Street have each been nominated for the award 23 times, the most nominations for programme awards.

== Ceremonies ==
Event	Date	Venue	Host
30th	March 25, 1984	Grosvenor House Hotel	Michael Aspel
31st	March 5, 1985	Grosvenor House Hotel	Terry Wogan
32nd	March 16, 1986	Grosvenor House Hotel	Michael Aspel
33rd	March 22, 1987	Grosvenor House Hotel	Ronnie Corbett and Ronnie Barker
34th	March 20, 1988	Grosvenor House Hotel	Michael Aspel and Selina Scott
35th	March 19, 1989	Grosvenor House Hotel	Anna Ford and David Dimbleby
36th	March 18, 1990	Grosvenor House Hotel	Michael Aspel
37th	March 17, 1991	Grosvenor House Hotel	Noel Edmonds
38th	March 22, 1992	London Palladium	Michael Aspel
39th	March 21, 1993	Theatre Royal, Drury Lane	Griff Rhys Jones
40th	April 15, 1994	Theatre Royal, Drury Lane	Sheena McDonald
41st	April 23, 1995	London Palladium	Billy Connolly
42nd	April 21, 1996	Theatre Royal, Drury Lane	Angus Deayton
43rd	April 29, 1997	Royal Albert Hall	Lenny Henry
44th	May 18, 1998	Prince of Wales Theatre	Bob Monkhouse
45th	May 9, 1999	Grosvenor House Hotel	Michael Parkinson (Note: Parkinson was due to share hosting duties with Jill Dando until her murder two weeks earlier.)
46th	May 14, 2000	Grosvenor House Hotel	Des Lynam
47th	May 13, 2001	Grosvenor House Hotel	Angus Deayton
48th	April 21, 2002	Theatre Royal, Drury Lane	Chris Tarrant
49th	April 13, 2003	The Dorchester	Anne Robinson
50th	April 18, 2004	Grosvenor House Hotel	Davina McCall
51st	April 17, 2005	Theatre Royal, Drury Lane	Graham Norton
52nd	May 7, 2006	Grosvenor House Hotel	Davina McCall
53rd	May 20, 2007	London Palladium	Graham Norton
54th	April 20, 2008	London Palladium	Graham Norton
55th	April 26, 2009	Royal Festival Hall	Graham Norton
56th	June 6, 2010	London Palladium	Graham Norton
57th	May 22, 2011	Grosvenor House Hotel	Graham Norton
58th	May 27, 2012	Royal Festival Hall	Dara Ó Briain
59th	May 12, 2013	Royal Festival Hall	Graham Norton
60th	May 18, 2014	Theatre Royal, Drury Lane	Graham Norton
61st	May 10, 2015	Theatre Royal, Drury Lane	Graham Norton
62nd	May 8, 2016	Royal Festival Hall	Graham Norton
63rd	May 14, 2017	Royal Festival Hall	Sue Perkins
64th	May 13, 2018	Royal Festival Hall	Sue Perkins
65th	May 12, 2019	Royal Festival Hall	Graham Norton
66th	July 31, 2020	Television Centre, London	Richard Ayoade
67th	June 6, 2021	Television Centre, London	Richard Ayoade
68th	May 8, 2022	Royal Festival Hall	Richard Ayoade
69th	May 14, 2023	Royal Festival Hall	Rob Beckett and Romesh Ranganathan
70th	May 12, 2024	Royal Festival Hall	Rob Beckett and Romesh Ranganathan
71st	May 11, 2025	Royal Festival Hall	Alan Cumming
72nd	May 10, 2026	Royal Festival Hall	Greg Davies

== See also ==
- British Academy of Film and Television Arts
- British Academy Film Awards
- British Academy Television Craft Awards
- British Academy Games Awards
- National Television Awards
- Emmy Awards
- Critics' Choice Television Awards
