= British Academy Television Award for Best Live Event =

Annual UK television award

British Academy Television Award
- Country: United Kingdom
- Presented by: British Academy of Film and Television Arts
- First award: 1964
- Currently held by: VE Day 80: A Celebration to Remember (2026)
- Website: http://www.bafta.org/

The British Academy Television Award for Best Live Event is one of the major categories of the British Academy Television Awards (BAFTAs), the primary awards ceremony of the British television industry. According to the BAFTA website, the category is for "the television coverage of a live event."

The category has gone through several changes:

- An individual award (occasionally with nominees) named Best Outside Broadcasts was presented from 1964 to 1968 and in 1977.
- From 1986 to 1991, the category was merged with the Best News Coverage category, being presented as Best News or Outside Broadcast Coverage.
- From 1995 to 1997 it was presented as Best Sports/Events Coverage in Real Time.
- In 1998 and 1999 it was awarded as Best Live Outside Broadcast Coverage.
- From 2012 to 2015, the category for sport evens was merged with the Best Sport category being awarded under the name Best Sport and Live Event.
- Since 2016, the category is presented as a stand-alone category, separate from the Best Sport category.

== Winners and nominees ==
=== 1960s ===
Best Outside Broadcasts

Year	Title	Recipient(s)
1964	Antony Craxton	
1965	Dennis Monger	
1966	The State Funeral of Sir Winston Churchill; LSO - The Music Men	Peter Morley
1966	Men Against the Matterhorn; Cup Winners Cup Final: "West Ham v Munich"; England v Scotland	Alan Chivers, Walther Pluess
1966	The Lying-in-State and The State Funeral of Sir Winston Churchill; NATO Conference; Festival of Remembrance at Cenotaph	Antony Craxton
1966	Victory in Europe - 20 Years After; Half Time Britain; Science Special; Challenge; Tomorrow's World	Glyn Jones
1967	Grandstand: "World Cup"	
1968	Alan Chivers, Christopher Brasher	

=== 1970s ===
Best Outside Broadcasts

Year	Title	Recipient(s)
1977	1976 FA Cup final	
1977	Match of the Day	
1977	St Nicholas Cantata	Margery Baker
1977	The State Opening of Parliament	
1977	Wimbledon 1976	

=== 1990s ===
Best Sports/Events Coverage in Real Time

Year	Title	Recipient(s)
1995	The Grand National	Keith MacKenzie, Martin Hopkins
1995	Arnhem 50th Anniversary: Out of Ammunition	Michael Begg
1995	D-Day Remembered: Beaches of Normandy and the Bayeux Service of Remembrance	Neil Eccles, Stephen Morris
1995	UEFA Cup: "Aston Villa v Inter Milan"	Mike Inman, John Watts
1996	VE Day Coverage	Peter Hylton Cleaver, Neil Eccles, Philip S. Gilbert and Team
1996	Cheltenham Gold Cup	Jane Garrod
1996	Super Sunday: "The Final Day of the Premiership"	Andy Melvin, Tony Mills
1996	VJ-50 Live: The Final Tribute	Neil Eccles, Simon Betts, Philip S Gilbert
1997	BBC1 Euro '96 Coverage	Niall Sloane, Vivien Kent
1997	Formula 1 Grand Prix Racing	Jim Reside, Keith MacKenzie
1997	Monday Night Football	Andy Melvin, Tony Mills
1997	Remembrance Sunday: The Cenotaph	Peter Cleaver

Best Live Outside Broadcast Coverage

Year	Title	Recipient(s)
1998	Sky Rugby Union	Martin Turner
1998	The Grand National	Malcolm Kemp, Martin Hopkins, Dave Gordon
1998	Hong Kong Handover: The Final Moment	Philip Gilbert, Neil Eccles, Geoff Wilson and the BBC Events Production Team
1998	ITV Coverage of the Grand Prix	Neil Duncanson, Keith McKenzie
1999	Channel 4 Racing: "Derby Day"	Andrew Franklin, Denise Large
1999	The Eurovision Song Contest	Guy Freeman, Geoff Posner
1999	The Football World Cup Final Programme	Paul McNamara, Niall Sloane
1999	World Cup '98: "England v Argentina"	Jeff Farmer, Rick Waumsley, John Watts

=== 2010s ===
Best Sport and Live Event

Year	Title	Recipient(s)	Broadcaster
2012	The Royal Wedding		BBC One
2012	Frankenstein's Wedding: Live in Leeds	Meredith Chambers, Pat Connor, Richard Fell, Eleanor Moran	BBC Three
2012	Rugby World Cup Final	Phil Heslop, Paul McNamara, Tony Pastor, Roger Pearce	ITV
2012	Tour de France 2011	Steve Docherty, Gary Imlach, James Venner, Carolyn Viccari	ITV4
2013	The London 2012 Paralympic Games		Channel 4
2013	The London 2012 Olympics: "Super Saturday"		BBC One
2013	The London 2012 Olympic Opening Ceremony: Isle of Wonder		BBC One
2013	Wimbledon 2012: "Men's Final"		BBC One
2014	The Ashes 2013: "1st Test, Day 5"		Sky Sports
2014	Wimbledon Men's Final		BBC One/BBC Sport
2014	Glastonbury 2013		BBC
2014	Bollywood Carmen Live		BBC Three
2015	WW1 Remembered – From the Battlefield & Westminster Abbey		BBC Two
2015	2014 FA Cup Semi Final: Hull City v Sheffield United		BT Sport 1
2015	Monty Python (Mostly) Live: One Down, Five to Go		Gold
2015	Tour de France, 2014, Stage 1	Steve Docherty, Carolyn Viccari, James Venner, Gary Imlach	ITV

Best Live Event

Year	Title	Recipient(s)	Broadcaster
2016	Big Blue Live		BBC One
2016	The Sound of Music Live!		ITV
2016	Stargazing Live: "Brit in Space, Tim Peake Special"		BBC Two
2016	The Vote	David Clews, James Graham, Tony Grech-Smith, Josie Rourke	More4
2017	The Queen's 90th Birthday Celebration		ITV
2017	The Centenary of the Battle of the Somme: Thiepval		BBC One
2017	Shakespeare Live! from the RSC		BBC Two
2017	Stand Up to Cancer		Channel 4
2018	World War One Remembered: Passchendaele		BBC Two
2018	ITV News Election 2017: The Results		ITV
2018	One Love Manchester		BBC One
2018	Wild Alaska Live		BBC One
2019	The Royal British Legion Festival of Remembrance		BBC One
2019	Open Heart Surgery: Live		Channel 5
2019	The Royal Wedding: Prince Harry and Meghan Markle		Channel 4
2019	Stand Up to Cancer	Suzi Aplin, Andrew Charles Smith, Murray James, Gabe Turner	Channel 4

=== 2020s ===
Year	Title	Recipient(s)	Broadcaster
2020	Blue Planet Live		BBC One
2020	Election 2019 Live: The Results		ITV
2020	Glastonbury 2019		BBC Two
2020	Operation Live		Channel 5
2021	Springwatch 2020		BBC Two
2021	Life Drawing Live!	Emyr Afan, Sally Dixon, Josie d'Arby, Lachlan Goudie, Diana Ali, Nicky Philipps	BBC Four
2021	The Royal British Legion Festival of Remembrance		BBC One
2021	The Third Day: Autumn		Sky Arts
2022	The Earthshot Prize 2021		BBC One
2022	The Brit Awards 2021		ITV
2022	The Royal British Legion Festival of Remembrance		BBC One
2022	Springwatch 2021		BBC Two
2023	Platinum Jubilee: Party at the Palace		BBC One
2023	Concert for Ukraine	Guy Freeman, Richard Valentine, Anouk Fontaine, Tom Cuckson, Laura Djanogly, Jen Bollom	ITV
2023	The State Funeral of HM Queen Elizabeth II		BBC One

Best Live Event Coverage

Year	Title	Recipient(s)	Broadcaster
2024	Eurovision Song Contest 2023		BBC One
2024	The Coronation Concert		BBC One
2024	Royal British Legion Festival of Remembrance		BBC One
2025	Glastonbury 2024		BBC Two
2025	D-Day 80: Tribute to the Fallen		BBC One
2025	Last Night of the Proms		BBC Two
2026	VE Day 80: A Celebration to Remember		BBC One
2026	Holocaust Memorial Day 2025		BBC One
2026	Last Night of the Proms: Finale		BBC One

- Note: The series that don't have recipients on the tables had Production team credited as recipients for the award or nomination.
