= British Academy Television Award for Best Reality and Constructed Factual =

Annual UK television award

British Academy Television Award
- Country: United Kingdom
- Presented by: British Academy of Film and Television Arts
- First award: 2012
- Currently held by: The Celebrity Traitors (2026)

Highlights
- Most wins: Gogglebox (2)
- Website: http://www.bafta.org/

The British Academy Television Award for Best Reality and Constructed Factual is one of the major categories of the British Academy Television Awards (BAFTAs), the primary awards ceremony of the British television industry.

According to the BAFTA website, the category is for "programmes where participants are put into an environment or format and then observed interacting in situations devised by the producer."

== Winners and nominees ==
=== 2010s ===
Year	Title	Recipient(s)	Broadcaster
2012	Young Apprentice	Andy Devonshire, Darina Healy, Michele Kurland, Colm Martin	BBC One
2012	Made in Chelsea	Sarah Dillistone, David Granger, Sharyn Mills, John Pereira	E4
2012	Don't Tell the Bride	Rebecca Bayatti, Sarah May, Jon Rowlands, Steph Weatherill	BBC Three
2012	An Idiot Abroad		Sky One
2013	Made in Chelsea		E4
2013	The Audience	Jonathan Smith, Nick Curwin, Danny Horan, Anthony Philipson	Channel 4
2013	The Young Apprentice	Claudia Lewis, Laurence Turnbull, Ruby Evans, Alan Sugar	BBC One
2013	I'm a Celebrity...Get Me Out of Here!	Richard Cowles, Becca Walker, Chris Brogden	ITV
2014	Gogglebox	Tania Alexander, Paul Broadbent, Chantal Boyle, Stephen Lambert	Channel 4
2014	Dragons' Den	Ceri Aston, Steven Handley, Paul Newton, Helen Lagoe	BBC Three
2014	The Undateables	Luke Sewell, Sarah Spencer, Amelia Hann, Liz Warner	Channel 4
2014	The Big Reunion		ITV2
2015	The Island with Bear Grylls		Channel 4
2015	The Apprentice	Alan Sugar, Francesca Maudslay, Cate Hall, Stephen Day	BBC One
2015	I'm a Celebrity...Get Me Out of Here!		ITV
2015	The Undateables	Sarah Spencer, Martha Constable, Liz Warner	Channel 4
2016	First Dates	Nicola Lloyd, Martin Conway, Adam Chapman, Rob Clifford	Channel 4
2016	I'm a Celebrity...Get Me Out of Here!		ITV
2016	Gogglebox	Stephen Lambert, Tania Alexander	Channel 4
2016	The Secret Life of 4, 5 and 6 Year Olds	Teresa Watkins, Nicola Brown, Emily Lawson, Harjeet Chhokar	Channel 4
2017	Muslims Like Us	Kieran Smith, Nicholas Packer, Oliver Manley, Mobeen Azhar	BBC Two
2017	First Dates		Channel 4
2017	The Secret Life of 5 Year Olds		Channel 4
2017	The Real Marigold Hotel	Tom Currie, David Vallance, David Clews, Andrew Mackenzie-Betty	BBC Two
2018	Love Island		ITV2
2018	The Real Full Monty	Nick Bullen, Kevin Mundye, Daniela Neumann, Will Yapp	ITV
2018	Celebrity Hunted		Channel 4
2018	Old People's Home for 4 Year Olds	Trish Powell, Murray Boland, Benjamin Leigh, Belle Borgeaud	Channel 4
2019	I'm a Celebrity...Get Me Out of Here!		ITV
2019	Dragon's Den		BBC Two
2019	Old People's Home for 4 Year Olds	Murray Boland, Trish Powell, Benjamin Leigh, Louise Bartmann	Channel 4
2019	The Real Full Monty: Ladies' Night		ITV

=== 2020s ===
Year	Title	Recipient(s)	Broadcaster
2020	Race Across the World		BBC Two
2020	Celebrity Gogglebox	Tania Alexander, Leon Campbell, Stephen Lambert, Chris Hooker	Channel 4
2020	Harry's Heroes: The Full English		ITV
2020	RuPaul's Drag Race UK		BBC Three
2021	The School that Tried to End Racism		Channel 4
2021	MasterChef: The Professionals	David Ambler, Katie Attwood, Genevieve Welch, Anthony Crumpton	BBC One
2021	The Write Offs		Channel 4
2021	Race Across the World		BBC Two
2022	Gogglebox		Channel 4
2022	The Dog House		Channel 4
2022	Married at First Sight UK	Murray Boland, Dermot Caulfield, Danielle Lux, Sharyn Mills, Rachel Viner, James Kayler	E4
2022	RuPaul's Drag Race UK	RuPaul Charles, Fenton Bailey, Tom Campbell, Bruce McCoy, Sally Miles, Matt Green	BBC Three
2023	The Traitors		BBC One
2023	RuPaul's Drag Race UK	RuPaul Charles, Fenton Bailey, Tom Campbell, Bruce McCoy, Matt Green, Tony Grech-Smith	BBC Three
2023	Freddie Flintoff's Field of Dreams	Andrew Mackenzie-Betty, Naomi Templeton, Cath Tudor	BBC One
2023	We Are Black and British	Narinder Minhas, Becky Clarke, Lindsay Davies, Rebecca Nunn, Ryan Samuda, Jessica Mitchell	BBC Two

Best Reality

Year	Title	Recipient(s)	Broadcaster
2024	Squid Game: The Challenge		Netflix
2024	Banged Up		Channel 4
2024	Married at First Sight UK	Danielle Lux, Murray Boland, Rachel Viner, Susy Price, James Kayler, Dermot Caulfield	E4
2024	My Mum, Your Dad		ITV1
2025	The Jury: Murder Trial		Channel 4
2025	Dragons' Den		BBC One
2025	The Traitors		BBC One
2025	Love is Blind UK		Netflix
2026	The Celebrity Traitors		BBC One
2026	The Jury: Murder Trial		Channel 4
2026	Squid Game: The Challenge		Netflix
2026	Virgin Island	Rob Davis, Tom Garland, Joe Wildman, Matt Bailey, Sarah Carnie, Mel Walden	Channel 4

- Note: The series that don't have recipients on the tables had Production team credited as recipients for the award or nomination.

== Programmes with multiple wins and nominations ==
=== Multiple Awards ===
2 awards

- Gogglebox

=== Multiple Nominations ===
4 nominations

- Gogglebox/Celebrity Gogglebox
- I'm a Celebrity...Get Me Out of Here!

3 nominations

- Dragons' Den
- RuPaul's Drag Race UK
- The Traitors/The Celebrity Traitors

2 nominations

- First Dates
- The Jury: Murder Trial
- Made in Chelsea
- Married at First Sight UK
- Old People's Home for 4 Year Olds
- Race Across the World
- The Real Full Monty
- Squid Game: The Challenge
- The Undateables
- Young Apprentice
