= British Academy Television Audience Award =

Television award category

British Academy Television Award
- Country: United Kingdom
- Presented by: British Academy of Film and Television Arts
- First award: 2000
- Final award: 2016
- Website: http://www.bafta.org/

The British Academy Television Audience Award was awarded annually as part of the British Academy Television Awards. The category was created in 2000 and was last awarded in 2016, before being replaced by the British Academy Television Award for Virgin TV's Must-See Moment. It was the only award voted by the public.

== Winners and nominees ==
=== 2000s ===
Year	Programme	Broadcaster
2000	A Touch of Frost	ITV
2000	dinnnerladies	BBC One
2000	Ground Force	BBC One
2000	The Vicar of Dibley	BBC One
2000	Walking with Dinosaurs	BBC One
2001	Inspector Morse – The Remorseful Day	ITV
2001	Hero of the Hour	ITV
2001	Seeing Red	ITV
2001	A Touch of Frost	ITV
2001	The Vicar of Dibley	BBC One
2005	Green Wing	Channel 4
2005	Shameless	Channel 5
2005	This World: One Day of War	BBC Two
2005	Who Do You Think You Are?	BBC Two
2006	Doctor Who	BBC One
2006	The Apprentice	BBC Two
2006	Bleak House	BBC One
2006	The Catherine Tate Show	BBC Two
2006	Desperate Housewives	Channel 4
2006	Jamie's School Dinners	Channel 4
2006	Strictly Come Dancing	BBC One
2006	The X Factor	ITV
2007	Life on Mars	BBC One
2007	The Royale Family: Queen of Sheba	BBC One
2007	Dragons' Den	BBC Two
2007	The Vicar of Dibley Christmas Special	BBC One
2007	Planet Earth	BBC One
2007	Celebrity Big Brother	Channel 4
2008	Gavin & Stacey	BBC Three
2008	The Apprentice	BBC Two
2008	Andrew Marr's History of Modern Britain	BBC Two
2008	Britain's Got Talent	ITV
2008	Cranford	BBC One
2008	Strictly Come Dancing	BBC One
2009	Skins	E4
2009	The Apprentice	BBC Two
2009	Coronation Street	ITV
2009	Outnumbered	BBC One
2009	Wallander	BBC One
2009	The X Factor	ITV

=== 2010s ===
Year	Programme	Broadcaster
2010	The Inbetweeners	E4
2010	Britain's Got Talent	ITV
2010	Glee	E4
2010	The One Show	BBC One
2010	The X Factor	ITV
2010	Unforgiven	ITV
2011	The Only Way Is Essex	ITV2
2011	Big Fat Gypsy Weddings	Channel 4
2011	Downton Abbey	ITV1
2011	The Killing	BBC Four
2011	Miranda	BBC Two
2011	Sherlock	BBC One
2012	Celebrity Juice	ITV2
2012	Educating Essex	Channel 4
2012	Fresh Meat	Channel 4
2012	Frozen Planet	BBC One
2012	Sherlock	BBC One
2012	The Great British Bake Off	BBC Two
2013	Game of Thrones	Sky Atlantic
2013	Call the Midwife	BBC One
2013	The Great British Bake Off	BBC Two
2013	Homeland	Channel 4
2013	The London 2012 Olympic Opening Ceremony	BBC One
2013	Strictly Come Dancing	BBC One
2014	Doctor Who : "The Day of the Doctor"	BBC One
2014	Breaking Bad	Netflix
2014	Broadchurch	ITV
2014	Educating Yorkshire	Channel 4
2014	Gogglebox	Channel 4
2014	The Great British Bake Off	BBC Two
2015	Sherlock	BBC One
2015	Cilla	ITV
2015	EastEnders	BBC One
2015	Game of Thrones	Sky Atlantic
2015	The Great British Bake Off	BBC One
2015	The Missing	BBC One
2015	Strictly Come Dancing	BBC One
2016	Poldark	BBC One
2016	Doctor Foster	BBC One
2016	The Great British Bake Off	BBC One
2016	Humans	Channel 4
2016	Making a Murderer	Netflix
2016	Peter Kay's Car Share	BBC iPlayer

== Shows with multiple wins and nominations ==
=== Multiple wins ===
The following shows have been awarded the British Academy Television Award for Actor multiple times:

2 wins

- Doctor Who

=== Multiple nominations ===
The following shows have been nominated for the British Academy Television Award for Actor multiple times:

5 nominations

- The Great British Bake Off

4 nominations

- Strictly Come Dancing

3 nominations

- The Apprentice
- Sherlock
- The Vicar of Dibley
- The X Factor

2 nominations

- A Touch of Frost
- Doctor Who
- Educating...
- Game of Thrones
