= British Academy Television Award for Best Sport =

Annual UK television award

British Academy Television Award
- Country: United Kingdom
- Presented by: British Academy of Film and Television Arts
- First award: 1964
- Currently held by: UEFA Women's Euro 2025 (2026)
- Website: http://www.bafta.org/

The British Academy Television Award for Best Sport is one of the major categories of the British Academy Television Awards (BAFTAs), the primary awards ceremony of the British television industry. According to the BAFTA website, the category is for "the television coverage of a sporting event."

The category has gone through several changes:

- An individual award (occasionally with nominees) named Best Outside Broadcasts was presented from 1964 to 1968 and in 1977.
- From 1986 to 1991, the category was merged with the Best News Coverage category, being presented as Best News or Outside Broadcast Coverage.
- From 1995 to 1997, it was presented as Best Sports/Events Coverage in Real Time.
- In 1998 and 1999, it was awarded as Best Live Outside Broadcast Coverage.
- From 2012 to 2015, the category for sport evens was merged with the Best Live Event category being awarded under the name Best Sport and Live Event.

Since 2016, the category is presented as a stand-alone category, separate from the Best Live Event category.

== Winners and nominees ==
=== 1960s ===
Best Outside Broadcasts

Year	Title	Recipient(s)
1964	Antony Craxton	
1965	Dennis Monger	
1966	The State Funeral of Sir Winston Churchill; LSO - The Music Men	Peter Morley
1966	Men Against the Matterhorn; Cup Winners Cup final: "West Ham v Munich"; England v Scotland	Alan Chivers, Walther Pluess
1966	The Lying-in-State and The State Funeral of Sir Winston Churchill; NATO Conference; Festival of Remembrance at Cenotaph	Antony Craxton
1966	Victory in Europe - 20 Years After; Half Time Britain; Science Special; Challenge; Tomorrow's World	Glyn Jones
1967	Grandstand: "World Cup"	
1968	Alan Chivers, Christopher Brasher	

=== 1970s ===
Best Outside Broadcasts

Year	Title	Recipient(s)
1977	1976 FA Cup final	
1977	Match of the Day	
1977	St Nicholas Cantata	Margery Baker
1977	The State Opening of Parliament	
1977	Wimbledon 1976	

=== 1990s ===
Best Sports/Events Coverage in Real Time

Year	Title	Recipient(s)
1995	The Grand National	Keith MacKenzie, Martin Hopkins
1995	Arnhem 50th Anniversary: Out of Ammunition	Michael Begg
1995	D-Day Remembered: Beaches of Normandy and the Bayeux Service of Remembrance	Neil Eccles, Stephen Morris
1995	UEFA Cup: "Aston Villa v Inter Milan"	Mike Inman, John Watts
1996	VE Day Coverage	Peter Hylton Cleaver, Neil Eccles, Philip S. Gilbert and Team
1996	Cheltenham Gold Cup	Jane Garrod
1996	Super Sunday: "The Final Day of the Premiership"	Andy Melvin, Tony Mills
1996	VJ-50 Live: The Final Tribute	Neil Eccles, Simon Betts, Philip S Gilbert
1997	BBC1 Euro '96 Coverage	Niall Sloane, Vivien Kent
1997	Formula 1 Grand Prix Racing	Jim Reside, Keith MacKenzie
1997	Monday Night Football	Andy Melvin, Tony Mills
1997	Remembrance Sunday: The Cenotaph	Peter Cleaver

Best Live Outside Broadcast Coverage

Year	Title	Recipient(s)
1998	Sky Rugby Union	Martin Turner
1998	The Grand National	Malcolm Kemp, Martin Hopkins, Dave Gordon
1998	Hong Kong Handover: The Final Moment	Philip Gilbert, Neil Eccles, Geoff Wilson and the BBC Events Production Team
1998	ITV Coverage of the Grand Prix	Neil Duncanson, Keith McKenzie
1999	Channel 4 Racing: "Derby Day"	Andrew Franklin, Denise Large
1999	The Eurovision Song Contest	Guy Freeman, Geoff Posner
1999	The Football World Cup Final Programme	Paul McNamara, Niall Sloane
1999	World Cup '98: "England v Argentina"	Jeff Farmer, Rick Waumsley, John Watts

=== 2000s ===
Best Sport

Year	Title	Recipient(s)	Broadcaster
2000	Test Cricket	Jeff Foulser, Gary Franses	Channel 4
2000	Formula One 1999	Neil Duncanson, Gerard Lane, Keith MacKenzie	ITV
2000	The Open Golf Championship 1999		BBC One/BBC Two
2000	Interactive Live Football	Piers Croton	Sky Sports
2001	Sydney Olympics 2000	Dave Gordon, Martin Hopkins	BBC One/BBC Two
2001	2000 British Grand Prix	Neil Duncanson, Gerard Lane, Keith MacKenzie	ITV
2001	Test Cricket		Channel 4
2001	Today at the Paralympics	Gary Imlach, James Venner	BBC Two
2002	Channel 4 Cricket		Channel 4
2002	Germany v England	Paul Armstrong, Phil Bigwood, Alan Griffiths	BBC One
2002	British Grand Prix: Silverstone 2001: "Farewell Murray Walker"		ITV
2002	FA Cup Final 2001: Liverpool v Arsenal	Rick Waumsley, John Watts, Jeff Farmer	ITV
2003	The Commonwealth Games		BBC One
2003	ITV World Cup 2002		ITV
2003	World Cup: "England V Argentina"		BBC One
2003	World Rally Championship	Neil Duncanson, Dave Lewis	Channel 4
2004	2003 Rugby World Cup final	John Watts, Simon Moore, Rick Waumsley	ITV
2004	Channel 4 Racing: Cheltenham Gold Cup Day	Denise Large, John Fairley, Andrew Franklin	Channel 4
2004	Test Cricket		Channel 4
2004	London Marathon		BBC One
2005	Olympics 2004: "Matthew Pinsent's Rowing for Gold"		BBC One
2005	Euro 2004: "France V England"	Rick Waumsley, Tony Pastor, Paul McNamara	ITV
2005	Formula One - Monaco	Neil Duncanson, Gerard Lane	ITV
2005	Olympics 2004: "Final Night Athletics"		BBC One
2006	The Ashes: England v Australia		Channel 4
2006	Champions League Final Live: AC Milan v Liverpool	Ric Waumsley, Paul McNamara, David Moss	ITV
2006	Formula One - US Grand Prix	Neil Duncanson, Gerard Lane	ITV
2006	The Open Golf Championship: "Final Round of Jack Nicklaus"		BBC Two
2007	F1: Hungarian Grand Prix: "Jenson Button's First Win"	Neil Duncanson, Gerard Lane	ITV
2007	Cricket On Five	Jeff Foulser, Gary Franses, Dylan Jane, Diana Keen	Five
2007	The Boat Race	John Watts, Tony Pastor, John McKenna, Phil Heslop	ITV
2007	Winter Olympics	BBC Sport Production Team	BBC Two
2008	ITV F1: Canadian Grand Prix Live	Neil Duncanson, Gerard Lane, Kevin Chapman, Steve Aldous	ITV
2008	Wimbledon: The Men's Final	Paul Davies, Carl Hicks, Jonathan Bramley, Bethan Evans	BBC One
2008	Boat Race	John Watts, Tony Pastor, Paul McNamara, John McKenna	ITV
2008	Rugby World Cup 2007: England v France Semi-Final	David Moss, Simon Moore, Paul McNamara	ITV
2009	ITV1 F1: Brazilian Grand Prix 2008	Neil Duncanson, Gerard Lane, Steve Aldous, Steve Rider	ITV
2009	Cheltenham Gold Cup: "Denman v Kauto Star"	Andrew Franklin, John Fairley, Denise Large, Sophie Veats	Channel 4
2009	Olympics 2008		BBC One
2009	Wimbledon 2008: The Men's Final		BBC One

=== 2010s ===
Best Sport

Year	Title	Recipient(s)	Broadcaster
2010	World Athletics Championships		BBC Two/BBC Sport
2010	FA Cup Final	Simon Moore, Paul McNamara, John Watts	ITV/ITV Sports
2010	UEFA Champions League Live	Tony Pastor, John Watts, Paul McNamara	ITV/ITV Sports
2010	F1 - The Brazilian Grand Prix		BBC Two/BBC Sport
2011	Formula 1: The Abu Dhabi Grand Prix		BBC Two/BBC Sport
2011	FA Cup Final: Chelsea v Portsmouth	Tony Pastor, Paul McNamara, Jamie Oakford, Rob Hollier	ITV/ITV Sports
2011	Six Nations: "Wales v England"		BBC Two/BBC Sport
2011	Wimbledon 2010		BBC Two/BBC Sport

Best Sport and Live Event

Year	Title	Recipient(s)	Broadcaster
2012	The Royal Wedding		BBC One
2012	Frankenstein's Wedding: Live in Leeds	Meredith Chambers, Pat Connor, Richard Fell, Eleanor Moran	BBC Three
2012	Rugby World Cup Final	Phil Heslop, Paul McNamara, Tony Pastor, Roger Pearce	ITV
2012	Tour de France 2011	Steve Docherty, Gary Imlach, James Venner, Carolyn Viccari	ITV4
2013	The London 2012 Paralympic Games		Channel 4
2013	The London 2012 Olympics: "Super Saturday"		BBC One
2013	The London 2012 Olympic Opening Ceremony: Isle of Wonder		BBC One
2013	Wimbledon 2012: "Men's Final"		BBC One
2014	The Ashes 2013: "1st Test, Day 5"		Sky Sports
2014	Wimbledon Men's Final		BBC One/BBC Sport
2014	Glastonbury 2013		BBC
2014	Bollywood Carmen Live		BBC Three
2015	WW1 Remembered – From the Battlefield & Westminster Abbey		BBC Two
2015	2014 FA Cup Semi Final: Hull City v Sheffield United		BT Sport 1
2015	Monty Python (Mostly) Live: One Down, Five to Go		Gold
2015	Tour de France, 2014, Stage 1	Steve Docherty, Carolyn Viccari, James Venner, Gary Imlach	ITV

Best Sport

Year	Title	Recipient(s)	Broadcaster
2016	The Ashes	Bryan Henderson, Mark Lynch, David Lloyd, Ian Ward	Sky Sports
2016	The Grand National	Carl Hicks, Denise Large, Sophie Veats, Nick Lightfoot	Channel 4
2016	MOTD Live: "FA Cup Final"	Andrew Clement, Richard Hughes, Ian Finch, Chris Grubb	BBC One
2016	Six Nations: Final Day		BBC One
2017	The Open		Sky Sports 1
2017	Rio 2016 Olympics		BBC One
2017	Rio 2016 Paralympics		Channel 4
2017	Six Nations: "England v Wales"	Paul McNamara, Phil Heslop, David Francis, Mark Demuth	ITV
2018	The Grand National	Paul McNamara, Richard Willoughby, Amy Lewin, Tony Cahalane	ITV
2018	Anthony Joshua v. Wladimir Klitschko	Adam Smith, Ed Robinson, Sara Chenery, Jennie Blackmore	Sky Sports Box Office
2018	Six Nations: "Wales v. England"		BBC One
2018	Uefa Women's Euro Semi-Final: England v. Netherlands	Sunil Patel, Mark Cole, Kay Satterley, Ian Finch	Channel 4
2019	2018 World Cup Quarter Final: England v Sweden		BBC One
2019	2018 Six Nations: "Scotland v England"		BBC One
2019	England's Test Cricket - Cook's Farewell		Sky Sports
2019	Winter Olympics		BBC Two

=== 2020s ===
Year	Title	Recipient(s)	Broadcaster
2020	2019 Rugby World Cup Final: England v South Africa	Phil Heslop, David Francis, Mark Demuth, Paul McNamara	ITV
2020	ICC Cricket World Cup Final		Sky Sports Cricket
2020	Fifa Women's World Cup 2019 Semi-Final: England v USA	Frank Callaghan, Stu Hutchison, Pete Burton, Rebekah Kipps	BBC One
2020	Wimbledon 2019		BBC One
2021	England v West Indies Test Cricket		Sky Sports Cricket
2021	2020 Bahrain Grand Prix		Sky Sports F1
2021	England v France: The Final of Autumn Nations Cup		Amazon Prime Video
2021	London Marathon 2020	Alastair McIntyre, Micky Payne, Matthew Griffiths, Adam Duncan	BBC One
2022	The Abu Dhabi Grand Prix		Sky Sports Formula 1
2022	ITV Racing: The Grand National	Mark Demuth, Paul McNamara, Paul Cooper, Tasleem Hasham-Laywood, Rob Oldham, Jon Harris	ITV Sport/ITV
2022	UEFA EURO 2020 Semi-Final: England v Denmark	Mark Demuth, Paul McNamara, Phil Heslop, Maggie Price, Roger Pearce, Stuart Smith	ITV Sport/ITV
2022	Tokyo 2020 Olympics		BBC Sport/BBC One
2023	UEFA Women's Euro 2022		BBC One
2023	Birmingham 2022 Commonwealth Games		BBC One
2023	Wimbledon 2022		BBC One

Best Sport Event Coverage

Year	Title	Recipient(s)	Broadcaster
2024	Cheltenham Festival: "Day One"	Richard Willoughby, Paul McNamara, Mark Demuth, Bridget Toomey, Rob Oldham, Dionne Robinson-Smith, Andrew Hill	ITV1
2024	MOTV Live: FIFA Women's World Cup 2023		BBC One
2024	Wimbledon 2023: "Men's final"		BBC One
2025	Paris 2024 Olympics		BBC One
2025	Euro 2024		BBC One
2025	Wimbledon 2024		BBC One
2026	UEFA Women's Euro 2025		BBC One
2026	The 2025 Ryder Cup		Sky Sports
2026	The FA Cup Final	Richard Hughes, Sarah Williams, Nicola Kirk, Stephen Lyle, Andrew Clement, Emma White	BBC One
2026	Wimbledon 2025		BBC One

- Note: The series that don't have recipients on the tables had Production team credited as recipients for the award or nomination.
