= 2001 British Academy Television Awards =

UK television awards ceremony

- Date: 13 May 2001
- Site: Grosvenor House Hotel
- Hosted by: Angus Deayton

Highlights
- Best Comedy Series: Da Ali G Show
- Best Drama: Clocking Off
- Best Actor: Michael Gambon; Longitude
- Best Actress: Judi Dench; Last of the Blonde Bombshells
- Best Comedy Performance: Sacha Baron Cohen Da Ali G Show

Television coverage
- Channel: BBC One
- Ratings: 6.82 million

The 2001 British Academy Television Awards were held on Sunday 13 May 2001. The ceremony took place at the Grosvenor House Hotel in Park Lane, London and was broadcast live on BBC One.

== Winners and nominees ==
Best Drama Series	Best Single Drama
Clocking Off (Red Production Company/BBC One); The Cops (World Productions/BBC Two); Fat Friends (Rollem Productions/Tiger Aspect Productions/Yorkshire Television/ITV); The Sins (BBC/BBC One)	Care (BBC/BBC ONE); Donovan Quick (Making Waves Film & TV Limited/BBC Scotland/BBC Two); Nice Girl (BBC/BBC Two); Storm Damage (BBC/BBC Two)
British Academy Television Award for Best Comedy Programme or Series	Best Soap Opera
''Da Ali G Show'' (TalkBack Productions/Channel 4); Baddiel and Skinner Unplanned (Avalon Television/ITV); Smack The Pony (TalkBack Productions/Channel 4); Victoria Wood With All The Trimmings (Good Fun/Ovation Entertainment Limited/BBC One)	Emmerdale (BBC One) (Yorkshire Television/ITV); Coronation Street (Granada Television/ITV); EastEnders (BBC/BBC One); Hollyoaks (Mersey Television/Channel 4)
Best Actor	Best Actress
Michael Gambon – Longitude (Channel 4); Steven Mackintosh – Care (BBC One); Pete Postlethwaite – The Sins (BBC One); Steve McFadden – EastEnders (BBC)	Judi Dench – The Last of the Blonde Bombshells (BBC One); Geraldine James – The Sins (BBC One); Amanda Redman – At Home with the Braithwaites (ITV); Fay Ripley – Cold Feet (ITV); Alison Steadman – Fat Friends (ITV)
Best Comedy Performance	Best Drama Serial
Sacha Baron Cohen – Da Ali G Show (Channel 4); Caroline Aherne – The Royle Family (BBC One); Kathy Burke – Gimme Gimme Gimme (BBC Two); Dawn French – The Vicar of Dibley (BBC One)	Longitude (Granada Television/A&E Network/Channel 4); Nature Boy – (BBC/BBC Two); Never Never – (Company Pictures/Channel 4); This Is Personal: The Hunt for the Yorkshire Ripper – (Granada Television/ITV)
Best Entertainment Performance	Best Entertainment Programme
Graham Norton – So Graham Norton (Channel 4); Rory Bremner – Blair Did It All Go Wrong? (Channel 4); Angus Deayton – Have I Got News For You (BBC One/BBC Two); Paul Merton – Have I Got News For You (BBC One/BBC Two)	So Graham Norton (Channel 4); Have I Got News For You (Hat Trick Productions/BBC One/BBC Two); The Weakest Link (BBC/BBC Two); Who Wants to Be a Millionaire? (Celador/ITV)
Best Factual Series	Best Specialist Factual
Britain at War in Colour (TWI/Carlton Television/ITV); Castaway 2000 (Lion TV/BBC Scotland/BBC One); Fifteen (Windfall Films/Channel 4); Horizon (BBC/BBC Two)	Howard Goodall's Big Bangs (Tiger Aspect Productions/Channel 4); Arena: Wisconsin Death Trip (BBC/BBC Two); Elizabeth (United Productions/Channel 4); A History of Britain by Simon Schama (BBC/BBC Two)
Best Single Documentary	Best News and Current Affairs Journalism
100% White (Diverse Productions/Channel 4); The Boy David - The Return (Man Alive Group/BBC One); Endurance: Shackleton and the Antarctic (White Mountain Films/NOVA/American Museum of Natural History/Channel 4); The Man Who Bought Mustique (Café Productions/Channel 4)	Out of Africa (Insight News Productions/CNN/Channel 4); Mozambique Floods (BBC/BBC One/BBC Two); Mozambique Floods (the event and the aftermath) (ITN/ITV); Panorama: Who Bombed Omagh? (BBC/BBC One)
Best Sport	Best Situation Comedy
Sydney Olympics 2000 (BBC/BBC One/BBC Two); British Grand Prix 2000 (Mach1/ITV); Test Cricket (Sunset + Vine/Channel 4); Today at the Paralympics (VTV Limited/BBC Two)	Black Books (Assembly Film & Television/Channel 4); Blackadder: Back & Forth (Tiger Aspect Productions/Sky One); One Foot in the Grave (BBC/BBC One); The Royle Family (Granada Television/BBC One)
Best Features	Innovation Award
The Naked Chef (Optomen/BBC Two); Faking It (RDF Media/Channel 4); House of Horrors (Granada Television/ITV); What the Romans Did for Us (BBC/BBC Two)	Big Brother (Bazal/Channel 4); Castaway 2000 (Lion TV/BBC Scotland/BBC One); Doctors (BBC/BBC One); Nice Girl (BBC/BBC Two)
Lew Grade Audience Award (as voted for by Radio Times readers)	BAFTA Fellowship
Inspector Morse: The Remorseful Day (ITV); Hero of the Hour (ITV); Seeing Red (ITV); A Touch of Frost (ITV); The Vicar of Dibley (BBC One)	John Thaw
Dennis Potter Award	Alan Clarke Award
Lynda La Plante	Ruth Caleb
Special Award	Special Award
Coronation Street	Patrick Moore
