= One Love Manchester =

2017 benefit concert organised by Ariana Grande

- Promotional poster for the concert
- Created by: Ariana Grande; Simon Moran; Melvin Benn; Scooter Braun
- Directed by: Hamish Hamilton
- Presented by: Main hosts Sara Cox; Ore Oduba; Backstage hosts Nick Grimshaw; Anita Rani; BBC Radio hosts Scott Mills; Jo Whiley; Phil Williams; Becky Want; Global Radio; Margherita Taylor; Kat Shoob; Marvin Humes; Roman Kemp
- Starring: Ariana Grande; Marcus Mumford; Take That; Robbie Williams; Pharrell Williams; Miley Cyrus; Niall Horan; Stevie Wonder; Little Mix; Victoria Monét; The Black Eyed Peas; Imogen Heap; Parrs Wood High School Choir; Mac Miller; Katy Perry; Justin Bieber; Coldplay; Liam Gallagher
- Opening theme: "One Last Time"
- Country of origin: United Kingdom
- Original language: English

Production
- Executive producer: Guy Freeman
- Producers: Scooter Braun; Melvin Benn
- Production locations: Old Trafford Cricket Ground, Old Trafford, Greater Manchester
- Camera setup: Multi camera
- Running time: 18:55 until 22:10
- Production company: BBC Studios

Original release
- Network: BBC One; BBC Radio; Global Radio
- Release: 4 June 2017

One Love Manchester was a benefit concert and British television special on 4 June 2017, organised by American singer-songwriter Ariana Grande in response to the bombing after Grande's concert at Manchester Arena two weeks earlier. It took place at Old Trafford Cricket Ground, and was attended by 55,000 people. Guest performers included Justin Bieber, the Black Eyed Peas, Coldplay, Miley Cyrus, Mac Miller, Marcus Mumford, Niall Horan, Little Mix, Katy Perry, Take That, Imogen Heap, Victoria Monét, Pharrell Williams, Robbie Williams, U2, and Liam Gallagher.

Proceeds from the event went to the We Love Manchester Emergency Fund established by Manchester City Council and the British Red Cross to help the victims and their families. The British Red Cross received more than £10 million in donations in the 12 hours following the concert. Networks from at least 50 countries broadcast the concert live, which was simultaneously streamed live on various platforms, including Twitter, Facebook, and YouTube. New York's Vulture.com ranked the event as the No. 1 concert of 2017.

== Background ==
On 22 May 2017, a suicide bomb attack was carried out at Manchester Arena in Manchester, England, following a performance by American singer Ariana Grande as part of her Dangerous Woman Tour. 22 of the concert-goers and parents who were at the entrance waiting to pick up their children following the show were killed, and 1,017 were injured.

Within a few hours of the bombing, Grande herself posted on Twitter: "broken. from the bottom of my heart, i am so so sorry. i don't have words." The tweet briefly became the most-liked tweet in history. Grande subsequently suspended her tour and flew to her mother's home in Boca Raton, Florida. On 26 May, she announced that she would host a benefit concert in Manchester for the victims of the attack.

== Development and planning ==
Event tickets were made available on 1 June 2017 for £40, and sold with no booking fees. These tickets sold out within 6 minutes of going on sale. Fans who were at the concert of 22 May could apply to attend at no cost. The application ended on 31 May at 17:00, but was extended till 22:00 to allow as many people at the concert on the 22nd to apply to be there as possible. Metrolink offered free travel for concertgoers to and from the Old Trafford tram stop. Uber also said that fares for passengers travelling to and from the concert will be donated to charity.

Following the London Bridge attack that occurred the day before the show, Greater Manchester Police announced that security would be tighter than planned. They also advised attendees not to bring bags into the venue for security reasons.

Tickets for the concert were found to be listed for sale on the online auction site eBay, at prices above the original sale price. However, eBay responded by removing these listings from their site.

== Main event ==
A minute's silence was held before Marcus Mumford opened the concert, at the request of Mumford, in memory of those killed both in Manchester and in London.

After Grande's first performance of the night, Stevie Wonder appeared via video link. After Heap's performance, a video of prominent Manchester footballer David Beckham reading a poem dedicated to the city was played. Videos of other artists and celebrities, including Halsey, Bastille, Anne-Marie, Demi Lovato, Jennifer Hudson, Blossoms, Chance the Rapper, Camila Cabello, The Chainsmokers, DJ Khaled, Little Mix, Circa Waves, Kendall Jenner, Clean Bandit, Dua Lipa, Sean Paul, Nick Grimshaw, Kings of Leon, Sam Smith, Rita Ora, Shawn Mendes, Twenty One Pilots, Paul McCartney, U2 and the players of Manchester United and Manchester City declaring their solidarity with Manchester were also shown.

Liam Gallagher, lead singer of Manchester-based rock band Oasis, made a surprise appearance near the end of the concert. He had previously stated his desire to perform but indicated a conflict with the Rock im Park festival in Germany. He flew in straight from his performance in Germany. Coincidentally, he was also scheduled to perform at the Rock am Ring festival two days prior, but the rest of that festival day was cancelled before his scheduled performance due to terror suspicions.

Usher was due to appear but did not perform due to parental duties. He appeared alongside other musicians in the pre-recorded video sending well wishes to Manchester.

=== Set list ===
1. Marcus Mumford – "Timshel"
2. Take That – "Shine"
3. Take That – "Giants"
4. Take That – "Rule the World"
5. Robbie Williams – "Strong" (Manchester We're Strong)
6. Robbie Williams – "Angels"
7. Pharrell Williams – "Get Lucky" (accompanied by Marcus Mumford and Bae dancers Mette Towley and Ai Shimatsu)
8. Pharrell Williams and Miley Cyrus – "Happy" (accompanied by Bae dancers Mette Towley and Ai Shimatsu)
9. Miley Cyrus – "Inspired"
10. Niall Horan – "Slow Hands"
11. Niall Horan – "This Town"
12. Ariana Grande – "Be Alright"
13. Ariana Grande – "Break Free"
14. Stevie Wonder – "Love's in Need of Love Today" (video)
15. Little Mix – "Wings"
16. Ariana Grande and Victoria Monét – "Better Days"
17. The Black Eyed Peas and Ariana Grande – "Where Is the Love?"
18. Imogen Heap – "Hide and Seek"
19. Ariana Grande and Parrs Wood High School Choir – "My Everything"
20. Ariana Grande and Mac Miller – "The Way"
21. Mac Miller and Ariana Grande – "Dang!"
22. Ariana Grande and Miley Cyrus – "Don't Dream It's Over"
23. Ariana Grande – "Side to Side"
24. Katy Perry – "Part of Me"
25. Katy Perry – "Roar"
26. Justin Bieber – "Love Yourself"
27. Justin Bieber – "Cold Water"
28. Ariana Grande – "Love Me Harder"
29. Coldplay and Ariana Grande – "Don't Look Back in Anger"
30. Coldplay – "Fix You"
31. Coldplay – "Viva la Vida"
32. Coldplay – "Something Just Like This"
33. Liam Gallagher – "Rock 'n' Roll Star"
34. Liam Gallagher – "Wall of Glass"
35. Liam Gallagher and Coldplay – "Live Forever"
36. Ariana Grande and all other artists – "One Last Time"
37. Ariana Grande – "Somewhere Over the Rainbow"

== Broadcasts ==
The concert was broadcast live on BBC One, BBC Radio and Capital FM networks. Television coverage on BBC One was presented by Sara Cox and Ore Oduba, with Nick Grimshaw and Anita Rani hosting from backstage and within the crowd. BBC Radio coverage consisted of a simultaneous broadcast, hosted by Scott Mills, Jo Whiley, Phil Williams and Becky Want, on BBC Radio 1, BBC Radio 2, BBC Radio 5 Live and BBC Radio Manchester respectively. BBC World Service also transmitted the concert live. Outside broadcasting facilities were provided by Arena Television, and BBC Radio Outside Broadcasts.

The BBC announced that it would broadcast the entire concert even if it overran its intended three-hour duration, which it did by approximately 20 minutes.

=== UK radio ===
At least 65 British radio stations broadcast the event live, including 39 Global music stations: the entire Capital FM, Heart FM, Gold, Radio X and Smooth Radio networks.

=== International ===
Broadcasters in at least 38 countries screened the concert live, despite the time zone differences. The BBC was the host broadcaster for international television networks, and the European Broadcasting Union (EBU) distributed the concert to its radio members, which was also streamed online. Radio broadcasters were provided the concert through the BBC World Service's programme distribution network. Stations that broadcast the concert were invited to make donations through the British Red Cross.

- Albania: RTSH 2 and Radio Tirana 2
- Argentina: TN (live), E!
- Australia: BBC UKTV (live) and Nine Network
- Austria: oe24.tv
- Belgium: Eén, La Trois, Pure FM and MNM
- Brazil: Multishow
- Bulgaria: Horizont and BNT 1
- Canada: CTV (live), Much (live), Virgin Radio and Vrak
- Chile: E!
- China: Tencent
- Colombia: E!
- Czech Republic: ČT art
- Denmark: TV 2
- Estonia: ETV and Raadio 2
- Finland: Yle TV2
- France: TMC, Mouv'
- Germany: 1LIVE, RBB Fernsehen, Fritz, NDR 2, and DASDING
- Greece: ERT1
- Greenland: TV 2
- Hong Kong: ViuTVsix
- Iceland: RÚV and Rás 2
- Ireland: RTÉ2 and RTÉ 2fm
- Italy: Rai 1, Rai 4, Rai Radio 2, RTL 102.5, and Super!
- Latvia: Latvijas Radio 5
- Lithuania: LRT Radijas
- Mexico: E!
- Netherlands: NPO 3 and NPO 3FM
- New Zealand: TVNZ 1 and BBC UKTV
- Norway: NRK3
- Peru: E!
- Philippines: ANC
- Poland: RMF FM
- Portugal: RTP1
- Romania: TVR1, TVRi
- Sierra Leone: Capital Radio Sierra Leone
- Slovakia: Dvojka
- Slovenia: Radio Val 202
- Sweden: SVT24 and Sveriges Radio P3
- Switzerland: RTS Deux and Radio SRF 3
- Taiwan: KKBox
- United States: Freeform (live) and ABC (highlights)

=== Online streaming ===
The concert was streamed live online across a number of websites and apps, such as YouTube, Twitter and Facebook.

== Attendance and ratings ==
The 50,000-capacity venue sold out within 20 minutes. Approximately 14,000 people who attended the original Ariana Grande concert were eligible for free tickets for the One Love Manchester concert. However, approximately 10,000 additional applications, from people ineligible for free tickets, caused delays in ticket processing.

The concert averaged 10.9 million viewers on BBC One, peaking at 14.5 million viewers. 22.6 million people watched at least three minutes of the program on BBC One, making it the UK's most-watched television event of 2017. The concert reached an audience share of 49.3 percent in overall viewers, 69 percent of adults 16–24 and 61 percent in the demographic of 25–34 year-olds. Consolidated 7-day figures put the average UK viewership at 11.63 million. BBC iPlayer registered more than one million live-stream requests, making One Love Manchester the biggest non-sports programme in iPlayer's history, surpassing the 2012 Summer Olympics opening ceremony.

== Money raised ==
The British Red Cross received £2.35 million in donations during the three-hour concert for the We Love Manchester Emergency Fund. By the next day, the British Red Cross announced it had received more than £10 million since the attack, and subsequently, reports have set the total at more than £17 million.

Grande also donated all proceeds to the fund from a re-release of her single "One Last Time" and a live audio version of "Somewhere Over the Rainbow" that she performed during the concert.

Ticket sale
Original concert ticket holders	General ticket holders	Total attendance
14,158	50,800	55,000

Money raised
Ticket sale	British Red Cross	EIF Facebook Fundraising	Total amount raised
£2 million	£10 million	£358.5 thousand	£17 million +

== Reactions ==
Francis Wilkinson, in Bloomberg.com, wrote that Grande offered "a face that was brave and kind in the wake of terror while accomplishing several useful goals – raising money for victims, bolstering courage and making the attacks look both puny and pointless. Whatever the terrorists had hoped to produce in Manchester, it certainly wasn't this party." Grande received praise for her "grace and strength" in organising, hosting and performing at the concert. Madeline Roth of MTV News wrote that the performance "bolstered courage among an audience that desperately needed it. ... Returning to the stage was a true act of bravery and resilience". The City of Manchester named Grande as an honorary citizen of the city following the singer's "great many selfless acts and demonstrations of community spirit" and will be the first to be awarded from the city.

Kory Grow in Rolling Stone, wrote "It felt incredibly safe. As I made my own way to the tram, I wrote in my Apple Notes app, 'Helicopter hovering overhead,' which to me signified that the fans were being watched over. Then two policemen stopped me and asked me who I was with and whether I'd written anything about a helicopter into my phone, without explaining the technology of how they'd read my Notes app. After a friendly back-and-forth, they looked through my bag, checked my ID and business card and determined I wasn't a threat. 'You have to understand, tensions are running high,' one of the men said with a smile and a handshake, allowing me through the gate. Manchester was secure tonight." Dee Lockett, in New York's Vulture section, ranked the event as the No. 1 concert of 2017, noting:

Less than two weeks after the attack, and with only a few days to privately process and mourn, Ariana returned to Manchester with an entire benefit concert she coordinated. ... She called in every favor, pulling in famous friends like Miley Cyrus and Justin Bieber to show up for the grieving city. After meeting with a parent of one of the victims, Grande said she shifted the tone of the show from somber to celebratory because she understood that it was what her fans needed. ... All night, Ariana performed without breaking, but that was when she had others by her side. ... When it was just her alone with her fans for her finale cover of "Somewhere Over the Rainbow", the floodgates opened. In what will likely go down as one of the defining moments of her career, she paused the song, looked out to her audience, which was already sobbing along with her, then resumed the music to nail yet another impossible note.

In an interview with Billboard magazine, Grande's manager Scooter Braun remarked that "the city of Manchester was the hero."

== Accolades ==
One Love Manchester received two nominations for the BAFTA Television Awards and a nomination for the BAFTA Television Craft Awards.

=== Awards and nominations ===
Awards and nominations for One Love Manchester
Year	Award	Category	Recipient(s)	Result	Ref.
2018	Royal Television Society Craft & Design Awards	Multicamera Work	Richard Valentine, Matt Ingham	Won	
2018	British Academy Television Awards	Best Live Event	One Love Manchester	Nominated	
2018	British Academy Television Awards	Virgin TV's Must-See Moment	"Ariana Grande sings ‘One Last Time’"	Nominated	
2018	British Academy Television Craft Awards	Best Entertainment Craft Team	Richard Valentine, Toby Alington, Simon Sanders	Nominated	
2018	Royal Television Society Awards	Live Event	One Love Manchester	Nominated	

== See also ==
- 2017 in British television
- A Concert for Charlottesville
- List of highest-grossing benefit concerts
