= 2016 British Academy Television Awards =

2016 award ceremony

62nd British Academy Television Awards
- Date: 8 May 2016
- Site: Royal Festival Hall
- Hosted by: Graham Norton

Highlights
- Best Comedy Series: Have I Got News for You
- Best Drama: Wolf Hall
- Best Actor: Mark Rylance; Wolf Hall
- Best Actress: Suranne Jones; Doctor Foster
- Best Comedy Performance: Peter Kay Peter Kay's Car Share; Michaela Coel Chewing Gum
- Most awards: Wolf Hall (2)
- Most nominations: Wolf Hall (4)

Television coverage
- Channel: BBC One
- Duration: 2 hours

The 2016 British Academy Television Awards were held on 8 May 2016.

The nominations were announced on 30 March, with Wolf Hall nominated for four awards.

== Winners and nominees ==
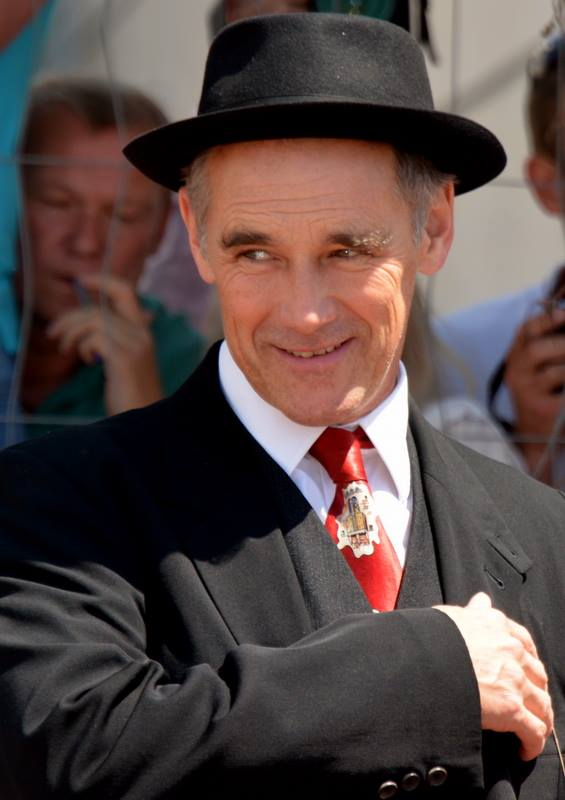
Mark Rylance, Best Actor winner

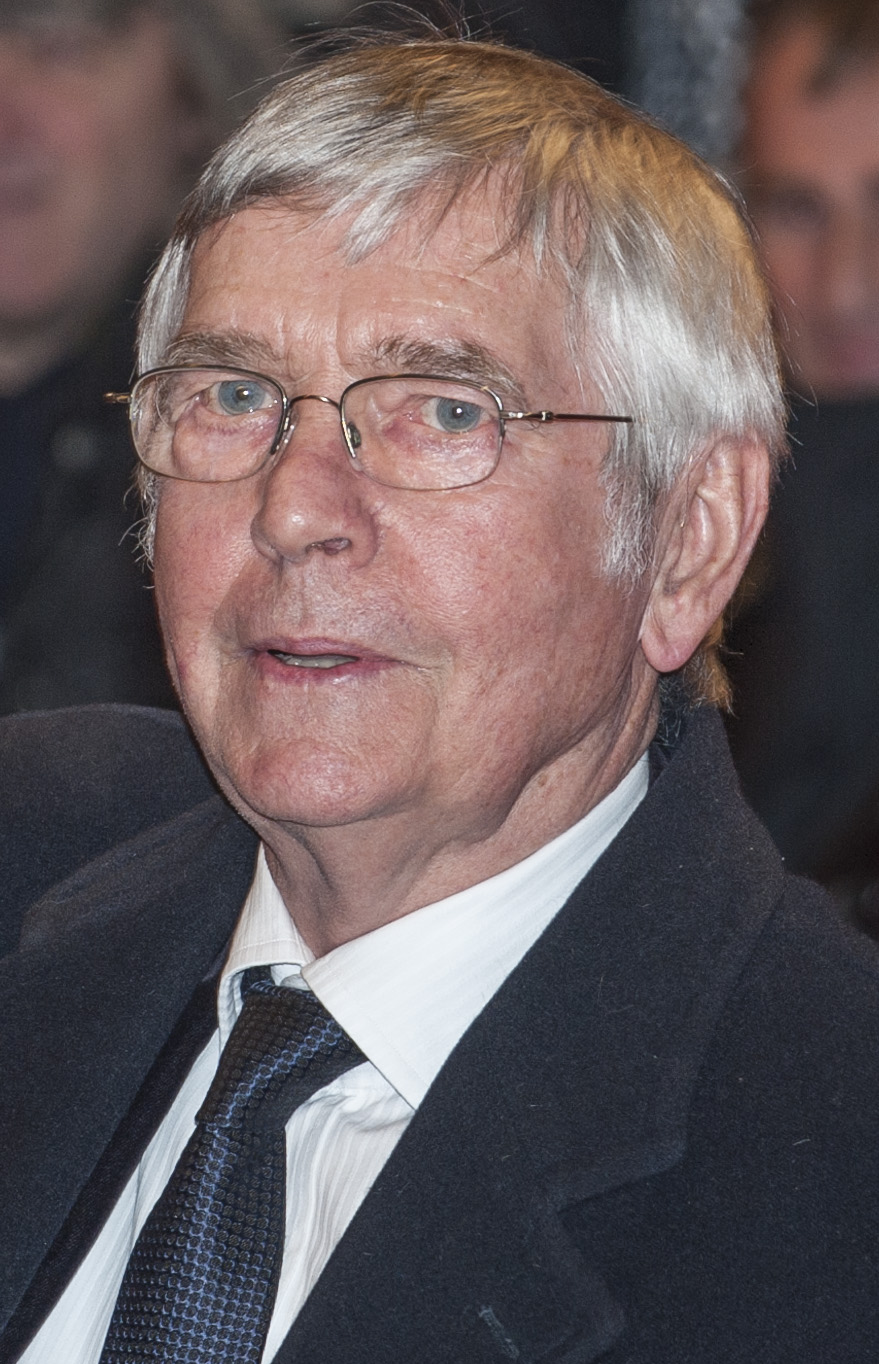
Tom Courtenay, Best Supporting Actor winner

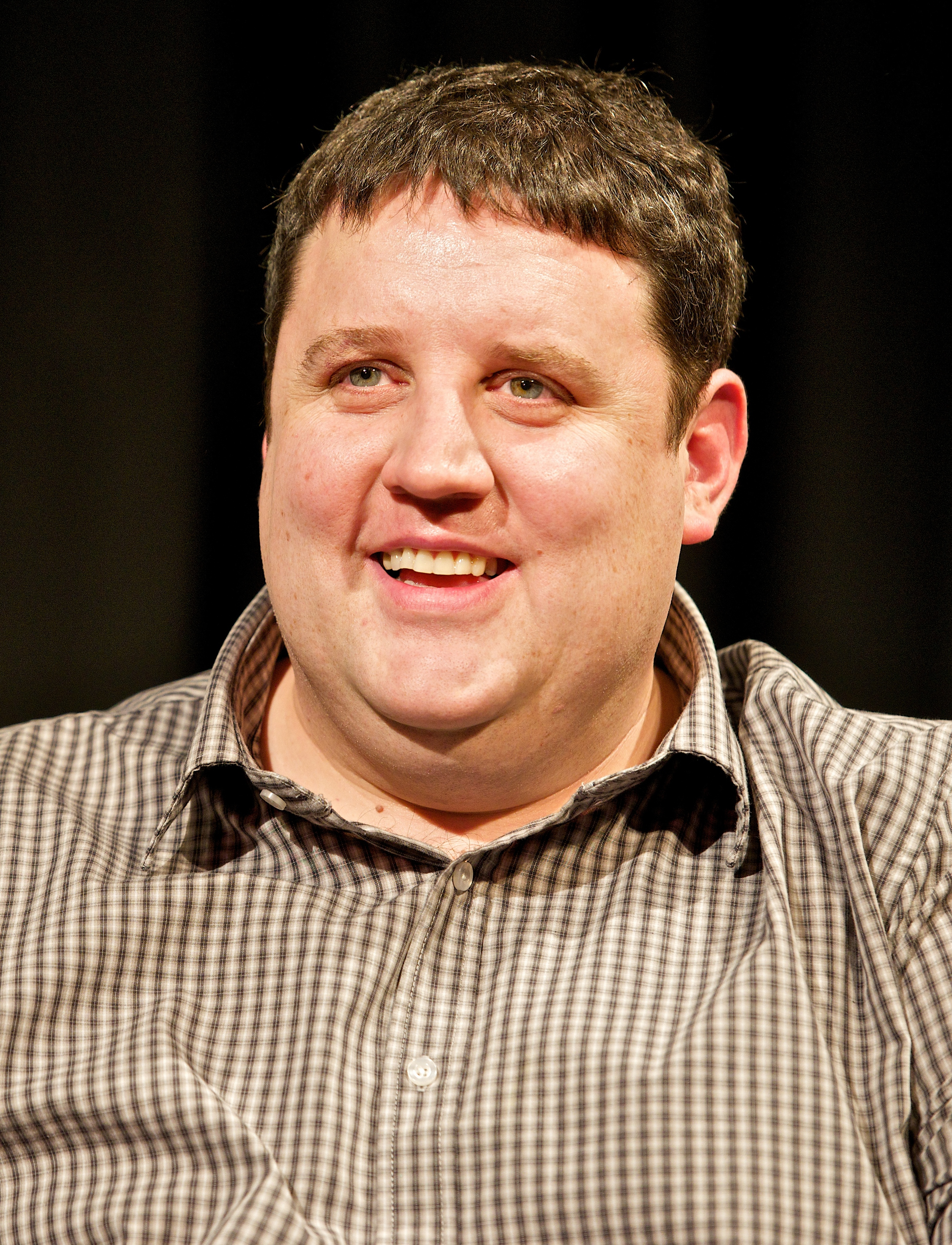
Peter Kay, Best Male Comedy Performance winner

Chewing Gum, Best Female Comedy Performance winner for Michaela Coel and Best Scripted Comedy nominee

Best Actor	Best Actress
Mark Rylance – Wolf Hall as Thomas Cromwell (BBC Two); Ben Whishaw – London Spy as Daniel "Danny" Edward Holt (BBC Two); Idris Elba – Luther as DCI John Luther (BBC One); Stephen Graham – This Is England '90 as Andrew "Combo" Gascoigne (Channel 4)	Suranne Jones – Doctor Foster as Gemma Foster (BBC One); Claire Foy – Wolf Hall as Anne Boleyn (BBC Two); Ruth Madeley – Don’t Take My Baby as Anna Watson (BBC Three); Sheridan Smith – The C-Word as Lisa Lynch (BBC One)
Best Supporting Actor	Best Supporting Actress
Tom Courtenay – Unforgotten as Eric Slater (ITV); Anton Lesser – Wolf Hall as Thomas More (BBC Two); Cyril Nri – Cucumber as Lance Sullivan (Channel 4); Ian McKellen – The Dresser as Norman (BBC Two)	Chanel Cresswell – This Is England '90 as Kelly Jenkins (Channel 4); Eleanor Worthington Cox – The Enfield Haunting as Janet Hodgson (Sky Living); Lesley Manville – River as DCI Chrissie Read (BBC One); Michelle Gomez – Doctor Who as Missy (BBC One)
Best Male Comedy Performance	Best Female Comedy Performance
Peter Kay – Peter Kay's Car Share as John Redmond (BBC iPlayer); Hugh Bonneville – W1A as Ian Fletcher (BBC Two); Javone Prince – The Javone Prince Show as various (BBC Two); Toby Jones – Detectorists as Lance Slater (BBC 4)	Michaela Coel – Chewing Gum as Tracey Gordon (E4); Miranda Hart – Miranda as Miranda (BBC One); Sian Gibson – Peter Kay's Car Share as Kayleigh Kitson (BBC iPlayer); Sharon Horgan – Catastrophe as Sharon Morris (Channel 4)
Best Entertainment Performance	Best Single Drama
Leigh Francis – Celebrity Juice (ITV2); Graham Norton – The Graham Norton Show (BBC One); Romesh Ranganathan – Asian Provocateur (BBC Three); Stephen Fry – QI (BBC Two)	Don't Take My Baby (BBC Three); The C-Word (BBC One); Cyberbully (Channel 4); The Go-Between (BBC One)
Best Mini-Series	Best Drama Series
This Is England '90 (Channel 4); Doctor Foster (BBC One); The Enfield Haunting (Sky Living); London Spy (BBC Two)	Wolf Hall (BBC Two); Humans (Channel 4); The Last Panthers (Sky Atlantic); No Offence (Channel 4)
Best Soap and Continuing Drama	Best International Programme
EastEnders (BBC One); Coronation Street (ITV); Emmerdale (ITV); Holby City (BBC One)	Transparent (Amazon Prime); The Good Wife (More4); Narcos (Netflix); Spiral (BBC Four)
Best Factual Series or Strand	Best Specialist Factual
The Murder Detectives (Channel 4); The Detectives (BBC Two); Great Ormond Street (BBC Two); The Tribe (Channel 4)	Britain's Forgotten Slave Owners (BBC Two); Grayson Perry's Dream House (Channel 4); The Hunt (BBC One); Rudolf Nureyev – Dance to Freedom (BBC Two)
Best Single Documentary	Best Feature
My Son the Jihadi (Channel 4); Bitter Lake (BBC iPlayer); Life After Suicide (BBC One); Louis Theroux: Transgender Kids (BBC Two)	The Great British Bake Off (BBC One); Back in Time for Dinner (BBC Two); Kevin McCloud: Escape to the Wild (Channel 4); Travel Man (Channel 4)
Best Reality and Constructed Factual	Best Current Affairs
First Dates (Channel 4); Gogglebox (Channel 4); I'm a Celebrity...Get Me Out of Here! (ITV); The Secret Life of 5 Year Olds (Channel 4)	Outbreak: The Truth About Ebola (BBC Two); Children of the Gaza War (BBC Two); Escape from Isis – Dispatches (Channel 4); Jihad: A British Story (ITV)
Best News Coverage	Best Sport
Channel 4 News: Paris Massacre (Channel 4); BBC News at Six: Paris Attacks Special (BBC One); ITV News at Ten: Refugee Crisis (ITV); Sky News: From Turkey to Greece (Sky News)	The Ashes (Sky Sports); The Grand National (Channel 4); The FA Cup Final (BBC One); Six Nations – Final Day (BBC One)
Best Live Event	Best Entertainment Programme
Big Blue Live (BBC One); The Sound of Music Live! (ITV); Stargazing Live: Brit In Space, Tim Peake Special (BBC); The Vote (More4)	Strictly Come Dancing (BBC One); Adele at the BBC (BBC One); Britain's Got Talent (ITV); TFI Friday (Channel 4)
Best Scripted Comedy	Best Comedy and Comedy Entertainment Programme
Peter Kay's Car Share (BBC iPlayer); Chewing Gum (E4); Peep Show (Channel 4); People Just Do Nothing (BBC Three)	Have I Got News for You (BBC One); Charlie Brooker's Election Wipe (BBC Two); QI (BBC Two); Would I Lie to You? (BBC One)
Radio Times Audience Award
Poldark (BBC One); Doctor Foster (BBC One); The Great British Bake Off (BBC One); Humans (Channel 4); Making a Murderer (Netflix); Peter Kay's Car Share (BBC iPlayer)

== Programmes with multiple nominations ==
Programmes that received multiple nominations
Nominations	Programme
4	Peter Kay's Car Share
4	Wolf Hall
3	Doctor Foster
3	This Is England '90
2	Chewing Gum
2	Don't Take My Baby
2	Humans
2	London Spy
2	The C-Word
2	The Enfield Haunting
2	The Great British Bake Off
2	QI

Networks that received multiple nominations
Nominations	Network
26	BBC One
23	Channel 4
20	BBC Two
8	ITV
5	BBC iPlayer
4	BBC Three
2	E4
2	More4
2	Netflix
2	Sky Living

== Most major wins ==
Shows that received multiple awards
Wins	Show
2	Peter Kay's Car Share
2	This is England '90
2	Wolf Hall

Wins by Network
Wins	Network
7	BBC One
6	Channel 4
4	BBC Two
2	BBC iPlayer

== In Memoriam ==
- Victoria Wood
- Terry Wogan
- Val Doonican
- Peter Dimmock
- Tony Warren
- Hugh Scully
- Deborah Shipley
- Stephen Lewis
- Anthony Valentine
- Warren Mitchell
- Frank Kelly
- Sue Lloyd-Roberts
- Patrick Macnee
- Jon Beazley
- Hazel Adair
- George Cole
- Denise Robertson
- Jimmy Hill
- Garry Shandling
- Paul Daniels
- Jack Gold
- Jim Pullin
- Cilla Black
- David Nobbs
- Cliff Michelmore
- Ray Fitzwalter
- Ronnie Corbett

== Notes ==
- Strictly Come Dancing won its first BAFTA this year.
