= The Jury: Murder Trial =

- Country of origin: United Kingdom
- Original language: English

Production
- Producer: Byron Archard Productions
- Production company: ScreenDog

Original release
- Network: Channel 4

The Jury: Murder Trial is a British reality television series. Each series is a verbatim re-enactment from court records of a real murder trial in which actors take the parts of the legal teams and judges while the jurors are people drawn from every-day life.

== Premise ==
The series questions whether or not juries randomly drawn from citizens from all backgrounds without legal qualifications are suitable for making a just decision in cases that can lead to life prison sentences. In Series 1 which aired in February 2024, two juries in isolation of each other followed the re-enactment of a real case in which a man admits to killing his wife with a hammer after two months of marriage because he 'just snapped', hoping for a verdict of the lesser crime of manslaughter. The second series which was broadcast in August 2025 is a reconstruction of a murder trial in which a woman is accused of having stabbed her partner to death during an alleged attempt by him to strangle her during a domestic altercation. The series was again filmed with actors for the court officials but only one jury of randomly selected citizens.

== Reception ==
The first series of The Jury: Murder Trial won 'Best Reality' at the 2025 British Academy Television Awards and 'Best Original Programme' at the Broadcast Awards 2025. Television critic Lucy Mangan gave the first series 4 out of 5 stars. Writing for The Guardian Rachel Aroesti awarded 4 out of 5 stars for the second series, stating "Are random citizens fit to dole out life sentences? Probably not. Does the jury system double as a Petri dish for truly illuminating reality TV? Absolutely."
