= British Academy Television Award for P&O Cruises Memorable Moment =

Annual UK television award

British Academy Television Award
- Country: United Kingdom
- Presented by: British Academy of Film and Television Arts
- First award: 2017
- Currently held by: The Celebrity Traitors: "Alan Carr wins The Celebrity Traitors" (2026)
- Website: http://www.bafta.org/

The British Academy Television Award for Memorable Moment is awarded annually as part of the British Academy Television Awards. The category was created in 2017 and the winner is usually voted by the public. From 2017 to 2022, the category was sponsored by Virgin TV and presented under the name Virgin TV's Must-See Moment. For the 2023 ceremony, the sponsor for the category changed to P&O Cruises, also changing the name into its current name P&O Cruises Memorable Moment Award.

In 2025 Strictly Come Dancing became the first programme to receive multiple wins, with two wins from two nominations. Meanwhile, Game of Thrones and Line of Duty have been the most nominated programmes in the category with three nominations each.

== Winners and nominees ==
=== 2010s ===
==== Must-See Moment ====
Year	Programme	Moment	Broadcaster (UK)
2017	Planet Earth II	"Snake v Iguana Chase"	BBC One
2017	Game of Thrones	"Battle of the Bastards"	Sky Atlantic
2017	Line of Duty	"Urgent Exit Required"	BBC Two
2017	Strictly Come Dancing	"Ed Balls' Gangnam Style"	BBC One
2017	Who Do You Think You Are?	"Danny Dyer's Origins"	BBC One
2017	The Late Late Show with James Corden	"Carpool Karaoke with Michelle Obama"	Sky One
2018	Blue Planet II	"Mother Pilot Whale Grieves"	BBC One
2018	Game of Thrones	"Viserion is killed by the Night King"	Sky Atlantic
2018	Doctor Who	"The 13th Doctor Revealed"	BBC One
2018	Line of Duty	Huntley's Narrow Escape	BBC One
2018	One Love Manchester	"Ariana Grande Sings 'One Last Time'"	BBC One
2018	Love Island	"Stormzy Makes a Surprise Appearance"	ITV2
2019	Bodyguard	"Julia Montague assassinated"	BBC One
2019	Coronation Street	"Gail's monologue on the suicide of Aidan Connor"	ITV
2019	Doctor Who	"Rosa Parks, the Doctor and her companions ensure history remains intact"	BBC One
2019	Killing Eve	"Eve stabs Villanelle"	BBC One
2019	Peter Kay's Car Share	"The finale"	BBC One
2019	Queer Eye	"Tom completes his transformation"	Netflix

=== 2020s ===
Year	Programme	Moment	Broadcaster
2020	Gavin & Stacey	"Nessa Proposes to Smithy"	BBC One
2020	Fleabag	"Priest tells Fleabag to Kneel"	BBC Three
2020	Coronation Street	"The Death of Sinead Osbourne"	ITV1
2020	Line of Duty	"John Corbett's Death"	ITV1
2020	Game of Thrones	"Arya Kills the Night King"	HBO/Sky Atlantic
2020	Love Island	"Michael recouples after Casa Amor"	ITV2
2021	Britain's Got Talent	"Diversity perform a routine inspired by the events of 2020"	ITV
2021	Bridgerton	"Penelope is revealed as Lady Whistledown"	Netflix
2021	EastEnders	"Gray kills Chantelle"	BBC One
2021	Gogglebox	"Reactions to Boris Johnson's press conference"	Channel 4
2021	The Mandalorian	"Luke Skywalker appears"	Disney+
2021	Nigella's Cook, Eat, Repeat	"Mee-cro-wah-vay"	BBC Two
2022	Strictly Come Dancing	"Rose and Giovanni silent dance to 'Symphony' "	BBC One
2022	An Audience with Adele	"Adele is surprised by the teacher who changed her life"	ITV
2022	I’m a Celebrity… Get Me Out of Here	"Ant and Dec dig at Downing Street lockdown parties"	ITV
2022	It's a Sin	"Colin's devastating AIDS diagnosis"	Channel 4
2022	RuPaul's Drag Race UK	"UK Hun?" - Bimini's verse	BBC Three
2022	Squid Game	"Red Light, Green Light game"	Netflix

==== Memorable Moment Award ====
Year	Programme	Moment	Broadcaster
2023	Platinum Jubilee: Party at the Palace	"Paddington Meets The Queen"	BBC One
2023	Derry Girls	"The Finale, the people of Northern Ireland vote overwhelmingly for peace"'	Channel 4
2023	Heartstopper	"Nick and Charlie’s First Kiss"	Netflix
2023	Stranger Things	"Lucas, Dustin and Steve rescue Max from the demonic Vecna by playing her favourite song - Kate Bush's "Running Up That Hill"	Netflix
2023	The Real Mo Farah	"Sir Mo Farah revealing he was illegally trafficked to the UK"	BBC One
2023	The Traitors	"The Final Roundtable"	BBC One
2024	Happy Valley	"Catherine Cawood and Tommy Lee Royce's final kitchen showdown"	BBC One
2024	Beckham	"David teases Victoria about her "working class" upbringing"	Netflix
2024	Doctor Who	"Ncuti Gatwa being revealed as the 15th Doctor"	BBC One
2024	Succession	"Logan Roy's death"	Sky Atlantic
2024	The Last of Us	"Bill and Frank"	Sky Atlantic
2024	The Piano	"13-year old Lucy stuns commuters with jaw-dropping piano performance"	Channel 4
2025	Strictly Come Dancing	"Chris McCausland and Dianne Buswell waltz to 'You'll Never Walk Alone' "	BBC One
2025	Bridgerton	"The carriage scene where Colin admits his true feelings for Penelope"	Netflix
2025	Gavin & Stacey: The Finale	"Smithy's Wedding: Mick Stands Up"	BBC One
2025	The Traitors	"Paul isn't my son... but Ross is!"	BBC One
2025	Mr Bates vs The Post Office	"Jo Hamilton phones the Horizon helpline"	ITV1
2025	Rivals	"Rupert Campbell-Black and Sarah Stratton are caught in a game of naked tennis"	Disney+
2026	The Celebrity Traitors	"Alan Carr wins The Celebrity Traitors"	BBC One
2026	Adolescence	"Jamie snaps at the psychologist"	Netflix
2026	Big Boys	"I didn't make it, did I?"	Channel 4
2026	Blue Lights	"The police are warned of an ambush to plot to silence a key witness"	BBC One
2026	LOL: Last One Laughing UK	"Bob Mortimer and Richard Ayoade's speed date"	Prime Video
2026	What It Feels Like for a Girl	"Byron leaves for Brighton to start university, where she introduces herself as Paris"	BBC Three

== Shows with multiple wins and nominations ==
=== Multiple wins ===
2 wins

- Strictly Come Dancing

=== Multiple nominations ===
3 nominations

- Game of Thrones
- Line of Duty
- The Traitors/The Celebrity Traitors

2 nominations

- Bridgerton
- Coronation Street
- Doctor Who
- Love Island
- Strictly Come Dancing
