= The Tribe (2015 TV series) =

- Genre: Factual television
- Country of origin: United Kingdom
- Original language: English
- No. of seasons: 1
- No. of episodes: 4

Production
- Production locations: South Omo Valley, Ethiopia

Original release
- Network: Channel 4
- Release: 11 June – 2 July 2015

The Tribe is a factual television series broadcast by Channel 4. It is based around a Hamar tribe family in the South Omo Valley in Ethiopia called the Ayke Mukos. The series is about how the family lives and carries out day-to-day activities and also how they carry out more important tasks, such as marriage planning and leaving home. It was filmed in the same way that Channel 4 programme, Educating Yorkshire, was filmed, using small, hidden, remote cameras to film everything that went on in the village.

The first series started broadcasting on 11 June 2015 and finished broadcasting on 2 July 2015.

== Critical reception ==
The Independent called it a "warm, fascinating documentary series" and The Guardian said it "is starting to lead the way in reality-TV-gone-right". The Daily Express called it a "jewel of the current schedules" and said "This beautiful documentary series shows all the familiar faultlines and foibles of our world in the encampment of reed huts in Ethiopia's South Omo Valley." while Mark Smith in The Herald wrote "The Tribe is such good news because it rather spectacularly moves on from the stereotypes by introducing us to a family in Ethiopia who are, uncannily and hilariously, close to us." David Chater of The Times observed "What is miraculous about this (series) is the way it highlights our shared humanity."

== TV ratings ==
Series	Episode	Broadcast date	Number of viewers	Audience share	Reference
1	1	11 June	1.71 million	8.6%	
1	2	18 June	1.34 million	6.8%	
1	3	25 June	1.36 million	7%	
1	4	2 July	1.38 million	6%	
