= 2024 British Academy Television Awards =

Awards recognising the excellence of British television in 2024

70th British Academy Television Awards
- Date: 12 May 2024
- Site: Royal Festival Hall
- Hosted by: Rob Beckett; Romesh Ranganathan

Highlights
- Best Comedy Series: Such Brave Girls
- Best Drama: Top Boy
- Most awards: Happy Valley / The Sixth Commandment / Top Boy (2)
- Most nominations: Happy Valley / Succession (5)

Television coverage
- Channel: BBC One

The 2024 British Academy Television Awards ceremony was held on 12 May 2024 at the Royal Festival Hall in London, to recognise the excellence in British television of 2023. The ceremony was hosted by Rob Beckett and Romesh Ranganathan for the second time in a row, and was broadcast on BBC One.

The nominations were announced on 20 March 2024 alongside the nominations for the 2024 British Academy Television Craft Awards. The nominees for the P&O Cruises Memorable Moment were announced on 14 March 2024. Happy Valley and Succession led the nominations with five each, followed by The Sixth Commandment and The Crown, both with four. Lorraine Kelly was presented with the Special Award. The BAFTA Fellowship, the organization's highest honour, was presented to Floella Benjamin.

== Background ==
=== Category changes and updates ===
The academy announced several category changes and updates for the 2024 edition:

- In order to be eligible for the Daytime category, episodes must be transmitted between 09:00 and 18:00.
- For the Best Entertainment Programme, two people will be considered as a pair if they have equal billing on their entered program and are entered together. Previously, pairs were required to be recognised as a presenting duo to be eligible.
- The categories for Best Mini-Series and Best Single Drama will be merged into a category named Limited Drama, to recognise "scripted one-off programmes or series that tell a complete story over 1-19 episodes".
- The categories for Best Sport and Best Live Event will be merged again into a category named Best Sport & Live Event Coverage (the merged category had previously been presented from 2012 to 2015). The categories will be split in case there are 12 sports and 12 live events entered.
- Three category names have been updated and renamed:
  - Best Soap and Continuing Drama into Best Soap
  - Best Reality and Constructed Factual into Best Reality
  - Best Features into Best Factual Entertainment

=== Fellowship ===
On 24 April, it was announced that Floella Benjamin would receive the BAFTA Fellowship award for her services to television. Of the honour, BAFTA chair Sarah Putt stated "We are honoured to present Baroness Benjamin the BAFTA Fellowship for her tireless support of children and young people, her impact on television broadcasting, and for her unwavering championing of diversity. She is an unstoppable force for good with a determination to create opportunities and positive role models for future generations that has seen her effect a tremendous amount of positive change over fifty years and counting. She is deservedly a national treasure and we can’t wait to celebrate the impact of her work to date on 12th May at the BAFTA Television Awards." In a statement alongside the announcement, Benjamin expressed "My heart is full of joy and happiness. I feel as if I'm standing on the summit of life's mountain, looking down at the wonderful experiences I have had in my career in the television industry of over 50 years. It's been an adventurous journey, with many challenges and adversities, but here I am, receiving the highest accolade BAFTA can bestow. I am delighted that my work, which has predominantly been for children, is being recognised and celebrated in this way."

== Winners and nominees ==
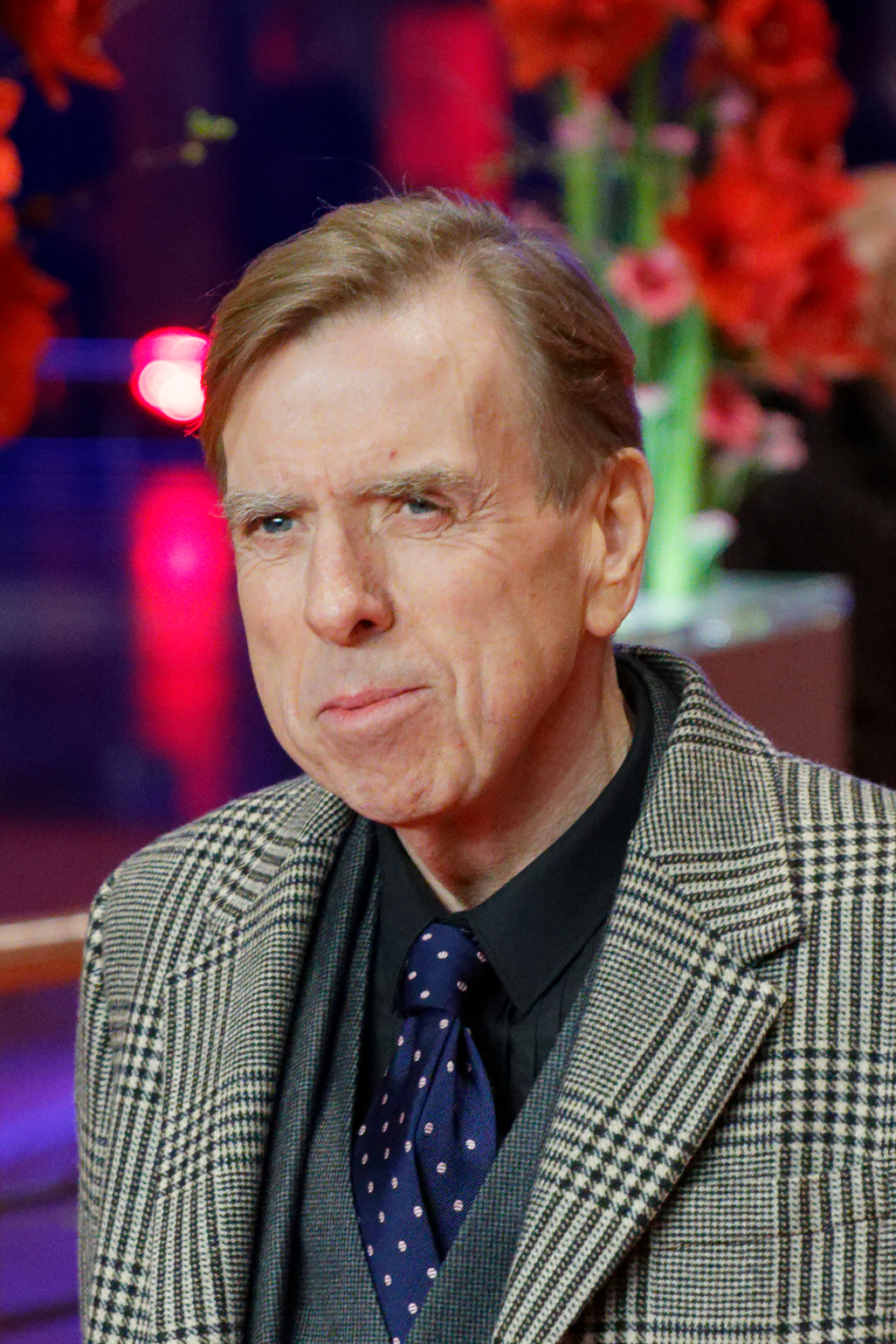
Timothy Spall, Best Actor winner

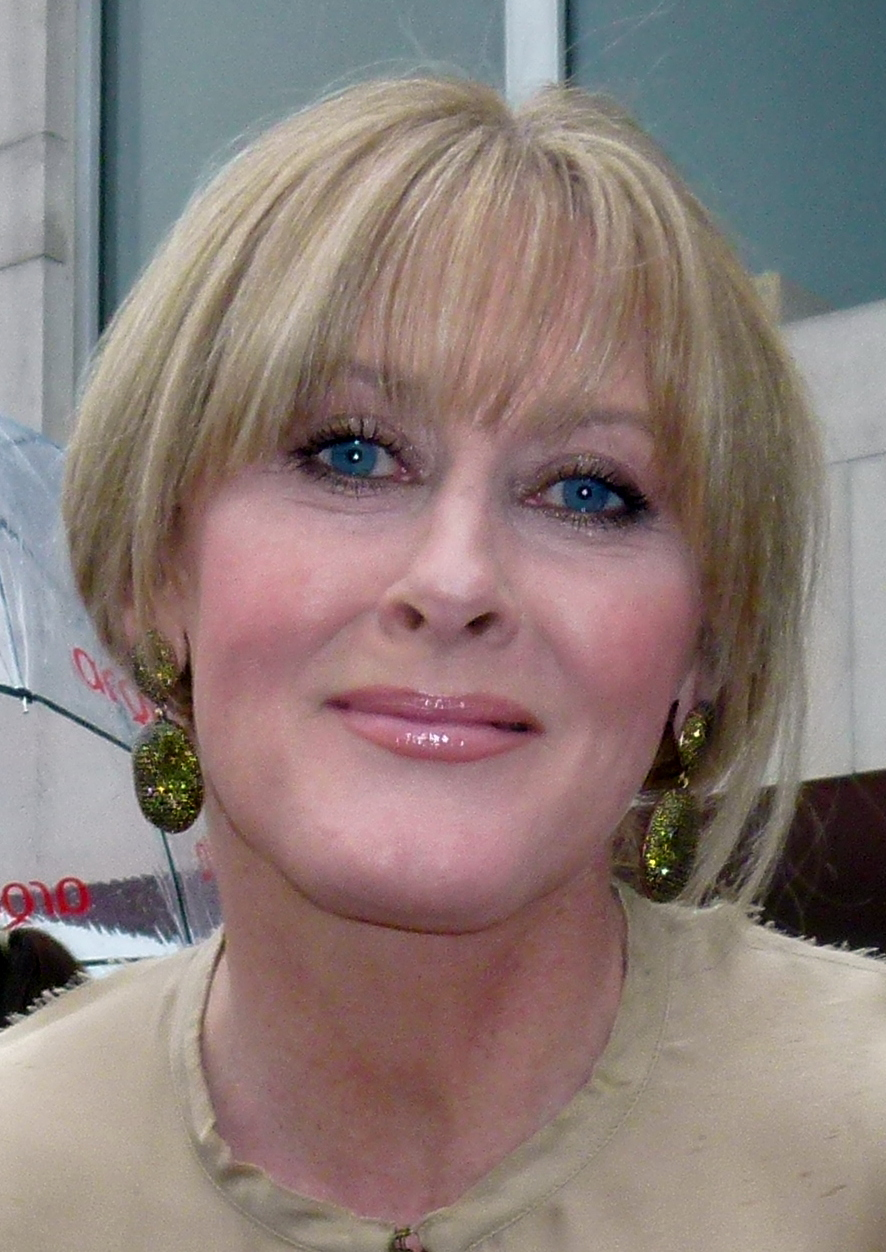
Sarah Lancashire, Best Actress winner

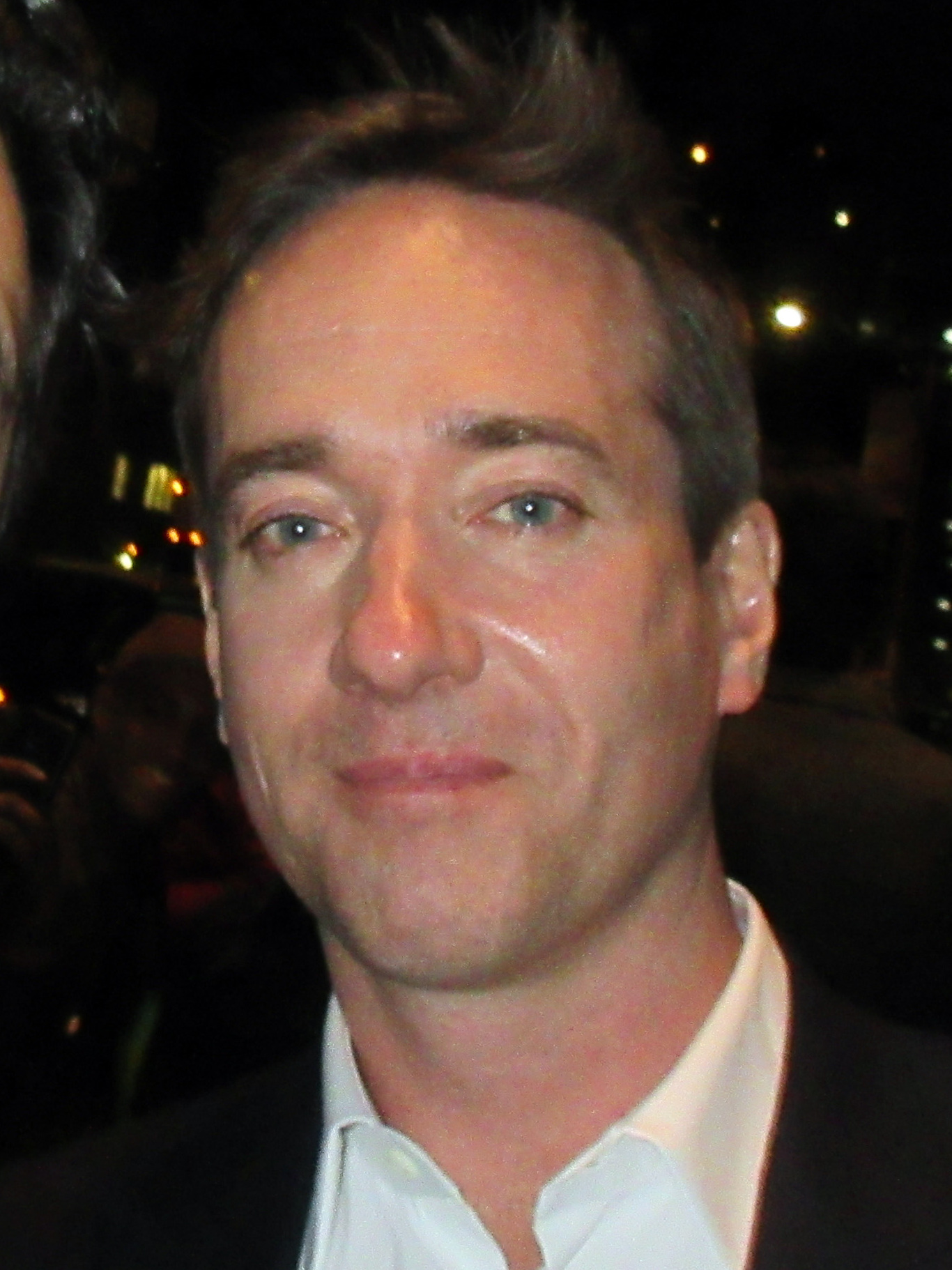
Matthew Macfadyen, Best Supporting Actor winner

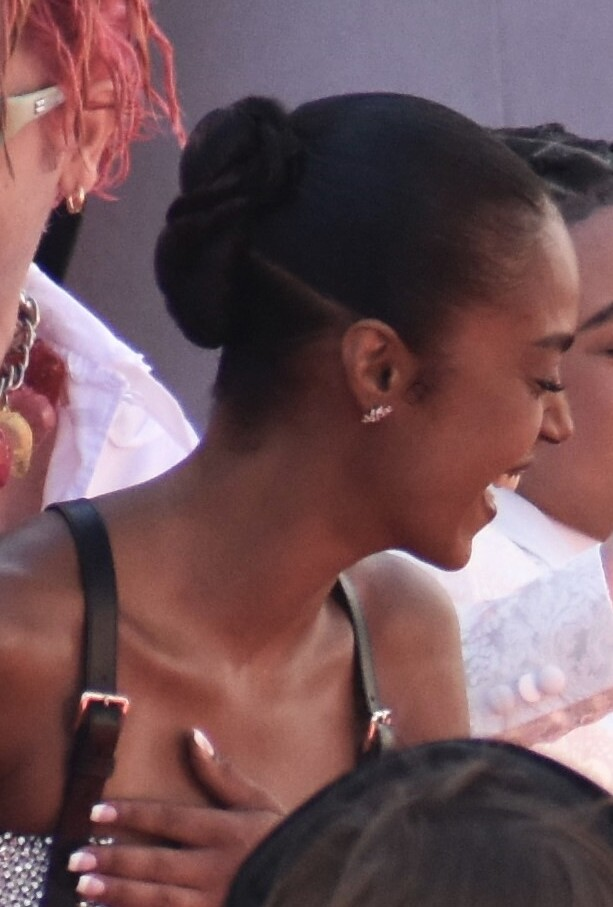
Jasmine Jobson, Best Supporting Actress winner

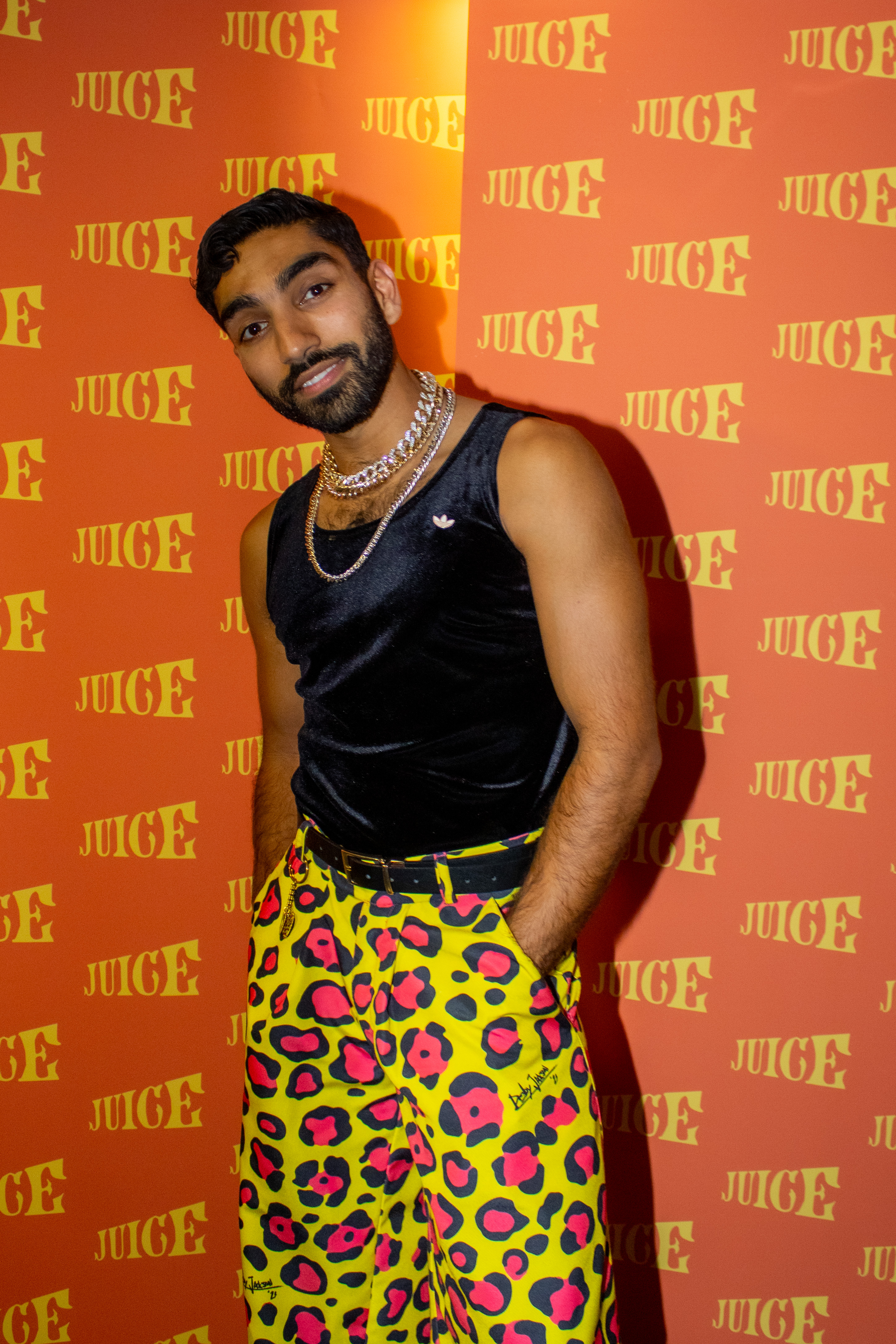
Mawaan Rizwan, Best Male Comedy Performance winner

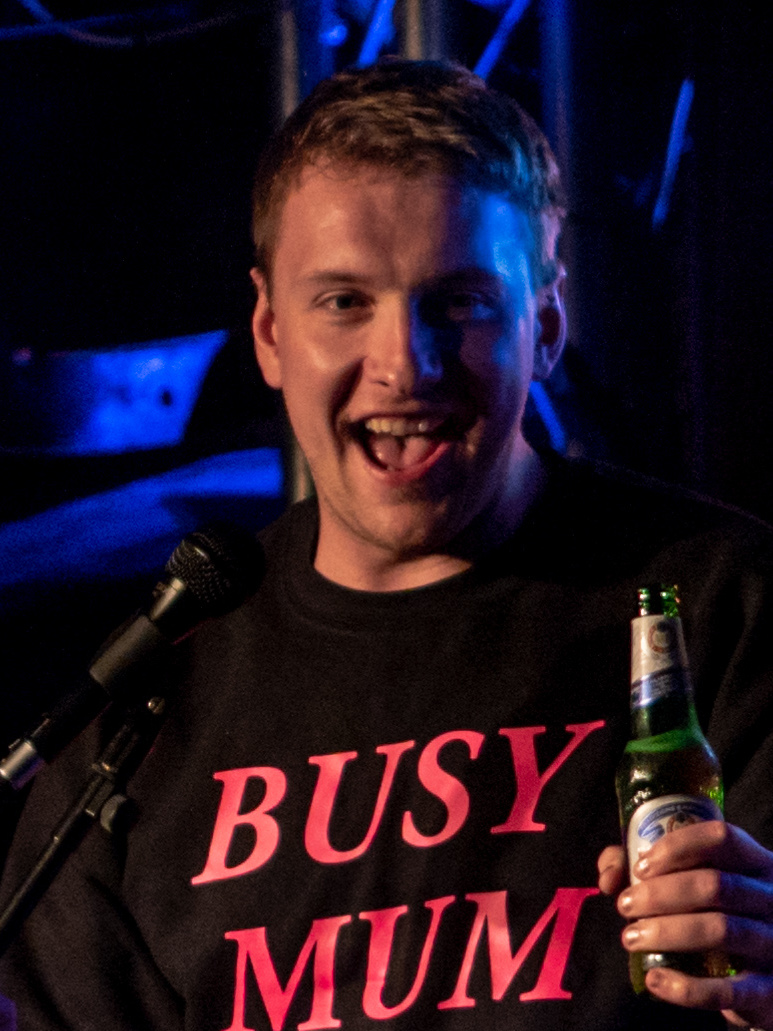
Joe Lycett, Best Entertainment Performance winner

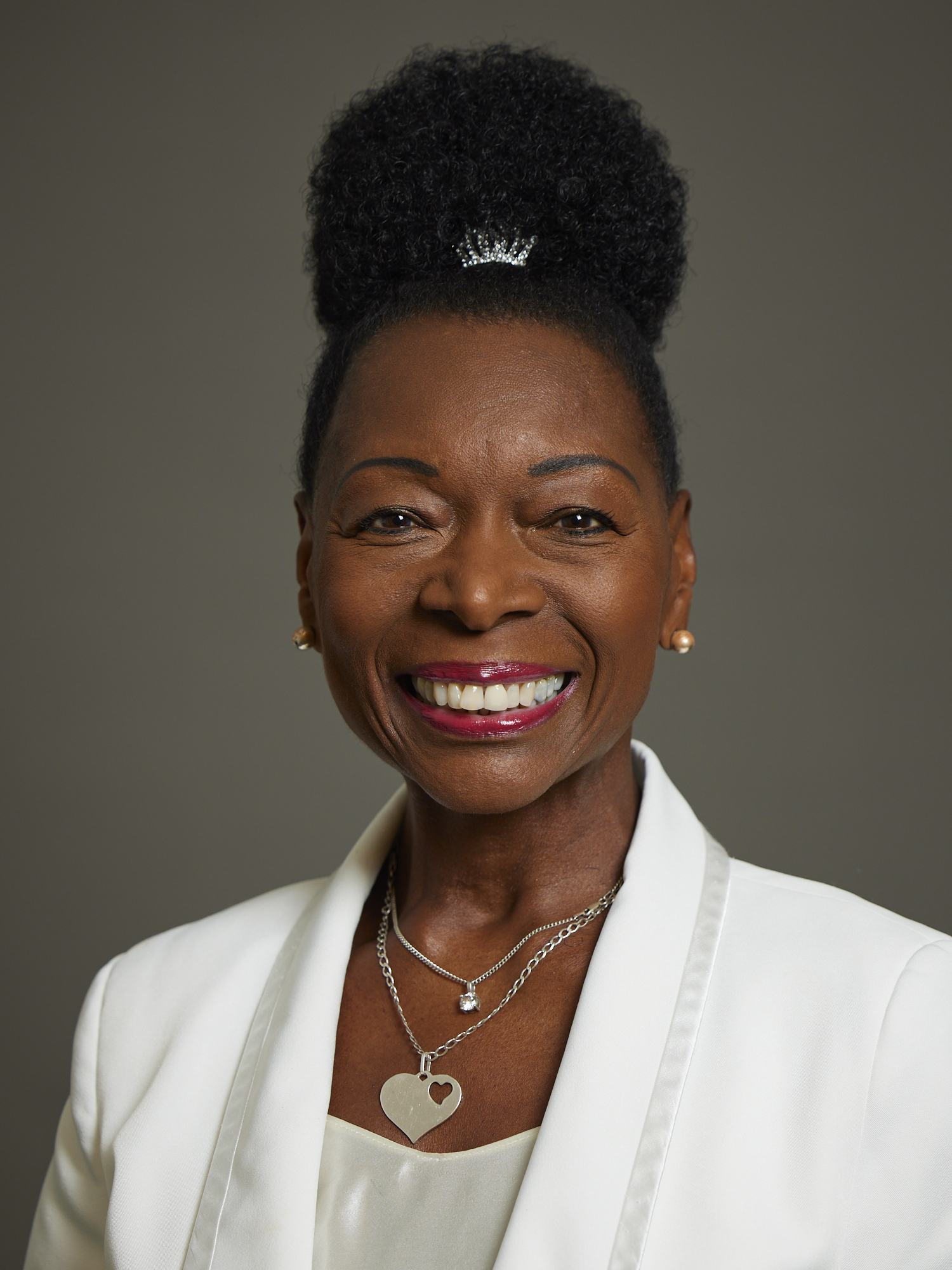
Floella Benjamin, BAFTA Fellowship recipient

The nominations were announced on 20 March 2024.

Best Drama Series	Best Scripted Comedy
Top Boy (Netflix); Happy Valley (BBC One); Slow Horses (Apple TV+); The Gold (BBC One)	Such Brave Girls (BBC Three); Big Boys (Channel 4); Dreaming Whilst Black (BBC Three); Extraordinary (Disney+)
Best Limited Drama	Best Soap
The Sixth Commandment (BBC One); Best Interests (BBC One); Black Mirror: "Demon 79" (Netflix); The Long Shadow (ITV1)	Casualty (BBC One); EastEnders (BBC One); Emmerdale (ITV1)
Best Factual Entertainment	Best Comedy Entertainment Programme
Celebrity Race Across the World (BBC One); Endurance: Race to the Pole (Channel 5); Portrait Artist of the Year (Sky Arts); The Dog House (Channel 4)	Rob and Romesh vs... (Sky Max); Late Night Lycett (Channel 4); The Graham Norton Show (BBC One); Would I Lie to You? (BBC One)
Best Actor	Best Actress
Timothy Spall as Peter Farquhar – The Sixth Commandment (BBC One); Brian Cox as Logan Roy – Succession (HBO / Sky Atlantic); Steve Coogan as Jimmy Savile – The Reckoning (BBC One); Paapa Essiedu as George – The Lazarus Project (Sky Max); Kane Robinson as Gerard "Sully" Sullivan – Top Boy (Netflix); Dominic West as Charles, Prince of Wales – The Crown (Netflix)	Sarah Lancashire as Catherine Cawood – Happy Valley (BBC One); Helena Bonham Carter as Noele Gordon – Nolly (ITVX); Sharon Horgan as Nicci – Best Interests (BBC One); Bella Ramsey as Ellie – The Last of Us (HBO / Sky Atlantic); Anne Reid as Ann Moore-Martin – The Sixth Commandment (BBC One); Anjana Vasan as Nida Huq – Black Mirror: "Demon 79" (Netflix)
Best Supporting Actor	Best Supporting Actress
Matthew Macfadyen as Tom Wambsgans – Succession (Sky Atlantic); Salim Daw as Mohamed Al-Fayed – The Crown (Netflix); Harris Dickinson as William "Bill" Farrah – A Murder at the End of the World (Disney+); Éanna Hardwicke as Ben Field – The Sixth Commandment (BBC One); Jack Lowden as River Cartwright – Slow Horses (Apple TV+); Amit Shah as Faisal Bhatti – Happy Valley (BBC One)	Jasmine Jobson as Jacqueline “Jaq” Lawrence – Top Boy (Netflix); Elizabeth Debicki as Diana, Princess of Wales – The Crown (Netflix); Siobhan Finneran as Clare Cartwright – Happy Valley (BBC One); Lesley Manville as Princess Margaret, Countess of Snowdon – The Crown (Netflix); Nico Parker as Sarah Miller – The Last of Us (HBO / Sky Atlantic); Harriet Walter as Lady Caroline Collingwood – Succession (Sky Atlantic)
Best Male Comedy Performance	Best Female Comedy Performance
Mawaan Rizwan as Jamal "Jamma" Jamshidi – Juice (BBC Three); Hammed Animashaun as Kay – Black Ops (BBC One); Jamie Demetriou as various characters – A Whole Lifetime with Jamie Demetriou (Netflix); Joe Gilgun as Vincent "Vinnie" O'Neill – Brassic (Sky Max); Adjani Salmon as Kwabena – Dreaming Whilst Black (BBC Three); David Tennant as Crowley – Good Omens (Prime Video)	Gbemisola Ikumelo as Dom – Black Ops (BBC One); Taj Atwal as Rana – Hullraisers (Channel 4); Bridget Christie as Linda – The Change (Channel 4); Roisin Gallagher as Janet – The Lovers (Sky Atlantic); Sofia Oxenham as Carrie – Extraordinary (Disney+); Máiréad Tyers as Jen – Extraordinary (Disney+)
Best Entertainment Performance	Best Entertainment Programme
Joe Lycett – Late Night Lycett (Channel 4); Rob Beckett and Romesh Ranganathan – Rob and Romesh vs... (Sky Max); Declan Donnelly and Anthony McPartlin – I'm a Celebrity... Get Me Out of Here! (ITV); Graham Norton – The Graham Norton Show (BBC One); Hannah Waddingham – Eurovision Song Contest 2023 (BBC One); Big Zuu – Big Zuu's Big Eats (Dave)	Strictly Come Dancing (BBC One); Hannah Waddingham: Home for Christmas (Apple TV+); Later... with Jools Holland (BBC Two); Michael McIntyre's Big Show (BBC One)
Best Factual Series	Best Specialist Factual
Lockerbie (Sky Documentaries); Dublin Narcos (Sky Documentaries); Evacuation (Channel 4); Once upon a Time in Northern Ireland (BBC Two)	White Nanny, Black Child (Channel 5); Chimp Empire (Netflix); Forced Out (Sky Documentaries); The Enfield Poltergeist (Apple TV+)
Best Single Documentary	Best Reality
Ellie Simmonds: Finding My Secret Family (ITV1); David Holmes: The Boy Who Lived (Sky Documentaries); Hatton (Sky Documentaries); Vjeran Tomic: The Spider-Man of Paris (Netflix)	Squid Game: The Challenge (Netflix); Banged Up (Channel 4); Married at First Sight UK (E4); My Mum, Your Dad (ITV1)
Best Sport Event Coverage	Best Live Event Coverage
Cheltenham Festival: "Day One" (ITV1); Match of the Day Live: "FIFA Women's World Cup 2023" (BBC One); Wimbledon 2023: "Men's final" (BBC One)	Eurovision Song Contest 2023 (BBC One); The Coronation Concert (BBC One); Royal British Legion Festival of Remembrance (BBC One)
Best Current Affairs	Best News Coverage
This World: The Shamima Begum Story (BBC Two); Dispatches: "Russel Brand: In Plain Sight" (Channel 4); Putin vs the West (BBC Two); Storyville: "Inside Russia: Traitors and Heroes" (BBC Four)	Channel 4 News: "Inside Gaza: Israel and Hamas at War" (Channel 4); Sky News: "Inside Myanmar: The Hidden War" (Sky News); Sky News: "Israel-Hamas War" (Sky News)
Best Short Form Programme	Best Daytime
Mobility (BBC Three); Stealing Ukraine's Children: Inside Russia's Camps (Vice News); The Sekwer: Three Twisted Year (BBC iPlayer); Where It Ends (BBC Three)	Scam Interceptors (BBC One); Loose Women and Men (ITV); Lorraine (ITV); Make It a Market (BBC One)
Best International Programme	Memorable Moment
Class Act (Netflix); Beef (Netflix); Love and Death (ITVX); Succession (HBO / Sky Atlantic); The Bear (Disney+); The Last of Us (HBO / Sky Atlantic)	Happy Valley – Catherine Cawood and Tommy Lee Royce's final kitchen showdown (BBC One); Beckham – David teases Victoria about her "working class" upbringing (Netflix); Doctor Who – Ncuti Gatwa being revealed as the 15th Doctor (BBC One); Succession – Logan Roy's death (Sky Atlantic); The Last of Us – Bill and Frank (Sky Atlantic); The Piano – 13-year old Lucy stuns commuters with jaw-dropping piano performance (Channel 4)

== In Memoriam ==
- Michael Parkinson
- John Savident
- Ray Stevenson
- Annie Nightingale
- Robin Windsor
- Emily Morgan
- Angela Thorne
- Dean Sullivan
- John Nettleton
- Doreen Mantle
- Brian McCardie
- Ewen MacIntosh
- Steve Halliwell
- Meg Johnson
- Michael Jayston
- Ian Lavender
- Chance Perdomo
- Benjamin Zephaniah
- Debbie Young
- Hannah Hawkins
- Eleanor Scoones
- Henry Sandon
- Tony Green
- Dean Jones
- Paul Fox
- John Whitney
- Bernard Hill
- George Alagiah
- Kay Benbow
- Diana Edwards-Jones
- Ruth McCance
- Norman Lear
- Bill Kenwright
- David Attwood
- Haydn Gwynne
- Mike Yarwood
- Jonnie Irwin
- Annabel Giles
- Nick Sheridan
- David Soul
- Dave Myers
- Marcus Plantin
- John Pilger
- Paul Watson
- Jean Boht
- Carl Davis
- Roy Battersby
- Matthew Perry
