= 2018 British Academy Television Awards =

UK television awards ceremony

64th British Academy Television Awards
- Date: 13 May 2018
- Site: Royal Festival Hall
- Hosted by: Sue Perkins

Highlights
- Best Comedy Series: Murder in Successville
- Best Drama: Peaky Blinders
- Best Actor: Sean Bean; Broken
- Best Actress: Molly Windsor; Three Girls
- Best Comedy Performance: Toby Jones Detectorists; Daisy May Cooper This Country
- Most awards: This Country / Three Girls (2)
- Most nominations: Line of Duty (4)

Television coverage
- Channel: BBC One
- Duration: 2 hours

The 2018 British Academy Television Awards took place on 13 May 2018 at the Royal Festival Hall in London.

The nominations were announced on 4 April, with Line of Duty leading with four awards. Black Mirror, The Crown and Three Girls followed with three nominations.

The 2018 British Academy Television Craft Awards were held on 22 April 2018.

== Winners and nominees ==
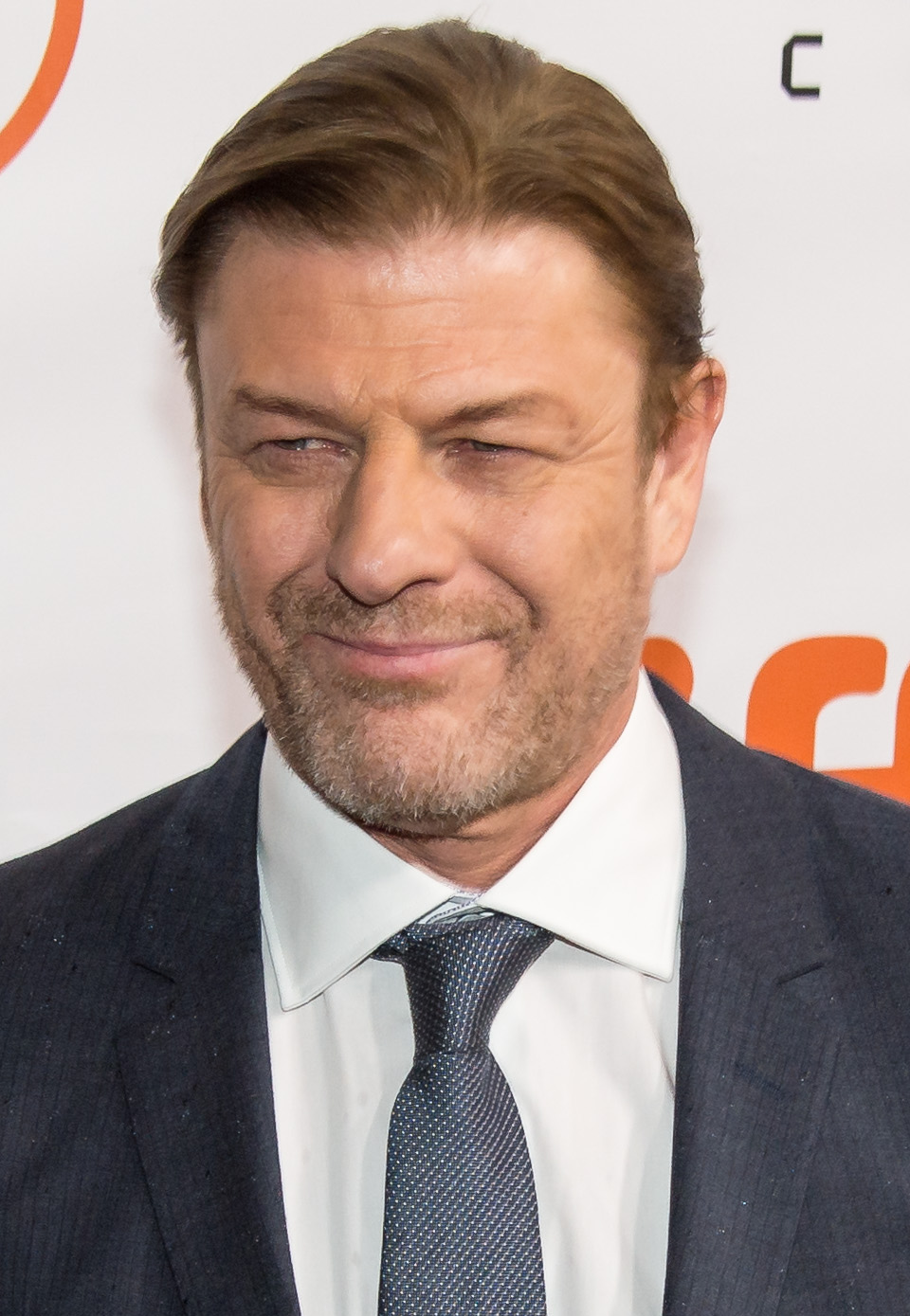
Sean Bean, Best Actor winner

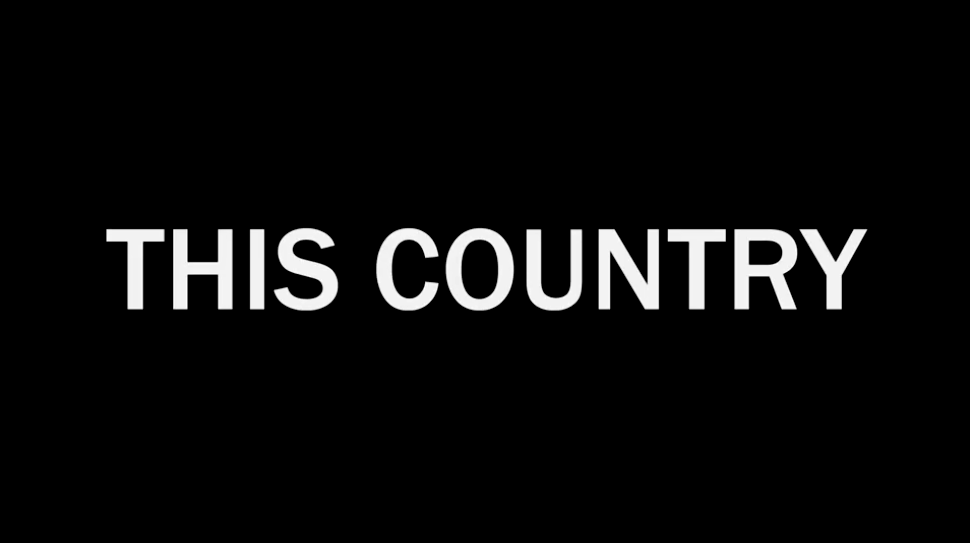
This Country, Best Scripted Comedy winner

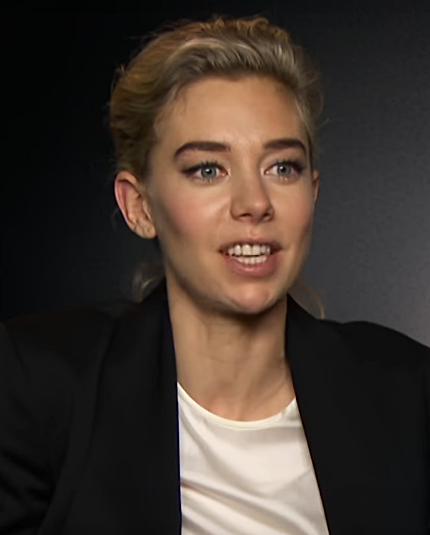
Vanessa Kirby, Best Supporting Actress winner

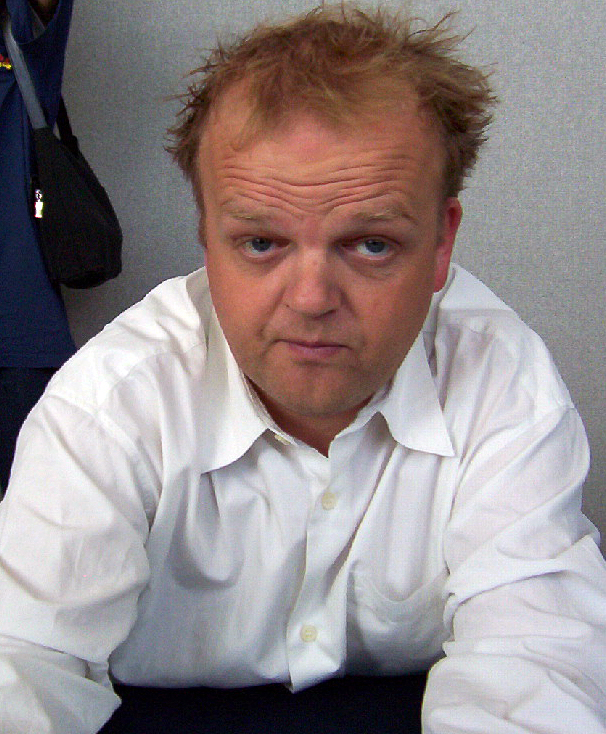
Toby Jones, Best Male Comedy Performance winner

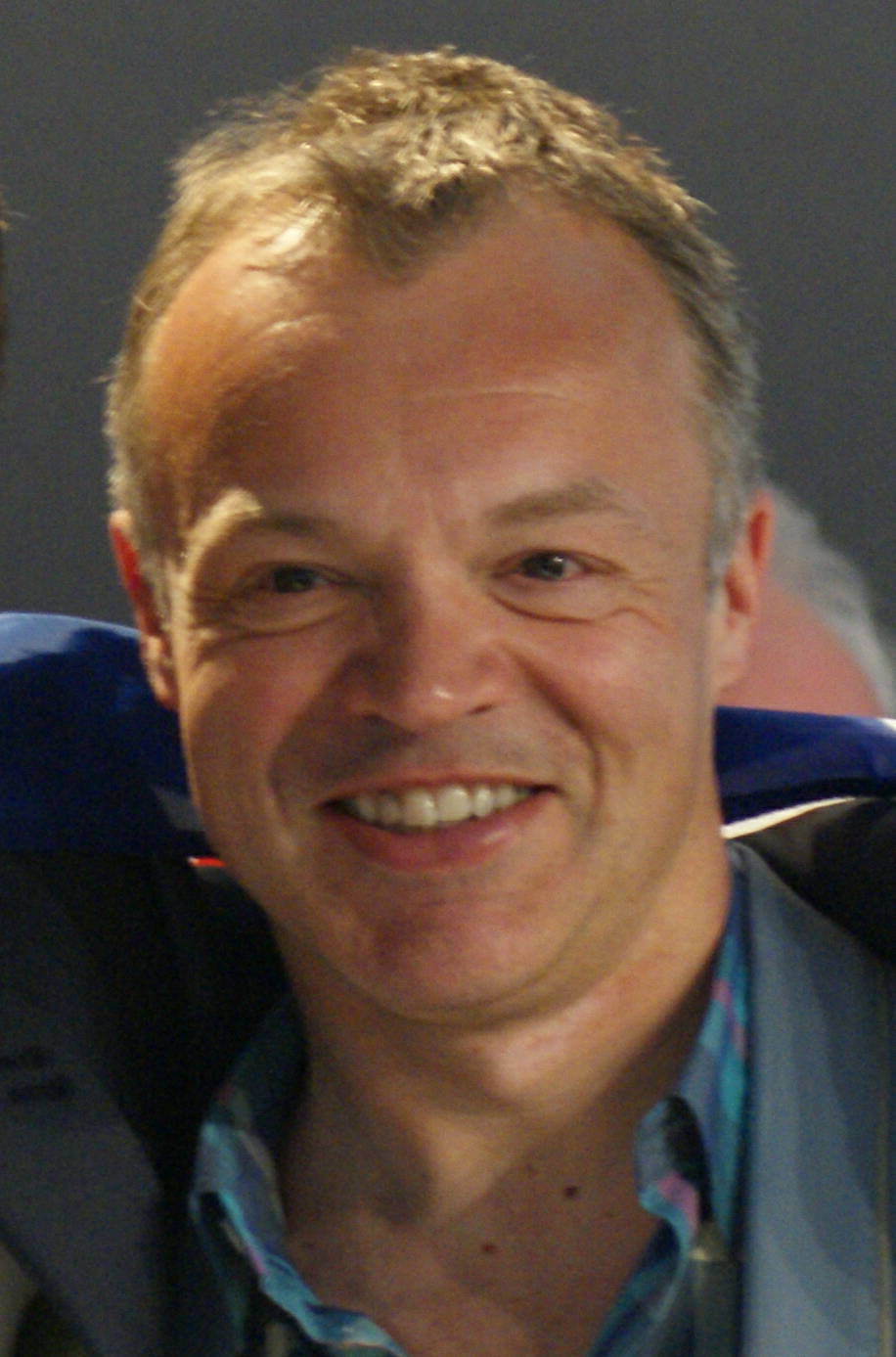
Graham Norton, Best Entertainment Performance winner

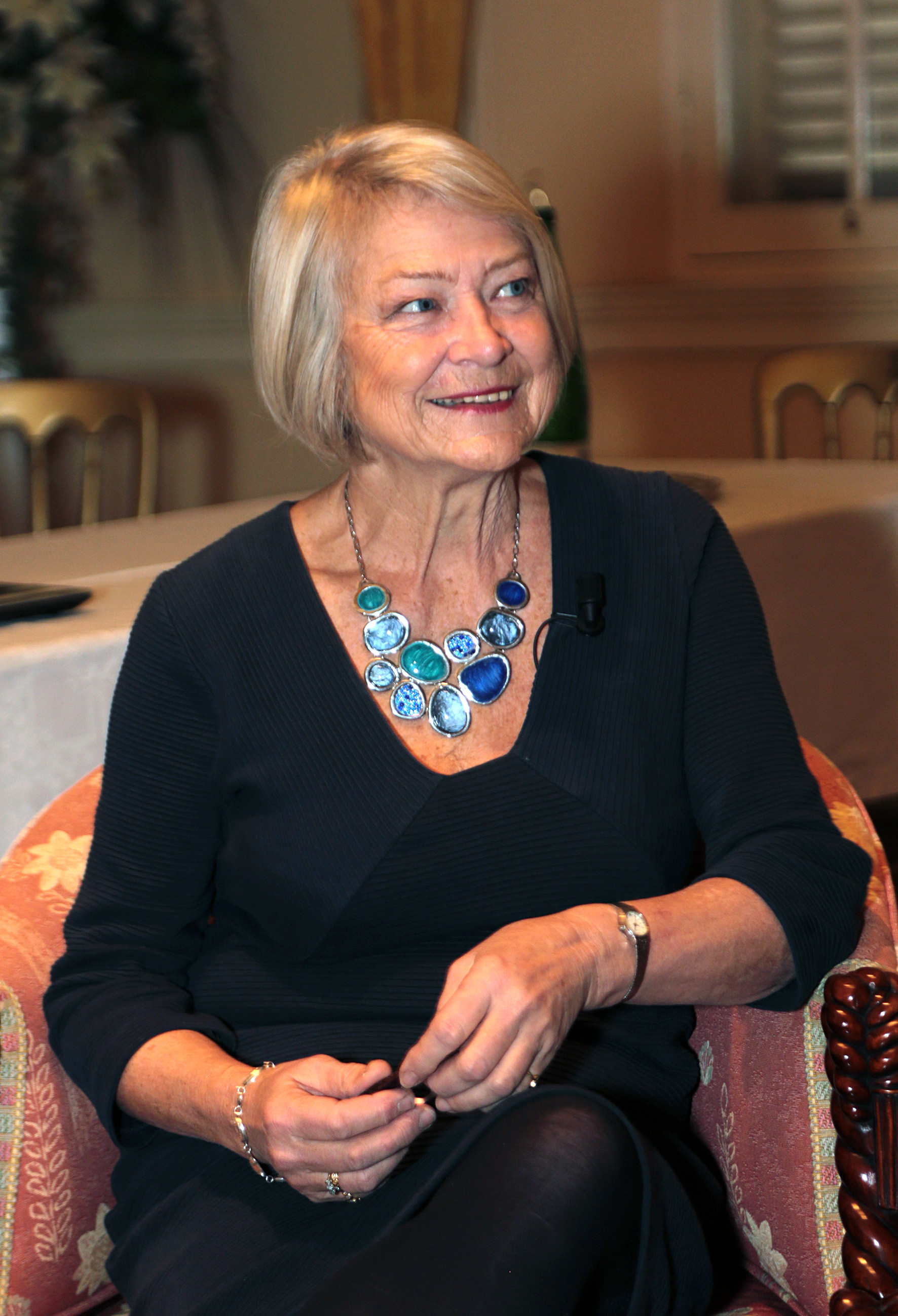
Kate Adie, BAFTA Fellowship Award winner

Best Drama Series	Best Mini-Series
Peaky Blinders (BBC Two); Line of Duty (BBC One); The Crown (Netflix); The End of the F***ing World (All 4)	Three Girls (BBC One); Howards End (BBC One); The Moorside (BBC One); The State (Channel 4)
Best Single Drama	Best Soap and Continuing Drama
Murdered for Being Different (BBC Three); Against the Law (BBC Two); Hang the DJ (Black Mirror) (Netflix); King Charles III (BBC Two)	Casualty (BBC One); Coronation Street (ITV); Emmerdale (ITV); Hollyoaks (Channel 4)
Best Actor	Best Actress
Sean Bean – Broken as Father Michael Kerrigan (BBC One); Joe Cole – Hang the DJ (Black Mirror) as Frank (Netflix); Tim Pigott-Smith – King Charles III as King Charles III (BBC Two); Jack Rowan – Born to Kill as Sam Woodford (Channel 4)	Molly Windsor – Three Girls as Holly Winshaw (BBC One); Claire Foy – The Crown as Queen Elizabeth II (Netflix); Sinead Keenan – Little Boy Blue as Melanie Jones (ITV); Thandie Newton – Line of Duty as Detective Chief Inspector Roseanne "Roz" Huntley (BBC One)
Best Supporting Actor	Best Supporting Actress
Brían F. O'Byrne – Little Boy Blue as Steve Jones (ITV); Adrian Dunbar – Line of Duty as Superintendent Ted Hastings (BBC One); Anupam Kher – The Boy with the Topknot as Sathnam's Father (BBC Two); Jimmi Simpson – USS Callister (Black Mirror) as James Walton (Netflix)	Vanessa Kirby – The Crown as Princess Margaret (Netflix); Anna Friel – Broken as Christina Fitzsimmons (BBC One); Julie Hesmondhalgh – Broadchurch as Trish Winterman (ITV); Liv Hill – Three Girls as Ruby Bowen (BBC One)
Best Male Comedy Performance	Best Female Comedy Performance
Toby Jones – Detectorists as Lance Stater (BBC Four); Rob Brydon – The Trip to Spain as himself (Sky Atlantic); Asim Chaudhry – People Just Do Nothing as Chabuddy G/Charlie (BBC Three); Samson Kayo – Famalam as Various Characters (BBC Two)	Daisy May Cooper – This Country as Kerry Mucklowe (BBC Three); Sian Gibson – Peter Kay's Car Share as Kayleigh Kitson (BBC Two); Sharon Horgan – Catastrophe as Sharon Morris (Channel 4); Anna Maxwell Martin – Motherland as Julia (BBC Two)
Best Scripted Comedy	Best Comedy and Comedy Entertainment Programme
This Country (BBC Three); Catastrophe (Channel 4); Chewing Gum (E4); Timewasters (ITV2)	Murder in Successville (BBC Three); Taskmaster (Dave); The Last Leg (Channel 4); Would I Lie to You? (BBC One)
Best Entertainment Performance	Lew Grade Award for Entertainment Programme
Graham Norton – The Graham Norton Show (BBC One); Adam Hills – The Last Leg (Channel 4); Michael McIntyre – Michael McIntyre's Big Show (BBC One); Sandi Toksvig – QI (BBC Two)	Britain's Got Talent (ITV); Ant & Dec's Saturday Night Takeaway (ITV); Michael McIntyre's Big Show (BBC One); The Voice UK (ITV)
Best Factual Series or Strand	Huw Wheldon Award for Specialist Factual
Ambulance (BBC One); Catching a Killer (BBC Two); Drugsland (BBC Three); Hospital (BBC Two)	Basquiat: Rage to Riches (BBC Two); Blitz: the Bombs That Changed Britain (BBC Two); Blue Planet II (BBC One); Elizabeth I’s Secret Agents (BBC Two)
Robert Flaherty Award for Single Documentary	Best Feature
Rio Ferdinand: Being Mum and Dad (BBC One); Chris Packham: Asperger’s and Me (BBC Two); Louis Theroux, Talking to Anorexia (BBC Two); One Deadly Weekend in America (BBC Three)	Cruising with Jane McDonald (Channel 5); Antiques Roadshow (BBC One); No More Boys And Girls: Can Our Kids Go Gender Free? (BBC Two); The Secret Life of the Zoo (Channel 4)
Best Reality and Constructed Factual	Best Live Event
Love Island (ITV2); Celebrity Hunted (Channel 4); Old People's Home for 4 Year Olds (Channel 4); The Real Full Monty (ITV)	World War One Remembered: Passchendaele (BBC Two); ITV News Election 2017 Live: the Results (ITV); One Love Manchester (BBC One); Wild Alaska Live (BBC One)
Best News Coverage	Best Current Affairs
Sky News: The Rohingya Crisis (Sky News); Sky News: The Battle for Mosul (Sky News); Channel 4 News: The Grenfell Tower Fire (Channel 4); ITV News at Ten: The Grenfell Tower Fire (ITV)	Undercover: Britain's Immigration Secrets – Panorama (BBC One); Raped : My Story (Channel 5); Syria's Disappeared: the Case against Assad – Dispatches (Channel 4); White Right: Meeting the Enemy – Exposure (ITV)
Best Sport	Best Short Form Programme
The Grand National (ITV); Anthony Joshua vs. Wladimir Klitschko (Sky Sports Box Office); Six Nations: Wales v. England (BBC One); UEFA Women's Euro Semi-final – England V Netherlands (Channel 4)	Morgana Robinson's Summer (Sky Arts); Britain's Forgotten Men (BBC Three); Eating with My Ex (BBC Three); Pls Like (BBC Three)
Best International Programme	Virgin TV’s Must-See Moment
The Handmaid's Tale (MGM)/(Channel 4); Big Little Lies (HBO)/(Sky Atlantic); Feud: Bette and Joan (Fox 21 Television Studios)/(BBC Two); The Vietnam War (Florentine Films)/(BBC Four)	Blue Planet II – "Mother Pilot Whale Grieves"; Doctor Who – "The Thirteenth Doctor Revealed"; Game of Thrones – "Viserion is Killed by the Night King"; Line of Duty – "Huntley’s Narrow Escape"; Love Island – "Stormzy Makes a Surprise Appearance"; One Love Manchester – "Ariana Grande Sings ‘One Last Time’"

== Programmes with multiple nominations ==
Programmes that received multiple nominations
Nominations	Programme
4	Line of Duty
3	Black Mirror
3	The Crown
3	Three Girls
2	Blue Planet II
2	Broken
2	Catastrophe
2	King Charles III
2	Little Boy Blue
2	Love Island
2	Michael McIntyre's Big Show
2	One Love Manchester
2	The Last Leg
2	This Country

Networks that received multiple nominations
Nominations	Network
27	BBC One
19	BBC Two
14	Channel 4
13	ITV
10	BBC Three
6	Netflix
3	Sky Atlantic
3	ITV2
2	Sky News
2	Channel 5
2	BBC Four
2	HBO

== Most major wins ==
Shows that received multiple awards
Wins	Show
2	This Country
2	Three Girls

Wins by Network
Wins	Network
9	BBC One
4	BBC Three
3	BBC Two
3	ITV

== In Memoriam ==
- Ken Dodd
- Rosemary Leach
- Peter Hall
- Elizabeth Dawn
- Jim Bowen
- Robert Hardy
- Brian Cant
- Liz MacKean
- Barry Norman
- Mark Milsome
- Anthony Booth
- Keith Chegwin
- Rodney Bewes
- William G. Stewart
- Peter Sallis
- Katie Boyle
- Roy Barraclough
- Sean Hughes
- Patricia Llewellyn
- Dale Winton
- Emma Chambers
- Peter Wyngarde
- Emma Tennant
- John Noakes
- Benjamin Whitrow
- Doreen Keogh
- Bruce Forsyth

== Notes ==
- BAFTA Award for Best Short Form Programme is added in this year.
