= 2022 British Academy Television Craft Awards =

Awards ceremony

23rd British Academy Television Craft Awards
- Date: 24 April 2022
- Site: The Brewery, London
- Hosted by: Mel Giedroyc

Highlights
- Most awards: Landscapers / We Are Lady Parts (3)
- Most nominations: It's a Sin / Landscapers (5)

The 23rd Annual British Academy Television Craft Awards were held on 24 April 2022, presented by the British Academy of Film and Television Arts (BAFTA) to recognize technical achievements in British television of 2021. The nominees were announced on 30 March 2022 alongside the nominations for the 2022 British Academy Television Awards.

Sky Atlantic miniseries Landscapers and Channel 4 comedy series We Are Lady Parts received the most awards with three wins each.

== Winners and nominees ==
The nominees were announced on 30 March 2022.

Best Director: Fiction	Best Director: Factual
Peter Hoar – It's a Sin (Channel 4); Lewis Arnold – Time (BBC One); Marc Munden – Help (Channel 4); Will Sharpe – Landscapers (Sky Atlantic)	James Newton – Grenfell: The Untold Story (Channel 4); Arthur Cary – Surviving 9/11 (BBC Two); James Newton – Baby Surgeons: Delivering Miracles (Channel 4); Jamie Roberts – Four Hours at the Capitol (BBC Two)
Best Director: Multi-Camera	Best Scripted Casting
Paul Dugdale – Glastonbury Festival: Live at Worthy Farm (BBC Two); Matthew Griffiths – Six Nations Rugby: Wales v England (BBC Sport/BBC One); Paul McNamara – ITV Racing: The Grand National (ITV Sport/ITV); Nikki Parsons – Strictly Come Dancing (BBC One)	Aisha Bywaters – We Are Lady Parts (Channel 4); Lauren Evans – Sex Education (Netflix); Beverly Keogh and David Martin – Time (BBC One); Andy Pryor – It's a Sin (Channel 4)
Best Writer: Comedy	Best Writer: Drama
Nida Manzoor – We Are Lady Parts (Channel 4); Nathan Bryon and Paul Doolan – Bloods (Sky One); Stephen Merchant and Emma Jane Unsworth – The Outlaws (BBC One); Sophie Willan – Alma's Not Normal (BBC Two)	Kayleigh Llewellyn – In My Skin (BBC Three); Jesse Armstrong – Succession (HBO/Sky Atlantic); Russell T Davies – It's a Sin (Channel 4); Jack Thorne – Help (Channel 4)
Best Original Music
Arthur Sharpe – Landscapers (Sky Atlantic); Natalie Holt – Loki (Disney+); Jonathan "Elevated" Olorunfemi – The Outsiders (Youtube); Carly Paradis – Line of Duty (BBC One)
Best Entertainment Craft Team	Best Production Design
Nigel Catmur, Andy Deacon, Patrick Doherty, Kevin Duff, Simon Haw and Andrew Stokes – The Royal British Legion Festival of Remembrance (BBC One); Casey Antwis, Dave Davey, Elizabeth Honan and Benn Wyldeck – The Masked Singer (ITV); David Bishop, Patrick Doherty, Catherine Land, David Newton, Richard Sillitto and Tom Young – Strictly Come Dancing (BBC One); Mark Busk-Cowley, Catherine Land, Gurdip Mahal, Andy Milligan, Chris Power and Shereen Shimmin – Ant & Dec's Saturday Night Takeaway (ITV)	Cristina Casali, Fabrice Spelta and Robert Wischhusen-Hayes – Landscapers (Sky Atlantic); Cristina Casali – The Pursuit of Love (BBC One); François-Renaud Labarthe – The Serpent (BBC One); Tom Sayer – Vigil (BBC One)
Best Costume Design	Best Make Up and Hair Design
PC Williams – We Are Lady Parts (Channel 4); Ian Fulcher – A Very British Scandal (BBC One); Sinéad Kidao – The Pursuit of Love (BBC One); Adam Howe – The Serpent ("Episode 1") (BBC One)	Barrie Gower, Sarah Gower and Deb Watson – The Witcher (Netflix); Christine Blundell and Lesa Warrener – The Nevers (HBO/Sky Atlantic); Lin Davie and Laura Flynn – It's a Sin (Channel 4); Catherine Scoble – A Very British Scandal (BBC One)
Best Photography and Lighting: Fiction	Best Photography: Factual
Erik Wilson – Landscapers (Sky Atlantic); James Friend – Your Honor (Sky Atlantic); Oli Russell – Sex Education (Netflix); Mark Wolf – Time (BBC One)	James Incledon – Liverpool Narcos (Sky Documentaries); Doug Anderson and Alex Vail – Tiny World ("Reef") (Apple TV+); Dawson Dunning and John Shier – Earth at Night in Color (Apple TV+); Phil Grabsky and Shoaib Sharifi – My Childhood, My Country: 20 Years in Afghanistan (ITV)
Best Sound: Fiction	Best Sound: Factual
Sound Team – A Very British Scandal (BBC One); Adam Armitage, Howard Bargroff, Harry Barnes, Oliver Brierley, Jamie Caple and Judi Lee-Headman – Intergalactic (Sky One); James Bain, Matthew Collinge, Matt Davies, Robert Farr, Rob Prynne and Alyn Sclosa – The Witcher ("Episode 1") (Netflix); Sound Team – Line of Duty (BBC One)	Claire Ellis, Stephen Griffiths, Dan Johnson, Tae Hak Kin, Nas Parkash and Andy Shelley – 1971: The Year That Music Changed Everything (Apple TV+); Paul Ackerman, Jonny Crew, Kate Hopkins and Graham Wild – Earth at Night in Color (Apple TV+); Doug Dreger, Hugh Dwan, James Evans, Nick Fry, Steve Speed and Andrew Yarme – Formula 1: Drive to Survive (Netflix); Conrad Fletcher, Julian Gough, Andy James and Andy Payne – The Funeral of HRH The Prince Philip, Duke of Edinburgh (BBC One)
Best Special, Visual and Graphic Effects	Best Titles and Graphic Identity
Oliver Cubbage, Dadi Einarsson, Jet Omoshebi, Aleksandar Pejic, Stefano Pepin and Gavin Round – The Witcher ("Episode 1") (Netflix); Jean-Claude Deguara, Egg VFX, Milk VFX, Real SFX and Gareth Spensley – Intergalactic (Sky One); Rasik Gorecha, Rob Harvey, Katherine Jamieson, John Kennedy, Alex Marlow and Sam Reed – Black Holes: Heart of Darkness (BBC Two); Adam Inglis, Sam Livingstone, Silja Momsen-Livingstone and Tom Payne – Earth at Night in Color (Apple TV+)	Ron Chakraborty, James Cross, Factory Fifteen, Tim Jones, Kenji Kawai and Fantasista Utamaro – Tokyo 2020 (BBC One); Ben Hanbury, Paul McDonnell, Tamsin McGee and Hugo Moss – Around the World in 80 Days (BBC One); Hello Yes and Gary Redford – All Creatures Great and Small (Channel 5); Ceri Sampson, Steve Waugh and Adam Wells – Lions Series: South Africa 2021 (Sky Sports Action)
Best Editing: Fiction	Best Editing: Factual
Sarah Brewerton – It's a Sin (Channel 4); Elen Pierce Lewis – Landscapers (Sky Atlantic); Andrew John McLelland – Line of Duty (BBC One); Dominic Strevens – A Very British Scandal (BBC One)	Danny Collins and Mark Hammill – 9/11: Inside the President's War Room (Apple TV+/BBC One); Doug Bryson – Mortimer & Whitehouse: Gone Fishing (BBC Two); Emma Lysaght – Grenfell: The Untold Story (Channel 4); Anna Price – Pandemic 2020 (BBC Two)
Best Emerging Talent: Fiction	Best Emerging Talent: Factual
Adjani Salmon (writer) – Dreaming Whilst Black (BBC Three); Nathan Bryon (writer) – Bloods (Sky One); Nida Manzoor (writer/director) – We Are Lady Parts (Channel 4); Runyararo Mapfumo (director) – Sex Education (Netflix)	Adam Brown (director) – Into the Storm: Surfing to Survive (Storyville) (BBC Four); Poppy Begum (director) – Queens of Rap (Channel 4); Sophie Cunningham (director/producer) – Look Away (Sky Documentaries); Hugh Davies (producer) – Football's Darkest Secret: The End of Silence (BBC One)
Special Award
TripleC

== See also ==
- 2022 British Academy Television Awards
