= David Carlyle =

Scottish actor

- Occupation: Actor
- Years active: 2010–present
- Spouse: Jason Carlyle-Mills (2022-present)

David Carlyle (born 1988) is a Scottish actor. Following a 10-year stage career, Carlyle starred in 2021 Channel 4 / HBO Max series It’s a Sin which led to his nomination as Best Supporting Actor in the 2022 British Academy Television Awards (BAFTA) and BAFTA Scotland Audience Award for his performance as Gregory Finch, aka Gloria. Carlyle also appeared in Bodyguard and Lip Service.

In 2019 Carlyle starred in Anthony Neilson’s The Tell-Tale Heart at The Royal National Theatre, London. The two have a long working relationship and also worked together on productions of Alice’s Adventures In Wonderland for The Royal Lyceum Theatre in Edinburgh in 2016 and Caledonia for the National Theatre of Scotland/Edinburgh International Festival in 2010. He performed in the award winning To Kill A Mockingbird at Regent’s Park Open Air Theatre and the Barbican. Other notable credits include playing the lead role of The Mayor in the Olivier Award nominated revival of The Government Inspector for Birmingham Rep Theatre, playing Tusenbach in Anya Reiss’ adaptation of Anton Chekhov’s Three Sisters alongside Paul McGann and Holliday Grainger and the award-winning The Monster in the Hall by David Greig for Glasgow’s historic Citizen’s Theatre/National Theatre of Scotland, the cast being awarded Best Ensemble at the 2011 Stage Awards.

== Personal life ==
Carlyle is gay. In interviews, Carlyle often talks about growing up gay in Scotland, such as in his interview on Out with Suzi Ruffell as well about his activity in the LGBTQ+ community. Carlyle worked with Virgin Radio to create a two-part documentary called Getting Out, exploring LGBTQ+ youth homelessness. He was interviewed by Graham Norton about the show in June 2022.

== Filmography ==
Year	Title	Role	Notes
2012	Lip Service	Angus	TV series
2018	Bodyguard	RASP Officer	TV mini series
2020	Casualty	Callum Coleman	TV series
2021	It's a Sin	Gregory Finch	TV mini series
2024	Dinosaur	Bo	TV series
2025	I Swear	Chris Achenbach	Feature film
2026	Mint	Tom	TV series

== Awards and nominations ==
Year	Nominated Work	Award	Category	Result	Ref.
2011	The Monster in the Hall	Stage Awards for Acting Excellence	Best Ensemble	Won	
2021		Proud Scotland Awards	Artist/Entertainer Award	Won	
2021	It's a Sin	British Academy Scotland Awards	Audience Award	Nominated	
2022	It's a Sin	British Academy Television Award	Best Supporting Actor	Nominated	

== Radio ==
Title	Role	Director	Format
The Tracks That Take Us Back	As himself		Anchor FM
Angst! The Teachings of Smart Town	Malcolm	Nicolas Jackson	Afonica for BBC Radio 4
Kitchen Confidential	Chef	Polly Thomas	BBC Radio 4
The Stroma Sessions	Nico Paolozzi	Nicolas Jackson	BBC Radio 3
Chernobyl	Reader	Jeremy Osborne	Sweet Talk / BBC

== Theatre ==
Production	Role	Director	Company
You Stupid Darkness	Jon	James Grieve	Paines Plough
The Tell Tale Heart	The Detective (lead)	Anthony Neilson	Royal National Theatre
The Outsider	Boss / Prosecutor	Abbey Wright	The Print Room
Alice's Adventures in Wonderland	White Rabbit / March Hare	Anthony Neilson	Royal Lyceum, Edinburgh
The Government Inspector	The Mayor (lead)	Roxanna Silbert	Birmingham Repertory Theatre and Tour
To Kill a Mockingbird	Nathan Radley / Mr Gilmer	Tim Sheader	Regents Park Open Air Theatre / UK Tour / Barbican Theatre
Three Sisters	Tusenbach	Russell Bolam	Southwark Playhouse
Carpe Diem	Mr Jeffrey	Jo McInnes	Royal National Theatre
Victoria	Oscar / Euan / Young Oscar	Philip Howard	Dundee Repertory Theatre
Somersaults	James	Russell Bolam	Finborough Theatre
Yellow Moon	Stag Lee	Guy Hollands	National Theatre of Scotland
Hansel and Gretel	Hansel	Guy Hollands	Citizens Theatre
Dead Heavy Fantastic	Stevie / Preacher	Matt Wilde	Everyman Theatre Liverpool
The Monster in the Hall	Lawrence Lofthouse	Guy Holland	Glasgow Citizens / Traverse Theatre
Caledonia	Joost / Various	Anthony Neilson	National Theatre of Scotland
The Wonderful World of Dissocia	Goat / Biffer	Matt Wilde	Unicorn Theatre
The White Devil	Flamenio	David Zoob	Shakspeare's Globe - Sam Wanamaker Festival
