= Jill Nalder =

Welsh actress and HIV/AIDS activist (born 1961)

Jill Nalder OBE
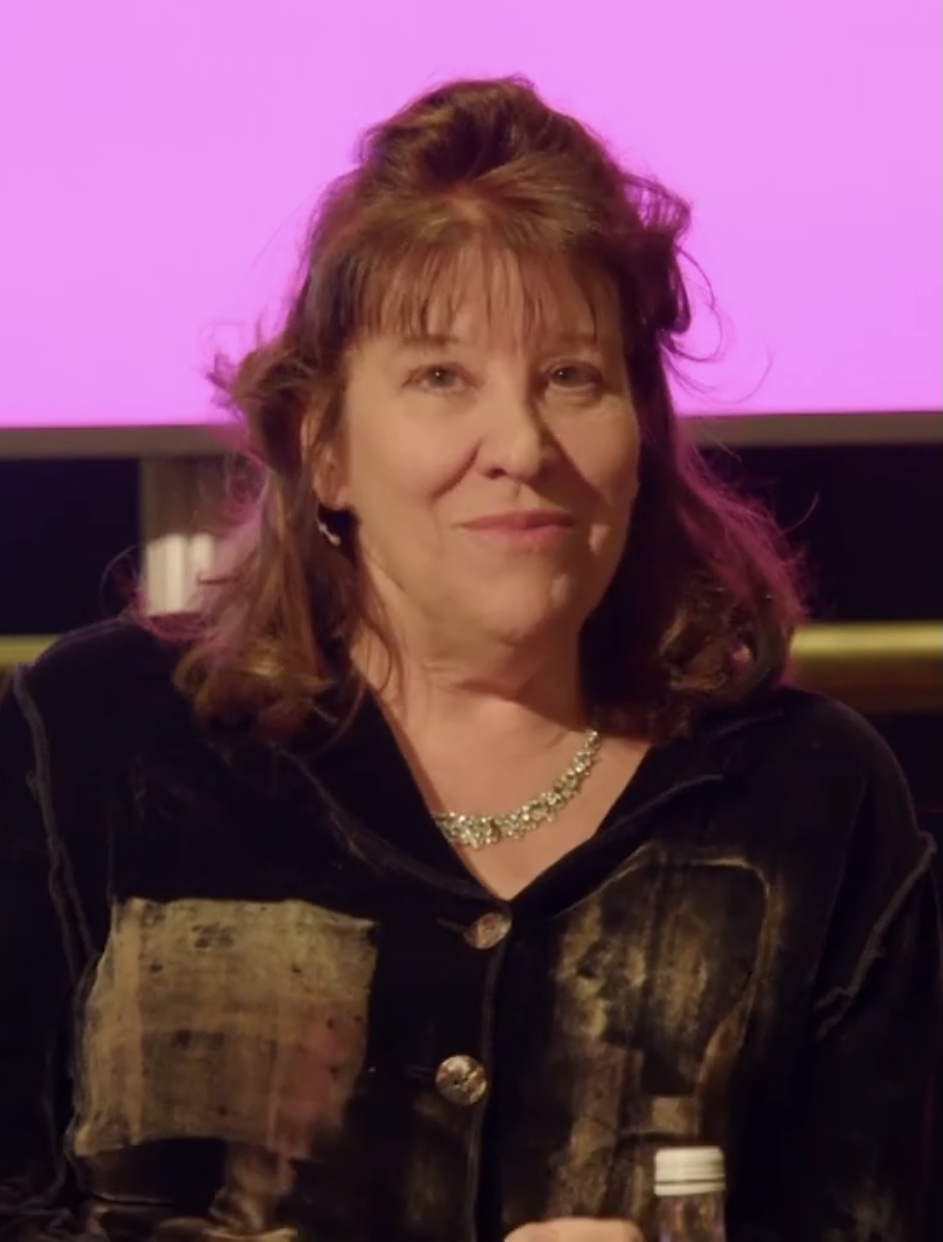
- Nalder at the British Library in 2022
- Born: 1961 (age 64–65); Neath, Wales
- Citizenship: British
- Education: Mountview Academy of Theatre Arts
- Occupation: Actress
- Years active: 1994–present
- Works: Les Misérables; Oliver! Finding Your Feet; It's a Sin

Jill Rhian Nalder (born 1961) is a Welsh theatre actress and HIV/AIDS activist.

She was the inspiration behind character Jill Baxter in the Channel 4 series It's a Sin.

== Early life ==
Nalder was brought up in Neath, Wales. In 1980 she moved to London where she trained at Mountview Academy of Theatre Arts in Crouch End. She graduated in 1982 with a qualification in acting and musical theatre.

== Acting career ==
Upon graduating, Nalder began performing in West End productions. She played Madame Thenardier in Les Miserables at the Palace Theatre and was in the original 1994 cast of Sam Mendes' production of Oliver! at the London Palladium. Nalder has also appeared in musical touring productions.

She appeared as a dancer in the 2017 film Finding Your Feet, directed by Richard Loncraine. She is one of the founder members of The WestEnders, a musical theatre group with a repertoire of songs drawn from the West End and Broadway musicals.

== HIV/AIDS activism ==
Nalder became involved in HIV/AIDS activism while living in London in the 1980s at the height of the AIDS crisis. With other members of the West End theatre community, Nalder participated in fundraising campaigns, including cabaret shows and performances in Soho, to raise money to support AIDS awareness and research. Nalder also supported gay men suffering from AIDS and made numerous visits to AIDS patients in hospitals around London, including Middlesex Hospital, and Chelsea and Westminster Hospital's AIDS unit.

In 2021, screenwriter and producer Russell T Davies based the character of Jill Baxter in his Channel 4 television miniseries It's A Sin, on Nalder's life at the time. Nalder and Davies first met at the age of 14 while performing in youth theatre in West Glamorgan in Wales and remained friends thereafter. She shared her life stories with Davies as he was developing his script. The Hampstead flat that Nalder shared with three fellow students during the 1980s inspired the "Pink Palace" flat in the series. The character is played by Lydia West, while Nalder plays her mother Christine Baxter.

Nalder wrote the book Love From the Pink Palace, published in 2022 and shortlisted for the 2023 RSL Christopher Bland Prize. She is also a patron of The Sussex Beacon, a Brighton based charity supporting people living with HIV and AIDS.

In December 2024 Nalder was awarded an OBE for services to people with HIV and AIDS.

== Personal life ==
Nalder is single and lives in Cambridgeshire.
