= Inside Man (2022 TV series) =

2022 British crime television series

- Genre: Drama; Thriller; Dark comedy
- Created by: Steven Moffat
- Directed by: Paul McGuigan
- Starring: David Tennant; Stanley Tucci; Dolly Wells; Lydia West
- Composer: David Arnold
- Country of origin: United Kingdom
- Original language: English
- No. of episodes: 4

Production
- Executive producers: Steven Moffat; Sue Vertue; Alex Mercer
- Producer: Sue Vertue
- Running time: 60 minutes
- Production company: Hartswood Films

Original release
- Network: BBC One
- Release: 26 September – 4 October 2022

Inside Man is a British four-part television thriller drama developed by Steven Moffat. The four-episode series premiered on 26 September 2022, and was broadcast on BBC One. It was released on Netflix in the US on 31 October 2022.

== Cast ==
- David Tennant as Harry Watling, a British vicar forced into a difficult situation
- Stanley Tucci as Jefferson Grieff, a former criminology professor on death row in an Arizona prison
- Dolly Wells as Janice Fife, Ben's Mathematics tutor
- Lydia West as Beth Davenport, a crime journalist
- Lyndsey Marshal as Mary Watling, Harry’s wife
- Dylan Baker as Casey, a prison warden
- Atkins Estimond as Dillon Kempton, a serial killer on death row in Jefferson’s prison who acts as Grieff's assistant
- Louis Oliver as Ben Watling, Harry’s teenage son
- Eke Chukwu as Keith, a guard at the prison
- Kate Dickie as Morag, an acquaintance of Jefferson in England
- Mark Quartley as Edgar, Harry’s deeply troubled verger
- Tilly Vosburgh as Hilda, Edgar’s mother
- Boo Golding as DS Clyde

== Production ==
Filming locations included St Andrew's Church in Farnham, Godalming Railway Station, Godalming, outside the Beehive Pub in Bedfont Middlesex, Broad Street in Wokingham, John Hanson Community School in Andover and Welcome Break Fleet Services in Fleet.

== Episodes ==
No.	Title	Directed by	Written by	Original release date	UK viewers (millions)
1	"Episode 1"	Paul McGuigan	Steven Moffat	26 September 2022	3.93
British crime journalist Beth Davenport befriends Janice Fife, a mathematics tutor, following an incident on the London Tube. In an Arizona prison, Jefferson Grieff, a former professor of criminology who was convicted of murdering his wife, lives on death row awaiting execution. He is visited by people who want to hear his insights regarding criminal cases. In England, village vicar Harry Watling agrees to hold a USB drive for Edgar, a suicidal young parishioner. Janice arrives at the vicarage to tutor Harry's son, Ben, and needs to transfer a file from her laptop. Ben gives Edgar's USB drive to Janice, who is shocked by its content. Ben assumes it contains pornography and tries to protect his father by taking the blame for it. Janice privately shows Harry that what it contains is child pornography. Harry, unable to convince Janice that Ben is innocent and horrified at the prospect of her going to the police, imprisons her in the vicarage cellar. Beth wishes to write an article about Grieff and travels to Arizona to interview him, but Grieff, feeling remorse for murdering his wife, asks Beth to refrain from giving him publicity.
2	"Episode 2"	Paul McGuigan	Steven Moffat	27 September 2022	3.09
Beth, concerned that Janice is no longer answering her phone, goes back to Grieff to ask for advice. As a test, Grieff offers to let her observe his next case in return for never mentioning Janice again, to which she reluctantly agrees. A middle-aged woman, accompanied by her daughter, asks Grieff to help her find her husband, who vanished five years ago. With assistance on the outside from a friend of his and from Beth, Grieff proves that it was the woman herself who murdered the man. He tells Beth he needs her to return to England to help with Janice’s case, which he has already begun investigating. Harry and his wife, Mary, continue to hold Janice prisoner in the cellar, but know that her absence is sure to be noticed the next evening. Harry tries to record Edgar’s confession that the USB drive is his, intending to free Janice once he has the recording, but Edgar refuses to co-operate. Harry then decides that his only choice is to turn himself in to the police as a paedophile. That night, Edgar hangs himself, leaving a suicide note saying that Harry is actually protecting someone else.
3	"Episode 3"	Paul McGuigan	Steven Moffat	3 October 2022	3.32
Grieff is informed that his execution date has been set; he is to die in three weeks. He offers to reveal the location of his dead wife’s severed head in exchange for a postponement. Beth returns to the UK and is picked up by Morag, an associate of Grieff’s. Grieff tells Beth what he has learned about Janice from her social media posts. To protect Ben, Harry fabricates evidence that he himself is a paedophile. Harry is questioned by the police about Edgar's suicide note, but the police do not believe Harry's claim that Edgar was the paedophile mentioned in the note. Janice tries to turn Harry and Mary against each other. She convinces them that to gain time they will need to send an email to her sister postponing an intended Skype call. She gives them the password to her account, and Mary sends the email. Harry and Mary decide to kill Janice by placing a portable heater next to her which leaks carbon monoxide, but Harry does not realize that Ben is with Janice when he leaves it there and then locks the cellar door. Mary realizes that the email was a trick by Janice.
4	"Episode 4"	Paul McGuigan	Steven Moffat	4 October 2022	3.18
Grieff provokes his dead wife's father into attacking him in the prison’s visitation room and then, pretending to be afraid, gives him false information on where to find her head. Beth and Morag set themselves up in Janice’s flat. Janice pleads with Ben to call the police, but he does not want his father arrested. Mary enters Janice's flat to put Janice's laptop there and is confronted by Beth; she runs away but is hit by a truck and dies. Intoxicated by carbon monoxide, Ben is angered upon realizing that Janice had planned to report him to the police as a paedophile, and strikes her in the head with a hammer. Harry opens the cellar door to check whether Janice is dead and is surprised to find Ben there; he sends Ben away to protect him. When Janice begins moving, Harry takes the hammer and tries to kill her, but is tackled by Beth. Three masked men then enter the cellar, having been sent there to find the head of Grieff’s wife. Harry is arrested for his crimes, but Ben is not charged. Janice goes to Arizona to ask Grieff for advice on how to murder her husband.

== Reception ==
=== Critical reception ===
Inside Man was rated 67% on Rotten Tomatoes based on 24 reviews. The website's critics consensus reads, "Inside Man's ambitions are undercut by clunky and predictable plotting, although Stanley Tucci and David Tennant's performances are welcome compensations for viewers who enjoy twisty thrillers." On Metacritic, it has a score of 64/100 based on 6 critic reviews. Top critic Graeme Blundell from The Australian writes, "It's superbly acted by a bunch of experienced actors who know just what kind of heightened style is required here, directed in immersive style by the accomplished McGuigan, and thoroughly enjoyable. Just hold that wine glass." Charles Hartford from A Geek Community writes, "Inside Man Season 1 delivers a gripping tale that is well worth its short, four-hour runtime...The series pulls the viewer into its depths as it explores how far people will go when they are caught in the wrong place at the wrong time." The Guardian described it as being a "funny and typically meaty mystery from Steven Moffat". Pat Stacey, writing in the Irish Independent said, "Probably the most foolish scene of all came in Tuesday’s finale when Mary threatens journalist Beth (Lydia West) ... with a breadknife while making 'whoosh' sounds. This nudged Inside Man into full-blown sitcom territory. Strange, that, since Moffat seemed to want to say something serious about human nature and people's capacity for violence." Anita Singh of The Daily Telegraph said, "Moffat can throw any amount of good lines or clever little plot twists into this show, but it is built on a flaw so fundamental that it's impossible to get past it."

The series features Steven Moffat's own son, Louis Oliver, whose performance as Ben, the vicar's son, was described by Radio Times as "show stealing".

=== Viewing figures ===
The first episode was watched 5,028,000 times on iPlayer alone during 2022, making it the 7th most viewed individual programme on the platform that year.
