= Lydia West =

British actress (born 1993)

- Born: Lydia Dorothy West; 24 June 1993 (age 33); Islington, London, England
- Education: Identity School of Acting
- Occupation: Actress
- Years active: 2019–present

Lydia Dorothy West (born 24 June 1993) is a British actress. She is known for her roles in the BBC One series Years and Years and the Channel 4 series It's a Sin, the latter of which earned her a BAFTA nomination.

== Early life ==
West is from London. Her maternal grandparents are Irish, and her father is from Montserrat. Her mother is a nurse and her father works in charity. She has an older sister and an older brother.

West trained in ballet, tap, jazz and contemporary dance as a teenager, but quit after a foot injury. After graduating from university with a degree in business, she worked as a personal assistant and trained part-time at Identity School of Acting (IDSA).

== Career ==
After graduation from IDSA, West was cast as Bethany Bisme-Lyons in Russell T Davies' 2019 BBC One and HBO series Years and Years. She starred in the 2021 Channel 4 series It's a Sin, also by Davies. She played Jill Baxter, who is loosely based on one of Davies' friends (Jill Nalder). Davies called her character "the heart of the story", a view echoed by Jack King of I-D who described the character as the "de facto matriarch". Her performance was described as a "standout" one by i.

In 2022, West appeared as Monique Thompson in the Apple TV+ series Suspicion and Reilly Clayton in Mike Myers' Netflix comedy The Pentaverate. She has roles in the films Love Again and Coffee Wars, as well as the series Inside Man and Gray.

In 2024, West co-starred alongside Nicola Coughlan in the Channel 4 and Tubi series Big Mood, a "vivacious and rebellious portrayal of female friendship when infiltrated by the complexities of a serious mental illness." In September 2025, Channel 4 announced that West had been made an executive producer for Big Mood's second season.

== Filmography ==
=== Film ===
| Year | Title | Role | Notes |
|---|---|---|---|
| 2021 | People You May Know | Rachel | Short film |
| 2023 | Love Again | Lisa Scott | |
| 2023 | Coffee Wars | Bridget | |

=== Television ===
| Year | Title | Role | Notes |
|---|---|---|---|
| 2019 | Years and Years | Bethany Bisme-Lyons | 6 episodes |
| 2020 | Dracula | Lucy Westenra | Episode 3: "The Dark Compass" |
| 2021 | It's a Sin | Jill Baxter | 5 episodes |
| 2022 | Suspicion | Monique Thompson | 4 episodes |
| 2022 | The Pentaverate | Reilly Clayton | 6 episodes |
| 2022 | Inside Man | Beth Davenport | 4 episodes |
| 2023 | Gray | Sara Beckham | 8 episodes |
| 2024–present | Big Mood | Eddie | 12 episodes |
| 2025 | He Had It Coming | Elise | Lead role & exec. producer; 8 episodes |

=== Audio ===
| Year | Title | Role | Notes |
|---|---|---|---|
| 2020 | Doctor Who: The Sorcerer of Albion | Vivien | Big Finish: Donna Noble: Kidnapped! |
| 2020 | The Wizard of Oz | Dorothy Gale | Audible |

== Awards and nominations ==
| Year | Award | Category | Work | Result | Ref |
|---|---|---|---|---|---|
| 2021 | Monte-Carlo Television Festival | Best Actress | It's a Sin | Won | |
| 2022 | BPG Awards | Best Actress | It's a Sin | Nominated | |
| 2022 | BPG Awards | Breakthrough Award (Note: Shared.) | It's a Sin | Nominated | |
| 2022 | British Academy Television Awards | Best Actress | It's a Sin | Nominated | |
