= It's a Sin (TV series) =

British television series by Russell T Davies

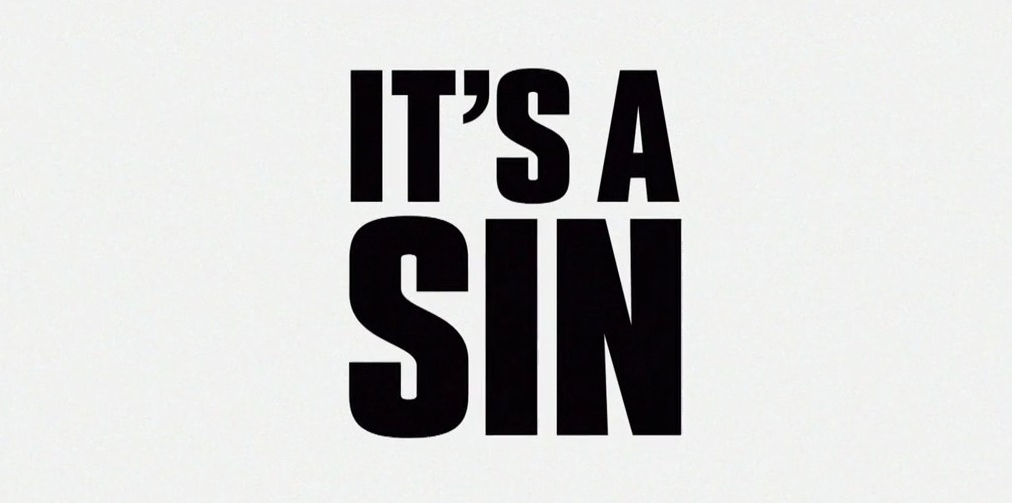
- Genre: Drama
- Created by: Russell T Davies
- Written by: Russell T Davies
- Directed by: Peter Hoar
- Starring: Olly Alexander; David Carlyle; Nathaniel Curtis; Shaun Dooley; Omari Douglas; Lydia West; Callum Scott Howells; Tracy-Ann Oberman; Lydia West; Keeley Hawes; Neil Patrick Harris; Stephen Fry
- Composer: Murray Gold
- Country of origin: United Kingdom
- Original language: English
- No. of episodes: 5

Production
- Executive producers: Russell T Davies; Peter Hoar; Nicola Shindler
- Producer: Phil Collinson
- Running time: 46–48 minutes
- Production company: Red Production Company

Original release
- Network: Channel 4
- Release: 22 January – 19 February 2021

It's a Sin is a British drama television series written by Russell T Davies. Set in London between 1981 and 1991, it depicts the lives of a group of gay men and their friends during the HIV/AIDS crisis in the United Kingdom. It's a Sin features a main cast consisting of Olly Alexander, Omari Douglas, Callum Scott Howells, Lydia West, and Nathaniel Curtis. Other actors cast were David Carlyle, Keeley Hawes, Shaun Dooley, Tracy-Ann Oberman, Neil Patrick Harris and Stephen Fry. The series was directed by Peter Hoar, produced by Red Production Company, and premiered in the United Kingdom on Channel 4 on 22 January 2021.

Its subject matter made the series a difficult sell to broadcasters. BBC One and ITV passed on the series, and Channel 4 took it on only after their commissioning editor of drama, Lee Mason, fought for it and the series was shortened from a planned eight episodes to five. Principal photography commenced on 7 October 2019. Despite its London setting, It's a Sin was filmed mainly in Manchester, with other locations used in Liverpool, Bolton, Eccles, Bangor, and Rhos-on-Sea. The series was executive produced by Davies, Hoar, and Nicola Shindler, with Phil Collinson serving as producer.

The show received critical acclaim for its emotional scenes, writing, performances and accurate depiction of HIV/AIDS. All episodes were released to Channel 4's online streaming service All 4 (now simply known as Channel 4), where it was viewed in its entirety more than 6.5 million times; making it the most binge-watched show to stream on the platform. The first episode also became Channel 4's biggest drama launch. The show was also credited for creating an upsurge in HIV testing in the weeks after its release. It was the most nominated show at the 2022 British Academy Television Awards, receiving twelve nominations, including Best Mini-Series and winning Best Director: Fiction for Peter Hoar.

== Premise ==
The series follows a group of gay men who move to London in 1981. They form a friendship group but the fast developing HIV/AIDS crisis in the United Kingdom impacts their lives. Over five episodes the group is shown living through an entire decade until 1991, as they become determined to live fiercely despite the threat HIV poses to them.

== Cast and characters ==
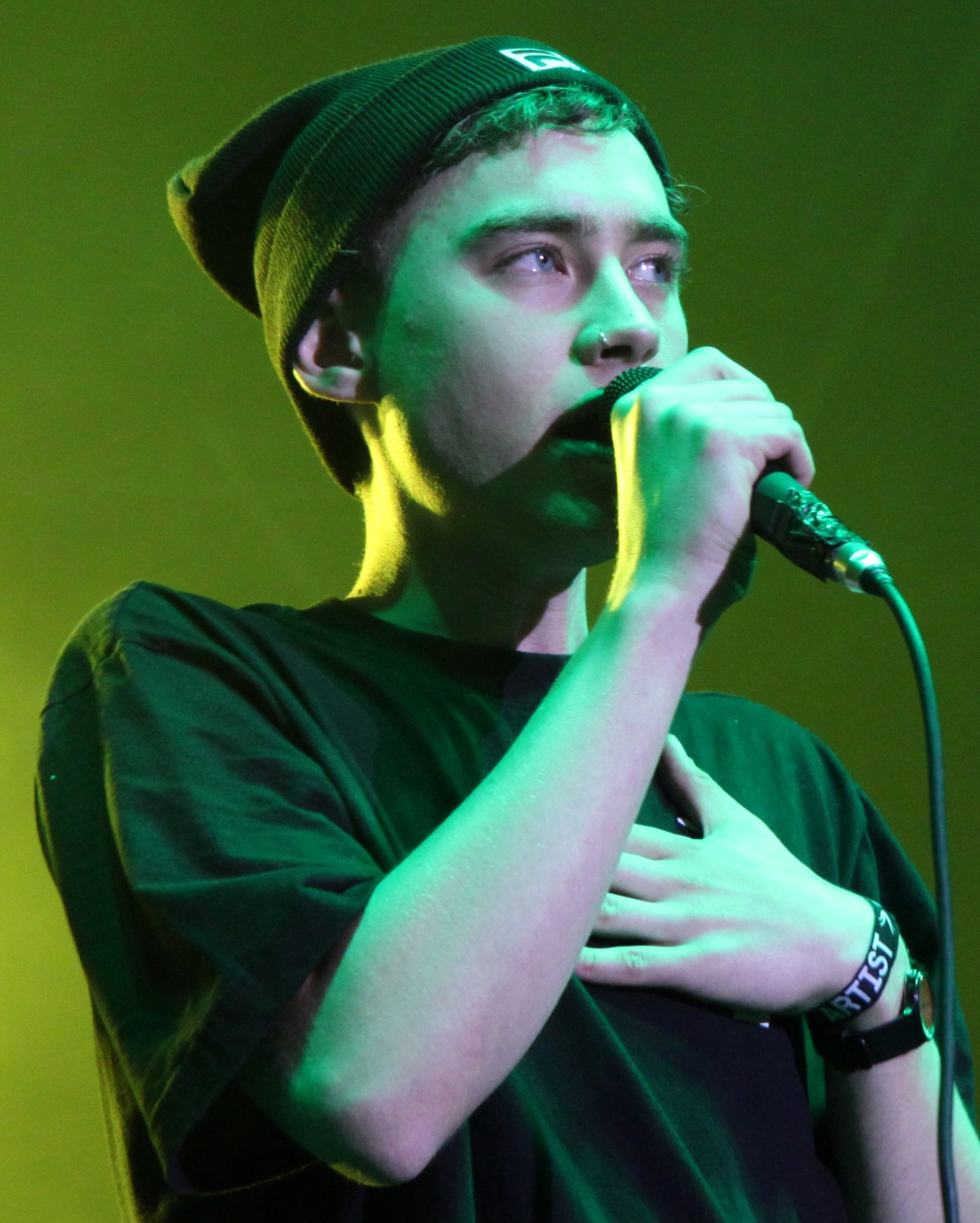
Olly Alexander

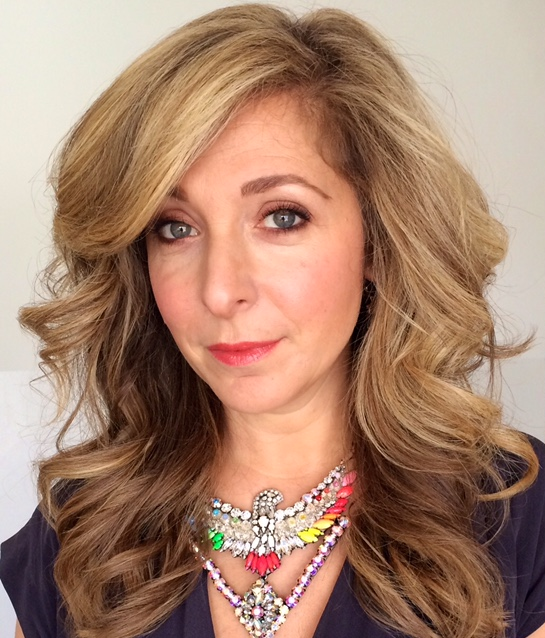
Tracy-Ann Oberman

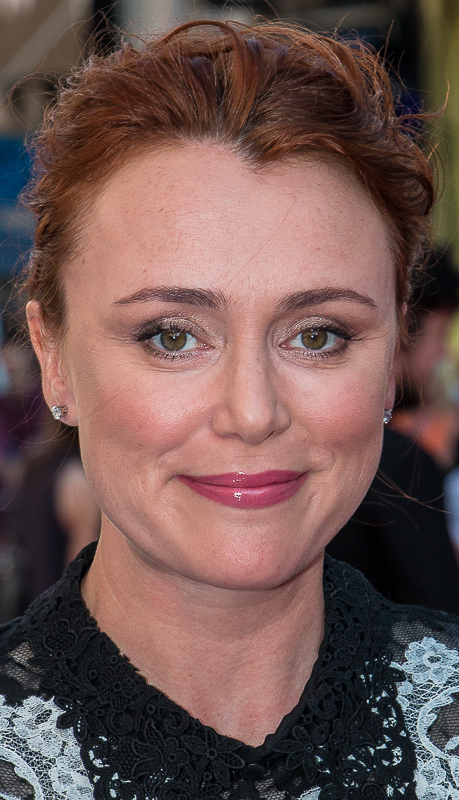
Keeley Hawes

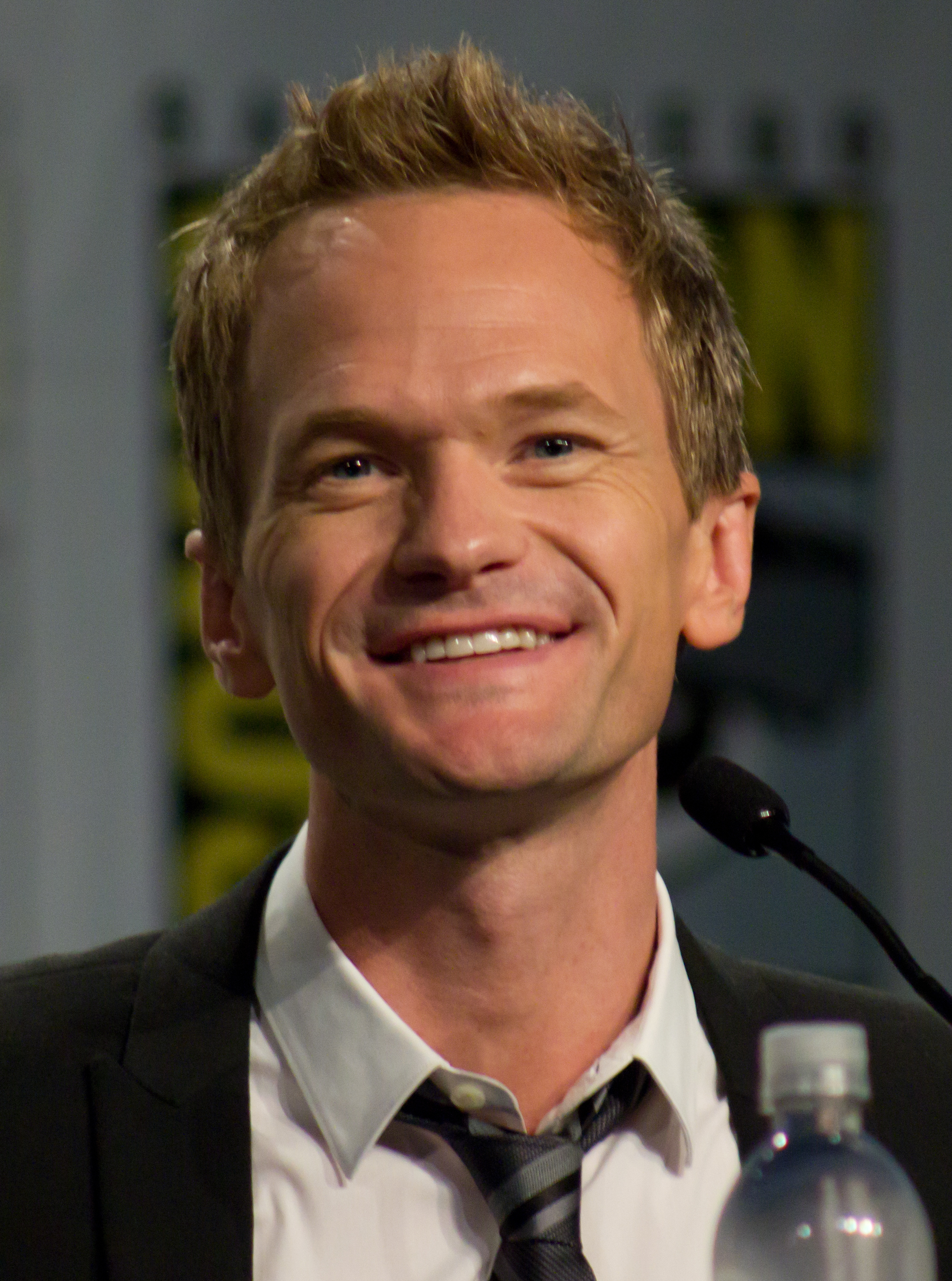
Neil Patrick Harris

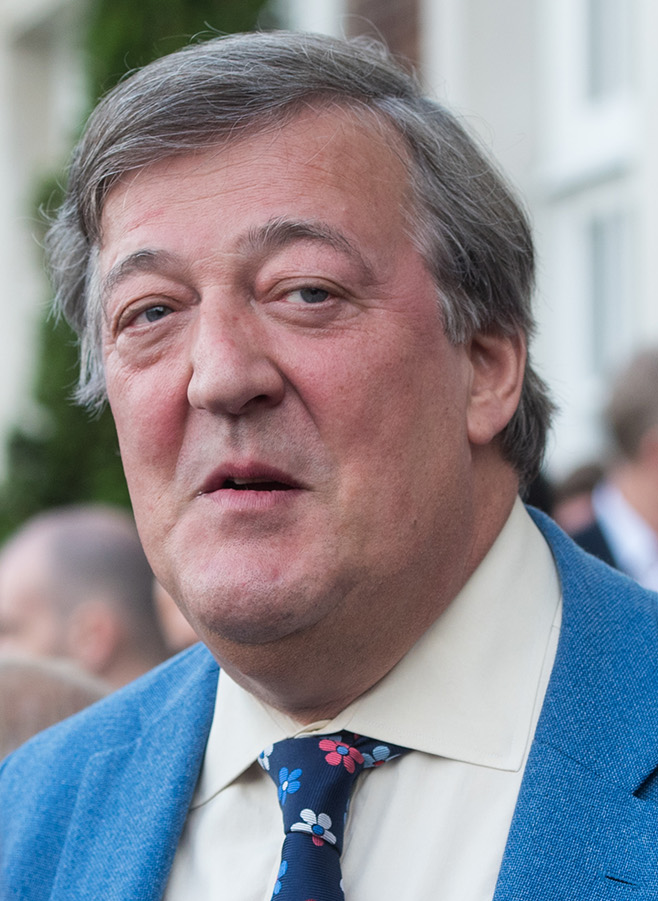
Stephen Fry

- Olly Alexander as Ritchie Tozer
- David Carlyle as Gregory "Gloria" Finch
- Nathaniel Curtis as Ash Mukherjee
- Shaun Dooley as Clive Tozer
- Omari Douglas as Roscoe Babatunde
- Callum Scott Howells as Colin "Gladys Pugh" Morris-Jones
- Tracy-Ann Oberman as Carol Carter
- Lydia West as Jill Baxter
- Keeley Hawes as Valerie Tozer
- Neil Patrick Harris as Henry Coltrane
- Stephen Fry as Arthur Garrison MP

- Moya Brady as Millie
- Neil Ashton as Grizzle
- Nicholas Blane as Mr Hart
- William Richardson as Mr Brewster
- Ashley McGuire as Lorraine Fletcher
- Calvin A. Dean as Clifford
- Nathaniel Hall as Donald Bassett
- Jill Nalder as Christine Baxter
- Andria Doherty, as Eileen Morris-Jones
- Nathan Sussex as Pete
- Toto Bruin as Lucy Tozer
- Shaniqua Okwok as Solly Babatunde
- Michelle Greenidge as Rosa Babatunde
- Delroy Brown as Oscar Babatunde
- Ken Christiansen as Karl Benning
- David Fleeshman as father

== Episodes ==
No.	Title	Directed by	Written by	Original release date	UK viewers (millions)
1	"Episode 1"	Peter Hoar	Russell T Davies	22 January 2021	5.02
1981. Five 18-year-olds- Ritchie, Jill, Ash, Colin and Roscoe who come from different walks of life move to London, where they all meet, form bonds quickly and move into a flat they name The Pink Palace. They begin exploring their identities and becoming who they truly are, but a new rare disease threatens their futures.
2	"Episode 2"	Peter Hoar	Russell T Davies	29 January 2021	5.11
1983. Despite education outreach by AIDS activists and growing reports of gay men dying from a new sickness, Ritchie remains in denial and spreads conspiracy theories and AIDS denialism. An old friend in their group has some devastating news of his own when Jill visits him. Colin and his boss go on a business trip to New York, which has unexpected results.
3	"Episode 3"	Peter Hoar	Russell T Davies	5 February 2021	5.26
1986. The Pink Palace flatmates are working, falling in love and finding their way in the world. Colin's health takes a turn and he is diagnosed with AIDS, forcing the group to confront the reality of the situation. Ritchie has a fling with a fellow actor while Jill works at an underground crisis hotline for HIV/AIDS infection. Roscoe tries to have a profitable affair with a closeted Conservative Party politician, Arthur, but it backfires. The group decide to get tested, but only 2 of them receive good news.
4	"Episode 4"	Peter Hoar	Russell T Davies	12 February 2021	5.84
March 1988. Fearing he might have contracted AIDS, Ritchie decides to make a spontaneous trip home. Ash is irritated after his job is forced to abide by new rules forbidding public institutions from informing children about homosexuality under Section 28. After Arthur belittles their relationship, Roscoe takes a personal stand against Prime Minister Margaret Thatcher and abruptly ends their relationship. Meanwhile, protests begin against pharmaceutical companies who are profiting off the disease. Ritchie appears as a soldier called Trooper Linden in a Doctor Who episode titled "Regression of the Daleks", which features him filming a scene fighting Daleks. This was in remembrance of the actor Dursley McLinden, who appeared in the actual Doctor Who episode Remembrance of the Daleks and later died of AIDS. The scene was inspired by the episode Resurrection of the Daleks.
5	"Episode 5"	Peter Hoar	Russell T Davies	19 February 2021	6.10
November 1991. HIV/AIDS is at an all-time high. Ritchie's condition worsens and other friends continue to die. As they face the hardest days of their lives, the remaining flatmates band together to try to save Ritchie before it's too late.

== Production ==
=== Development ===
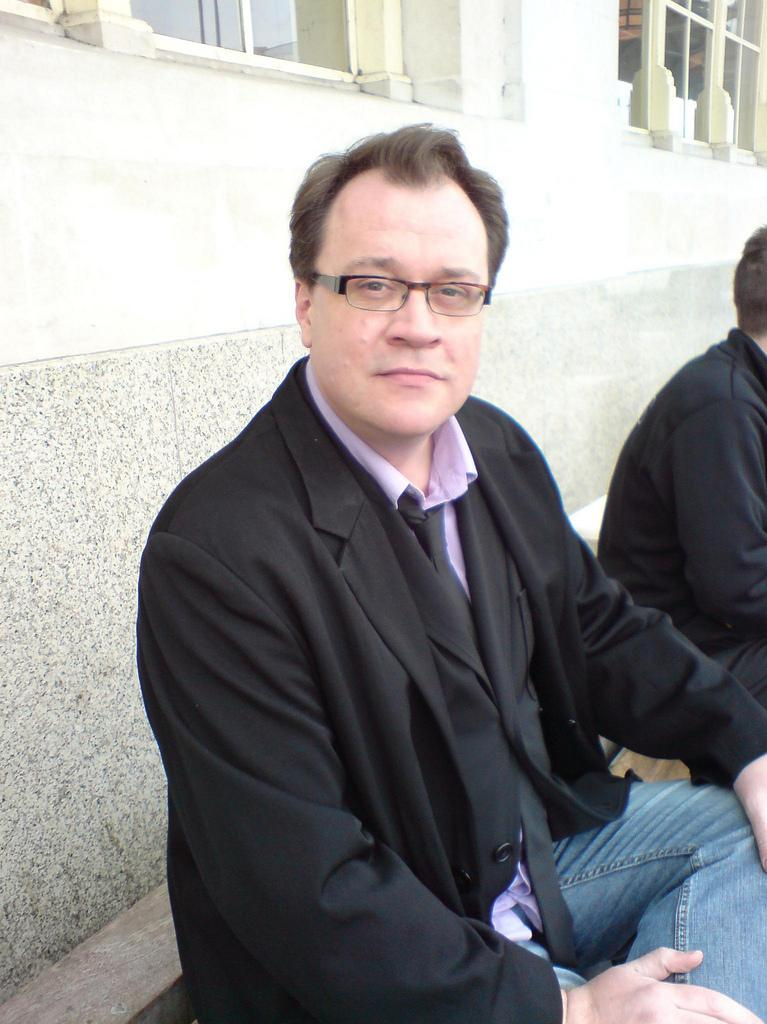
It's a Sin was written and developed by Russell T Davies.

Davies' plans to write a series depicting gay life during the 1980s and the UK AIDS crisis were based on his own and his friends' experiences, and to commemorate the generation who died from the illness. Davies first publicised these plans in January 2015, telling Ben Dowell from Radio Times in 2016 that it was "the most research-based piece I will ever do". Davies has claimed that the script was initially difficult to pitch to broadcasters due to the "tough" subject matter. Davies recalls being asked by a producer to start the show on an AIDS ward in the 90s, then flashing back to the 80s. He refused the idea, calling it 'unbelievably crass'. Davies spent a year trying to secure a deal, with two broadcasters declining to commission the show. It was originally pitched to Davies' first choice, Channel 4, but they declined to commission it. BBC One was then offered the series but they too declined, and ITV decided that they were not ready to broadcast such a series. Channel 4's Commissioning Editor of Drama, Lee Mason, had originally wanted his network to commission the show. He waited for a significant staff change before successfully pitching the idea. Davies originally envisaged the show as an eight-part drama; Channel 4 requested that it be limited to four episodes, and Davies was able to negotiate five.

On 22 August 2018 at the Edinburgh International Television Festival, Channel 4's commission of Davies' script was announced. The show was still titled The Boys and it was confirmed that production would commence in 2019. Davies developed the series with Nicola Shindler, who served as Executive Producer and had the assistance of her Red Production Company. Phil Collinson was hired as the show's producer and Peter Hoar as a director. Murray Gold was hired to create the music score for the series. In early 2020, it was revealed that the show was tentatively titled Boys instead of The Boys as previously reported. The original working title was then changed because it was too similar to the Amazon series The Boys.

=== Casting ===
The majority of the show's casting was announced in October 2019. Olly Alexander, a vocalist from the band Years & Years was cast as Ritchie Tozer, a gay teenager who moves to London in 1981 during the early days of the crisis. In his television debut, Omari Douglas was cast as Roscoe Babatunde, a man from a Nigerian family who disown him because of his sexuality. Welsh actor Callum Scott Howells was cast in his first television role playing Colin Morris-Jones, a gay man from Wales. Lydia West plays Jill Baxter in the series. She would regularly host 1980s themed gatherings to help the cast cope with the show's emotional subject. Nathaniel Curtis successfully auditioned for the part of Ash Mukherjee. He was working in theatre when he first discovered the role and said he "instantly fell in love" with the script. David Carlyle plays Gregory Finch, a "vibrant" and "naughty" character who works as a bus conductor.

American actor Neil Patrick Harris plays Henry Coltrane, a character who dies from AIDS in the first episode. The actor said he was pleased with his casting and "incredibly proud" to appear in the series. Keeley Hawes and Shaun Dooley signed up to play Ritchie's parents Valerie and Clive Tozer. Stephen Fry was cast as Arthur Garrison, a Conservative MP who refuses to acknowledge his homosexuality. Fry was keen to appear in the series because he believed it paid tribute to friends that died of HIV. Producers cast Nathaniel Hall as Donald Bassett. Hall plays an HIV-positive character and is himself HIV-positive. Other castings included Andria Doherty as Eileen Morris-Jones and Tracy-Ann Oberman as Carol Carter, an acting agent who signs up Ritchie.

It's a Sin's cast includes a number of openly gay and queer performers including Alexander, Fry, Harris, Curtis, Howells, Hall and Carlyle. This casting was intentional; Davies stated "for my one programme, for these five hours, I wanted to create a safe space where gay actors could voluntarily come in and be themselves." Certain characters were influenced by Davies' real-life friends. The character of Ritchie is inspired by actor Dursley McLinden, who died of AIDS in 1995, while West's character, Jill Baxter, is "very loosely" based on Davies and McLinden's mutual friend Jill Nalder, who appears in the show as Baxter's mother. In the fourth episode, Ritchie appears in a fictional Doctor Who episode as a tribute to McLinden, who appeared in Remembrance of the Daleks (1988).

=== Filming ===
Principal photography began in Manchester on 7 October 2019. Red Production Company went into partnership with Screen Manchester to accommodate filming. Bobby Cochrane, development manager at Screen Manchester told Adam Maidment from the Manchester Evening News that "we worked very closely with the production on their various filming applications across Manchester." It's a Sin is set in 1980s England and to reflect the times a series of period props were introduced to outdoor filming locations. Manchester transport officials helped the production gain necessary control over specific areas. Filming took place at Paton Street, Victoria Baths, The Embassy Club on Rochdale Road, The Star and Garter, the Thirsty Scholar on New Wakefield Street and Manchester Crematorium on Barlow Moor Road. Additional filming then took place at a shopping centre in Eccles, a residential street in Heaton Moor and Le Mans Crescent in Bolton.

Filming took place in the city centre of Liverpool in January 2020. The location shoot commenced on Water Street for scenes which appeared as New York City in the show. The street was closed to the public and rows of yellow taxis were parked in the street. In addition vintage cars and a New York-style hot dog cart were placed at the scene. Filming at the Cunard Building on Brunswick Street doubled as a London hotel. A series of 2D and CG VFX techniques were used to add to the location's authenticity. Additional interiors were filmed at the Old Wentworth High School in Eccles. Hospital scenes featured in the show were filmed at this location. Filming also took place in Rhos-on-Sea, Wales, which doubled for the Isle of Wight. Scenes featuring a beach and pier were filmed in the Welsh city of Bangor. Filming concluded on 31 January 2020, two months before the official lockdown in the UK due to the COVID-19 pandemic.

== Release and reception ==
A first-look image was released on 14 January 2020, via a press release given to those in attendance at a Channel 4 press event. The series was originally scheduled for a 2020 release. On 2 October 2020, Channel 4 released the first official teaser trailer and with a statement that it would be broadcast in 2021. On 17 December 2020, a full trailer was released.

In Ireland and the UK, the series premiered on 22 January 2021 on Channel 4. Shortly after the broadcast of the first episode, all episodes were available to stream for free on Channel 4's on-demand streaming service, All 4. Coinciding with the broadcast, Alexander's band Years & Years released a cover of the song "It's a Sin", which was originally performed by the Pet Shop Boys. The release, used to promote the series was also used to raise money for the George House Trust, a charity supporting those living with HIV. It was released on DVD and Blu-ray in the United Kingdom on 22 February 2021.

It was announced in December 2019 that HBO Max had joined the production and acquired the US rights. It was released in the United States as an HBO Max Original on 18 February 2021.

Red Production Company partnered with All3Media for international distribution of It's a Sin. In Australia it was released on the streaming service Stan on 23 January 2021 as well as TVNZ in New Zealand. Amazon Prime Video acquired the rights to stream in Canada and aired on Canal+ in France. Other countries the drama has been distributed to include South Korea on its streaming service Watcha Play, Nederlandse Publieke Omroep in Netherlands, RTBF in French-speaking Belgium, Canvas in Flemish Belgium and Amedia in Russia. In Greece, the series was shown back to back on Cosmote TV on 21 March and is also available watch on-demand via their platform. In Germany, it aired on public broadcaster ZDFneo and its streaming platform.

=== Ratings ===
The first episode was watched live by 1.6 million viewers on Channel 4, a benchmark for a drama launch previously hit a year earlier by Deadwater Fell. It was the network's best-performing drama among young viewers (16–34) in three years. Catch-up views hit 2.5 million within three days of the live broadcast.

Channel 4 revealed on 4 February that the series had gained 6.5 million views on All 4 thus far, giving the streaming service its highest monthly figures to date for January, nearly doubling the previous figure. The series became the third biggest on the platform to date and its "most binged new series ever"; the first episode was the platform's biggest drama launch on record. By 1 March, this number had gone up to 18.9 million.

Official ratings are taken from BARB, utilising the four-screen dashboard which includes viewers who watched the programme on laptops, smartphones, and tablets. Pre-transmission data is included for all episodes other than episode 1 as the full box-set of the series was released on All 4 after the transmission of Episode 1 on Channel 4.

=== Impact ===
The show created an upsurge in testing. The Terrence Higgins Trust charity reported that 8,200 HIV testing kits were ordered in a single day. The previous high total for a single day was only 2,800. Philip Normal produced a commemorative t-shirt featuring the slogan "La", which was a much used catchphrase in the show. The t-shirt helped raise £100,000 for the Terrence Higgins Trust. Alexander has expressed gratitude that the series was shown, saying "young gay people can't believe it happened".

David Opie from Digital Spy reported that the show helped normalise the portrayal of gay sex on mainstream television. On 22 January 2021, a story published via The Sun raised concerns that tabloid news was unfairly reporting on gay sex. The original headline read "So much sex: It's a Sin viewers shocked by drama's explicit sex montage with raunchy threesome and oral sex." The sensational headline received criticism from the public who claimed the newspaper favoured heterosexual scenes. Journalists at The Sun responded by altering the article's wording to praise the series. They also issued an apology via LGBT news website PinkNews.

=== Critical reception ===
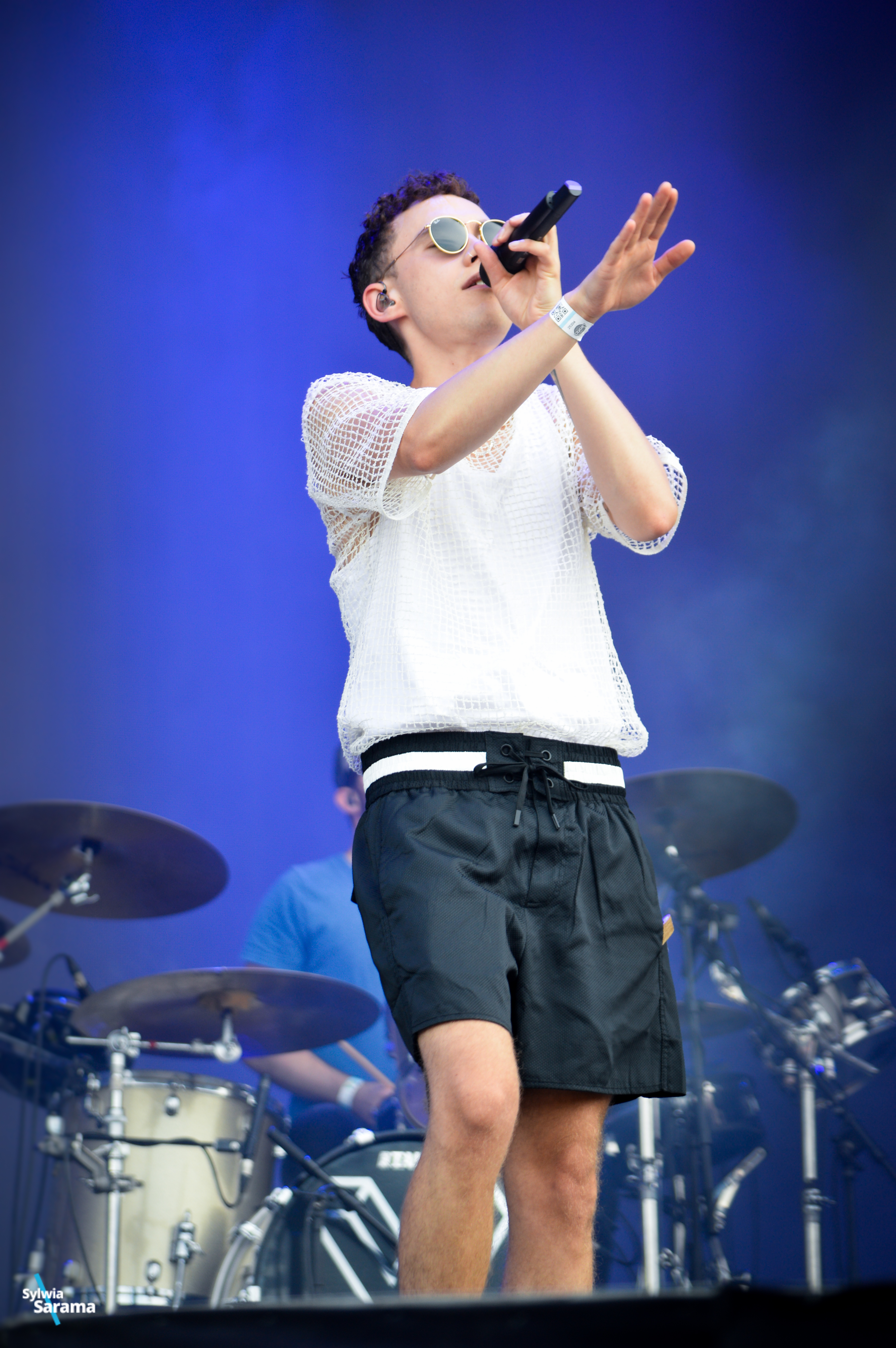
Olly Alexander was praised for his performance as Ritchie Tozer, earning Best Actor nominations from BAFTA TV, Critics' Choice and Independent Spirit.

The series was described as a "bonafide hit" upon release in the UK. Rotten Tomatoes reported an approval rating of 97% based on 75 reviews, with an average rating of 9.30/10. The website's critics consensus reads, "Propelled by an exquisite cast, empathetic writing, and a distinct visual style, It's a Sin is an incredible feat of small-screen magic." Metacritic gave the series a weighted average score of 91 out of 100 based on 26 reviews, indicating "universal acclaim".

The performance of the cast received widespread acclaim. Olly Alexander's performance received a positive review from Josh Smith from Glamour, who branded him the "heart of the show". In another review, Suzy Feay of the Financial Times explained how "frivolous, bitchy Ritchie could easily be played as caricature, but Olly Alexander gives him a magnetic charm". Keeley Hawes' performance in the final episode received praise from critics and viewers. Lucy Devine from Tyla.com described her performance as "outstanding and magnificent". Joel Leaver of the Daily Post branded her scenes as a "masterclass performance". Similarly, Flora Carr from Radio Times described her performance as "stunning" and "heartbreaking", noting that some critics originally expressed confusion over Hawes' casting in the small role of Valerie, "a dowdy, cardigan-wearing Isle of Wight resident". Carr added that Hawes' performance in episode five quashed any confusion as she "turned in an acting tour de force as a mother whose grief and denial turns her vicious". Critics and viewers expressed their desire for Alexander and Hawes to win BAFTAs for their performances.

In January 2021, Scarlett Russell from The Times branded it "the most talked-about show of the moment". Lucy Mangan from The Guardian praised the series, naming it a "poignant masterpiece". Of the character development she said "(Davies creates) real, flawed, entirely credible bundles of humanity and make it clear, without even momentary preachiness, how much they have to lose." Mangan drew comparisons to the COVID-19 pandemic, expanding that in its wake she felt that people could "empathise that bit more with the fear, uncertainty and responses rational and irrational to the emergence of a new disease." She concluded that any suggestions the series does not take its subject matter seriously enough are "nonsense". Adrian Lobb from The Big Issue praised the series for its characters. He stated "the journeys the characters in It's A Sin embark on over the decade the drama spans are truly profound." He noted the way the characters deal with HIV take viewers to the "outer reaches of the emotional galaxy."

A review of the first episode in the Radio Times was also broadly positive, summarising that "Russell T. Davies portrays London's early 1980s gay scene as giddily optimistic – but foreshadows the AIDS crisis to come." Davies' writing received acclaim, with Den of Geek opining that the series was a "soaring tribute" and a "must-watch", declaring it "Davies’ best yet; a joyful tribute to lost lives that delivers a seething verdict on ignorance and cruelty". Similarly, Guy Pewsy of Grazia described the show as "beautifully written and impeccably acted" and named it "one of the most beautiful explorations of gay life that I have ever seen". Nick Levine writing for NME opined that It's a Sin gradually develops "a thick veil of poignancy." They described the characters as "warm, flawed and sometimes frustrating". James Delingpole from The Spectator branded Davies' casting of mainly gay actors "blatant hypocrisy" but thought the show was "hugely entertaining". Elton John praised the show as a "triumph of creativity and humanity", adding that it was a "moving testament to a pivotal and important moment in LGBTQ history. The cast are sublime." Ian McKellen also praised the series and called Davies "the most imaginative of writers for television".

The Los Angeles Times gave a mixed review about the series, noting that while it claimed to be the first AIDS-related drama on British television, it actually wasn't.

This selective history is only compounded by the series’ positioning as the first to tell the story of AIDS on British TV, when in truth experimental films about AIDS appeared on television there throughout the first decade of the epidemic, notably on Channel 4 itself. The network was established in 1982 with a remit to “appeal to tastes and interests not generally catered for” by existing British broadcasters, and the wide range of queer work it commissioned included Derek Jarman's AIDS elegy Blue (1993) and Stuart Marshall's AIDS activist films Bright Eyes and Over Our Dead Bodies. If Davies found time to resurrect the Tombstone ad and the 1980s version of Doctor Who, why couldn't any of It's a Sin's lead quintet have been seen watching the British gay anthology series Out on Tuesday?

It's a Sin's soundtrack includes numerous artists from the 1980s including Pet Shop Boys, Kate Bush, Kelly Marie, Blondie, Erasure and Culture Club. El Hunt from music magazine NME noted that the series uses "a faultless selection of queer anthems and 80s smash hits that take on a new resonance." Annabel Nugent from The Independent praised the soundtrack stating "it manages to produce a feeling more substantial than that generic, cookie cutter kind of nostalgia."

=== Awards and nominations ===
Year	Award	Category	Nominee	Result	Ref.
2021	Banff Rockie Awards	Program of the Year	It's a Sin	Won	
2021	British LGBT Awards	Media Moment	Russell T Davies' It's a Sin	Won	
2021	British Society of Cinematographers Awards	Best Cinematography in a Television Drama	David Katznelson (for "Episode 1")	Nominated	
2021	Monte-Carlo Television Festival	Best Series	It's a Sin	Won	
2021	Monte-Carlo Television Festival	Best Actress	Lydia West	Won	
2021	TV Choice Awards	Best New Drama	It's a Sin	Nominated	
2021	TV Choice Awards	Best Actor	Olly Alexander	Nominated	
2021	National Television Awards	New Drama	It's a Sin	Won	
2021	National Television Awards	Drama Performance	Olly Alexander	Nominated	
2021	RTS Craft & Design Awards	Director - Drama	Peter Hoar	Nominated	
2021	RTS Craft & Design Awards	Editing - Drama	Sarah Brewerton	Won	
2021	RTS Craft & Design Awards	Production Design	Luana Hanson	Won	
2021	TCA Awards	Outstanding Achievement in Movies, Miniseries and Specials	It's a Sin	Nominated	
2021	Venice TV Awards	Best Series	It's a Sin	Won	
2021	Seoul International Drama Awards	Best Screenwriter	Russell T Davies	Won	
2021	Edinburgh International Television Festival	Best Drama	It's a Sin	Won	
2021	Edinburgh International Television Festival	Best TV Actor – Drama	Keeley Hawes	Nominated	
2021	BAFTA Cymru	Writer	Russell T Davies	Won	
2021	BAFTA Cymru	Actor	Callum Scott Howells	Won	
2021	BAFTA Cymru	Actress	Andria Doherty	Nominated	
2021	Gotham Awards	Breakthrough Series – Long Form	It's a Sin	Nominated	
2021	Rose d'Or	Drama	It's a Sin	Nominated	
2022	Writers' Guild of Great Britain	Best Long Form TV Drama	It's a Sin	Won	
2022	Critics' Choice Awards	Best Limited Series	It's a Sin	Nominated	
2022	Critics' Choice Awards	Best Actor in a Limited Series	Olly Alexander	Nominated	
2022	Independent Spirit Awards	Best New Scripted Series	It's a Sin	Nominated	
2022	Independent Spirit Awards	Best Male Performance in a New Scripted Series	Olly Alexander	Nominated	
2022	BPG Awards	Best Drama Series	It's a Sin	Won	
2022	BPG Awards	Best Writer	Russell T Davies	Won	
2022	BPG Awards	Best Actor	Olly Alexander	Nominated	
2022	BPG Awards	Best Actor	Callum Scott Howells	Nominated	
2022	BPG Awards	Best Actress	Lydia West	Nominated	
2022	BPG Awards	Breakthrough Award	Olly Alexander, Omari Douglas, Callum Scott Howells, Lydia West, Nathaniel Curtis	Nominated	
2022	RTS Programme Awards	Limited Series	It's a Sin	Won	
2022	RTS Programme Awards	Writer – Drama	Russell T Davies	Won	
2022	RTS Programme Awards	Actor (Female)	Keeley Hawes	Nominated	
2022	RTS Programme Awards	Actor (Male)	Olly Alexander	Nominated	
2022	RTS Programme Awards	Actor (Male)	Callum Scott Howells	Won	
2022	RTS Programme Awards	Breakthrough Award	Callum Scott Howells	Nominated	
2022	Satellite Awards	Best Miniseries	It's a Sin	Nominated	
2022	GLAAD Media Awards	Outstanding TV Movie or Limited Series	It's a Sin	Won	
2022	British Academy Television Awards	Best Mini-Series	It's a Sin	Nominated	
2022	British Academy Television Awards	Best Actor	Olly Alexander	Nominated	
2022	British Academy Television Awards	Best Actress	Lydia West	Nominated	
2022	British Academy Television Awards	Best Supporting Actor	David Carlyle	Nominated	
2022	British Academy Television Awards	Best Supporting Actor	Omari Douglas	Nominated	
2022	British Academy Television Awards	Best Supporting Actor	Callum Scott Howells	Nominated	
2022	British Academy Television Awards	Must-See Moment	Colin's devastating AIDS diagnosis	Nominated	
2022	British Academy Television Craft Awards	Best Director: Fiction	Peter Hoar	Won	
2022	British Academy Television Craft Awards	Best Writer: Drama	Russell T Davies	Nominated	
2022	British Academy Television Craft Awards	Best Editing: Fiction	Sarah Brewerton	Nominated	
2022	British Academy Television Craft Awards	Best Scripted Casting	Andy Pryor	Nominated	
2022	British Academy Television Craft Awards	Best Make-Up & Hair Design	Lin Davie and Laura Flynn	Nominated	

== Stage adaptation ==
In March 2026, Rambert Dance Company announced it was to stage a contemporary dance adaptation of the series, to premiere at Aviva Studios in Manchester. Davies, who will serve as executive producer of the new adaptation, had previously turned down the suggestion of adapting the series for musical theatre.
