= British Academy Television Award for Best Supporting Actor =

Annual award for performance in television

British Academy Television Award
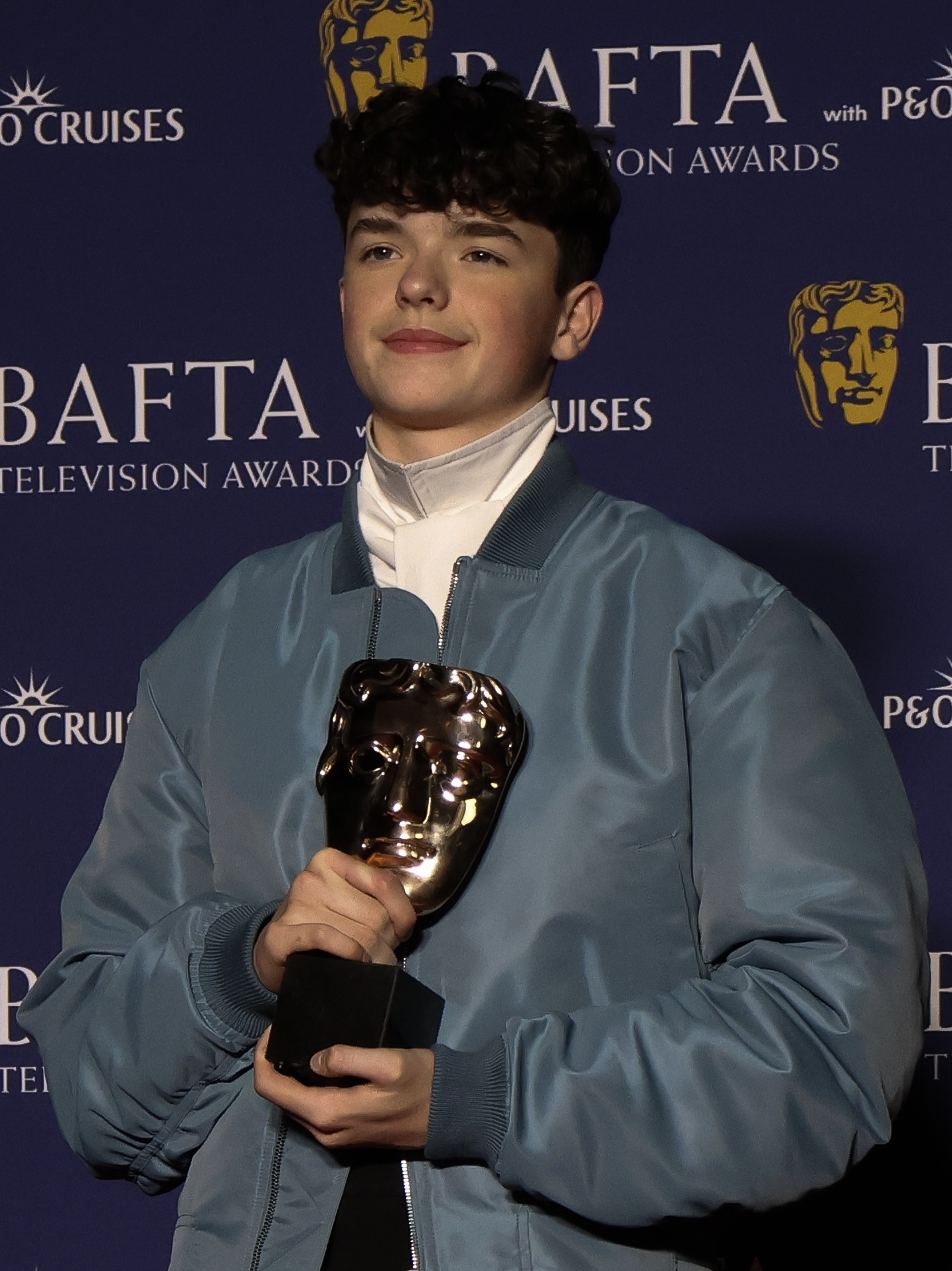
- 2026 winner: Owen Cooper
- Country: United Kingdom
- Presented by: British Academy of Film and Television Arts
- First award: 2010
- Currently held by: Owen Cooper for Adolescence (2026)

Highlights
- Most wins: Matthew Macfadyen (3)
- Website: www.bafta.org

This is a list of the British Academy Television Award for Best Supporting Actor, presented by the British Academy of Film and Television Arts (BAFTA).

The awards, informally known as the BAFTA TV Awards, have been awarded since 1954. From 1968–1997, the BAFTA TV Awards and the BAFTA Film Awards were presented in one joint ceremony. Since 1998, there have been two separate ceremonies. The film awards are held in February, usually two weeks ahead of the Academy Awards (Oscars) in the United States, while the TV awards are held in late May. The BAFTA TV Awards are also the UK equivalent to the Emmy Awards in the US.

The awards for Best Supporting Actor and Best Supporting Actress were first presented at the 2010 ceremony.

== Winners and nominees ==
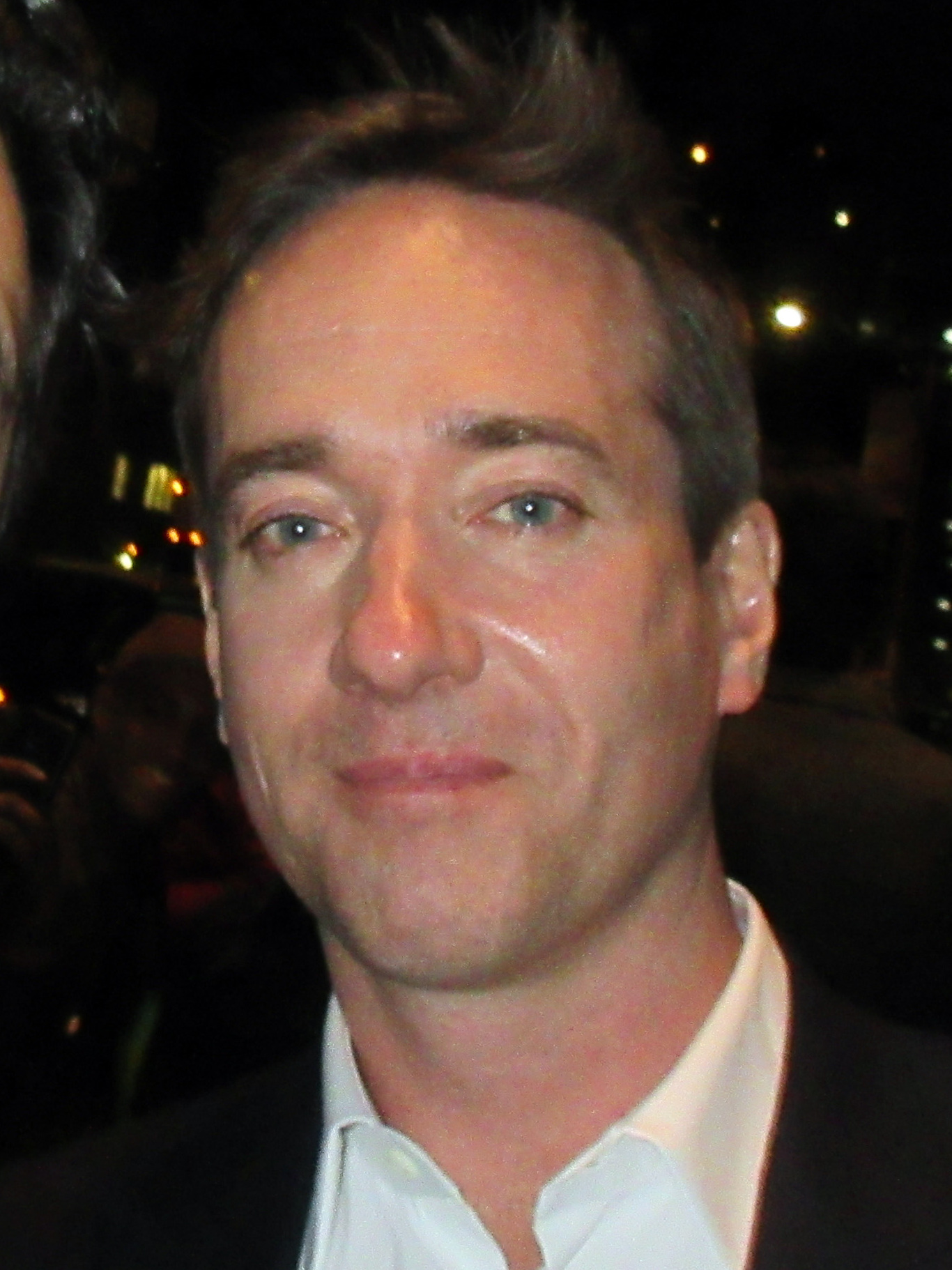
Matthew Macfadyen was the first recipient of the award in 2010 for Criminal Justice. He also won in 2022 and 2024 for Succession.

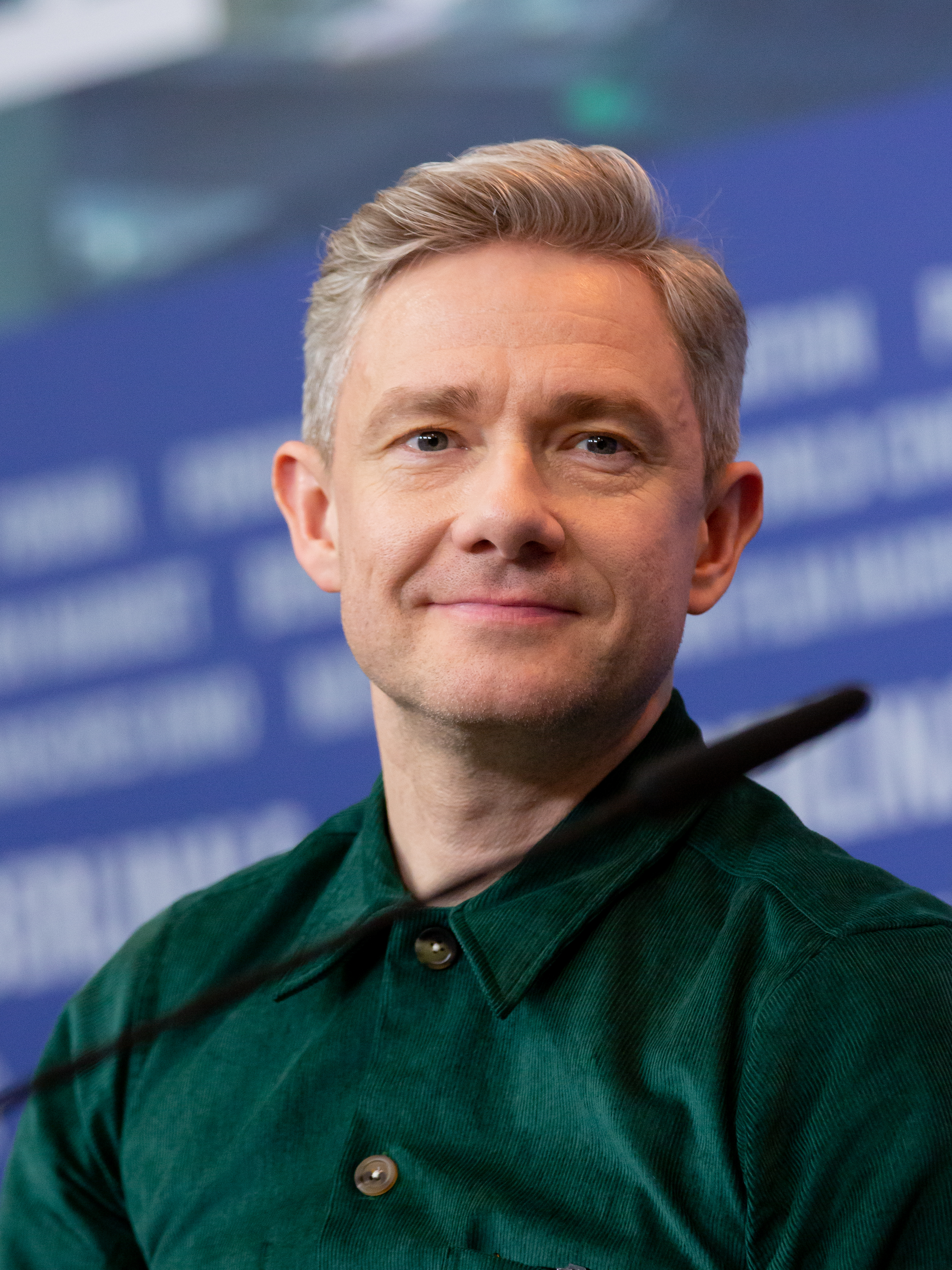
Martin Freeman won for Sherlock in 2011. He also won a Primetime Emmy Award for the series.

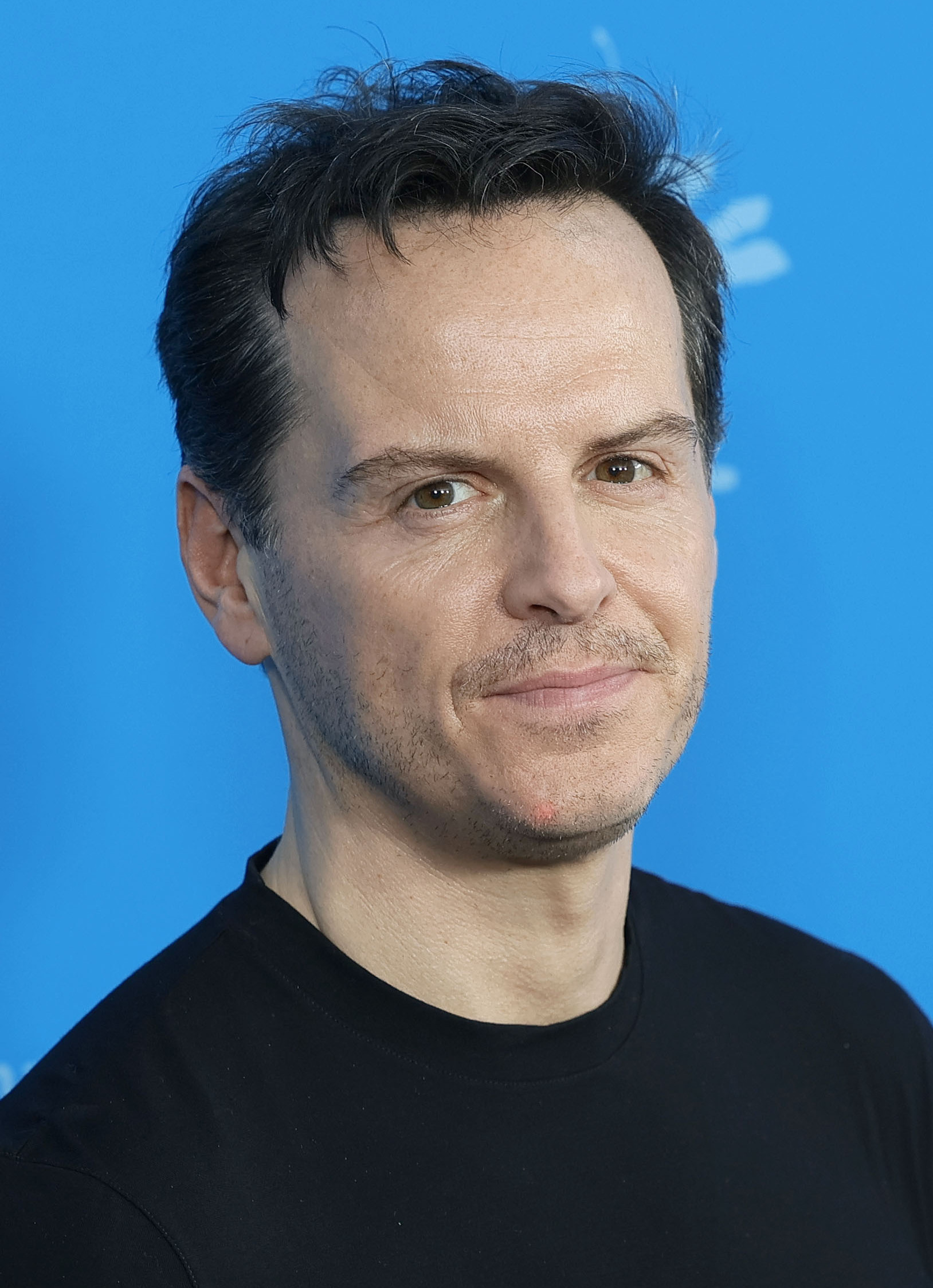
Andrew Scott won for Sherlock in 2012

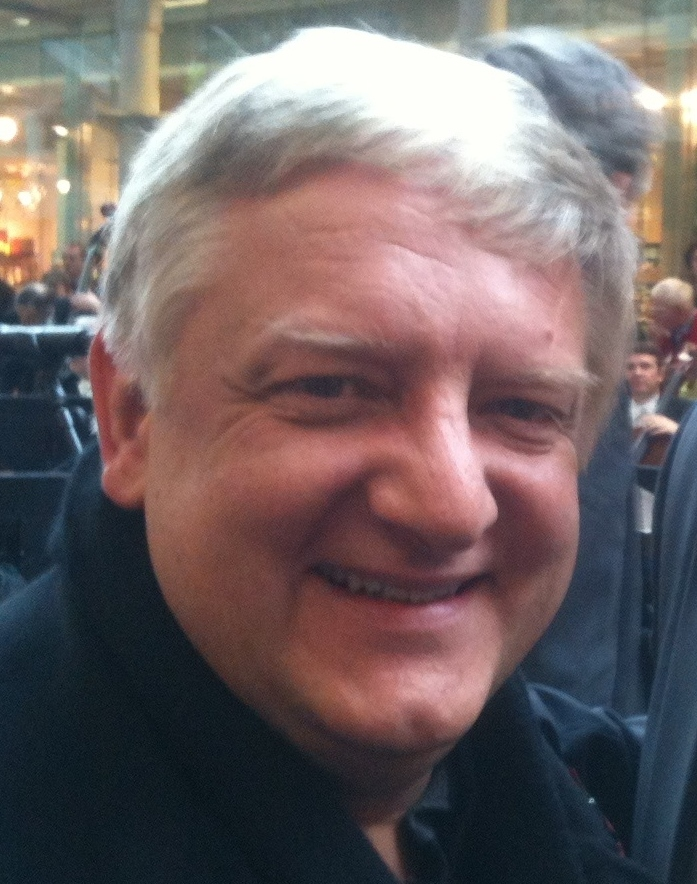
Simon Russell Beale won for Henry IV, Parts I & II: The Hollow Crown in 2013

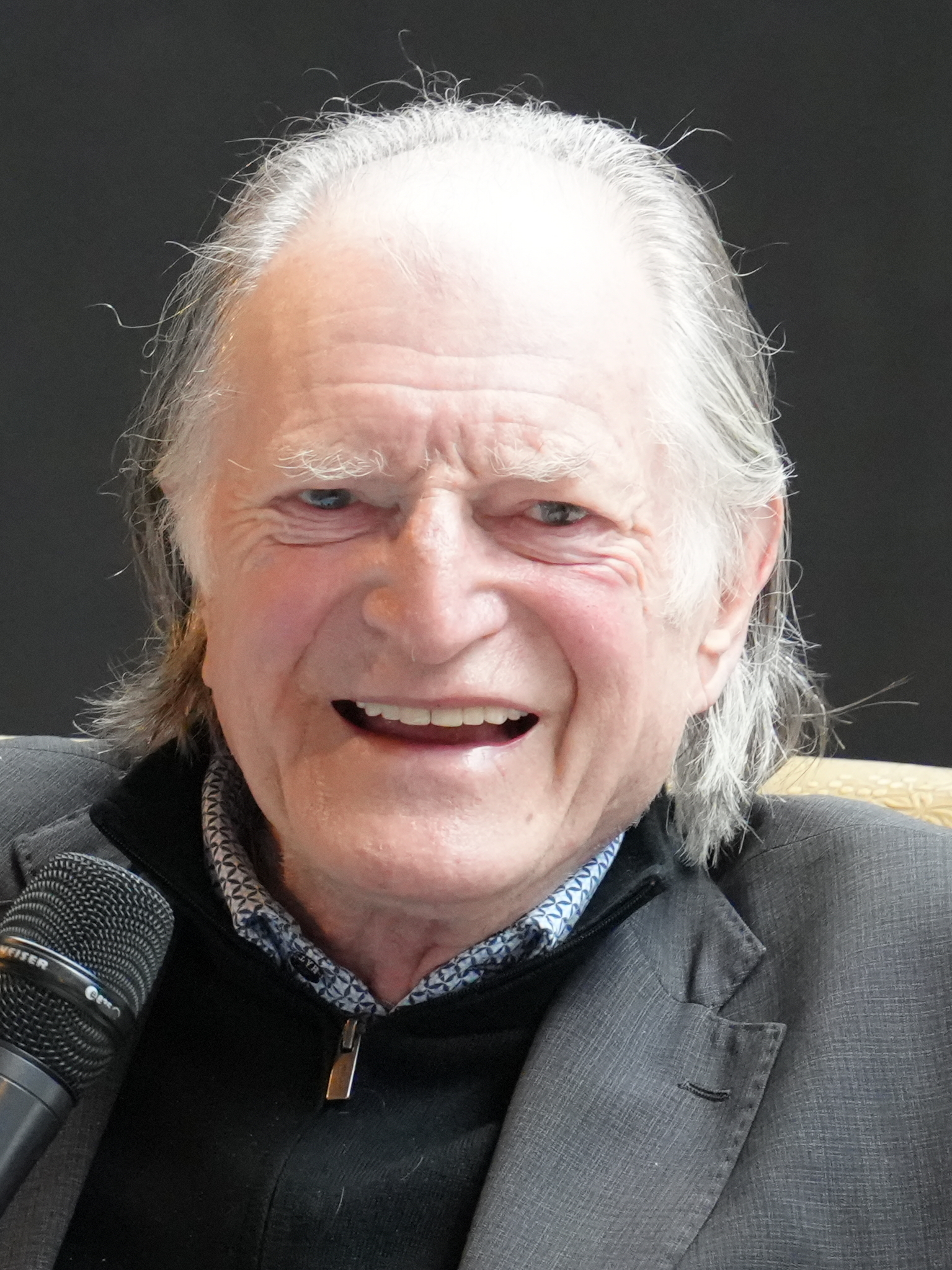
David Bradley won for Broadchurch in 2014

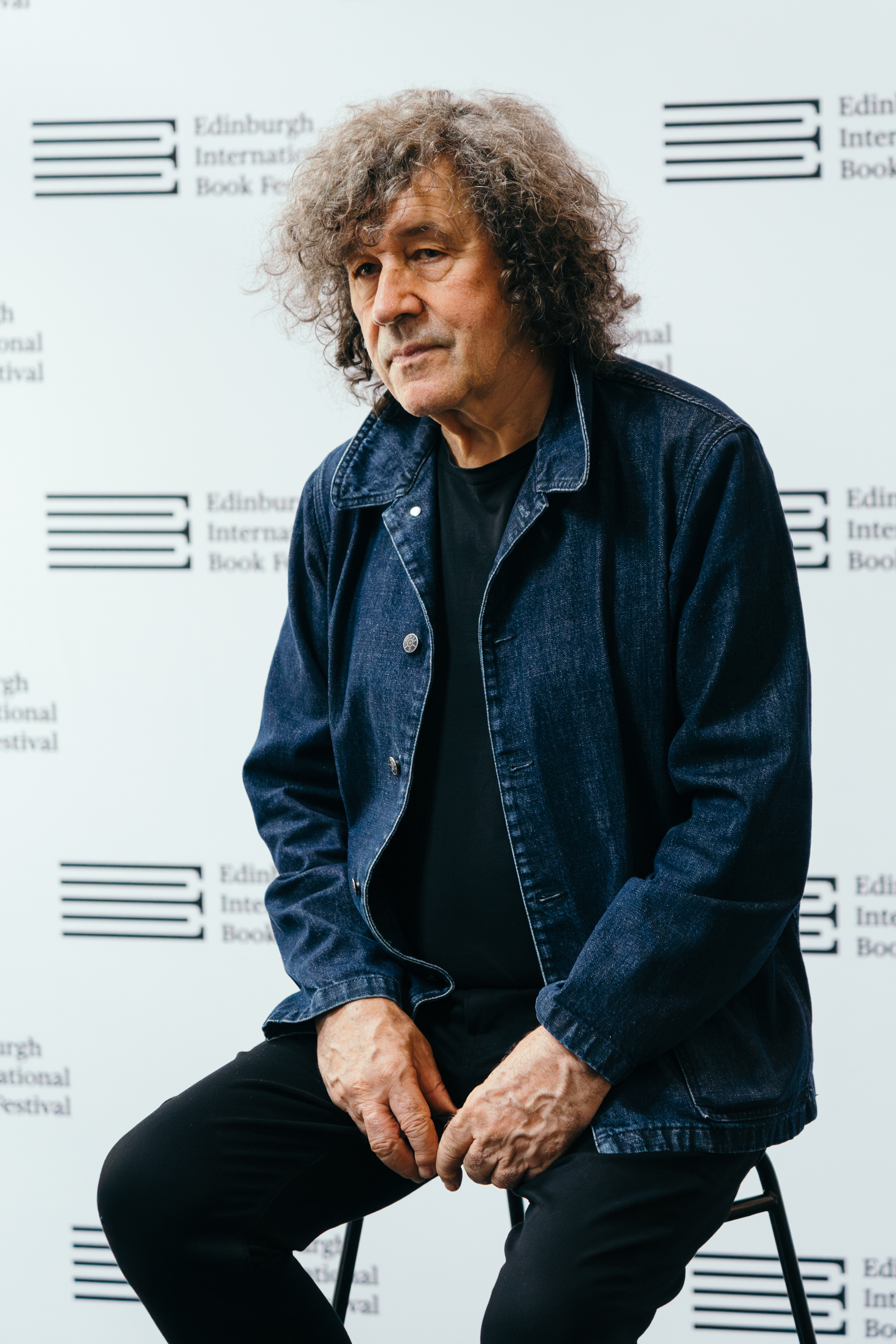
Stephen Rea won for The Honourable Woman in 2015

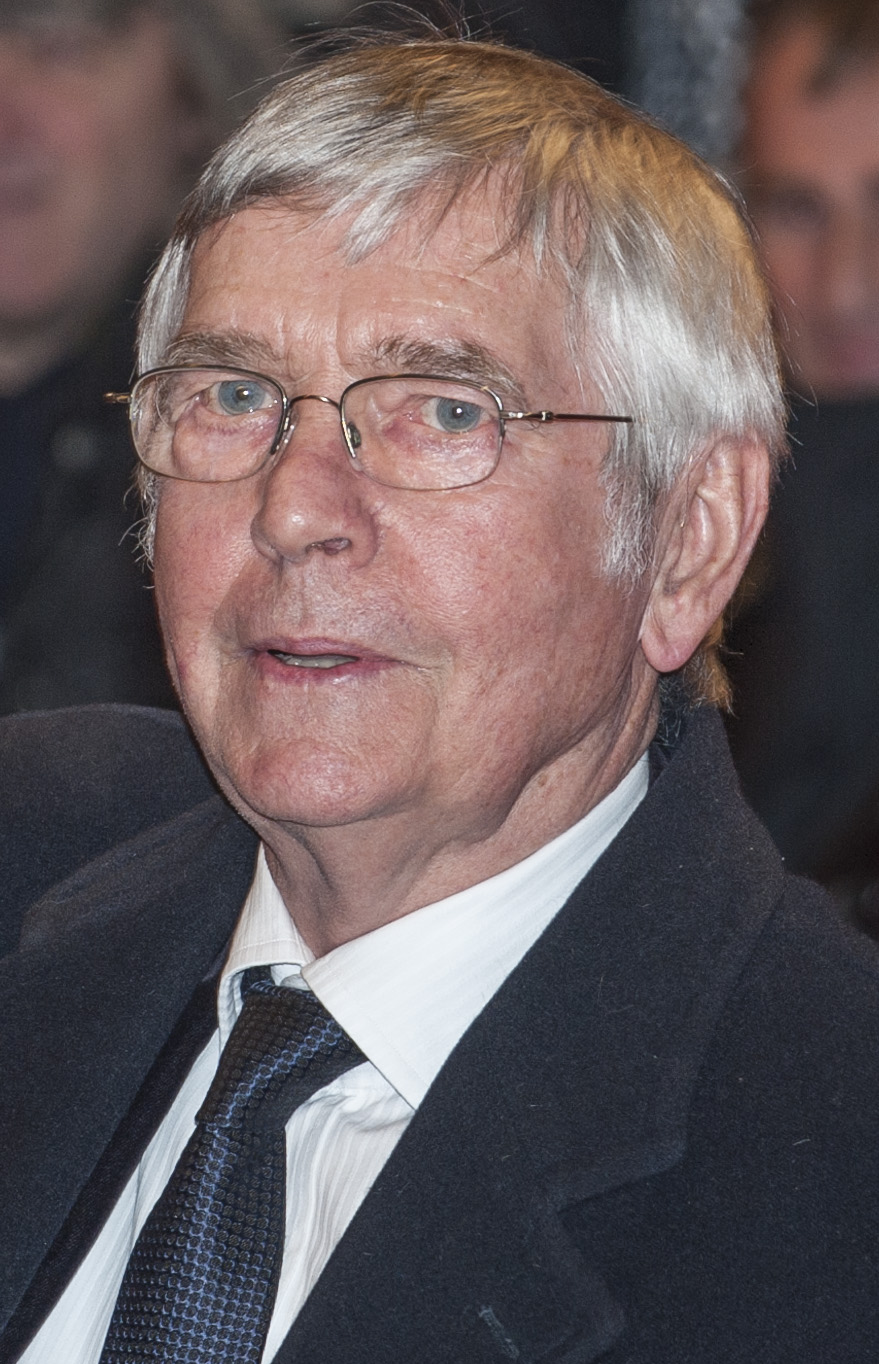
Tom Courtenay won for Unforgotten in 2016

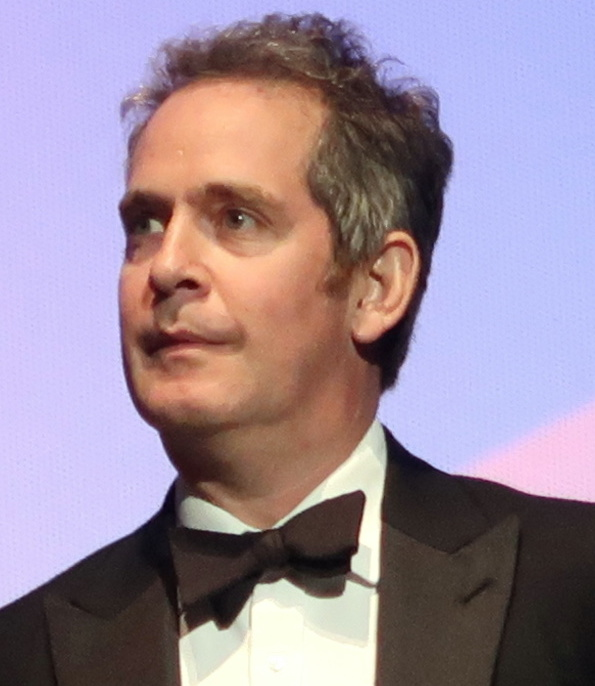
Tom Hollander won for The Night Manager in 2017

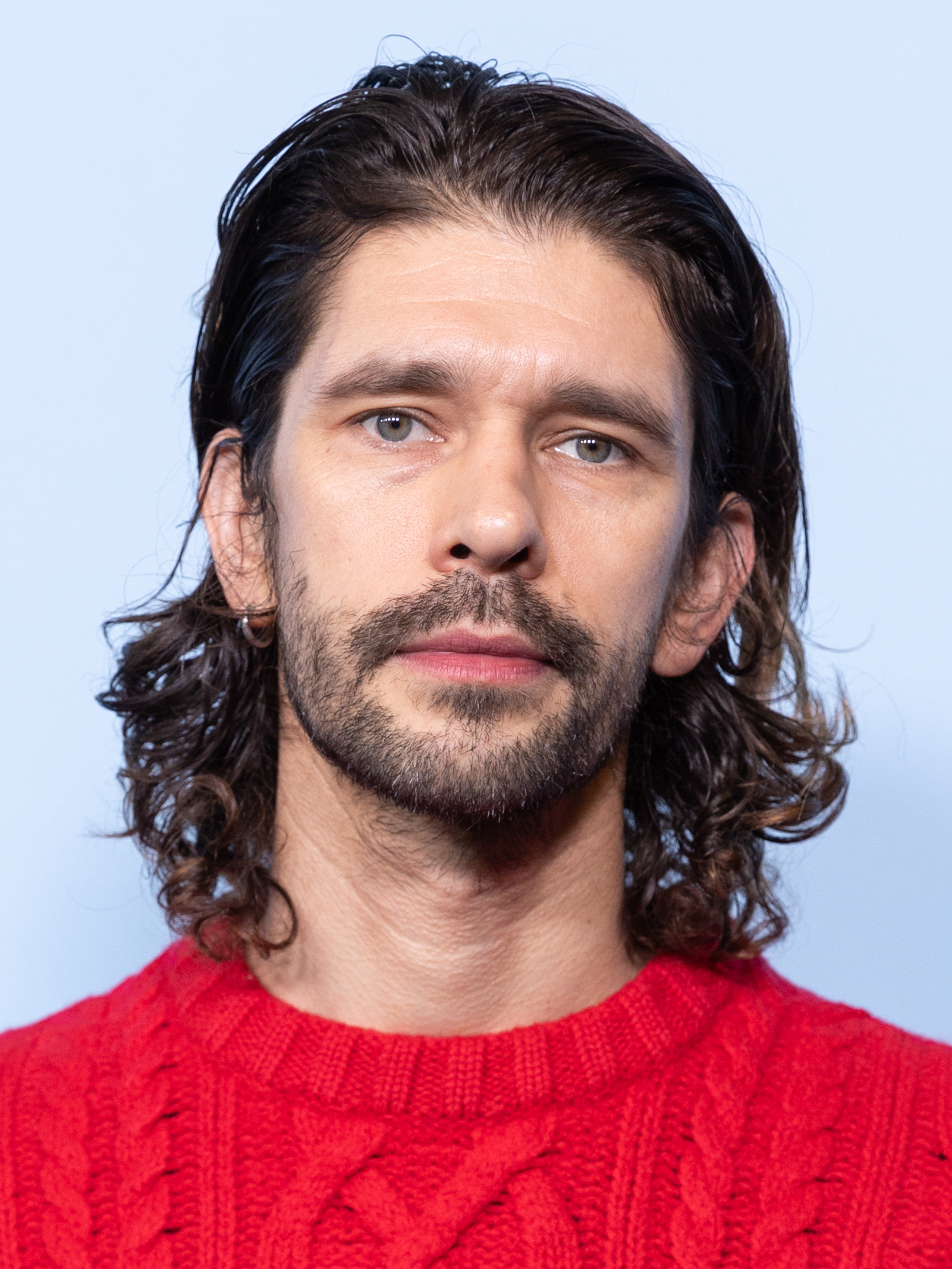
Ben Whishaw won for A Very English Scandal in 2019. He also won a Primetime Emmy Award for the series.

Will Sharpe won for Giri/Haji in 2020

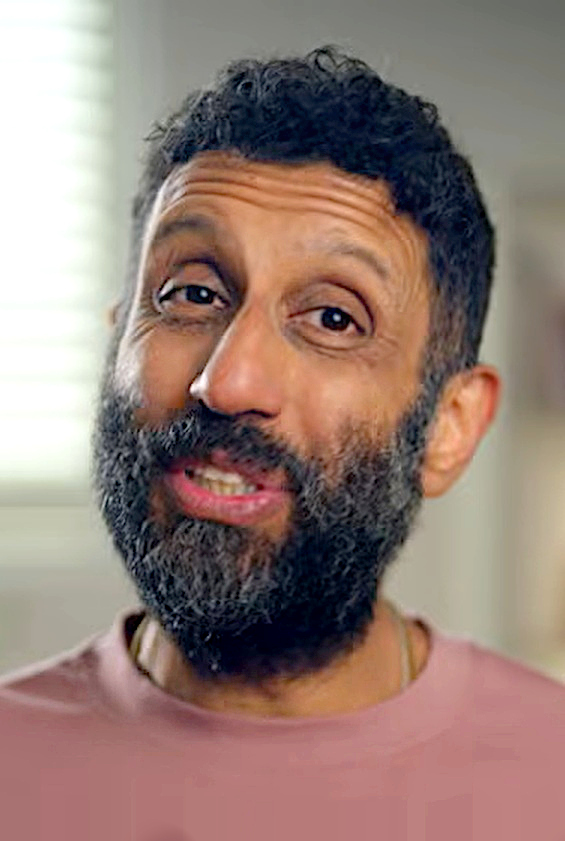
Adeel Akhtar won for Sherwood in 2023

=== 2010s ===
Year	Actors	Work	Character	Network
2010 (56th)
2010 (56th)	Matthew Macfadyen	Criminal Justice	Joe Miller	BBC One
2010 (56th)	Tom Hollander	Gracie!	Monty Banks	BBC Four
2010 (56th)	Benedict Cumberbatch	Small Island	Bernard Bligh	BBC One
2010 (56th)	Gary Lewis	Mo	Adam Ingram	Channel 4
2011 (57th)
2011 (57th)	Martin Freeman	Sherlock	Dr. John Watson	BBC One
2011 (57th)	Brendan Coyle	Downton Abbey	John Bates	ITV
2011 (57th)	Johnny Harris	This Is England '86	Michael "Mick" Jenkins	Channel 4
2011 (57th)	Robert Sheehan	Misfits	Nathan Young	E4
2012 (58th)
2012 (58th)	Andrew Scott	Sherlock	Jim Moriarty	BBC One
2012 (58th)	Stephen Rea	The Shadow Line	Gatehouse	BBC Two
2012 (58th)	Martin Freeman	Sherlock	Dr. John Watson	BBC One
2012 (58th)	Joseph Mawle	Birdsong	Jack Firebrace	BBC One
2013 (59th)
2013 (59th)	Simon Russell Beale	"Henry IV, Parts I & II": The Hollow Crown	Falstaff	BBC Two
2013 (59th)	Harry Lloyd	The Fear	Matty Beckett	Channel 4
2013 (59th)	Stephen Graham	Accused	Tony	BBC One
2013 (59th)	Peter Capaldi	The Hour	Randall Brown	BBC Two
2014 (60th)
2014 (60th)	David Bradley	Broadchurch	Jack Marshall	ITV
2014 (60th)	Jerome Flynn	Ripper Street	Detective Sergeant Bennet Drake	BBC One
2014 (60th)	Nico Mirallegro	The Village	Joe Middleton	BBC One
2014 (60th)	Rory Kinnear	Southcliffe	David Whitehead	Channel 4
2015 (61st)
2015 (61st)	Stephen Rea	The Honourable Woman	Sir Hugh Hayden-Hoyle	BBC Two
2015 (61st)	Adeel Akhtar	Utopia	Wilson Wilson	Channel 4
2015 (61st)	James Norton	Happy Valley	Tommy Lee Royce	BBC One
2015 (61st)	Ken Stott	The Missing	Ian Garrett	BBC One
2016 (62nd)
2016 (62nd)	Tom Courtenay	Unforgotten	Eric Slater	ITV
2016 (62nd)	Ian McKellen	The Dresser	Norman	Channel 4
2016 (62nd)	Anton Lesser	Wolf Hall	Thomas More	BBC Two
2016 (62nd)	Cyril Nri	Cucumber	Lance Sullivan	BBC Two
2017 (63rd)
2017 (63rd)	Tom Hollander	The Night Manager	Major "Corky" Lance Corkoran	BBC One
2017 (63rd)	Daniel Mays	Line of Duty	Danny Waldron	BBC Two
2017 (63rd)	Jared Harris	The Crown	King George VI	Netflix
2017 (63rd)	John Lithgow	The Crown	Winston Churchill	Netflix
2018 (64th)
2018 (64th)	Brían F. O'Byrne	Little Boy Blue	Steve Jones	ITV
2018 (64th)	Adrian Dunbar	Line of Duty	Ted Hastings	BBC One
2018 (64th)	Anupam Kher	The Boy with the Topknot	Sathnam's Father	BBC Two
2018 (64th)	Jimmi Simpson	Black Mirror: USS Callister	James "Wally" Walton	Netflix
2019 (65th)
2019 (65th)	Ben Whishaw	A Very English Scandal	Norman Josiffe	BBC One
2019 (65th)	Alex Jennings	Unforgotten	Tim Finch	ITV
2019 (65th)	Kim Bodnia	Killing Eve	Konstantin Vasiliev	BBC One
2019 (65th)	Stephen Graham	Save Me	Fabio "Melon" Melonzola	Sky Atlantic

=== 2020s ===
Year	Actors	Work	Character	Network(s)
2020 (66th)
2020 (66th)	Will Sharpe	Giri/Haji	Rodney Yamaguchi	BBC Two
2020 (66th)	Joe Absolom	A Confession	Christopher Halliwell	ITV
2020 (66th)	Josh O'Connor	The Crown	Charles, Prince of Wales	Netflix
2020 (66th)	Stellan Skarsgård	Chernobyl	Boris Shcherbina	HBO / Sky Atlantic
2021 (67th)	Malachi Kirby	Small Axe: Mangrove	Darcus Howe	BBC One
2021 (67th)	Kunal Nayyar	Criminal: UK	Sandeep Singh	Netflix
2021 (67th)	Tobias Menzies	The Crown	Prince Philip, Duke of Edinburgh	Netflix
2021 (67th)	Michael Sheen	Quiz	Chris Tarrant	ITV
2021 (67th)	Rupert Everett	Adult Material	Carroll Quinn	Channel 4
2021 (67th)	Micheal Ward	Small Axe: Lovers Rock	Franklyn Cooper	BBC One
2022 (68th)	Matthew Macfadyen	Succession	Tom Wambsgans	HBO / Sky Atlantic
2022 (68th)	Callum Scott Howells	It's a Sin	Colin "Gladys Pugh" Morris-Jones	Channel 4
2022 (68th)	Omari Douglas	It's a Sin	Roscoe Babatunde	Channel 4
2022 (68th)	David Carlyle	It's a Sin	Gregory "Gloria" Finch	Channel 4
2022 (68th)	Nonso Anozie	Sweet Tooth	Tommy Jepperd	Netflix
2022 (68th)	Stephen Graham	Time	Eric McNally	BBC One
2023 (69th)	Adeel Akhtar	Sherwood	Andy Fisher	BBC One
2023 (69th)	Samuel Bottomley	Somewhere Boy	Aaron	Channel 4
2023 (69th)	Josh Finan	The Responder	Marco	BBC One
2023 (69th)	Salim Daw	The Crown	Mohamed Al-Fayed	Netflix
2023 (69th)	Jack Lowden	Slow Horses	River Cartwright	Apple TV+
2023 (69th)	Will Sharpe	The White Lotus	Ethan Spiller	Sky Atlantic
2024 (70th)	Matthew Macfadyen	Succession	Tom Wambsgans	HBO / Sky Atlantic
2024 (70th)	Amit Shah	Happy Valley	Faisal Bhatti	BBC One
2024 (70th)	Éanna Hardwicke	The Sixth Commandment	Ben L. Field	BBC One
2024 (70th)	Harris Dickinson	A Murder at the End of the World	William "Bill" Farrah	Disney+
2024 (70th)	Jack Lowden	Slow Horses	River Cartwright	Apple TV+
2024 (70th)	Salim Daw	The Crown	Mohamed Al-Fayed	Netflix
2025 (71st)
2025 (71st)	Ariyon Bakare	Mr Loverman	Morris De La Roux	BBC One
2025 (71st)	Damian Lewis	Wolf Hall: The Mirror and the Light	Henry VIII	BBC One
2025 (71st)	Christopher Chung	Slow Horses	Roddy Ho	Apple TV+
2025 (71st)	Jonathan Pryce	Slow Horses	David Cartwright	Apple TV+
2025 (71st)	McKinley Belcher III	Eric	Michael Ledroit	Netflix
2025 (71st)	Sonny Walker	The Gathering	Adam	Channel 4
2026 (72nd)
2026 (72nd)	Owen Cooper	Adolescence	Jamie Miller	Netflix
2026 (72nd)	Fehinti Balogun	Down Cemetery Road	Amos Crane	Apple TV
2026 (72nd)	Paddy Considine	MobLand	Kevin Harrigan	Paramount+
2026 (72nd)	Rafael Mathé	The Death of Bunny Munro	Bunny Junior	Sky Atlantic
2026 (72nd)	Joshua McGuire	The Gold	Douglas Baxter	BBC One
2026 (72nd)	Ashley Walters	Adolescence	DI Luke Bascombe	Netflix

== Superlatives ==
Record	Actor	Programme	Age (in years)
Oldest winner	Tom Courtenay	Unforgotten	79
Oldest nominee	Tom Courtenay	Unforgotten	79
Youngest winner	Owen Cooper	Adolescence	16
Youngest nominee	Owen Cooper	Adolescence	16

== Actors with multiple wins and nominations ==
=== Multiple wins ===
The following people have won the British Academy Television Award for Best Supporting Actor multiple times:

3 wins

- Matthew Macfadyen

=== Multiple nominations ===
The following people have been nominated for the British Academy Television Award for Best Supporting Actor multiple times:

3 nominations

- Stephen Graham
- Matthew Macfadyen

2 nominations

- Adeel Akhtar
- Salim Daw
- Martin Freeman
- Tom Hollander
- Jack Lowden
- Stephen Rea
- Will Sharpe

== Programmes with multiple wins and nominations ==
=== Multiple wins ===
2 awards

- Sherlock
- Succession

=== Multiple nominations ===
6 nominations

- The Crown

3 nominations

- It's a Sin
- Sherlock

2 nominations

- Adolescence
- Happy Valley
- Line of Duty
- Slow Horses
- Succession
- Unforgotten
