= 2022 British Academy Television Awards =

Awards recognising the excellence of British television in 2021

68th British Academy Television Awards
- Date: 8 May 2022
- Site: Royal Festival Hall
- Hosted by: Richard Ayoade

Highlights
- Best Comedy Series: Motherland
- Best Drama: In My Skin
- Most awards: Big Zuu's Big Eats / Help / Time (2)
- Most nominations: It's a Sin (7)

Television coverage
- Channel: BBC One

The 2022 British Academy Television Awards were held on 8 May 2022 at the Royal Festival Hall in London, to recognise the excellence in British television of 2021. The nominations were announced on 30 March 2022 alongside the nominations for the 2022 British Academy Television Craft Awards. The nominees for Must-See Moment, voted on by the public, were announced on 23 March 2022.

It was the first awards ceremony since the 2019 edition to be held with an in-person audience. Richard Ayoade returned as host for the third consecutive year.

It was also the first awards ceremony to be held in its usual May slot.

Though It's a Sin was nominated for the most awards, with seven, including three in the same category (Best Supporting Actor), it won none. Three series won multiple awards: Big Zuu's Big Eats, Help, and Time each won two. Including Craft Awards, Landscapers was also nominated for seven awards; it won three (all Craft).

== Rules changes ==
In October 2021, the British Academy of Film and Television Arts (BAFTA) announced several changes in its rules and voting system:

- Line Producers/Production Managers/Heads of Production are now eligible for nomination.
- UK performers appearing in the International category are now eligible for performance categories.
- For the International Programme category, the amount of nominees increased from four to six.
- International members can now vote across all applicable Television and Television Craft categories.

== Winners and nominees ==
The nominations were announced on 30 March 2022.

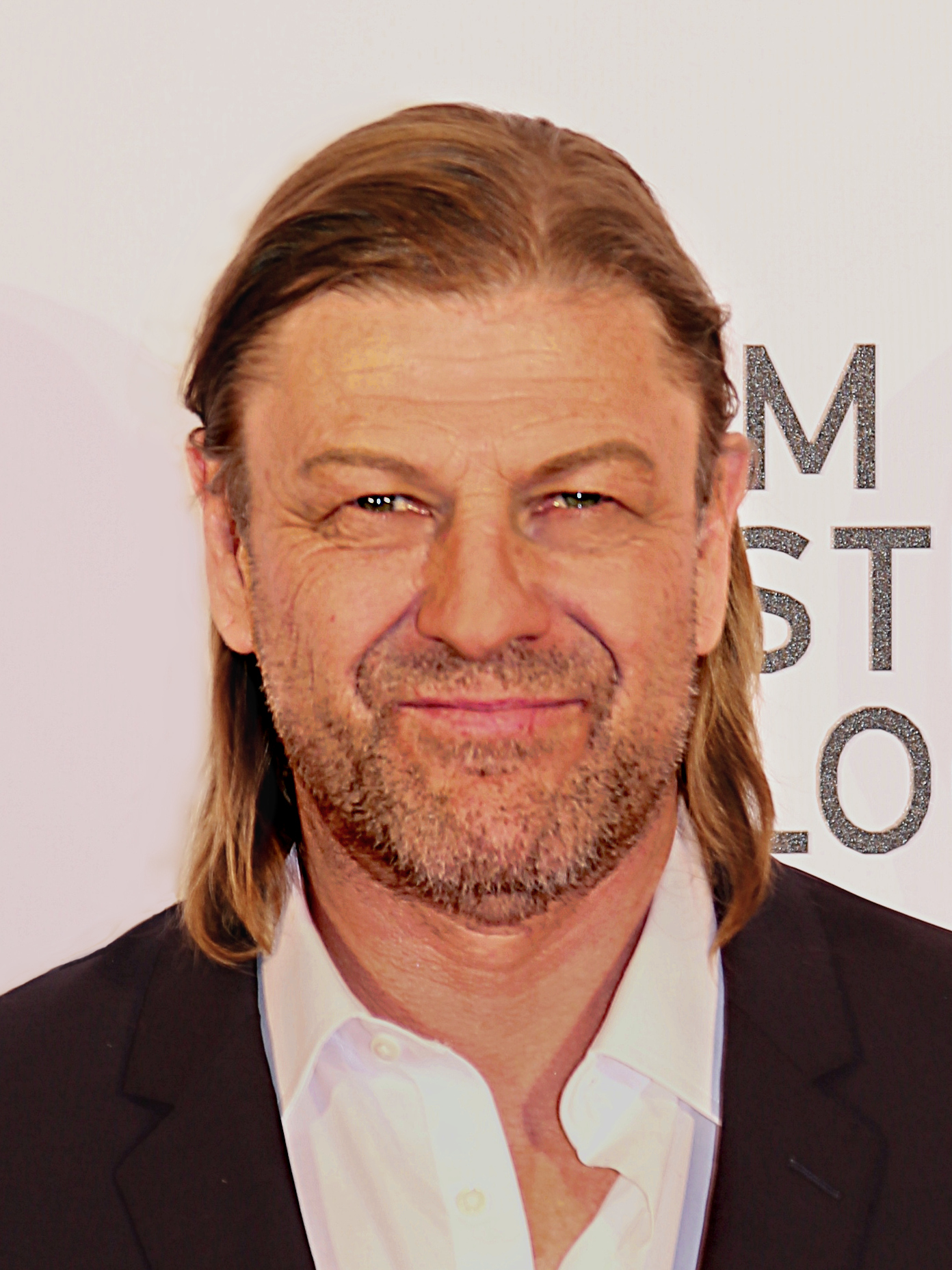
Sean Bean, Best Actor winner

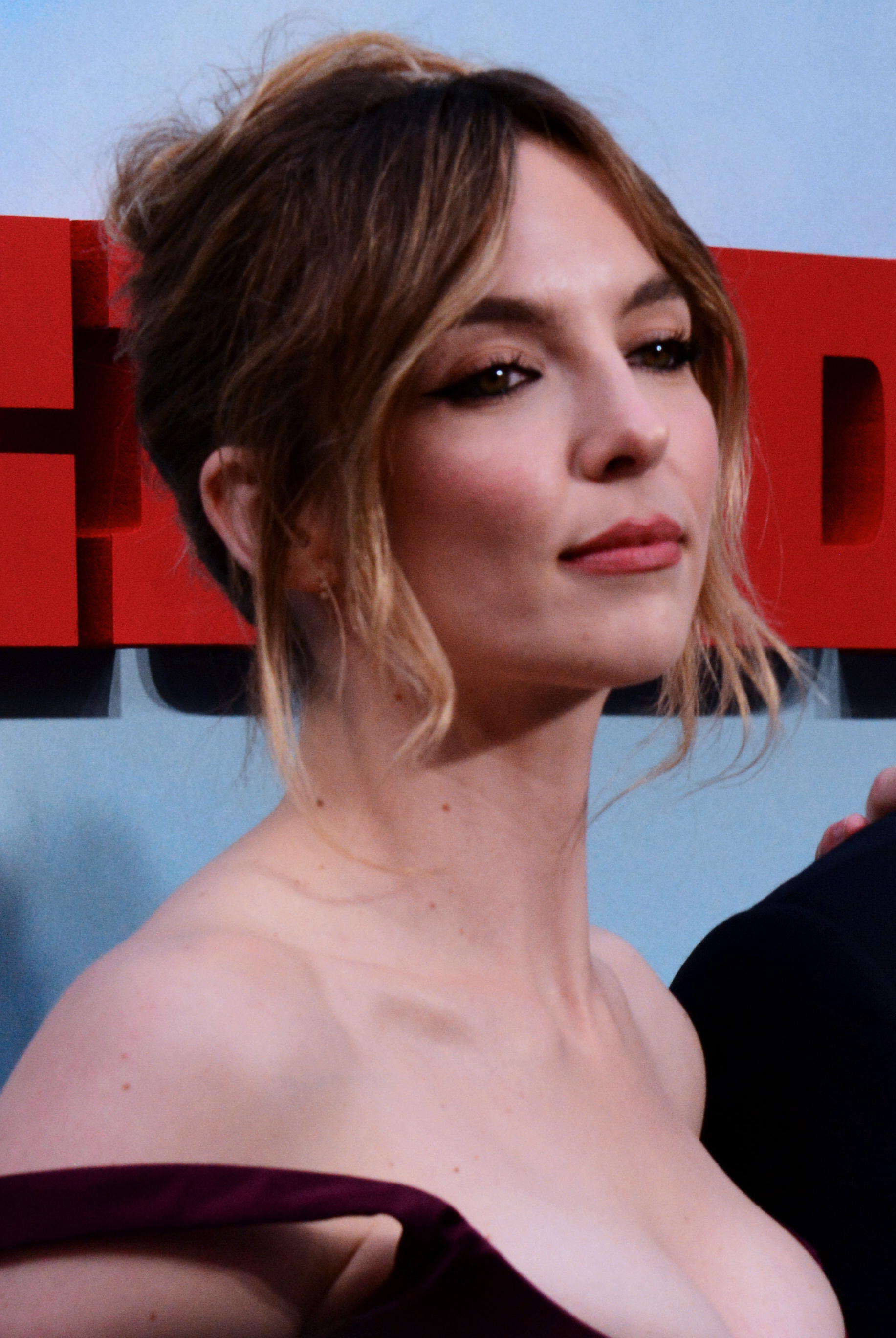
Jodie Comer, Best Actress winner

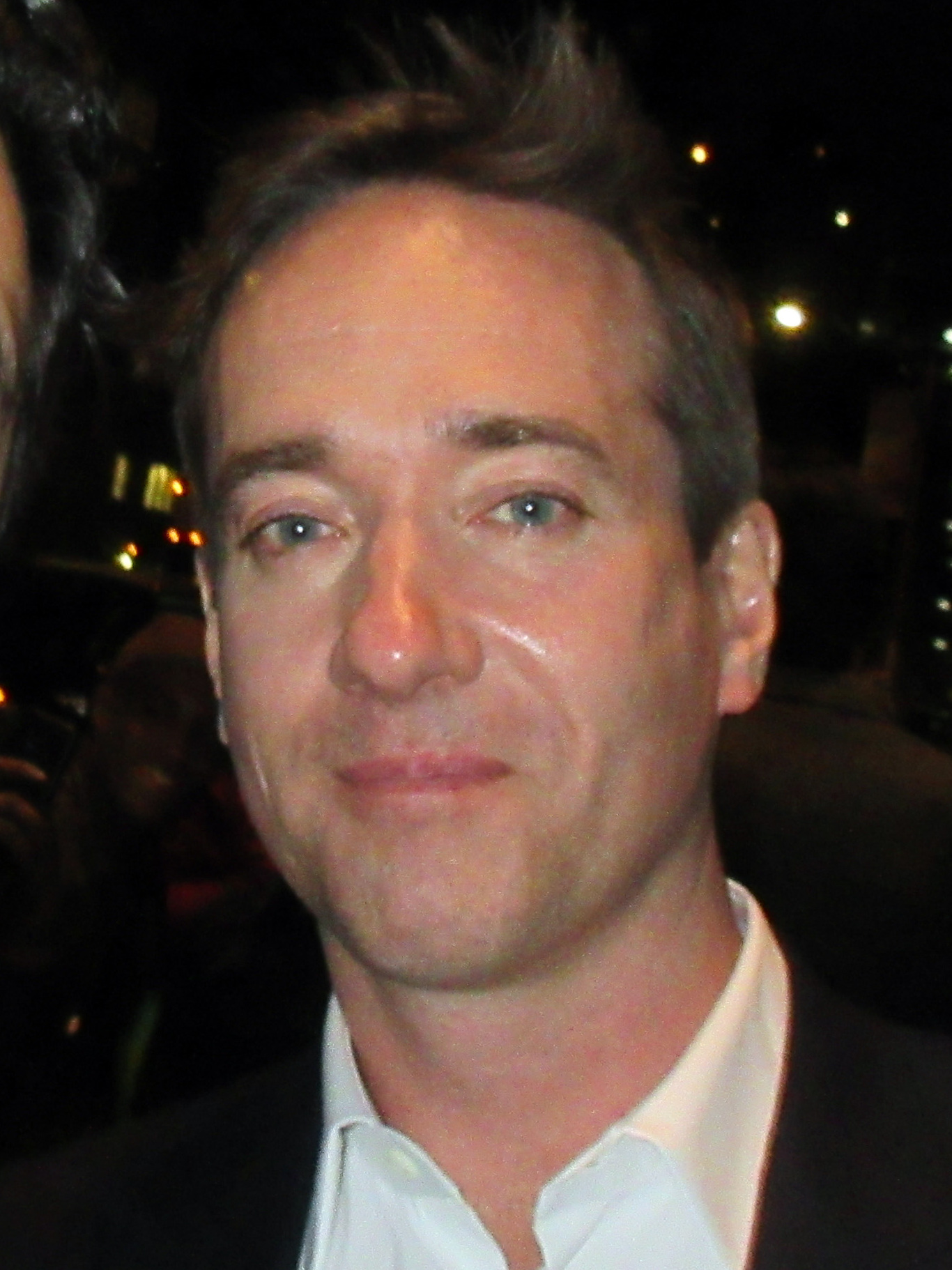
Matthew Macfadyen, Best Supporting Actor winner

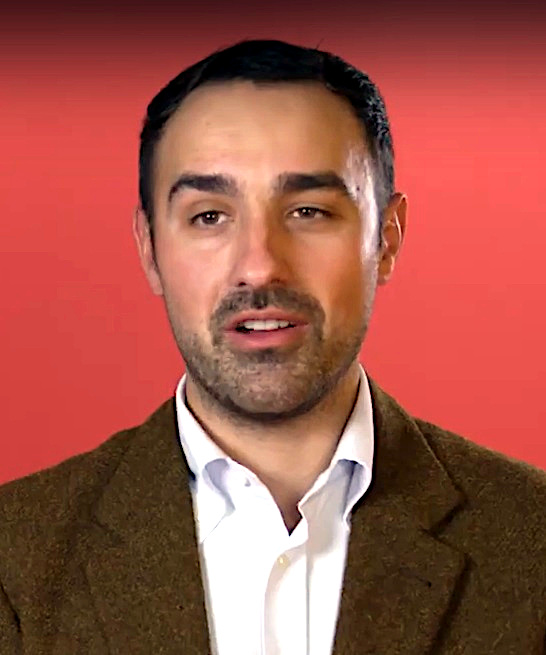
Jamie Demetriou, Best Male Comedy Performance winner

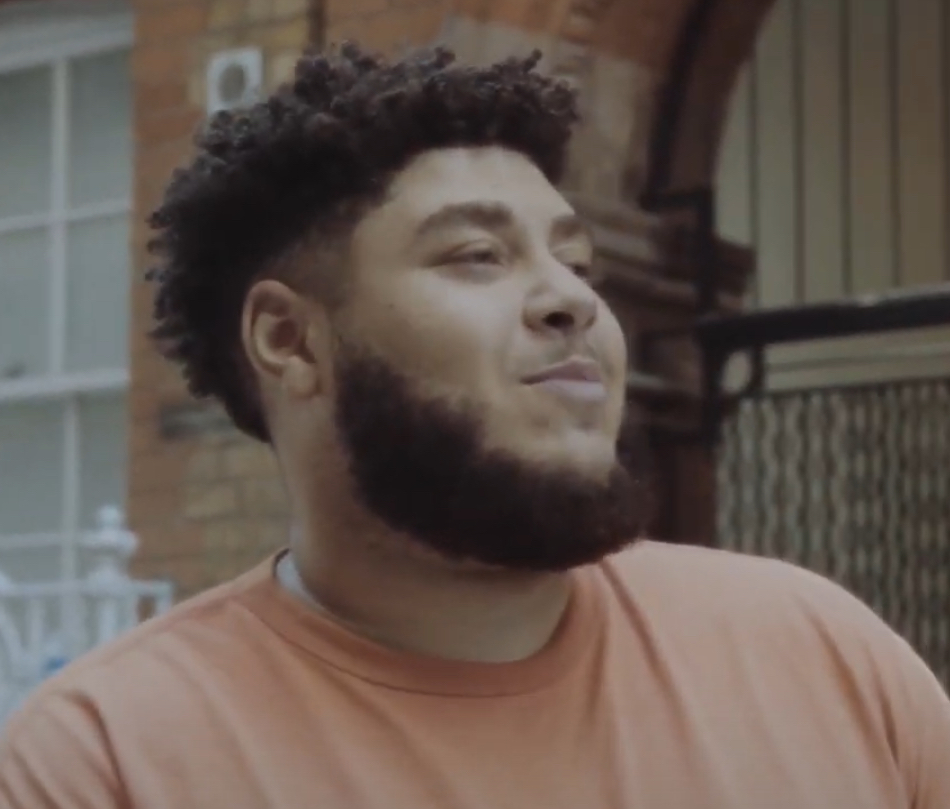
Big Zuu, Best Entertainment Performance winner

| Best Drama Series | Best Scripted Comedy |
|---|---|
| In My Skin (BBC Three); Manhunt: The Night Stalker (ITV); Unforgotten (ITV); Vigil (BBC One) | Motherland (BBC Two); Alma's Not Normal (BBC Two); Stath Lets Flats (Channel 4); We Are Lady Parts (Channel 4) |
| Best Single Drama | Best Mini-Series |
| Together (BBC Two); Death of England: Face to Face (Sky Arts); Help (Channel 4); I Am... Victoria (Channel 4) | Time (BBC One); It's a Sin (Channel 4); Landscapers (Sky Atlantic); Stephen (ITV) |
| Best Soap and Continuing Drama | Best Comedy Entertainment Programme |
| Coronation Street (ITV); Casualty (BBC One); Emmerdale (ITV); Holby City (BBC One) | The Lateish Show with Mo Gilligan (Channel 4); Race Around Britain (YouTube); The Graham Norton Show (BBC One); The Ranganation (BBC Two) |
| Best Actor | Best Actress |
| Sean Bean as Mark Cobden – Time (BBC One); Samuel Adewunmi as Hero – You Don't Know Me (BBC One); Olly Alexander as Ritchie Tozer – It's a Sin (Channel 4); Stephen Graham as Tony – Help (Channel 4); Hugh Quarshie as Neville Lawrence – Stephen (ITV); David Thewlis as Christopher Edwards – Landscapers (Sky Atlantic) | Jodie Comer as Sarah – Help (Channel 4); Niamh Algar as Sadie Byrne / Lizzie James – Deceit (Channel 4); Denise Gough as Connie Mortensen – Too Close (ITV); Emily Watson as Dr. Emma Robertson – Too Close (ITV); Lydia West as Jill Baxter – It's a Sin (Channel 4); Kate Winslet as Marianne "Mare" Sheehan – Mare of Easttown (HBO / Sky Atlantic) |
| Best Supporting Actor | Best Supporting Actress |
| Matthew Macfadyen as Tom Wambsgans – Succession (HBO / Sky Atlantic); Nonso Anozie as Tommy Jepperd – Sweet Tooth (Netflix); David Carlyle as Gregory "Gloria" Finch – It's a Sin (Channel 4); Omari Douglas as Roscoe Babatunde – It's a Sin (Channel 4); Stephen Graham as Eric McNally – Time (BBC One); Callum Scott Howells as Colin "Gladys Pugh" Morris-Jones – It's a Sin (Channel 4) | Cathy Tyson as Polly – Help (Channel 4); Céline Buckens as Talitha Campbell – Showtrial (BBC One); Leah Harvey as Salvor Hardin – Foundation (Apple TV+); Jessica Plummer as Emma Matthews – The Girl Before (BBC One); Tahirah Sharif as Lizzie Adama – The Tower (ITV); Emily Mortimer as The Bolter – The Pursuit of Love (BBC One) |
| Best Male Comedy Performance | Best Female Comedy Performance |
| Jamie Demetriou as Stath Charalambos – Stath Lets Flats (Channel 4); Steve Coogan as Alan Partridge – This Time with Alan Partridge (BBC One); Ncuti Gatwa as Eric Effiong – Sex Education (Netflix); Joe Gilgun as Vincent "Vinnie" O'Neill – Brassic (Sky Comedy); Samson Kayo as Maleek – Bloods (Sky One); Tim Renkow as Tim – Jerk (BBC Three) | Sophie Willan as Alma Nuthall – Alma's Not Normal (BBC Two); Natasia Demetriou as Sophie – Stath Lets Flats (Channel 4); Aisling Bea as Áine – This Way Up (Channel 4); Rose Matafeo as Jessie – Starstruck (BBC Three); Anjana Vasan as Amina – We Are Lady Parts (Channel 4); Aimee Lou Wood as Aimee Gibbs – Sex Education (Netflix) |
| Best Entertainment Performance | Best Entertainment Programme |
| Big Zuu – Big Zuu's Big Eats (Dave); Alison Hammond – I Can See Your Voice (BBC One); Sean Lock – 8 Out of 10 Cats Does Countdown (Channel 4); Joe Lycett – Joe Lycett's Got Your Back (Channel 4); Michael McIntyre – Michael McIntyre's The Wheel (BBC One); Graham Norton – The Graham Norton Show (BBC One) | Ant & Dec's Saturday Night Takeaway (ITV); An Audience with Adele (ITV); Life & Rhymes (Sky Arts); Strictly Come Dancing (BBC One) |
| Best Factual Series | Best Specialist Factual |
| Uprising (BBC One); 9/11: One Day in America (National Geographic); The Detectives: Fighting Organised Crime (BBC Two); Undercover Police: Hunting Paedophiles (Channel 4) | The Missing Children (ITV); Black Power: A British Story of Resistance (BBC Two); Freddie Mercury: The Final Act (BBC Two); Silenced: The Hidden Story of Disabled Britain (BBC Two) |
| Best Single Documentary | Best Feature |
| My Childhood, My Country: 20 Years in Afghanistan (ITV); 9/11: Inside the President's War Room (Apple TV+ / BBC One); Grenfell: The Untold Story (Channel 4); Nail Bomber: Manhunt (Netflix) | Big Zuu's Big Eats (Dave); Mortimer & Whitehouse: Gone Fishing (BBC Two); Sort Your Life Out (BBC One); The Great British Sewing Bee (BBC One) |
| Best Reality and Constructed Factual | Best Live Event |
| Gogglebox (Channel 4); Married at First Sight UK (E4); RuPaul's Drag Race UK (BBC Three); The Dog House (Channel 4) | The Earthshot Prize 2021 (BBC One); Springwatch 2021 (BBC Two); The Brit Awards 2021 (ITV); The Royal British Legion Festival of Remembrance (BBC One) |
| Best News Coverage | Best Current Affairs |
| ITV News at Ten: Storming of the Capitol (ITV); Channel 4 News: Black to Front (Channel 4); Good Morning Britain: Shamima Begum (ITV); Sky News: Afghanistan: Endgame (Sky News) | Fearless: The Women Fighting Putin – Exposure (ITV); Four Hours at the Capitol (BBC Two); The Men Who Sell Football – Al Jazeera Investigations (Al Jazeera English); Trump Takes on the World (BBC Two) |
| Best Daytime | Best Short Form Programme |
| The Chase (ITV); Moneybags (Channel 4); Richard Osman's House of Games (BBC Two); Steph's Packed Lunch (Channel 4) | Our Land (Together TV); Hollyoaks Saved My Life (Hollyoaks IRL) (YouTube); People You May Know (Financial Times); Please Help (BBC Three) |
| Best International Programme | Best Sport |
| The Underground Railroad (Amazon Prime Video); Call My Agent! (Netflix); Lupin (Netflix); Mare of Easttown (HBO / Sky Atlantic); Squid Game (Netflix); Succession (HBO / Sky Atlantic) | The Abu Dhabi Grand Prix (Sky Sports F1); ITV Racing: The Grand National (ITV Sport / ITV); Tokyo 2020 Olympics (BBC Sport / BBC One); UEFA EURO 2020 Semi-Final: England v Denmark (ITV Sport / ITV) |
Must-See Moment
Strictly Come Dancing – Rose and Giovanni silent dance to "Symphony" (BBC One); An Audience with Adele – Adele's surprised by the teacher who changed her life (ITV); I'm a Celebrity... Get Me Out of Here – Ant & Dec dig at Downing Street lockdown parties (ITV); It's a Sin – Colin's devastating AIDS diagnosis (Channel 4); RuPaul's Drag Race UK – Bimini's verse in "UK Hun?" (BBC Three); Squid Game – Red Light, Green Light game (Netflix)

== Ceremony ==
The 2022 British Academy Television Awards were held at the Royal Festival Hall in London, returning to a fully in-person event with a full audience for the first time since the COVID-19 pandemic, with a traditional red carpet. Located in the South Bank, fans were also allowed to gather on the Hungerford Bridge pedestrian bridges to watch the red carpet. As well as nominees and others from the television industry, celebrities including sportspeople and musicians attended the ceremony. There were also actors portraying Squid Game characters in red suits. It was hosted by actor and comedian Richard Ayoade, for the third time; Ayoade revealed that he always reads a novel at the ceremony to keep calm, and this year was reading one by John Updike.

The BAFTA Fellowship award was given to Sir Billy Connolly. He joked that he is "such a happy man getting these good attendance medals now my career is out the window".

Actor Ncuti Gatwa, nominated for his role in Sex Education, had been announced as the fifteenth incarnation of The Doctor in Doctor Who, a much-anticipated casting announcement, shortly before the ceremony. He presented an award with co-star and fellow nominee Aimee Lou Wood, during which the pair joked about the casting.

Strictly Come Dancing, specifically dancer Giovanni Pernice and actress partner Rose Ayling-Ellis, won the "Must-See Moment" award for a moment of silence representing Ayling-Ellis' deafness during their dance to "Symphony". In their acceptance speech, a British Sign Language interpreter joined them on-stage. It was reported that some viewers complained to the BBC that this accessibility measure was only brought on stage at this moment, rather than throughout the show. The ceremony was also held at the end of deaf awareness week, with Ayling-Ellis saying that the timing of the award could reinforce the awareness campaign's intention "to educate people about how we can be more inclusive for deaf people all year round, because we're deaf all the time."

Celebrity chef Big Zuu won two awards, with his acceptance speeches being rambling and exuberant. Sophie Willan gave an "expletive-laden" acceptance speech. These were in contrast to some more serious speeches at the ceremony this year, including several referencing the COVID-19 pandemic as series about it won awards. Most acceptance speeches praised alternative public network Channel 4, following the government announcement that it is to be privatised. British Academy of Film and Television Arts chair Krishnendu Majumdar also gave a speech criticising the privatisation to open the ceremony; it also praised the television workers covering the Russian invasion of Ukraine, and called for more diversity.

== In Memoriam ==
- Bamber Gascoigne CBE
- Janice Long
- Tom O'Connor
- Lionel Blair
- Gwyneth Guthrie
- Jimmy Greaves MBE
- Gerald Sinstadt
- Geoff Hill
- Betty White
- Chelsie Whibley
- Lynda Baron
- Sir Antony Sher KBE
- Tony Selby
- Beryl Vertue CBE
- David Frank
- Una Stubbs
- Anna Karen
- Ben Roberts
- George Rossi
- Michael K. Williams
- Barry Cryer OBE
- Jana Bennett OBE
- Linda Kahn
- Jamal Edwards MBE
- Roger Graef OBE
- Kevin Billington
- Anne Stallybrass
- Peter Bowles
- Sarah Harding
- Tom Parker
- John Challis
- Gary Waldhorn
- Sean Lock
- June Brown OBE

== See also ==
- 2022 British Academy Television Craft Awards
