= British Academy Television Award for Best News Coverage =

Annual UK television award

British Academy Television Award
- Country: United Kingdom
- Presented by: British Academy of Film and Television Arts
- First award: 1961
- Currently held by: Channel 4 News: "Israel–Iran: The Twelve Day War" (2026)
- Website: http://www.bafta.org/

The British Academy Television Award for Best News Coverage is one of the major categories of the British Academy Television Awards (BAFTAs), the primary awards ceremony of the British television industry. According to the BAFTA website, the category is for "an individual news programme"

The category has been through some name changes and has been merged a couple of times with other categories like Best Sport and Live Event and Best Current Affairs:

- In 1961 and 1962 an individual award named Best Current Events was presented, later in 1970 a category called Best Factual Current Affair was awarded.
- From 1978 to 1985 and also in 1992 it was presented as Best Actuality Coverage.
- From 1986 to 1991 it was presented as Best News or Outside Broadcast Coverage.
- From 1993 to 1994 and then from 1998 to 2001 it was presented as Best News and Current Affairs Journalism.
- From 1995 to 1997 and then since 2002 it has been presented as Best News Coverage.

== Winners and nominees ==
=== 1960s ===
Year	Title	Recipient(s)	Broadcaster
1961	Sportsview unit		BBC
1962	Bill Allenby		

=== 1970s ===
Best Factual Current Affair

Year	Title	Recipient(s)
1970	News at Ten	
1970	Man on the Moon; Apollo 11; Moon Landing Special	David Nicholas, Geoffrey Hughes
1970	The Money Programme	Michael Bunce

Best Actuality Coverage

Year	Title	Recipient(s)
1978	A Day of Celebration	Anthony Craxton
1978	BBC Coverage of Wimbledon '77	Sports Production Team
1978	Blow Out at Bravo	Grampian Production Team
1978	Jubilee '77	Outside Broadcast Production Team
1979	The Open Golf Championship	AP Wilkinson
1979	Home from the Sea	John Vernon
1979	ITV Coverage of The World Cup	Sports Production Team
1979	Wimbledon '78	AP Wilkinson

=== 1980s ===
Best Actuality Coverage

Year	Title	Recipient(s)
1980	Last Night of the Proms	Ian Engelmann
1980	Cosi Fan Tutte	Peter Hall, John Vernon
1980	Earl Mountbatten's Funeral	Mike Lumley
1980	BBC News Coverage of Fastnet Boat Race	
1981	ITN Coverage of the Iranian Embassy Siege	David Goldsmith and the Production Team
1981	BBC Coverage of the Iranian Embassy Siege	News Production Team
1981	80 Gracious Years	Jim Pople
1981	Embassy World Snooker Championship	Nick Hunter
1981	Wimbledon 1980 Men's Final	Jonathan Martin
1982	ITN Coverage of Poland	
1982	International Snooker	Nick Hunter
1982	BBC Royal Wedding Coverage	Michael Lumley and the Production Team
1982	ITV Royal Wedding Coverage	Jim Pople, Stewart Purvis and the Production Team
1983	BBC Coverage of the Falklands	BBC Television News
1983	News at Ten	
1983	ITN Coverage of the Falklands	ITN Production Team
1983	Raising of the Mary Rose	
1984	ITN Coverage of the Lebanon Crisis	ITN Production Team
1984	Die Fledermaus	Humphrey Burton
1984	The Nation Decides	ITN Production Team
1984	1983 London Marathon	John Shrewsbury
1985	Nine O'Clock News: Ethiopian Famine	Michael Buerk, Mohammed Amin
1985	Breakfast Time, Friday, October 12th - The Brighton Bomb	David Lloyd, Peter O'Kill, Sandy McCourt
1985	Channel 4 News	Stewart Purvis and the Production Team
1985	Coverage of the Brighton Bomb	BBC News Team

Best News or Outside Broadcast Coverage

Year	Title	Recipient(s)
1986	BBC Live Aid for Africa	
1986	Channel 4 News	Stewart Purvis and the Production Team
1986	News at Ten	Alastair Burnet and the Production Team
1986	Newsnight	Richard Tait
1987	Channel 4 News	Stewart Purvis
1987	Hospital Watch	Fiona Holmes, Caroline Van Den Brul
1987	News at Ten: Coverage of the American Bombing Raid on Libya	David Nicholas
1987	Newsnight	Richard Tait
1987	Nine O'Clock News: Coverage of the American Bombing Raid on Libya	Rick Thompson and the Production Team
1987	The Queen in China	Tim Marshall
1987	The Royal Wedding	Tim Marshall
1988	Special Edition Of Channel 4 News: Coverage of the Zeebrugge Disaster	Stewart Purvis
1988	BBC News Coverage of the Zeebrugge Disaster	Ron Neil
1988	Channel 4 News	Richard Tait, Stewart Purvis
1988	News at Ten	Nick Pollard
1989	Channel 4 News	
1989	The Kirov Ballet Live in London	John Michael Phillips
1989	Nelson Mandela Concert	Mike Appleton, Tim Marshall, Neville Bolt
1989	Newsnight	John Morrison

=== 1990s ===
Best News or Outside Broadcast Coverage

Year	Title	Recipient(s)
1990	BBC News: Tiananmen Square Massacre	Steve Selman
1990	BBC Berlin Wall Coverage	John Mahoney
1990	Nine O'Clock News: Kate Adie Secret Report from Chinese Hospital	Kate Adie
1990	ITN Coverage of Romania	
1991	Channel 4 News	
1991	Domingo, Carreras, Pavarotti in Concert	Brian Large
1991	ITN Coverage of Mrs Thatcher's Resignation	David Mannion
1991	World Cup 1990	BBC Sport Production Team

Best Actuality Coverage

Year	Title	Recipient(s)
1992	ITN News Coverage of the Gulf War	Brent Sadler, Production Team
1992	BBC News Coverage of the Gulf War	
1992	Pavarotti in Hyde Park	Christopher Swann, Andy Ward
1992	Newsnight: Soviet Coup Collapses	Tim Gardam

Best News and Current Affairs Journalism

Year	Title	Recipient(s)
1993	Serbian Prison Camps Discovery	Penny Marshall, Ian Williams
1993	BBC Coverage of Sarajevo	Martin Bell
1993	BBC Coverage of the Barcelona Olympics	Martin Hopkins
1993	Newsnight	Tim Gardam
1994	Channel 4 News	
1994	BBC1 Coverage of the Bosnian Massacre	Martin Bell
1994	BBC2 Newsnight Coverage of Kurdistan	George Alagiah
1994	News at Ten Coverage of the Storming of the Moscow White House and the Civil War in Georgia	

Best News Coverage

Year	Title	Recipient(s)
1995	ITN1 Coverage of the Crisis In Rwanda	
1995	Channel 4 News Coverage of the Estonia Ferry Disaster	
1995	Channel 4 News Coverage of the South African Elections	
1995	BBC1 News Coverage on Rwanda	John Simpson
1996	Channel 4 News Coverage of War Crimes in Former Yugoslavia	
1996	BBC1 News Coverage on Bosnia	Martin Bell
1996	BBC2 Newsnight	Peter Horrocks
1996	ITN Coverage of the War in Chechnya	
1997	BBC Newsnight: BSE Coverage	Peter Horrocks
1997	Channel 4 News Coverage of the Refugee Crisis in Zaire and Rwanda	
1997	BBC Newsnight: Dunblane Massacre	Peter Horrocks
1997	ITV News at Ten: Coverage of Dunblane	

Best News and Current Affairs Journalism

Year	Title	Recipient(s)
1998	Panorama: Valentina's Story	Mike Robinson
1998	BBC Election Night Programme	Peter Horrocks
1998	Channel 4 Coverage of the Death of Diana, Princess of Wales	Jim Gray
1998	ITV Coverage of the Death of Diana, Princess of Wales	Nigel Dacre
1999	Dispatches: Inside the Animal Liberation Front	David Monaghan, Deborah Davies, Graham Hall
1999	Correspondent: ETA - Coming in from the Cold	Ewa Ewart, Fiona Murch, Orla Guerin
1999	ITN's Coverage of the Omagh Bomb and its Aftermath	Nigel Dacre and the Production Team
1999	Newsnight: Coverage Of the Northern Ireland Peace Process	Martha Kearney, Sian Kevill

=== 2000s ===
Best News and Current Affairs Journalism

Year	Title	Recipient(s)	Broadcaster
2000	Coverage of the Kosovo Conflict	John Simpson and the BBC News Team	BBC One
2000	Coverage of the Kosovo Conflict	Sky News Production Team	Sky News
2000	The Paddington Crash	The Channel 4 News Team	Channel 4
2000	Tonight with Trevor McDonald: Interview with the Lawrence Suspects	Jeff Anderson, James Goldston, Ingrid Kelly	ITV
2001	Out of Africa	Sorious Samura, Ron McCullagh	Channel 4
2001	Mozambique Floods	BBC News Team	BBC News 24
2001	Mozambique Floods - The Event and the Aftermath		ITV
2001	Panorama: Who Bombed Omagh?	Eamon Hardy, John Ware	BBC One

Best News Coverage

Year	Title	Recipient(s)	Broadcaster
2002	Sky News: September 11th/12th		Sky News
2002	BBC News Coverage of The Fall of Kabul - 12/13 November		BBC News 24
2002	Channel 4 News: Attack on America - 11 September		Channel 4
2002	ITV News: Attack on America - 11 September		ITV
2003	Soham – August 16/17		Sky News
2003	Collapse of the Paul Burrell Trial		BBC News 24
2003	Jenin and Bethlehem - What Chance of Peace?		Channel 4
2003	The Death of the Queen Mother		ITV
2004	Channel 4 News - Fall of Saddam		Channel 4
2004	Newsnight		BBC Two
2004	The Ten O'Clock News		BBC One
2004	Sky News: Fall of Baghdad		Sky News
2005	BBC Ten O'Clock News: Madrid Bombing		BBC One
2005	BBC News 24: Hutton		BBC News 24
2005	Sky News: The Tsunami Disaster		Sky News
2005	Tsunami: Seven Days that Shook the World	ITV News Team	ITV
2006	BBC Ten O'Clock News - 7 July 2005: London Bombs		BBC One
2006	Channel 4 News - The Attorney General Story	Jon Snow, Gary Gibbon, Robert Hamilton	Channel 4
2006	ITV Evening News - The Shooting of Jean Charles de Menezes		ITV
2006	Sky News - 7 July Bombings		Sky News
2007	Granada Reports: Morecambe Bay		ITV
2007	BBC Ten O'Clock News - Terrorism Plot at Heathrow	Craig Oliver, Huw Edwards, Kate Robinson, Daniel Sandford	BBC One
2007	Channel 4 News - News from Iran	Jon Snow, Deborah Rayner, Ben Monro-Davies, Martin Collett	Channel 4
2007	ITV Evening News - The Israel/Lebanon Crisis	Julian Manyon, Mark Austin, Geoff Hill, Rob Bowles	ITV
2008	Sky News - Glasgow Airport Attack		Sky News
2008	BBC Ten O'Clock News: War in Afghanistan	Craig Oliver, Huw Edwards, Alastair Leithead, Thea Fairley	BBC One
2008	ITV Evening News: Zimbabwe - The Tyranny and the Tragedy		ITV
2008	Channel 4 News: Iraq - The Surge	Jim Gray, Jon Snow, Krishnan Guru-Murthy, Ed Fraser	Channel 4
2009	News at Ten - Chinese Earthquake	Bill Neely, John Ray, Rob Bowles, Lu Bo	ITV
2009	Channel 4 News	Jim Gray, Jonathan Miller, Ben De Pear, Soren Munk	Channel 4
2009	Sky News - Canoe Man	Gerard Tubb	Sky News
2009	Sky News - Mumbai		Sky News

=== 2010s ===
Year	Title	Recipient(s)	Broadcaster
2010	ITV News at Ten - Haiti	Mark Austin, Bill Neely, David Harman, John Irvine	ITV
2010	BBC News Channel - The Haiti Earthquake	Kevin Bakhurst, Ben Brown, Matthew Price, Matt Frei	BBC News
2010	Channel 4 News - Haiti Earthquake		Channel 4
2010	Sky News - Pakistan: Terror's Frontline		Sky News
2011	ITV News at Ten: The Cumbria Murders		ITV
2011	BBC News at Ten: Handover of Power	Huw Edwards, James Stephenson	BBC One/BBC News
2011	Channel 4 News		Channel 4
2011	Sky News: Egypt Crisis		Sky News
2012	Channel 4 News: Japan Earthquake		Channel 4
2012	BBC News at Ten: Siege of Homs		BBC One
2012	ITV News at Ten: Battle of Misrata		ITV
2012	Sky News: Libya Rebel Convoy - Live		Sky News
2013	Hillsborough – The Truth at Last (Granada Reports)		ITV
2013	BBC News at Ten: Syria		BBC One
2013	Channel 4 News: Battle for Homs		Channel 4
2014	ITV News at Ten: Woolwich Attacks		ITV
2014	The Lee Rigby Trial: ITV Granada Reports		ITV/ITV Granada
2014	The Dale Cregan Verdict: North West Tonight Special		BBC One/BBC North West
2014	Channel 4 News: Egypt Military Coup		Channel 4
2015	Sky News Live at Five: Ebola	Alex Crawford, Nick Ludlam, Thomas Moore, David Rees	Sky News
2015	BBC News at Ten		BBC News/BBC One
2015	Channel 4 News – Inside Gaza: Children Under Fire	Jon Snow, Ben de Pear, Nevine Mabro	Channel 4
2015	ITV News at Ten: Iraq Crisis		ITV
2016	Channel 4 News: Paris Massacre	Jon Snow, Lindsey Hilsum, Jonathan Rugman, Ben de Pear	Channel 4
2016	BBC News at Six: Paris Attacks Special		BBC One
2016	ITV News at Ten: Refugee Crisis		ITV
2016	Sky News: From Turkey to Greece	Alex Crawford, Garwen McLuckie, Colin Brazier, Kirsty Walker	Sky News
2017	Victoria Derbyshire: Footballers' Abuse	Victoria Derbyshire, Louisa Compton, Jo Adnitt	BBC Two
2017	Channel 4 News: Brexit		Channel 4
2017	BBC North West Tonight: Hillsborough Inquests		BBC One
2017	Sky News Tonight - Aleppo: The Death of a City		Sky News
2018	The Rohingya Crisis (Sky News)		Sky News
2018	The Battle for Mosul (Sky News)		Sky News
2018	The Grenfell Tower Fire (Channel 4 News)	Krishnan Guru-Murthy, Jackie Long, Cathy Newman, Ben de Pear	Channel 4
2018	The Grenfell Tower Fire (ITV News at Ten)		ITV
2019	Cambridge Analytica Uncovered		Channel 4
2019	Bullying and Harassment in the House of Commons (Newsnight)		BBC Two
2019	Good Morning Britain: On A Knife Edge?		ITV
2019	Good Morning Britain: Thomas Markle Exclusive		ITV

=== 2020s ===
Year	Title	Recipient(s)	Broadcaster
2020	Hong Kong Protests		Sky News
2020	ITV News at Ten: Election Results		ITV
2020	Prince Andrew & the Epstein Scandal (Newsnight)		BBC Two
2020	Victoria Derbyshire: Men Who Lost Loved Ones to Knife Crime		BBC Two
2021	Sky News: "Inside IDLIB"		Sky News
2021	BBC News at Ten: Prime Minister Admitted to Intensive Care		BBC News/BBC One
2021	Channel 4 News: Deterring Democracy		Channel 4
2021	Newsnight: COVID Care Crisis		BBC Two
2022	ITV News at Ten: Storming of the Capitol		ITV
2022	Channel 4 News: Black to Front		Channel 4
2022	Good Morning Britain: Shamima Begum		ITV
2022	Sky News: Afghanistan: Endgame		Sky News
2023	Channel 4 News: "Live in Kyiv"		Channel 4
2023	BBC News at Ten: "Russia Invades Ukraine"		BBC One
2023	Good Morning Britain: "Boris Johnson Interview"		ITV
2024	Channel 4 News: "Inside Gaza: Israel and Hamas at War"	Esme Wren, Federico Escher, Helene Cacace, Matt Frei, Secunder Kermani, Millicent Teasdale	Channel 4
2024	Sky News: "Inside Myanmar - The Hidden War"		Sky News
2024	Sky News: "Israel-Hamas War"		Sky News
2025	BBC Breakfast: "Post Office Special"		BBC One
2025	Channel 4 News: "Inside Sednaya - The Fall of Assad"		Channel 4
2025	Channel 4 News: "Undercover Inside Reform's Campaign"		Channel 4
2026	Channel 4 News: "Israel–Iran: The Twelve Day War"		Channel 4
2026	BBC Newsnight: "Grooming Survivors Speak"		BBC Two
2026	Sky News: "Gaza: Fight for Survival"		Sky News

- Note: The series that don't have recipients on the tables had Production team credited as recipients for the award or nomination.
