= News4 =

NEWS4 or News4 or News 4 may refer to:

Philipplines

- News on 4 (1987-1995), a program of People's Television Network, of the Philippines

in the United Kingdom

- Channel 4 News, British television, produced by ITN
- More4 News

in the United States

- News 4 Tucson, also known as KVOA, NBC affiliate of Tucson, Arizona
  - K04QP-D (channel 4), KVOA's translator in Casas Adobes, Arizona
- WJXT, also known as News 4 Jax, Jacksonville, Florida
- News 4 (Reno), also known as KRNV-DT, of Reno, Nevada
- News 4 New York, or WNBC, of New York City, the flagship station of NBC
- News 4 San Antonio, or NEWS4SA, of San Antonio, Texas
- News4Utah, also known as ABC-4, of Salt Lake City, Utah
- WRC-TV, also known as NBC4, of Washington, D.C.

== See also ==
- 4chan
