= Electoral history of Iain Duncan Smith =

Elections featuring British politician

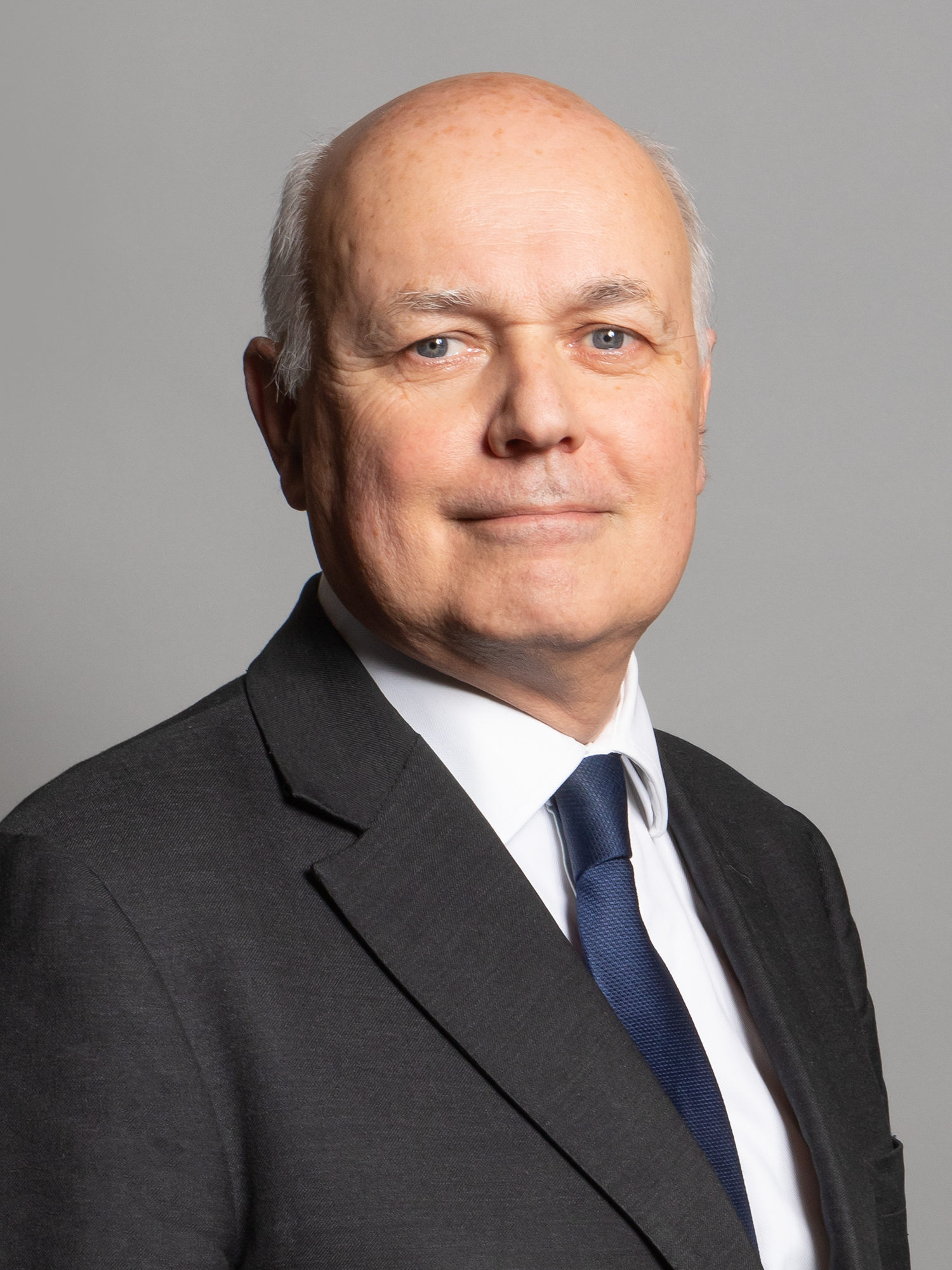
Iain Duncan Smith's official House of Commons portrait from 2020

This is a summary of the electoral history of Iain Duncan Smith, a British Conservative Party politician. Duncan Smith was the Secretary of State for Work and Pensions from May 2010 to March 2016 and was the Conservative leader and Opposition leader from September 2001 to November 2003.

== Parliamentary Elections ==
=== 1987 General Election, Bradford West ===
General Election 1987: Bradford West
Party	Candidate	Votes	%	±%
Labour	Max Madden	25,775	51.9	
Conservative	Iain Duncan Smith	18,224	36.7	
SDP	M.Moghal	5,657	11.4	
Majority		7,551	15.2	
Turnout		49,656	70.2	
Labour hold		Swing	+1.0	

=== 1992 General Election, Chingford ===
General Election 1992: Chingford
Party	Candidate	Votes	%	±%
Conservative	Iain Duncan Smith	25,730	59.2	
Labour	P.J. Dawe	10,792	24.8	
Liberal Democrats	S. Banks	5,705	13.1	
Liberal	D. Green	602	1.4	
Green	J. Baguley	575	1.3	
Independent	C. John	41	0.1	
Majority		14,938	34.4	
Turnout		43,445	78.4	
Conservative hold		Swing	+1.0	

=== 1997 General Election, Chingford and Woodford Green ===
General Election 1997: Chingford and Woodford Green
Party	Candidate	Votes	%	±%
Conservative	Iain Duncan Smith	21,109	47.5	
Labour	Tommy Hutchinson	15,395	34.6	
Liberal Democrats	Geoffrey Seeff	6,885	15.5	
BNP	Alan Gould	1,059	2.4	
Majority		5,714	12.9	New Seat
Turnout		44,448	70.7	

=== 2001 General Election, Chingford and Woodford Green ===
General Election 2001: Chingford and Woodford Green
Party	Candidate	Votes	%	±%
Conservative	Iain Duncan Smith	17,834	48.2	+0.7
Labour	Jessica Webb	12,347	33.4	–1.2
Liberal Democrats	John Beanse	5,739	15.5	0.0
BNP	Jean Griffin	1,062	2.9	+0.5
Majority		5,487	14.8	
Turnout		36,982	58.5	–12.2
Conservative hold		Swing	+1.0	

=== 2005 General Election, Chingford and Woodford Green ===
General Election 2005: Chingford and Woodford Green
Party	Candidate	Votes	%	±%
Conservative	Iain Duncan Smith	20,555	53.2	+5.0
Labour	Simon Wright	9,914	25.7	−7.7
Liberal Democrats	John Beanse	6,832	17.7	+2.2
UKIP	Michael McGough	1,078	2.8	N/A
Independent	Barry White	269	0.7	N/A
Majority		10,641	27.5	
Turnout		38,648	63.0	+4.5
Conservative hold		Swing	+6.4	

=== 2010 General Election, Chingford and Woodford Green ===
General Election 2010: Chingford and Woodford Green
Party	Candidate	Votes	%	±%
Conservative	Iain Duncan Smith	22,743	52.8	−0.4
Labour	Cath Arakelian	9,780	22.7	−3.0
Liberal Democrats	Geoffrey Seeff	7,242	16.8	−0.9
BNP	Julian Leppert	1,288	3.0	N/A
UKIP	Nick Jones	1,133	2.6	−0.2
Green	Lucy Craig	650	1.5	N/A
Independent	None of the Above	202	0.5	N/A
Independent	Barry White	68	0.2	N/A
Majority		12,963	30.1	
Turnout		43,106	66.5	+3.5

- None of the Above (Independent) Original name Adam Osen.

=== 2015 General Election, Chingford and Woodford Green ===
General Election 2015: Chingford and Woodford Green
Party	Candidate	Votes	%	±%
Conservative	Iain Duncan Smith	20,999	47.9	−4.8
Labour	Bilal Mahmood	12,613	28.8	+6.1
UKIP	Freddy Vachha	5,644	12.9	+10.3
Liberal Democrats	Anne Crook	2,400	5.5	−11.3
Green	Rebecca Tully	1,854	4.2	+2.7
TUSC	Len Hockey	241	0.6	N/A
Class War	Lisa Mckenzie	53	0.1	N/A
Majority		8,386	19.1	−11.0
Turnout		43,804	65.7	−0.8
Registered electors		66,680		
Conservative hold		Swing	-5.4	

=== 2017 General Election, Chingford and Woodford Green ===
General Election 2017: Chingford and Woodford Green
Party	Candidate	Votes	%	±%
Conservative	Iain Duncan Smith	23,076	49.1	+1.2
Labour	Bilal Mahmood	20,638	43.9	+15.2
Liberal Democrats	Deborah Unger	2,043	4.4	−1.1
Green	Sinead King	1,204	2.6	−1.7
Majority		2,438	5.2	−13.9
Turnout		46,961	71.2	+5.5
Registered electors		65,958		
Conservative hold		Swing	−7.0	

== 2001 Conservative Party leadership election ==
First Ballot: 8 June 2001
Candidate	Votes	%
Michael Portillo	49	29.5
Iain Duncan Smith	39	23.5
Kenneth Clarke	36	21.6
Michael Ancram	21	12.7
David Davis	21	12.7
Turnout	166	100%

Second Ballot:
Candidate	Votes	%
Michael Portillo	50	30.1
Iain Duncan Smith	42	25.3
Kenneth Clarke	39	23.6
David Davis	18	10.8
Michael Ancram	17	10.2
Turnout	166	100%
Michael Ancram eliminated

Final Ballot:
Candidate	Votes	%
Kenneth Clarke	59	35.5
Iain Duncan Smith	54	32.5
Michael Portillo	53	32
Turnout	166	100%
Michael Portillo eliminated

Membership Ballot
Candidate	Votes	%
Iain Duncan Smith	155,933	60.7
Kenneth Clarke	100,864	39.3
Turnout	256,797	
Iain Duncan Smith elected
