= Lisa McKenzie =

British sociologist

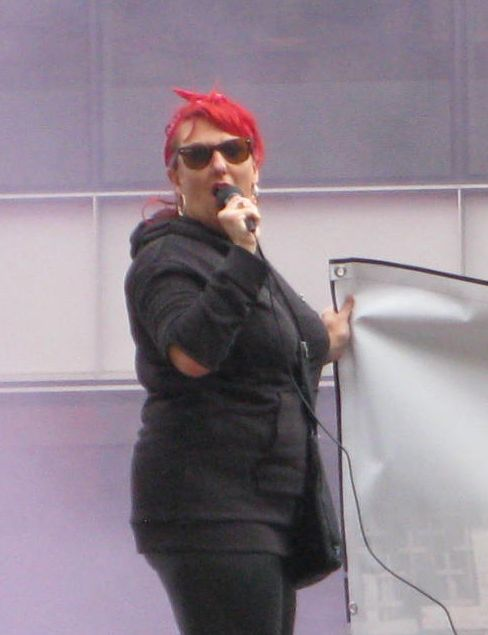
- McKenzie at an anti-austerity demonstration in London, 2015
- Born: Lisa Louise McKenzie; 1968 (age 57–58)
- Title: Senior Lecturer in Sociology

Academic background
- Education: University of Nottingham
- Thesis: Finding value on a council estate: complex lives, motherhood, and exclusion (2009)
- Doctoral advisor: Tony Fitzpatrick and David Parker
- Other advisors: Gillian Paschal and Beverley Skeggs

Academic work
- Discipline: Sociology
- Institutions: London School of Economics; Durham University; University of Bedfordshire
- Notable works: Getting By
- Website: Lisa Mckenzie on Instagram

Lisa Louise McKenzie (born March 1968) is a British lecturer at the University of Bedfordshire whose work relates to class inequality, social justice, and British working class culture. She was active in the Class War party in the 2010s.

== Early life and education ==
Lisa Louise McKenzie was born in 1968 or 1969 and grew up in Sutton-in-Ashfield, near Mansfield. She moved from Mansfield to Nottingham where she had her mixed-race son in 1988 as there were more black people there and she felt more comfortable.

She completed her doctorate in 2009 on "Finding value on a council estate: complex lives, motherhood, and exclusion", also at Nottingham, which dealt with working-class mothers with mixed-race children on the St Ann's estate where she lived at the time. The decision to choose that topic was a result of McKenzie's experiences.

== Politics and activism ==
McKenzie is a self-described anarchist. She opposes social mobility and instead wants the living standards of all working-class people to rise. She opposes private education and the charitable status of private schools. She opposes the sale of public housing through the right-to-buy legislation and wants to keep it public. In April 2015, she was arrested at a protest over the "poor door" at One Commercial Street in London and charged with three public order offences. She was subsequently found not guilty of joint enterprise for causing criminal damage, after a sticker was fixed on a window, as well as acquitted of intent to cause alarm and distress and causing alarm and distress due to lack of evidence.

In the 2015 United Kingdom general election, McKenzie was the Class War party candidate for the Chingford and Woodford Green constituency; she came last, receiving 53 votes (0.1 per cent of the votes cast). The Member of Parliament, Iain Duncan Smith, was re-elected. The Class War party was voluntarily deregistered with the electoral commission in July 2015, 17 months after initial registration.

McKenzie has described the phenomenon of gentrification as a "violent process”. In September 2015, Mckenzie took part in an anti-gentrification protest in London in which the Cereal Killer Cafe was vandalised. She was criticised for saying that the publicity was good for the owners.

== Academic career ==
McKenzie has taught at Nottingham Trent University, University of Nottingham, LSE, Middlesex University, and Durham University. At LSE she was a research fellow on the Great British Class Survey. Since 2023, she has been a senior lecturer in sociology in the School of Applied Social Sciences of the University of Bedfordshire, and serves as external examiner at University of Limerick and Bangor University.

In April 2021 McKenzie launched a kickstarter appeal to fund the project Lockdown diaries of the working class. The resulting book, funded by 800 donors, was published in 2022 by the Working Class Collective, of which McKenzie was a director. It included extracts from the diaries of 47 people for the period of March to May 2020 during the COVID-19 pandemic.

== Bibliography ==
- Getting by: Estates, Class and Culture in Austerity Britain. Bristol: Policy Press. 2015. ISBN 978-1-4473-0995-6.

=== As editor ===
- Atkinson, Rowland; McKenzie, Lisa; Winlow, Simon, eds. (2017). Building Better Societies: Promoting Social Justice in a World Falling Apart. Policy Press. ISBN 978-1447332022.
- Lockdown Diaries of the Working-Class. The Working Class Collective. 2022.
