= Symeon Brown =

English journalist and author

- Born: 1987/88
- Education: London School of Economics
- Occupations: Journalist and author

Symeon Brown (born 1987/88) is an English journalist and non-fiction author from Tottenham, reporting for Channel 4 News as home affairs correspondent. He was a youth community activist.

== Early life and education ==
Brown grew up in social housing in Tottenham, his parents both British Jamaicans, his father involved in crime and his mother a child carer. He has a degree from the London School of Economics. He identifies as "A working class, black Afro-proletariat" and "multi-class". He attended the same primary school as David Lammy.

== Activism ==
Brown was a community organiser, founding Haringey Young People Empowered (HYPE) as a teenager with friends, organising 500 volunteers and winning the Young Haringey Heroes award. With HYPE, he organised a youth football tournament in Wood Green in July 2010 in memory of a teenager murdered earlier that year and against postcode rivalry. In 2010 and 2011, he lobbied Haringey Borough Council for Save Haringey Youth Centres against cuts in the youth services budget. He said the 2011 London riots were due to a loss of trust between young people and the police.

== Career ==
Brown interned with David Lammy MP in 2010. In 2011, he was an assistant archivist at the Black Cultural Archives and a senior researcher on a The Guardian investigative unit on the 2011 England riots on a Scott Trust bursary. He discussed the riots on Radio 4's Today programme in August 2011. He was a panellist on BBC Three's Free Speech Olympics Special in July 2012. He was a panellist at a debate on the criminalization of Drill music held by Diane Abbott MP at the Houses of Parliament in June 2019.

Brown has reported for Channel 4 News since July 2014. The owner of Cereal Killer Cafe in Tower Hamlets cut short an interview for Channel 4 News in December 2014 when Brown asked "Do you think local people will be able to afford £3.20 cereal?" and complained about the report in an open letter.

Brown was a fellow of the John Schofield Trust in 2015 and a Churchill Fellow in 2023. His journalism has appeared on CNN, The Guardian, Huffington Post, New Statesman, Vice, and The Voice. He has reported for Unreported World and was a commissioning executive on the series Untold. He was a judge for the Desmond Elliott Prize in 2022.

=== Recognition ===
Brown was named among "30 to Watch: Journalism" by MHP Group in 2018. He was shortlisted for the 2018 British Journalism Awards, the 2019 Orwell Prize for his piece "The Wolves of Instagram" and a 2022 BAFTA Award for his editorial work with presenter Ayshah Tull on Channel 4's Black to Front day. Brown won Random Acts Live Pitch Award at the 2016 Edinburgh TV Festival, and the Medical Journalists' Association award for News Story of the Year (broadcast) in 2018 for his Channel 4 report on knife crime in hospitals.

=== Books ===
Brown contributed an essay to Derek Owusu's 2019 anthology, Safe: On Black British Men Reclaiming Space.

He published Get Rich or Lie Trying: Ambition and Deceit in the New Influencer Economy (ISBN 9781838950279) with Atlantic Books in March 2022, on the losers of the influencer economy and what The Big Issue called "the undercurrent of fraud, exploitation, bribery and dishonesty behind the glamour." Subjects include his school friends falling for cryptocurrency pyramid schemes, cosmetic surgery failures of LA influencers, and a man paid to be racially abused on social media. In the book, Brown "dismisses individualized, commercialized activism". The IET's E+T magazine said it is "not an in-depth dissection... [h]owever, as an eye-opening, human-focused cruise through the influencer economy, it is a triumph." New Statesman called it "the first serious attempt to expose the hidden darker side of the economy of influencing". The i Paper called it a "well-researched polemic ... wonderfully expansive but moves slightly too quickly through some topics." Chris Stokel-Walker in New Scientist likewise said: "At times, Brown hurtles through first-person stories so fast that there is hardly a chance to blink ... The book's stronger sections are those that bring the action closer to home and address some deeper, more systemic issues." John Maier writing in Literary Review was critical: "a depressing book to read, and not just because it is uncomprehending, lacking in irony and rather poorly written ... One problem seems to be the rather detached, documentary style Brown is committed to, one that leaves no room for serious or sustained analysis". It was reviewed by The Times, Times Literary Supplement, and Financial Times.

In 2026, he published The Good, the Black and the Boujee with Dialogue Books, based on more than 1,500 interviews of Black British perceptions of being middle class and contrasting Black professional success and cultural visibility with the Black Lives Matter movement. He discussed the book on Radio 4's Free Thinking in May 2026.
