= Class War =

UK anarchist group and newspaper established in 1983

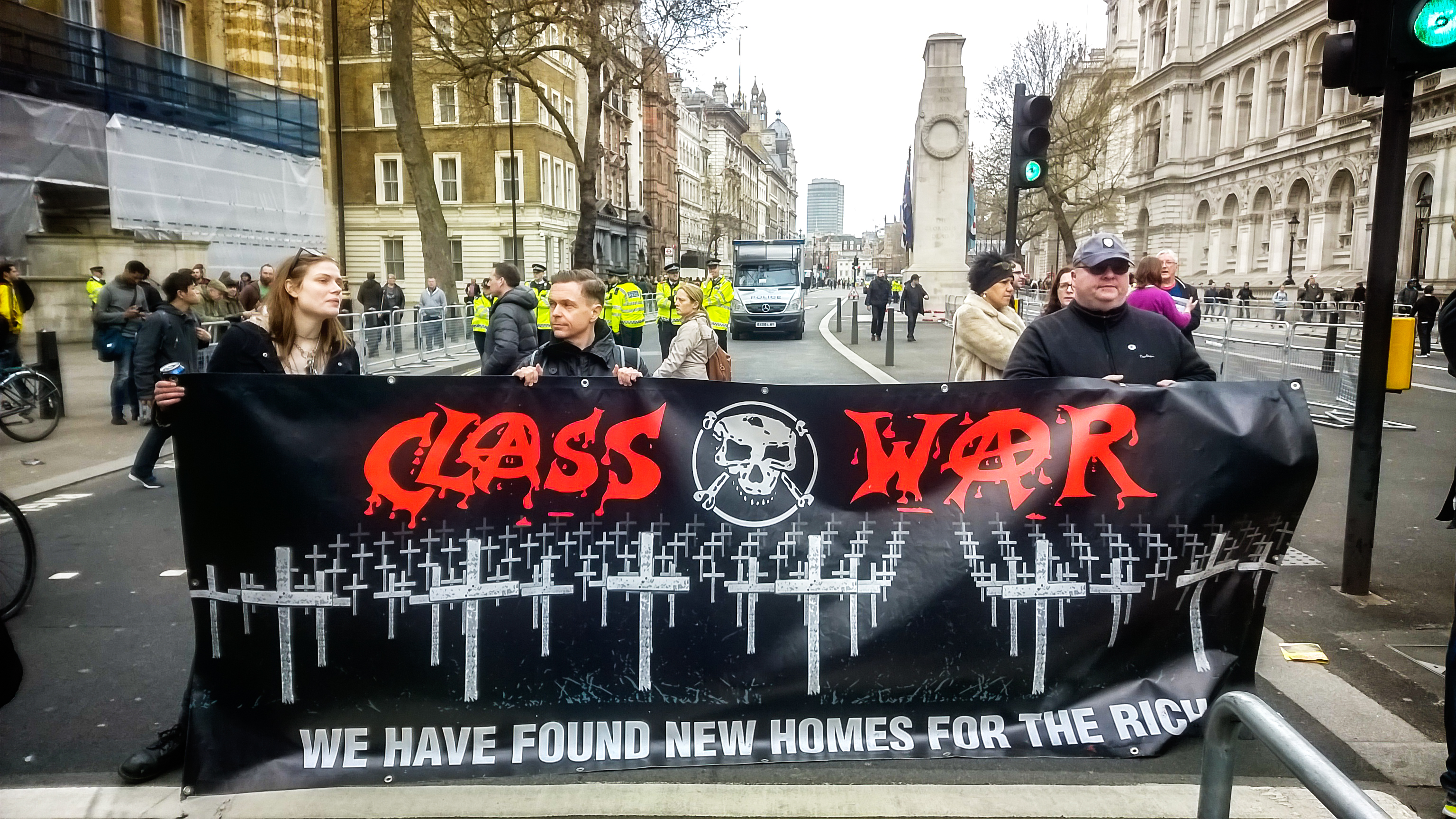
- Class War protest at Downing Street, 2016
- Founder: Ian Bone
- Founded: 1983 (first incarnation); 2015 (second incarnation)
- Dissolved: 1997 (first incarnation); 2015 (second incarnation)
- Merger of: The Alarm; London Autonomists
- Headquarters: London
- Newspaper: Class War
- Membership (c. 1986): 150
- Ideology: Anarchism

Class War was a British anarchist political organisation and registered political party and newspaper established by Ian Bone in 1983. It first gained attention due to its invocations of violence against the ruling class, and rose to prominence within the British left during the 1984–1985 miners' strike and the 1990 poll tax riots. The organisation went into decline during the 1990s and ultimately dissolved in 1997, although a small splinter group continued to publish its newspaper in London until the mid-2000s. An incarnation of Class War was later registered as a political party to contest the 2015 United Kingdom general election.

== Establishment ==
The first government of Margaret Thatcher oversaw a period of rising unemployment, economic recession and widespread rioting in the United Kingdom. After a military victory in the Falklands War, Thatcher was re-elected in 1983, causing a rise in pessimism in the British left and leading to a revival in the British anarchist movement. Around this time, the anarchist Ian Bone was publishing the community newspaper The Alarm, which he used to expose political corruption in Swansea's local government. In 1983, he moved to London and joined a local autonomist group, to whom he proposed the establishment of an anarchist tabloid newspaper aimed at gaining a wider readership.

They began publishing the Class War newspaper, which immediately attracted attention for its celebration of workers assaulting police officers. Class War positioned itself as the antithesis to Thatcherism and the prevailing social order of the 1980s, glorifying workers' solidarity, praising communism and encouraging violence against the rich. This caused a new Red Scare to take hold in the British press, which began writing of an "anarchist menace" as a threat to the British establishment.

Class War broke from anarchism's previous association with lifestylism and liberalism, which had typified the years of the anti-nuclear movement in the United Kingdom. Class War mocked the anarchist pacifism and middle class character of the Campaign for Nuclear Disarmament (CND). According to Albert Meltzer, the newspaper came as a culture shock for the older generation of anarchists, who initially believed it to be a parody of anarchism; correspondents of Freedom denounced the paper's advocacy of violence as "nihilist" and "Marxist".

== Actions ==
=== Stop the City ===
In September 1983, Class War joined the Stop the City protests, carrying out small-scale acts of sabotage in the City of London and organising publicity stunts designed to frighten the ruling class.

=== Miners' strike ===
The 1984–1985 miners' strike accelerated the growth of the British anarchist movement, with Class War reasserting the centrality of class conflict in anarchism. Class War saw the miners' strike as a potentially revolutionary force, with the capacity to bring down Thatcher's government. David Douglass, a representative of the National Union of Mineworkers, concurred with their analysis and joined Class War.

Class War subsequently broke out of its narrow anarcho-punk subculture, forming ties with miners in Doncaster, and publicly supporting strike actions in their newspaper and with financial aid. The miners returned the solidarity, buying the Class War newspaper in large numbers. At its apex, Class War circulated between 15,000 and 20,000 copies. The miners' strike was ultimately defeated, causing a debate within the anarchist movement about the efficacy of trade unionism.

=== Bash the Rich ===
In 1985, Class War organised a series of political demonstrations under the slogan "Bash the Rich". They marched through the rich neighbourhoods of Kensington in May and Hampstead in September, proclaiming themselves the "future executioners" of the local wealthy residents. In Hampstead, they were confronted by a large police presence and quickly forced to disperse. The demonstrations were criticised as "politically inept" by the wider anarchist movement, and Bone himself admitted that the marches had been "disastrous" for Class War.

=== Reorganisation ===
The conflicts of the mid-1980s precipitated a reorganisation of the Class War collective. Between 1985 and 1986, they established a national political organisation: the Class War Federation (CWF). Although Class War had a significant number of supporters, the CWF itself remained relatively small, peaking with only 150 members. From 1987 to 1988, the CWF organised a punk rock concert tour called Rock Against the Rich, gaining the support of Joe Strummer. At its Manchester conference in 1990, the CWF completed its transformation into a fully-formalised organisation with membership fees and a constitution.

=== Poll tax riots ===
Due to Class War's emphasis on community organising and rebellion against the ruling class, it soon became associated with riots, which it promoted and participated in. The British press held Class War responsible for the poll tax riots of 1990, characterising them as "outside agitators". Class War quickly exploited the publicity surrounding it; one member, Andy Murphy, received international attention after he publicly defended the rioters in a television interview. Although critical of Class War, sections of the mainstream left admitted that their left-wing populism had attracted new supporters to radical politics.

== Decline and dissolution ==
This poll-tax riots marked the apex of Class War's political influence, after which it went into a period of decline. By the mid-1990s, the CWF had begun to collapse under the weight of its organisational challenges. In 1992, John Major's government announced the closure of many of Britain's remaining coal mines. Class War attempted to support protests against the closures, but the demonstrations quickly dissipated. Ian Bone and many of its other leading members left the organisation, while in 1993, Tim Scargill broke away and founded a small splinter group which he called the Class War Organisation (CWO).

By this time, much of the British anarchist movement had come to believe that Class War's anti-establishment agitation was no longer productive. Previously-sympathetic anarchist groups now criticised Class War for its underdeveloped political programme, lack of long-term strategy, and self-imposed social marginalisation. British anarchists found that Class War had failed to answer a series of organisational, practical and political questions, which they now aimed to resolve. This gave way to new anarchist political organisations, most notably the Anarchist Federation (AF), which refined Class War's anarchism into a specific theory of anarchist communism and a tighter model of organisation. Many members of the CWF began to push for its dissolution, hoping that it would lead to closer collaboration with the AF and the Reclaim the Streets movement.

At its 1997 conference in Nottingham, the majority of members voted to dissolve the Class War Federation, while a minority of London-based activists remained determined to keep it alive. In the newspaper's 73rd issue, the Leeds-based editorial collective announced the dissolution of Class War, stating that the small organisation had "outlived its usefulness". The final issue ended with a declaration: "Class War is dead... Long live the class war!" Meanwhile, the London group announced that it had purged its less militant members and continued publishing new issues of the newspaper until the mid-2000s. Despite the split, both factions of the former CWF continued cooperating with each other, working together in campaigns against the 1997 election, the monarchy and the Iraq War.

== Contemporary revival ==
Class War at the Anti Austerity demonstration, London, June 2015

In the 2010s, Ian Bone revived Class War as a political party. Their activities included a weekly protest about "poor doors" outside One Commercial Street in Aldgate, with Action East End and Freedom News. These protests ended in partial victory in November 2014. Group member Lisa McKenzie was found not guilty under joint enterprise for causing criminal damage.

In the 2015 United Kingdom general election, Class War stood seven candidates which received a total of 526 votes. The party was voluntarily deregistered with the electoral commission in July 2015.

== Bibliography ==
- Cross, Rich (2014). "British anarchism in the era of Thatcherism". In Smith, Evan; Worley, Matthew (eds.). Against the Grain: The British far left from 1956. Manchester: Manchester University Press. ISBN 9780719095900. OCLC 941255608.
- Donaghey, Jim (2020). "The 'punk anarchisms' of Class War and CrimethInc". Journal of Political Ideologies. 25 (2): 113–138. doi:10.1080/13569317.2020.1750761. ISSN 1469-9613.
- Franks, Benjamin (2006). Rebel Alliances: The Means and Ends of Contemporary British Anarchisms. Edinburgh: AK Press. ISBN 1904859402. OCLC 607401812.
- Franks, Benjamin; Stott, Paul (2011). "Class War". In Ness, Immanuel (ed.). The International Encyclopedia of Revolution and Protest. pp. 1–3. doi:10.1002/9781405198073.wbierp1770. ISBN 9781405198073.
- Marshall, Peter H. (1993). "Britain". Demanding the Impossible: A History of Anarchism. London: Fontana Press. pp. 487–495. ISBN 978-0-00-686245-1. OCLC 1042028128.
- Stott, Paul (2015). "For every action there is an equal and opposite reaction: two responses on the British left to the rise of identity politics – the cases of Class War and Red Action". Twentieth Century Communism. 9 (9): 96–120. doi:10.3898/175864316815923542. ISSN 1758-6437.
