= Ben de Pear =

English journalist

Benjamin de Pear (born 5 December 1970) was, until 2022, the Editor of Channel 4 News, a post he held since 2012.

== Early life ==
De Pear was born on 5 December 1970 in Hammersmith to John Andrew de Pear and Susan Elizabeth Kerr de Pear. He grew up in Staines and several places around the world including Iran and went to middle school in Barbados.

== Career ==
After a traineeship on the Staines and Ashford News, he joined Sky News in 1994 as a runner. From 1996 to 2000, he was a Foreign Overnight editor and producer. In 1999 he produced their RTS award-winning coverage of Kosovo.

From 2000 to 2005, he was Sky's Africa Editor, but was also based for stints in Israel/Palestine, Pakistan, Afghanistan and was Sky's Producer in Baghdad for the fall of the city in April 2003. In 2004, he obtained the first sit down interview with President Robert Mugabe of Zimbabwe.

In 2005, he joined Channel 4 News producing their award-winning coverage of Lebanon, Somalia, Congo and Afghanistan and as Foreign Editor from 2008 led their investigation of Killing Fields in Sri Lanka.

In 2012, he became Editor of Channel 4 News, and under his editorship the programme has won 4 International Emmys, 4 RTS News Programmes of the Year and 3 BAFTAs, 2 Peabody Awards and produced a feature long Cannes winning and Oscar nominated documentary, "For Sama". Channel 4 News has won over 200 awards since 2012, gained audience and become the most watched news programme on social media in the UK.

In March 2017, de Pear issued an apology after Channel 4 News wrongly identified the perpetrator of the 2017 Westminster attack. It emerged that the person the programme had named as responsible was in prison at the time of the attack.

In January 2018, de Pear was criticised after he liked a tweet by Kathy Burke, which called both Boris Johnson and Toby Young "a cunt". A year later, he complained that Johnson wouldn't appear on his programme, claiming not to know the reason for the now Prime minister declining Channel 4 News requests.

In August 2021, Channel 4 and ITN announced that de Pear would step down from Channel 4 News as editor. De Pear stepped down in January 2022.

Media offices
Preceded by Jim Gray	Editor of Channel 4 News; August 2012 -	Succeeded by Incumbent
Preceded by	Foreign Editor of Channel 4 News; January 2009 - January 2011	Succeeded by
