= Ian Bone =

English anarchist and publisher

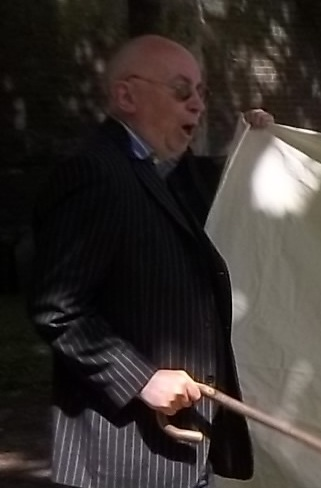
- Bone in 2013
- Born: Ian David Bone; 28 August 1947 (age 78); Mere, Wiltshire, England
- Known for: Social and political activism

Ian David Bone (born 28 August 1947 in Mere, Wiltshire) is an English anarchist and publisher of anarchist newspapers and tabloids, such as Class War and The Bristolian.

In 1984, British tabloid newspaper The Sunday People described Bone as "The Most Dangerous Man in Britain".

== Activities ==
Ian Bone is the son of a butler, and has said that this background greatly contributed to his later political outlook. He studied politics at Swansea University, becoming an active anarchist throughout the 1960s to early 1990s. He set up the anarchist agit-mag Alarm in Swansea. In 1983, with others, he established the anarchist paper Class War. The confrontational style of the paper led to Bone becoming an infamous figure in the politics of the 1980s.

In October 1994, Bone organised the Anarchy in the UK festival.

In 2001 he revived The Bristolian, which fielded candidates in the 2003 Bristol city council elections and was runner-up for the Paul Foot Award for investigative journalism in 2005.

Tangent Books published Bone's autobiography, Bash the Rich, in 2006. To promote the book, Bone organised a "Bash the Rich" march through Notting Hill, claiming he would march on David Cameron's house.

In September 2018, Russia Today broadcast footage of Bone doorstepping Conservative MP Jacob Rees-Mogg, shouting "Your daddy is a very horrible person" and "lots of people hate your daddy" at his young children. Bone's targeting of Rees-Mogg's children was widely condemned.

In May 2021, Bone unsuccessfully stood for election in a council by-election in Croydon.

== Works ==
- Bone, Ian (2006). Bash the Rich: True Life Confessions of an Anarchist in the UK. Naked Guides Ltd. p. 280. ISBN 0-9544177-7-1.
- Anarchy in the UK podcast episodes
