= More4 News =

British news programme

- More4 News title card
- Country of origin: United Kingdom
- Original language: English

Production
- Producer: ITN
- Running time: 30 minutes

Original release
- Network: More4
- Release: 10 October 2005 – 18 December 2009

Related
- Channel 4 News

More4 News was a daily news programme on the More4 digital television channel in the United Kingdom, that aired Monday to Friday from 8.00 pm to 8.30 pm from 2005 to 2009.

== History ==
More4 News launched at the inception of the More4 channel on 10 October 2005. As a consequence of the advertising slowdown during the 2009 recession, the programme was cancelled, the last broadcast airing on 18 December 2009. It was the sister programme of the Channel 4 News and was nominated by the Royal Television Society as the News Programme of the Year, 2007.

== Production Team ==
Anchors
Alex Thomson

Kylie Morris

Sarah Smith

Krishnan Guru-Murthy

Keme Nzerem

Editor
David Mapstone

Assistant Editor
Mick Hodgkin

Film Executive
Iain Overton

Producers/Directors
Andrew Thomas
Nima Elbagir
Girish Juneja
Nina Teggarty
Harry Anscombe
Helene Cacace
David Fuller
Rags Martel

Producers
Samantha Haque
Simon Stanleigh
