= Alex Thomson (journalist) =

British journalist

Alexander James Thomson is a British television journalist and newscaster.

== Early life ==
In his gap year, he taught at Fyling Hall School.

== Career ==
Thomson has worked for the BBC in Northern Ireland. He has been with ITN's Channel 4 News since 1988 and is the longest-serving onscreen journalist on the programme.

In June 2012, Thomson's vehicle, in which he and other journalists were travelling while covering the Syrian uprising, came under fire and took evasive action. According to Thomson and others present, this was the result of a small group from the Free Syrian Army who attempted to have the team killed in no-man's land by the government forces as a propaganda stunt to discredit Damascus.

In 2012, Thomson turned his attention to the events associated with the administration and liquidation of Rangers FC, with Phil Mac Giolla Bhain concentrating on the tax avoidance and corporate governance issues of Rangers. Thomson produced a number of Channel 4 News reports as well as blog posts on this topic. He contributed the foreword to Phil Mac Giolla Bhain's book Downfall: How Rangers FC Self Destructed.

== Personal life ==
Thomson is a supporter of Newcastle United.
