= Ciaran Jenkins =

Welsh journalist and reporter

- Born: Merthyr Tydfil, Wales
- Education: Fitzwilliam College, Cambridge
- Employer: Channel 4
- Relatives: Bethan Sayed (sister)

Ciaran Jenkins (born 1984, in Merthyr Tydfil, Wales) is a Welsh journalist and reporter who works for Channel 4 News, the flagship news programme of British broadcaster Channel 4. He was the channel's Scotland correspondent.

== Personal life ==
Jenkins, from Merthyr Tydfil, read music at Fitzwilliam College, Cambridge, graduating in 2005 and was a gifted cellist, reaching the final of the Texaco Young Musician of Wales competition in 1999.

== Career ==
After leaving university, Jenkins lived in Japan where he studied Japanese and wrote articles for The Guardian newspaper's Comment is Free website. He studied at Cardiff University School of Journalism during which time he developed a popular political blog, Blamerbell Briefs.

Jenkins is a former BBC Cymru Wales education correspondent, appearing frequently on BBC Wales Today and the Welsh language news programme, Newyddion.

Jenkins conducted in-depth investigations into bogus academics and fraud in 2011, which led to the effective abolition of the University of Wales, formerly Britain's second-largest university.

Jenkins joined Channel 4 News as a reporter in January 2012. In 2023, he was succeeded as Scotland Correspondent by Kathryn Samson.

== Awards ==
Jenkins was named Royal Television Society Young Journalist of the Year 2012 for his work on Channel 4 News.

Jenkins also won the Current Affairs category at the Celtic Media Awards 2012 for his investigation, Cash for Qualifications, which exposed potential visa and exam fraud at the University of Wales. His earlier investigation, University Challenged, won Best News, Current Affairs & Sport programme at BAFTA Wales in 2011.

Jenkins won Grand Prize at the inaugural CNN European News Blog Awards in 2006 for his political blog Blamerbell Briefs.
