= Kathryn Samson =

Scottish television journalist

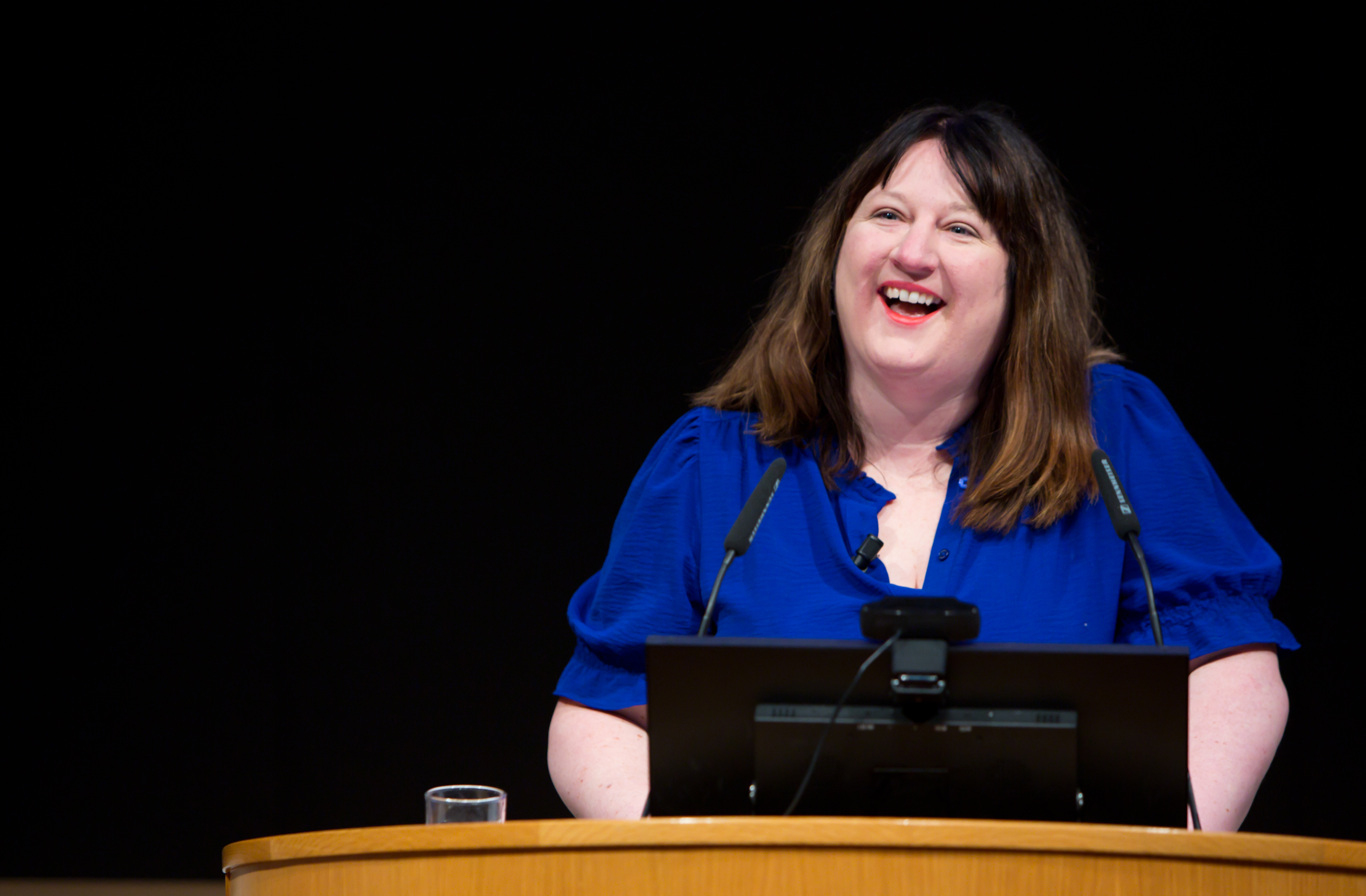
- Education: University of Glasgow and Cardiff University
- Occupation: Journalist
- Television: Channel 4 News, Scotland Correspondent.

Kathryn Samson is a Scottish television journalist and news presenter. She was awarded the Royal Television Society's Nations and Regions Presenter of the Year award in 2022.

== Early life and education ==
Samson was born in Stirling, Scotland, and attended Stirling High School, where she was Head Girl in 2001. She studied at the University of Glasgow, gaining an MA in History & English, going on to attend the Cardiff School of Journalism. Her career path was influenced by watching coverage of the 1996 Dunblane massacre.

== Career ==
Samson began her career at BBC Scotland, after which she worked as a political reporter and presenter at ITV. From 2019 - 2023 she worked as Westminster Correspondent, and then Westminster Editor, for STV. In 2023, she became the Scotland correspondent for Channel 4 News, taking over the role from Ciaran Jenkins, and saying that she had always "watched and admired" the programme.

She has been praised by others in the industry for her direct and robust interview style, which has included presenting then-Prime Minister Boris Johnson with a £20 note during an interview concerning changes to Universal Credit, asking "How many £20 notes would I need to give you to get a peerage?"

== Awards ==
In 2020, Samson was awarded STV Journalist of the Year.

In 2022, she was named Nations and Regions presenter of the Year at the Royal Television Society's Television Journalism Awards, for her work on Scotland Tonight & STV News at Six, with judges noting her "“empathy when needed, passion and humour”.
