= Keme Nzerem =

Nigerian British journalist

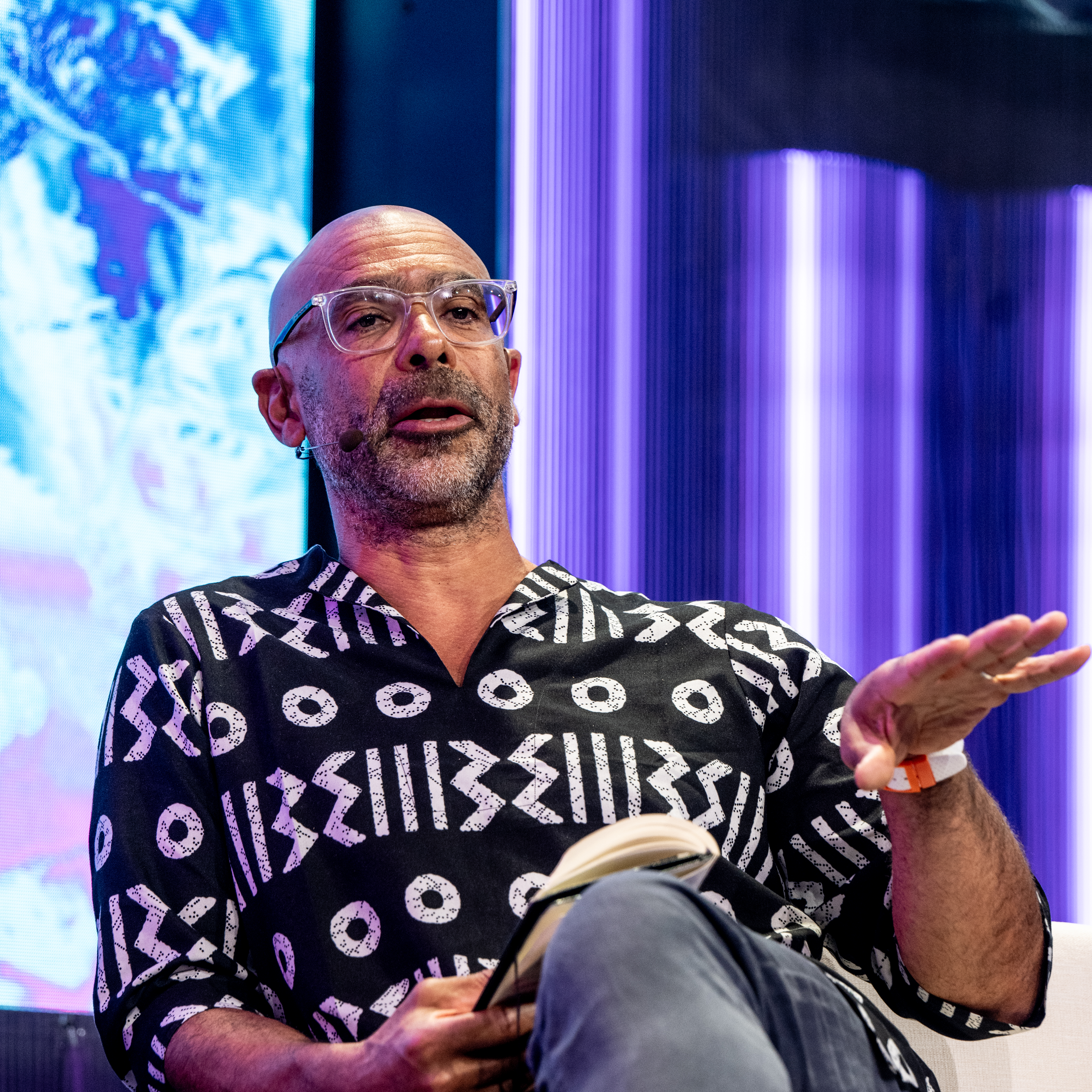
- Keme Nzerem, 2026 SXSW London festival
- Born: Ejikeme George Nzerem; Lusaka, Zambia
- Occupations: Journalist. TV presenter, filmmaker

Ejikeme George Nzerem is a Nigerian British American journalist, TV presenter and filmmaker best known for his work on the UK's Channel 4 News as a news anchor and reporter. He joined the programme in 2001.

== Early life ==
Nzerem was born in Lusaka, Zambia to a Nigerian father and American mother. He was brought up in Zambia, Northern Ireland, Yorkshire, and London.

== Education ==
Nzerem went to his local secondary school in southeast London, Thomas Tallis comprehensive. In 1995 he received a first-class BA (hons) in Geography with African and Asian Studies from the University of Sussex, and in 2000 a PGDiP in Broadcast Journalism from City University.

== Journalism, TV and media career ==
In 1998 after graduating from the University of Sussex Nzerem worked as a writer for the charity Comic Relief, and helped launch an anti racist education website called Britkid.

In 2000 while studying for his postgrad in Broadcast Journalism at City University Nzerem secured work experience at the UK Channel 4 News which is made by ITN. After graduating in the summer of 2000 Nzerem joined the launch team of ITNs fledgling News Channel.

Nzerem transferred to Channel 4 News in 2001 as a sports producer and presenter. A few months later a former schoolmate was arrested trying to blow up a plane with a bomb hidden in his shoe. Nzerem made a film about the so-called “shoe bomber” Richard Reid, and wrote about it in the Guardian.

In 2003 Nzerem was appointed Channel 4 News’ Home Affairs producer, and in 2005 he was appointed Washington producer and reporter. Many of his reports were also broadcast by PBS, for example his coverage of Hurricane Katrina.

Nzerem moved back to Channel 4’s UK newsroom in 2007, returning to Washington to cover the historic election of Barack Obama a year later. He won the RTS foreign news award for narrating a film about the US troop surge in Iraq. He also began presenting Channel 4 News’ sister show More 4 News.

Nzerem was appointed sports correspondent after covering the football World Cup in South Africa in 2010. He went on to cover the Sochi Olympics and Paralympics, the London 2012 Olympics and Paralympics, corruption in FIFA and the football World Cup in Brazil 2014, during which time he regularly reported on social issues connected to major sports events.

He hosted and appeared in panels on the ethics of sport from The University of Texas to the FIFA conference on Diversity and Inclusion. In 2016 Nzerem returned to general news reporting and made many films, covering a wide range of topics from autism in females, the Grenfell Tower fire, to the Black Lives Matter protests of 2020.

In 2018 Nzerem began making a documentary about his family and the legacy of slavery.

In 2021 Nzerem received a BAFTA nomination for a special episode of Channel 4 News he presented showcasing Black talent, which included a film he made in Nigeria on calls to return the Benin Bronzes.

Nzerem has featured as a reporter in the HBO TV drama series Station Eleven, and appeared on a number of game shows including The Weakest Link and Pointless Celebrities.

Nzerem runs his own media training consultancy and works for a number of agencies providing similar services. His agent is Knight Ayton.

== Outdoor adventure and environment career ==
Nzerem learned to ski while a teenager on an artificial slope at Woolwich Barracks in south east London during his summer holidays. He has written about skiing in the Guardian and the Good Ski Guide, and featured as a mountain bike and ski model. He was invited to be a juror for the Banff Mountain Film Festival and became chair of judges for the Kendal Mountain Film Festival in 2014. He posts regularly about ski-touring, and the long distance bikepacking trips he undertakes in Italy and the UK.

Nzerem is one of a growing number of outdoor adventurers from Britain’s ethnically diverse communities, and in 2021 he co-founded a non profit working on equity and diversity in outdoors sport called Opening Up the Outdoors (OUTO). In the aftermath of the murder of George Floyd Nzerem was approached by snowboarder, trail runner and creative producer Phil Young to help break down the barriers facing People of Colour in outdoor adventure. Together they launched OUTO with support from leading outdoor brands and institutions including Patagonia, The North Face, Adidas Terrex, Vivo Barefoot, Arc’Teryx, Wiggle, Salomon and Osprey. Nzerem is Vice President of the Its Great Out There Coalition.

Nzerem regularly chairs and hosts thought leadership and business panels and events about outdoor adventure, business and the environment including UK National Parks, The European Outdoor Summit, #saveourwildisles, and The Blue Earth Summit.

== Charity work ==
Nzerem is a trustee of The Ethical Journalism Network, and was closely involved in their 2023 report on Structural Racism in UK Newsrooms. Nzerem co-founded Opening Up the Outdoors, and is Vice President of the Its Great Out There Coalition. Nzerem was a trustee of education and social justice charity Football Beyond Borders from 2016 - 2023.

== Awards and recognitions ==
In 2008, Nzerem received the Royal Television Society foreign news award for a report on the American 2007 Iraq troop surge. He was nominated for a BAFTA in 2022 for presenting Black to Front for Channel 4 News.

== Background ==
Nzerem is Aro, a subgroup of the Igbo people of south eastern Nigeria. His father is Nigerian and his mother is American. He has one sister. He is married to leadership and culture coach Kate Franklin. They have two daughters.

== See also ==
- List of Igbo people
