= Cereal Killer Cafe =

Chain of cafés serving branded breakfast cereals

Coordinates: 51.52391°N 0.07160°W

Cereal Killer Café

- The branch in Brick Lane
- Type: Café
- Founded: 2014
- Founder: Alan and Gary Keery
- Defunct: (UK only)
- Fate: Closed (UK only)
- Headquarters: East End, London, Dubai, Doha, England
- Number of locations: 5

Cereal Killer Café is a chain of cafés that serve branded breakfast cereals. The original café was located on Brick Lane in Spitalfields, London and was the first cereal-themed café in the United Kingdom. The chain announced the closure of its UK locations on 8 July 2020 as a result of the COVID-19 pandemic. As of 2023, the Dubai cafe remains open and the chain's website continues to offer customers more than 100 different types of cereal.

== Development ==
Identical twins Alan and Gary Keery, from Belfast, came up with the idea of selling breakfast cereal after experiencing a morning hangover during a lunch break in Shoreditch and craving a "sugary cereal fix". The brothers were initially dissuaded from pursuing the project but continued after conducting their own market research. Inspired by established cereal cafes in the United States and the premise of the 2005 film Flakes, they went about asking consumers on the streets whether or not they would buy into the concept. They discovered that more than half of the people they had asked would consider visiting their cafe. Funding for the proposal came from a business loan following an unsuccessful £60,000 crowdfunding attempt on Indiegogo. They claimed they found it difficult to rent a location based on their business venture but eventually settled on an old video store.

== Business ==
The interior of the Brick Lane branch

The two-storey café was situated on Brick Lane, near Shoreditch, and employed eight staff. The interior was designed to reflect a retro style with exposed brickwork, formica furniture and 1980s and '90s music. Among the decor were novelty cereal boxes, vintage milk bottles and other cereal-related memorabilia. The cafe offered more than 100 different varieties of global cereal brands, 12 kinds of milk and 20 toppings. It also sold coffee, toast and poptarts.

In 2014, the brothers were challenged by Channel 4 over the price of their bowls of cereal in Tower Hamlets. Despite being shown the London borough had some of the highest rates of poverty in the country, Gary denied that this was the case and said his cereal was "cheap for the area", before refusing to continue with the interview.

Media commentary ranged from praise of their entrepreneurship from Boris Johnson to criticism pointing at gentrification around Shoreditch, with the Keerys terminating a 2014 interview with Channel Four after reporter Symeon Brown asked: "Do you think local people will be able to afford £3.20 cereal?" In response, the brothers wrote an open letter to the broadcaster on Facebook, characterising the reporting as "unfair" and announced plans to provide free breakfasts for underprivileged children; however, no schools, youth groups or charities were approached.

On an evening in September 2015, anti-gentrification activists threw paint at the building and wrote the word "scum" across it.

By 2017, the brothers had opened cereal cafes in Birmingham, Dubai, Kuwait and Jordan. The London branch of the cafe closed in 2020, with the brothers remaining to operate in Dubai in the United Arab Emirates.

== See also ==
- Lisa McKenzie
- List of restaurants in London
