= Phil Mac Giolla Bhain =

Irish journalist and writer

- Born: Philip Joseph Gerard Mac Giolla Bhain; Glasgow, Scotland
- Education: University of York
- Occupation: Journalist
- Children: Cathal, Roisin, Aislinn
- Website: http://www.philmacgiollabhain.ie

Philip Joseph Gerard Mac Giolla Bhain is a Glasgow-born Irish blogger, author, playwright and freelance journalist.

== Career ==
From 1999 to 2006 he was a staff journalist with An Phoblacht a newspaper published by Sinn Féin, writing under the pen name Mick Derrig, a reference to Mac Giolla Bhain's maternal grand-uncle.

Mac Giolla Bhain came to prominence by charting events leading to the financial collapse of the Glasgow football club Rangers. In April 2010 he detailed the extent of the club's tax liabilities to The News of the World. He authored the 2012 book Downfall: How Rangers FC Self Destructed. The book was due to be serialised in The Scottish Sun, a British tabloid newspaper, who published an article praising Mac Giolla Bhain's courage in overcoming intimidation while carrying out his work.

After Scottish Sun journalist Simon Houston received threats, and an angry and negative response from Rangers supporters "jammed the switchboards" of local radio sports broadcasts, the editor of The Scottish Sun cancelled the serialisation. The paper envisaged a boycott from Rangers fans, similar to that experienced in Merseyside by the English edition of the paper by Liverpool F.C. fans after coverage of the Hillsborough disaster. The Sun had been made aware of one of his blog posts titled 'The Incubator'. The Sun stated that it had cancelled the serialisation because of a blog post written by Mac Giolla Bhain ridiculing Rangers fans that they considered sectarian.

In 2010, Mac Giolla Bhain also broke the story of Hugh Dallas sending an e–mail which led to his sacking from the position of Head of Referee Development at the Scottish Football Association.

In 2018 his debut novel "The Squad" was published by Frontline Noir.

In 2016 Mac Giolla Bhain won an award for Best International Football Blog category (fans' choice) in the Football blogging Awards.

== Plays ==
Phil Mac Giolla Bháin is a published playwright. His work has been performed in Ireland and Scotland.

His first play "Flight of the Earls: a play about modern Ireland" was first performed at the Balor Theatre in Donegal in 2005. It then toured venues in the west of Ireland in 2007.

In June 2014 the play was performed by the Sweet For Addicts theatre group in Glasgow. This was the start of a collaboration and he has since written two plays specifically for SFA.

In 2015 "Hame" a play about a Glasgow Irish family living through the events of the Independence Referendum was performed by SFA at the Shed.

In 2016 Sweet For Addicts performed "Rebellion" to commemorate the centenary of the 1916 Easter Rising.

In 2019 Sweet For Addicts performed "Rebellion" in the Websters Theatre, Glasgow.

== Personal life ==
After training to be a social worker, and working in Glasgow, Mac Giolla Bhain moved to County Donegal in 1996.

Mac Giolla Bhain was a member of the Donegal Mountain Rescue Team. In 2010, Mac Giolla Bhain, as a sufferer from depression, was part of a campaign by Amnesty International to raise awareness of and oppose discrimination of those with mental health conditions.

== Bibliography ==
- Preventable Death: The scandal of male suicide in modern Ireland (2008)
- A Rebel Journalist: From the Famine Song to Dallasgate (2011)
- Downfall: How Rangers FC self-destructed (2012)
- Minority Reporter: Modern Scotland's bad attitude towards her own Irish (2013)
- The Squad (2018)
- Native Shore (2022)
