= Ayshah Tull =

British journalist

- Born: London, England
- Education: King's College London; City, University of London
- Years active: 2010–present
- Title: Presenter, journalist

Ayshah Tull is a British presenter and journalist at Channel 4 News. Formerly, she was at the BBC working mainly for the children's news programme, Newsround. Tull has also presented for BBC Sport along with having her reports appear on BBC Breakfast, World TV, and the Victoria Derbyshire programme.

== Career ==
In 2010, she was one of 4000 applicants for 12 places on a BBC Production Trainee Scheme. After working as a producer on BBC Radio 5 Live (including BBC's coverage of the Olympics) and Sky News, she had a successful screentest as a presenter in 2013.

== Background ==
Tull is from Perivale, West London. Her mother is Guyanese. Tull attended the Ellen Wilkinson School for Girls in Acton and took a degree in geography at King's College London London followed by a postgraduate certificate in broadcast journalism at City, University of London.

Tull was an NUJ- administered recipient of an ethnic journalism George Viner Memorial Fund grant in 2009. She was shortlisted for a Diversity in Media Award in the Journalist or Writer of the Year category in 2018. In 2019, Tull was named an ambassador for the charity Mencap, which supports people with learning disabilities.
