= Stewart Purvis =

British broadcaster, executive, author and academic

Stewart Peter Purvis CBE is a British broadcaster, broadcasting executive, author and academic.

Purvis is married with three children.

== Education ==
Purvis was educated at Southville School, a state primary in Feltham, West London then Dulwich College, an independent school for boys in Dulwich in South London. He graduated with a BA in Politics from the University of Exeter.

== TV Journalism ==
Stewart's media career began as a local radio reporter, a regional television presenter and a Sunday tabloid freelance while still at university. He was then chosen as one of the BBC's first three News Trainees in 1969. He moved to ITN in 1972 where he went on to win Royal Television Society awards for news and documentaries, two BAFTA awards as Editor of Channel Four News and also collected a TV Times award and even an ‘Office Building of the Year’ award for ITN’s Norman Foster -designed headquarters in Gray's Inn Road, London.

Purvis became the third editor of ITN's Channel 4 News in 1983 after a troubled launch and is generally credited with creating the programme in its current ethos.

While editing Channel Four News he also produced a 1985–86 TV project with the Prince and Princess of Wales. ‘Talking Personally’ was one of the top ten most-watched programmes of 1985 and the two-part documentary ‘In Private, In Public’ was watched by 18.45 million, putting it into the top five programmes of 1986.

In December 1992 he broke the story of the separation of the Prince and Princess on the ITV Lunchtime News, before the announcement later that day by Prime Minister John Major.

In 1987 Purvis was promoted to Editor of ITN and subsequently its chief executive and editor-in-chief. During his time heading ITN he was also president of the international news channel, EuroNews, based in Lyon, France. He helped to launch EuroNews into Russia as the country’s first news channel in Russian on terrestrial television

After ITN’s successful coverage of the 2003 Iraq War, Purvis retired from the company after 31 years and began a career in academia. In November 2007 Purvis became Content and Standards Partner at the UK regulator OFCOM, effectively the regulator of UK broadcast content, responsible for the implementation of the Ofcom Broadcast Code and other broadcasting regulation, a position he held until 2010.

He also chaired the UK Government’s Media Literacy Working Group and was one of the founders of the online academic resource Newsfilm Online. He was on the panel set up by the BBC Governors to report on the BBC’s coverage of the Israel-Palestinian conflict in 2006.

In 2000 he was made a CBE for services to broadcast journalism, in 2005 he was made an Honorary Doctor of Law by Exeter University and in 2009 he received the Royal Television Society’s Gold Medal for an outstanding contribution to television. He has also been a Specialist Advisor to the House of Lords Select Committee on Communications.

He has been a regular expert commentator on media matters and a columnist for the Financial Times and London Evening Standard. In 2011 he made a BBC Radio Four documentary ‘When Reporters Cross the Line'.

Since September 2013 Purvis has been a non-executive Director of Channel 4. His appointment runs until March 2021.

Purvis is a non-executive director of Brentford FC and was appointed in 2019. He is Chairman of the Brentford Supporters Trust ‘Bees United’

== Academic ==
Purvis was the first Professor of Television Journalism at City University, London. In 2004-5 he was News International Visiting Professor of Broadcast Media at Oxford University.

== Author ==
Purvis has co-authored 2 books with Jeff Hulbert, media historian and honorary research fellow in the Journalism Department at City University, London:

- Jeff Hulbert and Stewart Purvis (2013). When Reporters Cross The Line. Biteback Publishing. ISBN 978-1-84954-646-1.
- Purvis, Stewart; Hulbert, Jeff (2016). Guy Burgess: The Spy Who Knew Everyone. London: Biteback Publishing. ISBN 978-1-84954-913-4.
