= Relay Building =

Building in Whitechapel, London, England

Coordinates: 51°30′55.2″N 0°4′20.7″W

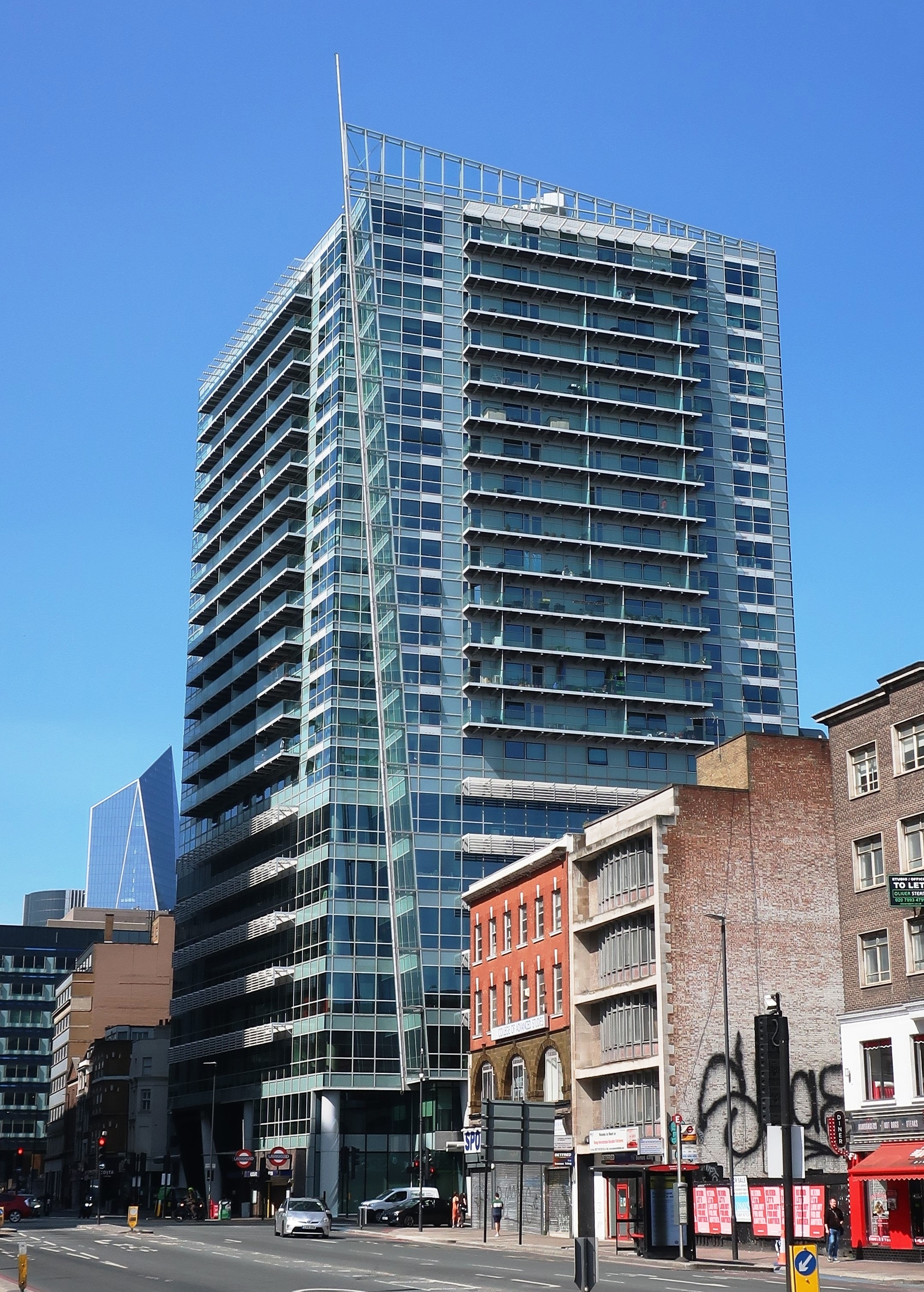
The Relay Building

The Relay Building, originally known as One Commercial Street, is a 21-storey residential block in Whitechapel at the junction of Whitechapel High Street and Commercial Street, London E1. Despite the building's former name, the main entrance is in Whitechapel High Street, and the postal address is 114 Whitechapel High Street.

The building opened in 2014. The developer was Redrow; and the architects were Sigma Seifert. The contractor was John Sisk & Son, a member of the Sisk Group. Construction had been suspended in 2008, but with the recovery in the London housing market, the development was purchased by Redrow. As well as 207 apartments, there is 110,000 sq ft of offices over six floors, retail space on the ground floor and car parking in the basement. The ground floor incorporates one of the western entrances to Aldgate East tube station.

== Design ==
The developer Redrow described the building as "like a blade of light, its glass fin protruding dramatically to add a sculptural quality to Redrow London's first flagship development". Building Design, however, commented: "First flagship development? Please God let it also be their last. No one who can liken this incoherent hulk of ill-fitting glass sheets to a blade of light deserves to build again in such a sensitive location." In July 2014, the building was nominated for the Carbuncle Cup, awarded for "the ugliest building in the United Kingdom completed in the last 12 months".

The International Property Awards, on the other hand, honoured the building as "Best Residential High-Rise Development UK, 2013–14".

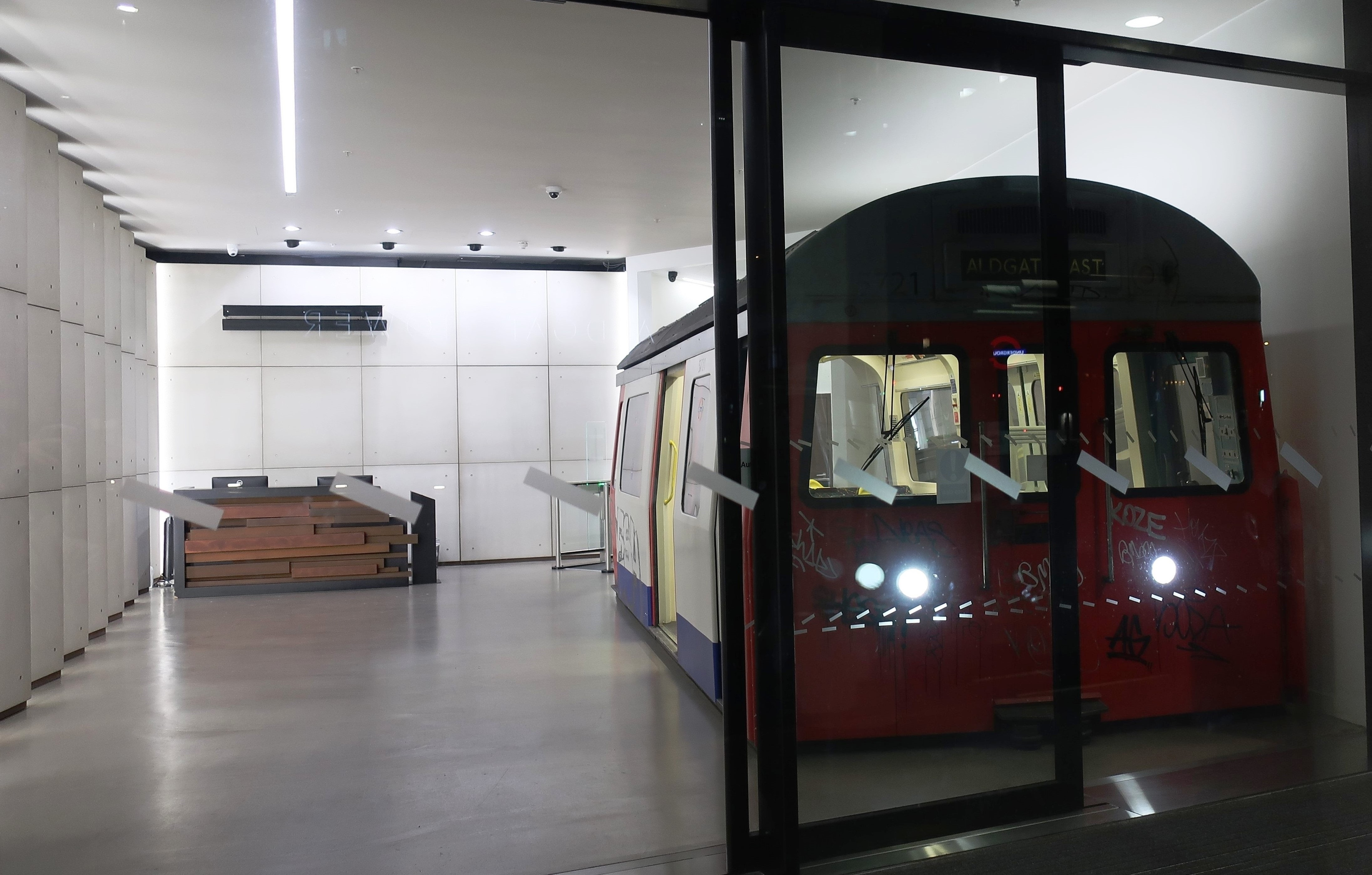
The entrance lobby in 2020

The entrance lobby was formerly notable for incorporating a section of a London Underground C Stock train, used as a seating area. It displayed "Aldgate East" as its destination. The unit bore the number 5721, which was the number of one of the final C Stock units to run on the Underground before they were withdrawn from service in 2014, but this was not its original number: the genuine 5721 is preserved at the London Transport Museum's Acton depot.

== Houblon Apartments and the "poor door" ==
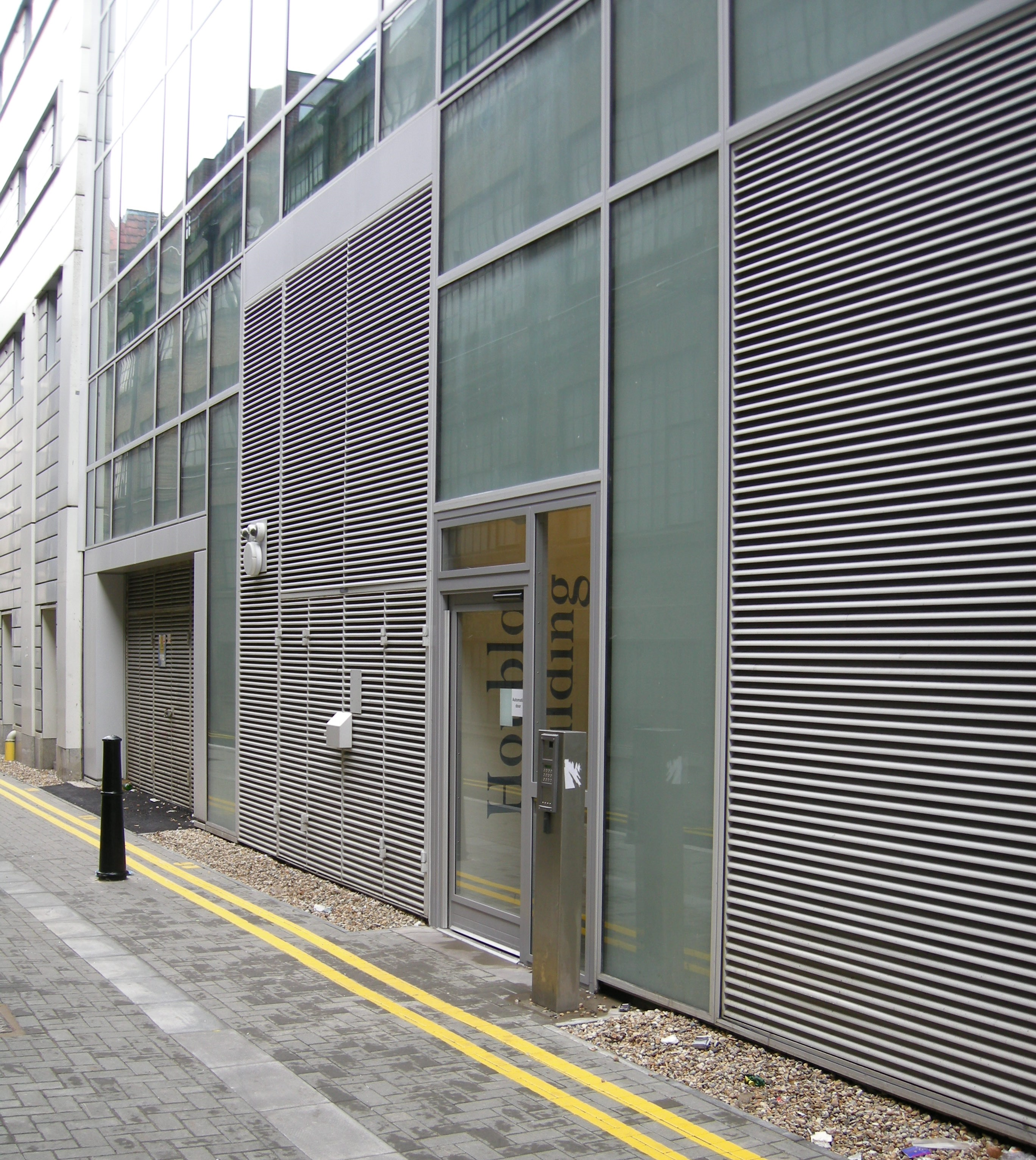
Entrance to Houblon Apartments in Tyne Street

The Relay Building includes, in compliance with planning legislation, an element of "affordable housing". This part of the development has its own name, "Houblon Apartments"; and a separate entrance, at one side of the building in Tyne Street. In July 2014, an investigation by The Guardian newspaper – commenting particularly on One Commercial Street – noted a growing trend for new housing developments in London to include separate, segregated entrances of this kind, known as "poor doors".

In November 2014, Vice reported that, "for the past 20 weeks, every Wednesday between 6PM and 7PM, a group of locals from the anarchist action group Class War have stood outside the slick glass carbuncle with a banner promising to 'devastate the avenues where the wealthy live' – a nod to a 1915 quote from firebrand Chicago anarchist Lucy Parsons." After 18 weeks, the developer Redrow disposed of the freehold of the building. A week later, a director of the new owners, Hondo Enterprises, agreed to meet with Class War, and they declared a temporary truce.

== 2022 fire incident ==
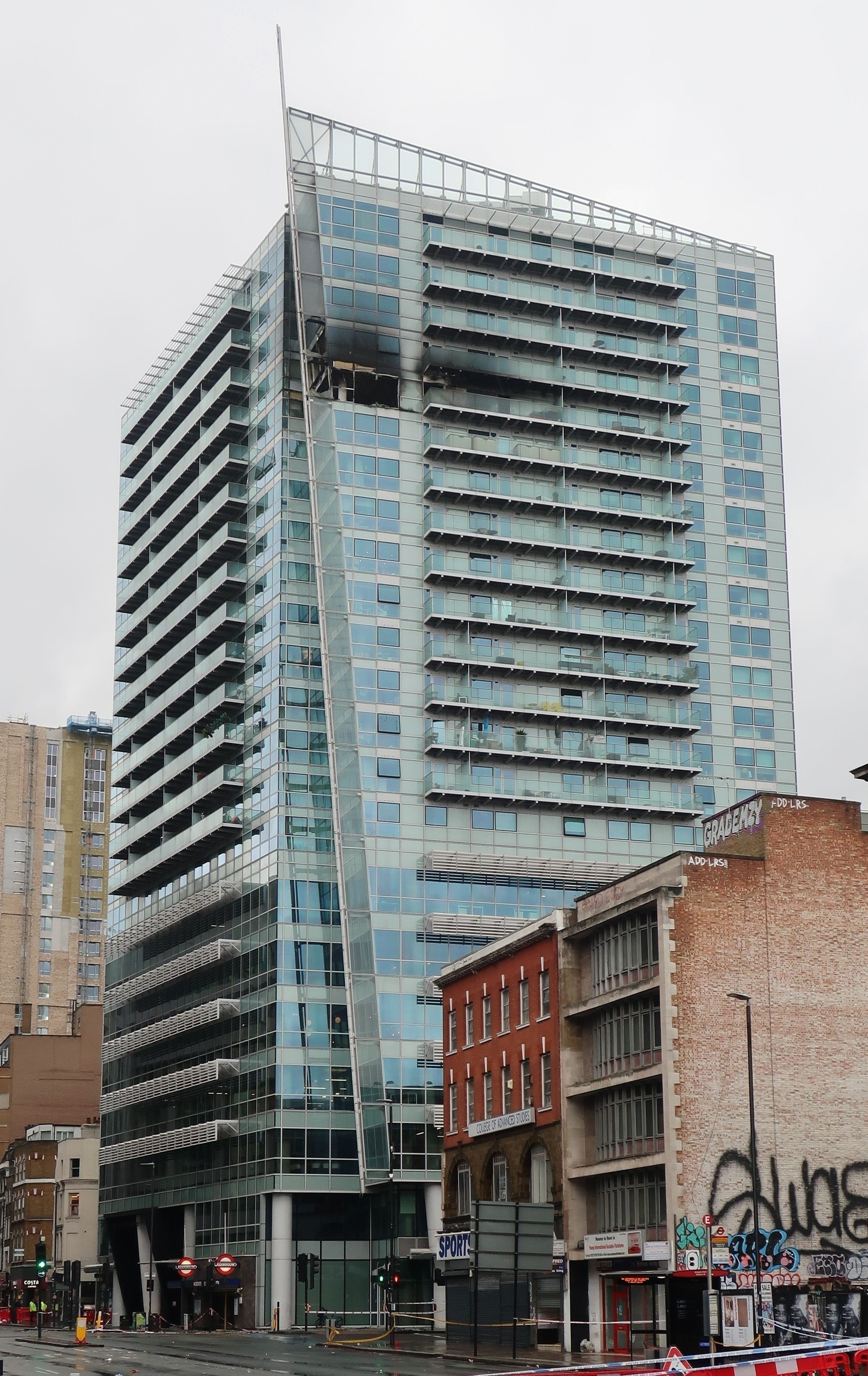
The building showing fire damage, March 2022

On 7 March 2022, a fire broke out on the 17th floor, with glass panels and other debris falling to the streets below. The London Fire Brigade was called at 3:53pm GMT and fifteen fire engines and more than 125 firefighters were sent to put out the blaze, using the tallest ladder in Europe.
