= Jackie Long =

British journalist and broadcaster

Jackie Long is a British journalist and broadcaster. She is a presenter and Social Affairs Editor at Channel 4 News.

== Background ==
Long grew up in Bedfordshire. She studied English at university and attended a journalism college in Darlington.

== Career ==
Long's career in the media began in local newspapers, where she worked for four to five years.

Prior to Channel 4 News, which she joined in 2011, Long worked for the BBC for nearly twenty years. Her career in broadcasting began at BBC Radio Bedfordshire. In the 1990s, she occasionally presented PM on BBC Radio 4 and the Midday News on BBC Radio 5 Live; in the early 2000s, she occasionally presented PM. Long was a correspondent for the BBC's Newsnight and presented a number of documentaries for the BBC. Long also worked for The World at One.

Long began presenting Channel 4 News in late 2013 or early 2014 in addition to being the programme's Social Affairs Editor, and before this was exclusively the Social Affairs Editor of the programme. In 2023, Long presented the first edition of Channel 4 News to be presented from its new Leeds studio. Long has presented many documentaries for Channel 4 and has received recognition for them. In 2012, Long presented a Channel 4 Dispatches documentary about the government's Work Capability Assessment. In 2016, Long and Lee Sorrell received Sue Lloyd-Roberts Media Award for a Channel 4 News report about Yarl's Wood detention centre. Long's documentary Inside Yarl's Wood: Britain's most notorious detention centre won the TV News award at the 2016 Amnesty International Media Awards. In 2017, a Channel 4 Dispatches documentary partly made by Long in which Bupa Care Homes were investigated undercover was shortlisted for Investigation of the Year at the British Journalism Awards.

== Personal life ==
As of 2015, Long was married to the journalist and broadcaster Matthew Amroliwala. They have five children.
