= Peter Horrocks =

British broadcast executive

Peter Horrocks CBE
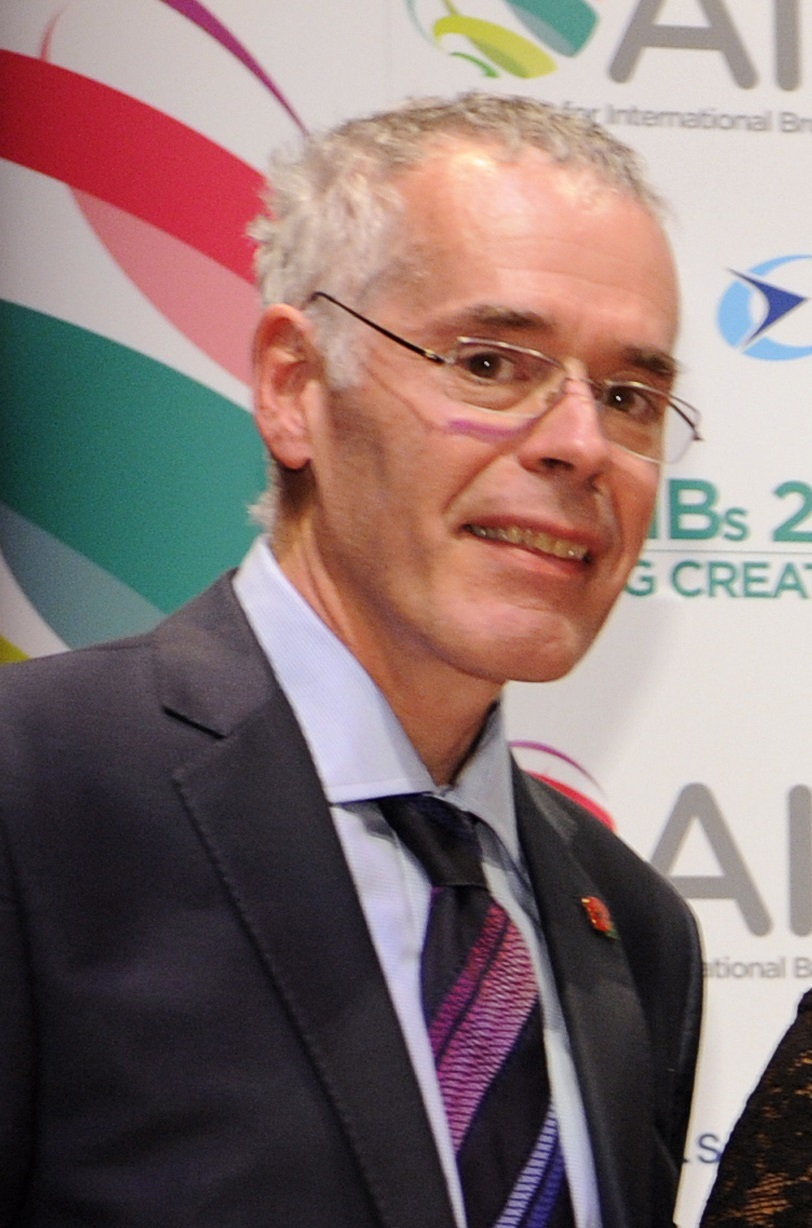
- Born: 8 October 1959 (age 66)
- Education: Christ's College, Cambridge University
- Children: 3

Peter John Gibson Horrocks CBE (born 8 October 1959) is a broadcast executive and a former Vice-Chancellor (chief executive) of The Open University. He was educated at the independent King's College School in Wimbledon and at Christ's College, Cambridge. He was previously director of the BBC World Service Group.

== BBC ==
Horrocks joined the BBC in October 1981 as a news trainee. He worked on Newsnight as an assistant producer and then producer. After time as a senior producer, intake editor and output editor on Breakfast Time, he became deputy editor of Panorama in 1988.

Horrocks edited BBC television's coverage of the 1992 general election. He edited the coverage of the Budget, by-elections and local elections, as well as the 1994 European Election results and General Election results programmes in May 1997.

In May 1992, Horrocks was appointed editor of BBC Two's social affairs programme, Public Eye, a position he held until he launched Here And Now, a current affairs magazine intended to capture high audience figures, in January 1994. He became editor of Newsnight in April 1994, and editor of Panorama in December 1997. Horrocks became Head of Current Affairs in June 2000. He was executive producer of Brits, True Spies, Smallpox 2002, The Day Britain Stopped, Dirty War and of the documentary trilogy The Power of Nightmares. Horrocks won Bafta awards in 1997 and 2005 for his editorship of Newsnight and for The Power of Nightmares.

He became Head of Television News in September 2005. In November 2007, following restructuring of BBC News, he became Head of the BBC newsroom.

In April 2009, he replaced Nigel Chapman as Head of the BBC World Service and was responsible for the overall editorial leadership and management, a post in which he remained until 2014. He is the chairman of the BBC Media Action Board of Trustees (Previously called the BBC World Service Trust).

While at the BBC he was paid a salary of £240,000 in 2013.

== The Open University ==
The Open University announced on 11 December 2014, that Horrocks had been appointed Vice-Chancellor of the University, taking over the role vacated by Martin Bean. He took up the post on 5 May 2015, and was paid £360,000 per year.

In 2018 Horrocks took part in a Parliamentary hearing on value for money in higher education, with MPs criticising the level of pay of vice-chancellors and asking them to justify their salaries. Horrocks acknowledged that the issue "potentially undermine the value of universities in this country”.

Proposals to cut £100 million from the annual budget of £420 million cutting courses by a third and significant staff redundancies were announced in March 2018. Horrocks described the changes, reducing courses by a third, as "reprioritising". Horrocks had also angered some staff by saying academics "get away with not teaching". He later issued a letter of apology and stated: "I sincerely regret that my careless language caused offence or hurt".

The following month, the OU's branch of the University and College Union (UCU) passed a vote of no confidence in Horrocks, or his plans. In response, the regional UCU called Horrocks to resign "as soon as possible". Horrocks resigned from the post of Vice-Chancellor (having to choose between it, or being fired) on 13 April 2018 "with immediate effect". He remained as a consultant to the institution for a further three months.

== Personal life ==
Horrocks is married and has three children.

Media offices
Preceded by Tim Gardam	Editor: Newsnight; 1994–1997	Succeeded by Sian Kevill
Preceded by Nigel Chapman; 2004–2009	Director, BBC World Service; 2009–2015	Succeeded by Fran Unsworth; 2015–present
