= Poor door =

Separate entrance in multi-unit housing

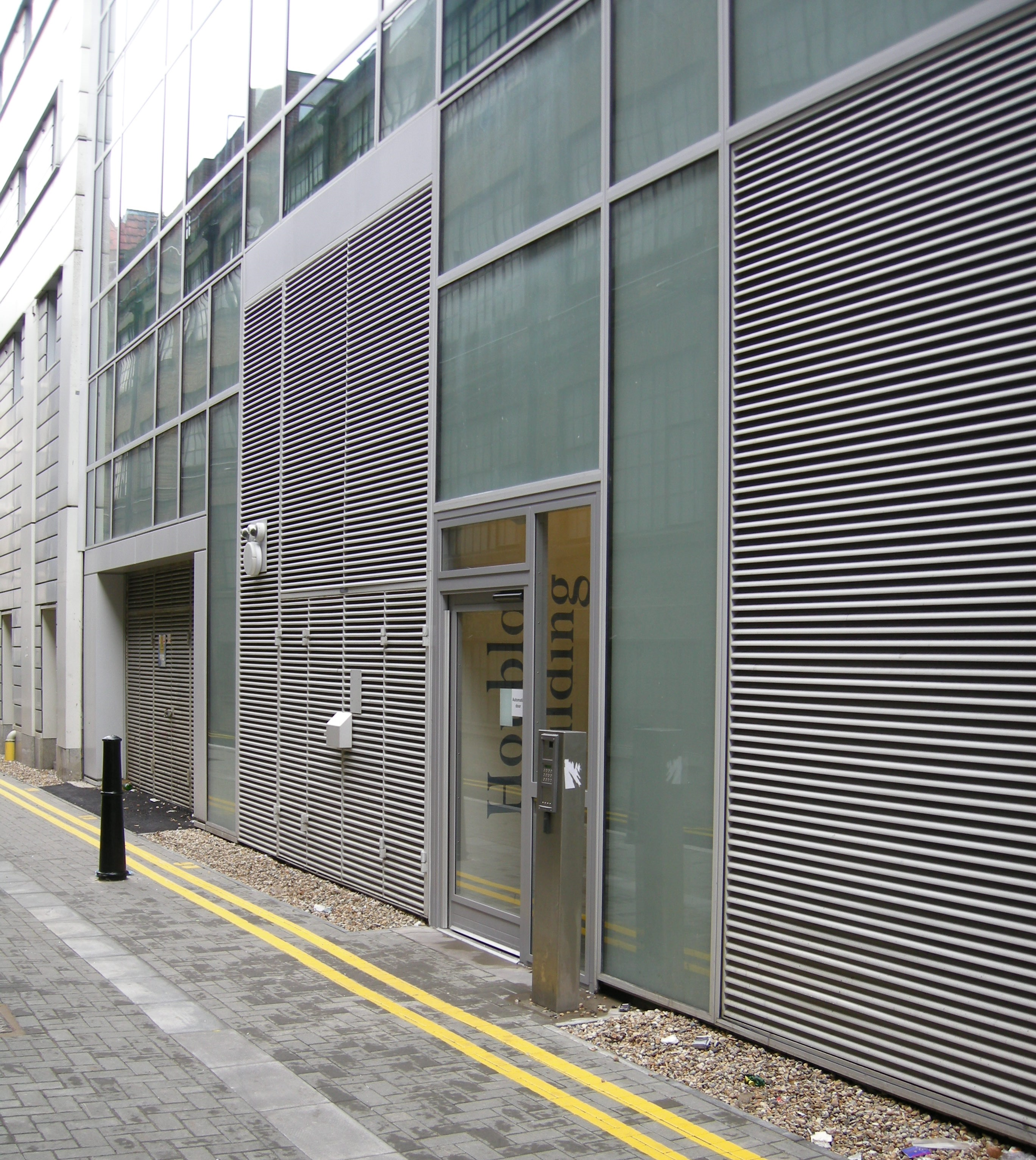
The entrance for lower-cost housing at the Relay Building in Whitechapel, London

A "poor door" is a separate entrance to a multi-unit housing development for those living in less expensive apartments.

== Description ==
The term was coined by the local news site West Side Rag in August 2013, where it was used to describe a new development on the Upper West Side of Manhattan that had separate entrances for the more-expensive market-rate and affordable-housing tenants.

While the expression "poor door" refers to separate entrances and lobbies, in practice, income-segregated buildings may also have "gyms, spas, elevators, rooftop gardens, storage areas, and playrooms" that only the high-income tenants can use. The practice, which may also include trash and mail services or parking facilities, has been criticized for segregating the rich from the poor.

Oliver Wainwright, writing in The Guardian in July 2014, presented a more nuanced view, commenting that such attempts at segregation are not new, and that there would not be the same outrage if the housing was in separate buildings, nor would social housing tenants wish to pay the high service charges needed to provide the luxurious facilities sought by wealthier tenants. He quoted Michael Edwards, senior lecturer at the Bartlett school of planning at University College London, who said: "they [poor doors] are a symptom, not the problem".

== United Kingdom (London) ==
A 2014 investigation by The Guardian noted a growing trend in London to have a separate entrance in new housing developments. Section 106 of the Town and Country Planning Act, added in 2013, requires that new blocks in many locations must include an element of "affordable housing" if they are to gain planning permission, and it has become more common for such developments to include a separate entrance for those tenants, nicknamed a "poor door".

The Mayor of London at the time, Boris Johnson, ruled out a ban on "poor doors", but said he would "discourage their use whenever possible". A campaign spokesperson for Sadiq Khan, who has proposed a poor door ban, says that affordable housing homes should sit beside private rental dwellings and homes, and there should be a "tenure blind" approach, in which a person walking through a neighbourhood should not be able to determine which housing is affordable or not based on the quality, type, or location of their doors and entrances, all with the goal of building "social equality and dignity".

=== Kensington ===
In 2017 a social housing resident called into a show on LBC radio and said that at the London building where she lived, her children could not use the communal garden built for the market-rent tenants, as it had a separate key, and the main door to the social housing was near the rubbish bins. A market-rent tenant in Kensington responded on the same show that she paid £15,500 per year for service charges in her building, so she would not be prepared to live in a building where social housing tenants got these same services for free.

=== Camden ===
Dave Hill from The Guardian states that Camden, which has its housing policy run by Labour, does not "generally seek to mix affordable and market[-priced] dwellings on the same corridors or sharing the same stairs, lifts and entrance lobbies", because the service charges and management charges for shared communal spaces can be a "significant proportion of housing costs" which may be "too high for the occupiers of affordable housing to pay". Hill states that the "wealthy and the least well-off having separate entrances into the same housing block may offend but can also be a pragmatic way of improving the supply of "affordable" homes."

=== Lambeth ===
In late March 2019, The Guardian broke the news about segregated play areas created by Henley Homes on the Lilian Baylis Old School site in Lambeth.

Henley diverged from the scheme that had been given planning approval, by erecting fixed hedges rather than gates, so children in the rented housing could look down on the central play area but not use it. They were allocated a small strip of grass on the periphery of the site. Some of the children on both side of the poor/rich divide went to the same primary school but couldn't play together. There was vociferous criticism from both owners and tenants, and the planning authority.

Politicians such as Jeremy Corbyn (Lab) and James Brokenshire (Con) condemned Henley.

The day after the story broke, Henley Homes issued a statement saying it had been a misunderstanding; all children were welcome to use the communal area including those from the social housing in Wren Mews.

== United States ==
In August 2014, The Independent noted that the "poor door" trend had spread to Washington, D.C., with an apartment complex at U and 14th Streets set to be redeveloped, with all of the social housing tenants put in a separate wing, accessed from a different street. A 28 July 2014 episode of The Colbert Report included an item about poor doors. In 2015, mayor of New York Bill de Blasio indicated that he would ban them.

The London Evening Standard reported on 29 August 2014 that the Manhattan apartment block at 40 Riverside Boulevard had been split into two with apartments costing up to $25 million facing the Hudson River and cheaper apartments let at $800 and $1,100 per month in a smaller attached building with a separate entrance. Manhattan Borough president Gale Brewer was reported to have claimed that "The two door system is an affront to New Yorkers' belief in fairness and diversity in our city." The Standard explained that the practice had become possible during the administration of former New York mayor Michael Bloomberg who had changed the city's zoning rules to allow developers to build larger buildings than normally allowed in a zone as long as they build a quantity of social housing too.

In 2013, journalist Josh Barro argued in defense of poor doors in an article in Business Insider. He calls criticisms of poor doors "absurd" and states that integrating low-income tenants into new luxury buildings via inclusionary zoning, which he says triggers builders to create poor doors, should be replaced with development fees and taxes that would enable the city to build more affordable housing at a lower-cost location. Philip Rojc, a contributing editor at Planetizen, calls the expression "poor doors" a "misleading label" in cases where a developer has built two distinct buildings and states that two doors might be the "price we pay to integrate neighborhoods" and a way to avoid the awkwardness of having well-to-do and poor families directly together; as well he says having two doors is better than continuing to locate affordable housing in "vast under-served neighborhoods".

Architect and author Michael Sorkin from Nation magazine states that the "distinction between [having] two entries...is exceedingly fine, even ridiculous", and says the two doors approach is a "byproduct of the city's inclusionary zoning law", which is designed to produce affordable housing. Sorkin says that "inclusionary zoning laws are among the few tools left to ensure the creation of affordable housing".

Matt Yglesias states that the "fury over something as superficial as a building entrance is a waste of time" and says that the "real victims" of the inclusionary zoning policy in new luxury buildings are not the families who win the housing lottery and "enjoy discount rent" in a new building downtown (albeit with a "poor door"); it is "every economically struggling New Yorker who doesn't get the discount". As well, Yglesias states that this inclusionary housing policy is only a form of tax on the rich people within new luxury buildings; rich people in houses, older condos, old lofts, and so on are not "taxed" to provide affordable housing under this system.

== Canada ==
In Vancouver's West End, a 30-floor condo will have a "poor door" for social housing residents and a regular door for the condo purchasers. The condo, which will also have separate play areas for the children of social housing tenants and condo owners and separate lobbies, led to concerns from housing officials about stigma and isolation of the lower-income residents. Owners of buildings that have two different entrances for high-income and needy tenants argue that this means that low-income residents do not have to pay for the costs of hiring a concierge in the side for affluent tenants. In April 2019, controversy over this development lead the city to study the possibility of banning poor doors.

In Toronto, both "poor door" residences are operated by Artscape, a not-for-profit real estate company. Artscape Triangle Lofts, built in 2010, is on the lower floors of a condominium in the Queen Street West area. It maintains a separate entrance for artists, with an unfinished lobby and units. The executive vice president, Celina Smith, described the separation as an "asset", separating the artists from their neighbours. For the Artscape Bayside Lofts, built in 2019, artists will use a separate entrance and will not have access to the building's facilities, including the pool. The subsidized units are owned by the City of Toronto, and managed by Artscape. The lobby and units are finished separately at lower cost by the city.

== See also ==
- Class discrimination
- Social class in the United Kingdom
