= Channel 4 News =

British television news service

- Logo used since 2015
- Presented by: Krishnan Guru-Murthy; Matt Frei; Jackie Long; Ciaran Jenkins
- Country of origin: United Kingdom
- Original language: English

Production
- Running time: 55 minutes (Monday–Friday); 20–30 minutes (Saturday–Sunday)
- Production company: ITN

Original release
- Network: Channel 4
- Release: 2 November 1982 – present

Related
- More4 News (defunct)

Channel 4 News is a British television news programme broadcast on Channel 4 and produced by ITN. It has been broadcasting since Channel 4 launched on 2 November 1982. For almost forty years, the programme had only two lead presenters: Peter Sissons (1982—1989), and Jon Snow (1989—2021).

== Current productions ==
=== Channel 4 News ===
Channel 4 News is the name of Channel 4's main evening news programme.

The editor is Esme Wren, appointed in 2022. The programme is presented by Krishnan Guru-Murthy, Matt Frei, Jackie Long and Ciaran Jenkins and is on the air Monday to Friday from 19:00 to 19:55, (Weather from around 19:55), and at variable times at weekends and bank holidays. Alex Thomson is the chief correspondent.

Channel 4 News has been on air since the channel launched in 1982. The channel wanted its news to be very different from what was on offer elsewhere on UK television. As Channel 4's commissioner for news, Liz Forgan, put it, she wanted: "no sport, no royal stories, no plane crashes and lashings of foreign news."

This was a problem for ITN, which had won the contract to produce the programme, and which specialised in exactly the kind of fast-moving tabloid-style bulletins Forgan did not want. A new team was put together to produce the show. At Channel 4's insistence, the editor, Derrik Mercer, was brought in from outside ITN, as were many of the staff. Mercer was a distinguished newspaperman but he had never worked in broadcasting. When the new show went on air there were many problems. The lead presenter, Peter Sissons, later described it as "an unmitigated disaster."

But, gradually, the team worked out production solutions. Mercer left the show. He was replaced by a senior ITN executive, Paul McKee; and then by a very experienced ITN journalist Stewart Purvis. The ratings began to pick up. The show found its feet during the year-long UK miners' strike that started in 1984. By the time the strike ended, Channel 4 News had established itself as a force to be reckoned with. It started to win awards—the first was an award from the Broadcasting Press Guild, which in 1985 named the show the Best News or Current Affairs Programme of 1984; and in 1987 it won its first BAFTA for the Best News or Outside Broadcast of 1986.

Channel 4 News went on to win many more awards, including, in 2006, a record five Royal Television Society Television awards. These included TV Journalist of the Year for Jon Snow; the Home News Award; and the International News Award.

It won the News Coverage British Academy Television Award in 2004 and the 2004 International Emmy for the best news programme produced and aired outside the United States. Jon Snow won the Richard Dimbleby British Academy Television Award in 2005 for outstanding contribution to the world of news and current affairs.

In November 2011, Liam Dutton became Channel 4's first ever weather presenter, joining from BBC Weather.

The exposé of Cambridge Analytica in conjunction with The Guardian and The New York Times which aired in 2018 won a Peabody Award.

In April 2021, Channel 4 and ITN announced that Snow would leave the programme after 32 years. His last show was on 23 December 2021.

=== Channel 4 News Summary ===
A replacement for the Channel 4 News at Noon in the 12:00 slot, it first aired on 21 December 2009, giving a five-minute summary of the news.

== Former productions ==
=== Channel Four News at Noon ===
Channel Four News at Noon was first introduced in 2003 for the duration of the Iraq War, and due to its instant success, it was kept on in Channel 4's daytime schedule (except when live horse racing was being broadcast). It was presented by Krishnan Guru-Murthy. Prior to this bulletin, the programme in the slot was Powerhouse, a political news programme, also produced for Channel 4 by ITN. As a consequence of the advertising slowdown during the 2009 recession, the programme was cancelled, along with More4 News, and replaced with the five-minute Channel 4 News Summary, the last broadcast airing on 18 December 2009.

=== More4 News ===
Aired Monday to Friday on sister channel More4, More4 News was anchored by Sarah Smith then later Kylie Morris, it ran for 30 minutes, aiming to go in-depth into a certain issue. As a consequence of the advertising slowdown during the 2009 recession, the programme was cancelled, along with the Channel Four News at Noon, the last broadcast airing on 18 December 2009.

== On-air team ==
Attributed to the following source:

=== Presenters ===
- Krishnan Guru-Murthy (1998–present, Lead presenter 2022–present)
- Matt Frei (2011–present), Jackie Long (2015–present) and Ciaran Jenkins (2021-present), also present during the week alongside their reporting roles.
- Other members of the team occasionally present throughout the week and during weekend and bank holiday broadcasts including Ayshah Tull, Keme Nzerem and Alex Thomson.

=== Editors, correspondents and reporters ===
Editors

- Eleanor Goodman, political editor 1988–2005
- Matt Frei (Europe editor)
- Jackie Long (social affairs editor)
- Gary Gibbon (political editor)
- Lindsey Hilsum (international editor)
- Siobhan Kennedy (technology and science editor)
- Victoria Macdonald (health and social care editor)
- Helia Ebrahimi (economics editor)
- Darshna Soni (communities editor)
- Anushka Asthana (US editor)

Correspondents

- Alex Thomson (chief correspondent)
- Paul McNamara (senior political correspondent)
- Ciaran Jenkins (data correspondent)
- Andy Davies (home affairs correspondent)
- Paraic O'Brien (foreign affairs correspondent)
- Secunder Kermani (foreign affairs correspondent)
- Kathryn Samson (Scotland correspondent)
- Clare Fallon (North of England correspondent)
- Symeon Brown (home affairs correspondent)
- Ayshah Tull (news correspondent)
- Jamal Osman (Africa correspondent)
- Minnie Stephenson (culture correspondent)
- Guillermo Galdos (Latin America correspondent)
- Ruben Reuter (disability correspondent)
- Keme Nzerem (correspondent)
- Kiran Moodley (correspondent)
- Anja Popp (correspondent)
- Emily Wither (correspondent)
- Harry Fawcett (correspondent)

Reporters

- Jordan Jarrett-Bryan (sports reporter)
- Andrew Misra (reporter)
- Frances Read (reporter)
- Amelia Jenne (reporter)

Weather presenter

- Liam Dutton (weather presenter)

=== Former presenters ===
- Sarah Hogg (1982–85)
- Trevor McDonald (1982–89)
- Gavin Scott (1982–86)
- Peter Sissons (lead presenter 1982–89)
- John Suchet (1982–1992)
- Sandy Gall (1983–84)
- Alastair Stewart (1983–87)
- Sue Turton (1983–2010)
- Carol Barnes (1984–92)
- Sonia Ruseler (1984–92)
- Nicholas Owen (1985–91)
- Sue Carpenter (1988–90)
- Zeinab Badawi (1989–98)
- Jon Snow (lead presenter 1989–2021)
- Fiona Armstrong (1990–91)
- Dermot Murnaghan (1989–95)
- Alex Thomson (1999–2004)
- Samira Ahmed (2000–11)
- Katie Razzall (2005–2015)
- Sheena McDonald
- Fatima Manji (2016–2024)
- Cathy Newman (2011–2026)

=== Design team ===
Years	Name	Title
2007–	Sam Wapples	Head of Graphics
1989–94	Jonathan Spencer	Graphic Designer
1994–	Fabrizio Viani	Senior Designer
1997–	Mike Smith	Senior Designer
1998–	Ian Watkins	Deputy Head of Graphics
2005–	Sue Kearley-Schon	Senior Designer
2012–	Kevin O'Dell	Senior Designer

== Non-broadcast media ==
Channel 4 News also produces a variety of non-broadcast media, including a range of journalist authored blogs to deliver insight and analysis of the news from the news team. Channel 4 News also produces Snowmail, a free daily email from the news reporter team, giving their personal take on the day's news agenda and behind-the-scenes newsroom goings-on.

== Historical roles ==
In 2003, Channel 4 News broke the story of the Dodgy Dossier which led to a political crisis in Britain.

The story of the Conservative Party's election expenses scandal was first broken, and then pursued for over a year, by Michael Crick.

In March 2018, an undercover investigation by Channel 4 News explored the campaign activities of Cambridge Analytica.

== Retractions and Ofcom criticism ==
On the evening of the 2017 Westminster attack, Channel 4 News claimed they were able to name the dead attacker as Abu Izzadeen, also known as Trevor Brooks. The claim was repeated by The Independent and the Daily Mirror. However, Channel 4 News was forced to issue an on-air retraction during the same bulletin after Izzadeen's solicitor stated that he was alive and serving time in prison.

== Theme music ==
The music in the Channel 4 News titles is an orchestration of "Best Endeavours" by Alan Hawkshaw. It was introduced a few months after the channel's launch, and has remained in use since its inception. It was originally a library piece and as such has appeared in other works, such as the trailer for the Clint Eastwood film Pale Rider.
