= British Academy Television Award for Best Single Documentary =

Annual UK television award

British Academy Television Award
- Country: United Kingdom
- Presented by: British Academy of Film and Television Arts
- First award: 1964
- Currently held by: Ukraine: Enemy in the Woods (2025)
- Website: http://www.bafta.org/

The British Academy Television Award for Best Single Documentary is one of the major categories of the British Academy Television Awards (BAFTAs), the primary awards ceremony of the British television industry. According to the BAFTA website, the category is "for one-off documentaries only. Includes individual episodes of documentary strands."

The category has gone through some name changes since its inception:

- It was first awarded as an individual recognition from 1964 to 1970.
- From 1978 to 1983 it was presented as Best Documentary.
- From 1984 to 2006 it was presented as Flaherty Documentary Award or Robert Flaherty Documentary Award, also from 1984 to 1990, documentaries that used to compete for the BAFTA Award for Best Documentary competed in this category instead.
- Since 2007 it has been presented as Best Single Documentary.

== Winners and nominees ==
=== 1960s ===
Year	Recipient(s)	Title
1964	Anthony de Lotbinière	
1965	Jack Gold	
1966	Charles Squires	The Grafters; Paradise Street
1966	Peter Batty	The Fall and Rise of the House of Krupp; The Road to Suez
1966	Richard Cawston	Born Chinese
1966	Anthony de Lotbinière	Eton: The Pacemakers
1966	Denis Mitchell	Sharon; The Entertainers; The Dream Machine
1966	Michael Tuchner	A Little Madness; No Mean City: Florence; No Mean City: Athens; Pilgrims to Lourdes
1967	Kevin Billington	
1968	Kevin Billington	
1969	Michael Darlow, Mike Wooller	Cities at War

=== 1970s ===
Best Factual Documentary

Year	Title	Recipient(s)
1970	A Year in the Life	Paul Watson
1970	The Life And Times of Lord Mountbatten	Peter Morley
1970	The Royal Family	Richard Cawston
1970	Struggle For China; The Gold Run; Captain RN; It Never Seemed To Rain; All Or Nothing Man; Papa Doc; The Pugnacious Pacifist; Whicker's New World	Tony Essex

Best Documentary

Year	Title	Recipient(s)
1978	Hospital: Casualty	Tim King
1978	Goodbye Longfellow Road	John Willis
1978	Whicker's World - "Palm Beach"	Michael Tuchner
1978	World in Action: The Life and Death of Steve Biko	Michael Ryan
1979	Opium: The Warlords	Adrian Cowell
1979	The Hong Kong Beat: The Bamboo Curtain	John Purdie
1979	MacMillan's Mayerling	Derek Bailey
1979	Whicker's World - "India: He's A Stuck-Up Maharajah - I'm Not Going To Marry Him"	Ian Mcfarlane, Nigel Turner
1979	Nuts and Bolts	Allan Segal

=== 1980s ===
Year	Title	Recipient(s)
1980	Fred Dibnah: Steeplejack	Don Haworth
1980	The World About Us: Bloody Ivory (Special)	Simon Trevor, Bill Travers
1980	Kitty - Return To Auschwitz	Peter Morley
1980	Year Zero: The Silent Death of Cambodia	David Munro
1980	Made In Korea	Allan Segal
1981	Strangeways: Christmas	Rex Bloomstein
1981	Cambodia - Year One	David Munro
1981	Great Railway Journeys of the World (for "Deccan")	Gerry Troyna
1981	The South Bank Show: A Time There Was… A Profile Of Benjamin Britten	Tony Palmer
1981	The World About Us - "Osprey"	Hugh Miles
1982	The Ritz	Edward Mirzoeff
1982	The South Bank Show: Nickleby and Company	Andrew Snell
1982	Prostitute I Am, Common I'm Not	Judy Lever
1982	Snowdon on Camera	Iain Johnstone
1983	Laurence Olivier - A Life	Melvyn Bragg, Bob Bee
1983	A Complaint of Rape	Roger Graef, Charles Stewart
1983	Ice, Wind and Fire	Michael Andrews
1983	The Orson Welles Story	Alan Yentob, Leslie Megahey

Flaherty Documentary Award

Year	Title	Recipient(s)
1984	Schindler	Jon Blair
1984	Forty Minutes - "Female Circumcision"	Louise Panton
1984	The Visit - "Part 3: The Boy David"	Alex McCall
1984	Wildlife on One - "Night Life"	Dilys Breese
1985	28 Up	Michael Apted
1985	The South Bank Show: Alan Bennett	David Hinton
1985	Afghanistan Reports: Allah Against the Gunships	Sandy Gall
1985	GI Brides	Lavinia Warner
1986	Omnibus: Leonard Berstein's West Side Story	Christopher Swann
1986	David Lean: A Life in Film	Nigel Wattis
1986	Marilyn Monroe: Say Goodbye to the President	Christopher Olgiati
1986	The Frozen Ocean - "Part 1 - Kingdom of The Ice Bear"	Mike Salisbury, Hugh Miles
1987	Shoah	Claude Lanzmann
1987	British Cinema: Personal View - A Turnip Head's Guide to the British Cinema	Alan Parker
1987	Equinox - "Prisoner of Consciousness"	John Dollar
1987	Forty Minutes - "The Fishing Party"	Paul Watson
1987	Omnibus - "The Mission"	Robin Lough
1987	Viewpoint '86: Afghanistan: The Agony Of A Nation	Sandy Gall
1988	Baka - People of the Rain Forest	Phil Agland
1988	Forty Minutes - "Home From The Hill"	Molly Dineen
1988	Fourteen Days in May	Paul Hamann
1988	Man-Eating Tigers, Saving The Tiger	Naresh Bedi
1989	This Week - "Death on the Rock"	Chris Oxley
1989	The Duty Men: East Enders	Paul Hamann
1989	In From The Cold: A Portrait of Richard Burton	Tony Palmer
1989	Viewpoint Special: The Men Who Killed Kennedy	Nigel Turner

=== 1990s ===
Year	Title	Recipient(s)
1990	First Tuesday - "Four Hours in My Lai"	Kevin Sim
1990	Everyman - "Romania - State of Fear"	John Blake
1990	Lost Children of The Empire	Joanna Mack, Mike Fox
1990	Viewpoint '89: Cambodia - Year 10: A Special Report by John Pilger	David Munro
1991	The Last African Flying Boat	David Wallace
1991	Harold Lloyd - The Third Genius	Kevin Brownlow, David Gill
1991	Viewpoint: Cambodia, The Betrayal - A Special Report by John Pilger	David Munro
1991	Viewpoint: Ceausescu's Children	Patricia Ingram
1992	35 Up	Michael Apted
1992	World in Action - "Special: The Birmingham Six - Their Own Story"	Ian McBride, Charles Trernayne, Eamon O’Connor
1992	Viewpoint '91: Hellfighters of Kuwait	Mike Rossiter
1992	True Stories - "The Leader, His Driver and the Driver's Wife"	Nick Broomfield
1993	Video Diaries: The Man Who Loves Gary Lineker	Bob Long, Dr Yili Hasani
1993	Cutting Edge - "Tornado Down"	Adam Bullmore, Tom Roberts
1993	First Tuesday - "Katie and Eilish - Siamese Twins"	Mark Galloway
1993	Inside Story: Bag Lady	David Pearson
1994	Timewatch - "The Mysterious Career Of Lee Harvey Oswald"	William Cran
1994	True Stories: The Unforgiving	Clive Gordon
1994	Viewpoint '93: Saddam's Killing Fields	Rebecca Dobbs, Christopher Jeans
1994	Sarajevo Diary	Neil Bell, Dom Rotheroe, Karl Schonfeld
1995	Inside Story: Silent Twin - Without My Shadow	Olivia Lichtenstein
1995	Cutting Edge - "The Club"	Frances Berrigan, Brian Hill, Kate Woods
1995	Torvill and Dean: Facing the Music	Edward Mirzoeff
1995	25 Bloody Years: The Dead	Peter Dale
1996	True Stories: The Betrayed	Clive Gordon
1996	Anne Frank Remembered	Jon Blair
1996	Network First: Man and Animal	Anthony Thomas
1996	Secret Asia: The Dying Rooms	Brian Woods, Kate Blewett
1997	Horizon - "Fermat's Last Theorem"	John Lynch, Simon Singh
1997	Cutting Edge - "The Home"	Paul Watson
1997	Elton John: Tantrums & Tiaras	Polly Steele, Claudia Rosencrantz, David Furnish
1997	Timewatch - "Remember Aberfan"	Catrine Clay
1998	True Stories: The Grave	Belinda Giles
1998	Inside Story: Nazi Gold	Christopher Olgiati
1998	Network First: Out of the Shadows/We Are The Treasury	Ross Wilson
1998	Wildlife Special: Polar Bear	Martha Holmes
1999	After Lockerbie	Ross Wilson
1999	42 Up	Michael Apted, Claire Lewis
1999	Horizon - "Mir Mortals"	Jill Fullerton-Smith
1999	Inside Story: Tongue Tied	Olivia Lichtenstein

=== 2000s ===
Year	Title	Recipient(s)	Broadcaster
2000	True Stories: Divorce Iranian Style	Kim Longinotto, Ziba Mir-Hosseini	Channel 4
2000	Gulag	Angus Macqueen	BBC Two
2000	True Stories: Kosovo - The Valley	Dan Reed	Channel 4
2000	Malcolm and Barbara - A Love Story	Paul Watson, Kim Horton	ITV
2001	True Stories: 100% White	Leo Regan	Channel 4
2001	The Boy David - The Return	Desmond Wilcox, Alex McCall	BBC One
2001	Endurance: Shackleton and the Antarctic	George Butler, Caroline Alexander, Jeremy Evans	Channel 4
2001	The Man Who Bought Mustique	Joseph Bullman, Vikram Jayanti	Channel 4
2002	Kelly and Her Sisters	Marilyn Gaunt	ITV
2002	True Stories: Battlecentre	Leo Regan, Roy Ackerman, Paul Van Dyck	Channel 4
2002	Ellen MacArthur: Sailing Through Heaven and Hell	Steve Robinson, Ellen MacArthur	BBC One
2002	When Louis Met The Hamiltons	David Mortimer, Gabe Solomon, Will Yapp, Louis Theroux	BBC One
2003	Feltham Sings	Roger Graef, Brian Hill	Channel 4
2003	9/11: The Tale of Two Towers	Michael Attwell	Five
2003	SAS Embassy Siege		BBC Two
2003	Thalidomide - Life at 40	Benetta Adamson	BBC Two
2004	One Life: Lager, Mum and Me	Todd Austin, Min Clough	BBC One
2004	My Family and Autism	Jenny Abbott, Fran Landsman	BBC Two
2004	Pompeii: The Last Day	Michael J. Mosley, Peter Nicholson, Ailsa Orr	BBC One
2004	Real Life: Being Terri	James Allen, Andrea Cornes, Ron Trickett	ITV
2005	The Orphans of Nkandla		BBC Four
2005	The Boy Whose Skin Fell Off	Patrick Collerton	Channel 4
2005	The F***ing Fulfords		Channel 4
2005	The Brighton Bomb		BBC One
2006	Make Me Normal	Brian Hill, Zac Beattie, Jonathan Smith	Channel 4
2006	Children Of Beslan		BBC Two
2006	Taxidermy: Stuff The World	Brian Hill, Elodie Gornall, Morgan Matthews	BBC Two
2006	The Real Sex Traffic	Simcha Jacobovici, Brian Woods, Ric Esther Bienstock	Channel 4

Best Single Documentary

Year	Title	Recipient(s)	Broadcaster
2007	Evicted	Brian Woods, Deborah Shipley, Jeremy Wales, Katy Sheppard	BBC One
2007	Breaking Up With The Joneses	Ursula Macfarlane, Saskia Wilson, Dave Nath, Gregor Lyon	Channel 4
2007	9/11: The Falling Man	Henry Singer, John Smithson, Sue Bourne, Julian Ware	Channel 4
2007	Rain in My Heart	Paul Watson	BBC Two
2008	Lie of the Land	Molly Dineen, Justin Krish, Catherine Bailey, Mark Frith	Channel 4
2008	Beautiful Young Minds	Morgan Matthews, Edmund Coulthard, Grant McKee, David Brindley	BBC Two
2008	Malcolm and Barbara: Love's Farewell	Paul Watson, Kim Horton	ITV
2008	Parallel Worlds, Parallel Lives		BBC Four
2009	True Stories: Chosen	Brian Woods, Caroline Haydon, Chris Eley, Jimmy Edmonds	Channel 4
2009	The Fallen	Morgan Matthews, Elodie Gornall, Joby Gee, David Brindley	BBC Two
2009	A Boy Called Alex		Channel 4
2009	Thriller in Manila	John Dower, John Smithson, Elinor Day, Andrew MacKenzie	More4

=== 2010s ===
Year	Title	Recipient(s)	Broadcaster
2010	Wounded	Sara Hardy, Jane Aldous, Gwyn Jones, Roger Courtiour	BBC One
2010	Katie: My Beautiful Face	Jessie Versluys, Dan Goldsack, Kate Collier, Samuel Santana	Channel 4
2010	Tsunami: Caught on Camera	Tom Brisley, Janice Sutherland, Sarah Swingler, Alex Kiehl	Channel 4
2010	Louis Theroux: A Place for Paedophiles	Louis Theroux, Emma Cooper, Guy King, Nick Mirsky	BBC Two
2011	Between Life and Death	Nick Holt, Meredith Chambers, Marina Parker, Ben Brown	BBC One
2011	The Dancing Boys of Afghanistan	Jamie Doran, Najibullah Quraishi, John Moffat, Mike Healy	More4
2011	Pink Saris	Kim Longinotto, Girjashanker Vahra, Amber Latif, Ed Stobart	More4
2011	Scenes from a Teenage Killing	Morgan Matthews, Ruth Kelly, Steve Hewlett, Michael Harrowes	BBC Four
2012	Terry Pratchett: Choosing to Die	Craig Hunter, Charlie Russell, Gary Scott, Terry Pratchett	BBC Two
2012	Cutting Edge - "We Need to Talk about Dad"	Peter Dale, Elizabeth Stopford	Channel 4
2012	The Fight of Their Lives	Gabriel Clarke, John McKenna	ITV
2012	9/11: The Day That Changed the World	Kate Botting, Brian Lapping, Talya Tibbon, Leslie Woodhead	ITV
2013	7/7: One Day in London	Ben Anthony, Sarah Hamilton, Rupert Houseman, Morgan Matthews	BBC Two
2013	Baka: A Cry from the Rainforest	Phil Agland	BBC Two
2013	Lucian Freud: Painted Life	Randall Wright, Denys Blakeway, Paul Binns, Patrick Duval	BBC Two
2013	Nina Conti – A Ventriloquist’s Story: Her Master’s Voice	Nina Conti, Riaz Meer, Michael O’Kelly, Tim Jordan	BBC Four
2014	The Murder Trial	Nick Holt, Marina Parker, Kate Barker, Ben Brown	Channel 4
2014	The Unspeakable Crime: Rape	Sara Hardy, Blue Ryan, Emma Hindley, Gwyn Jones	BBC One
2014	28 Up South Africa	Angus Gibson, Jemma Jupp, Jonathan Levi	ITV
2014	The Day Kennedy Died	Leslie Woodhead, Lorraine McKechnie, Sue Summers	ITV
2015	The Paedophile Hunter	Dan Reed, Mark Towns, Tom Costello	Channel 4
2015	Baby P: The Untold Story	Henry Singer, Jenny Saunders, Ben Stark, Simon Ford	BBC One
2015	Children of Syria	Robin Barnwell, Lyse Doucet, Bradley Manning, Lucy Hetherington	BBC Two
2015	The Miners Strike and Me		ITV
2016	My Son the Jihadi	Peter Beard, Richard Kerbaj, Simon MacMahon, Brian Woods	Channel 4
2016	Louis Theroux: Transgender Kids		BBC Two
2016	Bitter Lake		BBC iPlayer
2016	Life After Suicide	Angela Samata, Leo Burley, Jenny Williams, Fergus O’Brien	BBC One
2017	Hillsborough		BBC Two
2017	Behind Closed Doors	Anna Hall, Erica Gornall, Paddy Garrick, Brian Woods	BBC One
2017	How to Die: Simon's Choice	Rowan Deacon, Lizzie Kempton, Colin Barr, Ben Brown	BBC Two
2017	HyperNormalisation	Adam Curtis, Sandra Gorel, Victoria Jaye	BBC iPlayer
2018	Rio Ferdinand: Being Mum and Dad	Rio Ferdinand, Grant Best, Matt Smith, Martin Thompson	BBC One
2018	Chris Packham: Asperger's and Me	Charlie Russell, Lizzie Kempton, Tom Barry, Will Grayburn	BBC Two
2018	Louis Theroux, Talking to Anorexia	Louis Theroux, Ellena Wood, Simon McMahon, Peter Dale	BBC Two
2018	One Deadly Weekend in America	Sanjay Singhal, Ursula Macfarlane, Jon Alwen, Sarah Hunt	BBC Three
2019	Gun No. 6	James Newton, Zac Beattie, Georgina Cammalleri, Rupert Houseman	BBC Two
2019	Driven: The Billy Monger Story	Caroline Hawkins, Charlie Russell, Will Grayburn, Charlie Corbett	BBC Three
2019	My Dad, The Peace Deal and Me	Leo Burley, Patrick Kielty, Richard Bond, Paula Nightingale	BBC One
2019	School for Stammerers	Jill Worsley, Rachel Bloomfield	ITV

=== 2020s ===
Year	Title	Recipient(s)	Broadcaster
2020	The Last Survivors		BBC Two
2020	The Abused	Barbie MacLaurin, Napoleon Stratogiannakis, Malcolm Brinkworth, Benedict Adams	Channel 5
2020	David Harewood: Psychosis and Me	Emma Hindley, Wendie Ottewill, Olivia Isaacs, David Harewood	BBC Two
2020	The Family Secret	Anna Hall, Sally Ogden, Luke Rothery, Brian Woods	Channel 4
2021	Locked In: Breaking the Silence (Storyville)	Xavier Alford, Colette Hodges, Sacha Mirzoeff, Poppy Goodheart	BBC Four
2021	American Murder: The Family Next Door	Jenny Popplewell, James Marsh, Jonathan Stadlen, Simon Barker	Netflix
2021	Anton Ferdinand: Football, Racism & Me	Sian Guerra, Jeremy Lee, Wendie Ottewill, James Ross	BBC One
2021	Surviving COVID		Channel 4
2022	My Childhood, My Country - 20 Years in Afghanistan	Phil Grabsky, Shoaib Sharifi, Amanda Wilkie, Clive Mattock	ITV
2022	9/11: Inside the President's War Room	Adam Wishart, Neil Grant, Serena Kennedy, Simon Finch	Apple TV+/BBC One
2022	Greenfell: The Untold Story	James Newton, Daisy Ayliffe, Emma Lysaght, Kirsty Cunningham, Jessie Versluys	Channel 4
2022	Nail Bomber: Manhunt		Netflix
2023	The Real Mo Farah	Leo Burley, Hannah Richards, Rick Barker, Marvyn Benoit, Shona Thompson, Zad Rogers	BBC One
2023	Chernobyl: The Lost Tapes	James Jones, Darren Kemp, Rupert Houseman, Serhiy Solodko, Joanna Marshall, Sasha Odynova	Sky Documentaries
2023	Escape from Kabul Airport	Jamie Roberts, William Grayburn, Dan Reed	BBC Two
2023	Our Falklands War (Frontline)	Guy King, Saskia Rusher, Simon McMahon, Zac Beattie, Guy Meachin, Libby Taylor	BBC Two
2024	Ellie Simmonds: Finding My Secret Family	Jasleen Sethi, David Thompson, Colleen Flynn, Kathryn Jein, Nick Underhill	ITV1
2024	David Holmes: The Boy Who Lived	Dan Hartley, Kevin Konak, Simon Chinn, Jonathan Chinn, Vanessa Davies, Amy Stares	Sky Documentaries
2024	Hatton	Daniel Dewsbury, Paul Yoshida, Sam Bergson, Ian Davies, John McKenna	Sky Documentaries
2024	Vjeran Tomic: The Spider-Man of Paris	Jamie Roberts, Dan Reed	Netflix
2025	Ukraine: Enemy in the Woods	Jamie Roberts, Kate Spankie, Jonathan Smith, Claire Walker, Stanislav Strilets	BBC Two
2025	Tell Them You Love Me		Sky Documentaries
2025	Hell Jumper	Paddy Wivell, Adriana Timco, Colin Barr, Rupert Houseman, Jane Nicholson, Clancie John-Pierre	BBC Two
2025	Undercover: Exposing the Far Right		Channel 4
2026	Grenfell: Uncovered	Olaide Sadiq, Samuel R. Santana, Sandy Smith, James Rogan, Emma Scott, James Saville	Netflix
2026	Louis Theroux: The Settlers	Louis Theroux, Arron Fellows, Joshua Baker, Sara Obeidat, Matan Cohen, Fiona Stourton	BBC Two
2026	One Day in Southport	Dan Reed, Bruce Law, James Parris	Channel 4
2026	Unforgotten: The Bradford City Fire	Andy Warboys, George Grafton, Jaimie D'Cruz, Luke Flight, Miriam Walsh, Oliver Schofield	BBC Two

- Note: The series that don't have recipients on the tables had Production team credited as recipients for the award or nomination.
