= Alan Segal =

Alan, Allan, or Allen Segal, Siegal, or Siegel may refer to:

- Abe Segal (Alan Abraham Segal, 1930–2016), South African tennis player
- Allan Segal (1941–2012), British documentary film maker
- Alan F. Segal (1945–2011), American scholar of ancient religions
- Allan M. Siegal (1940–2022), American journalist
- Alan Siegel (born 1938), American businessman
