= Rio Ferdinand =

English former footballer and pundit (born 1978)

Rio Ferdinand OBE
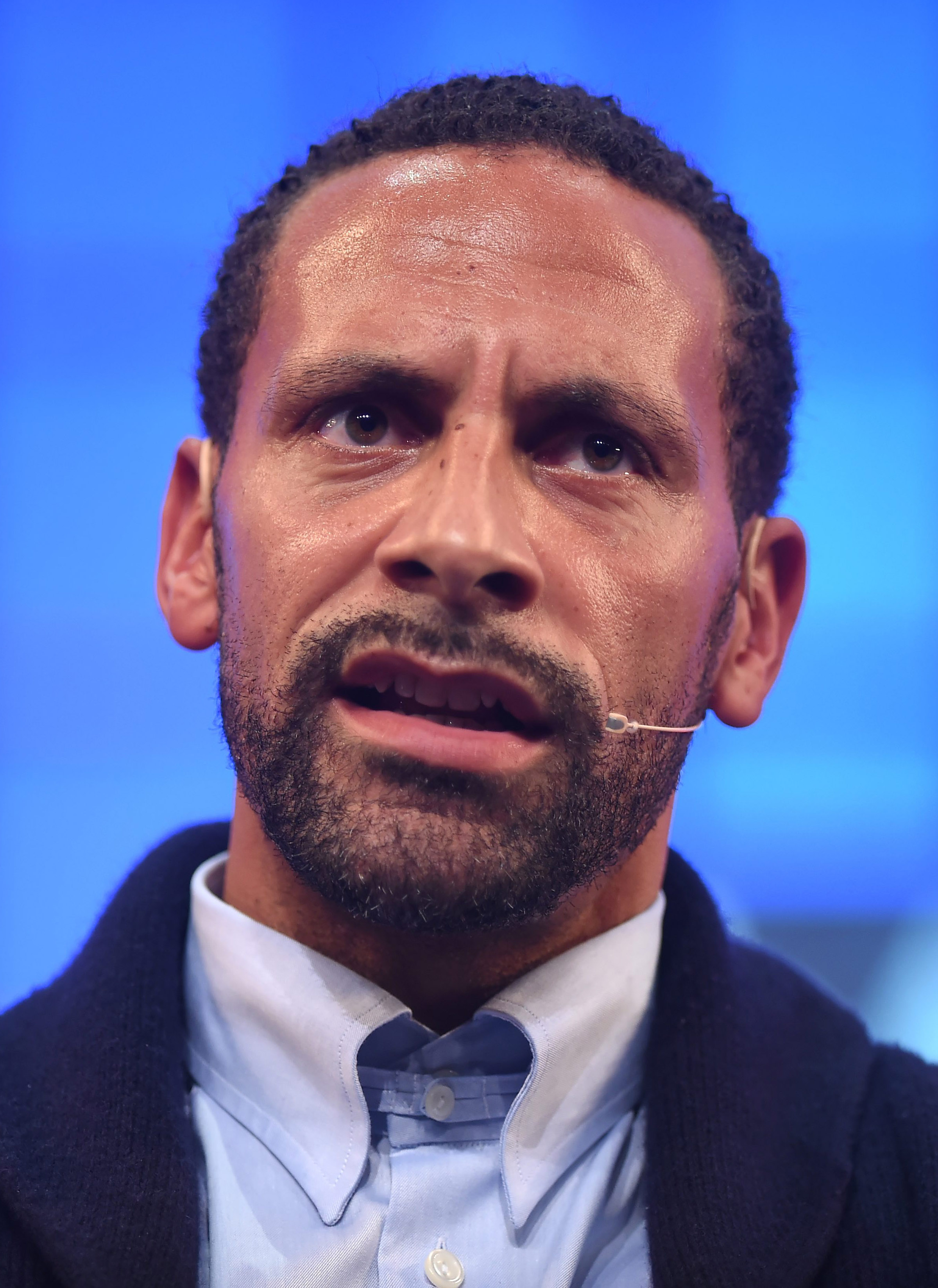
- Ferdinand in 2015

Personal information
- Full name: Rio Gavin Ferdinand
- Date of birth: 7 November 1978 (age 48)
- Place of birth: Camberwell, London, England
- Height: 6 ft 2 in (1.89 m)
- Position: Centre-back

Youth career
- 1992–1995: West Ham United

Senior career*
Years	Team	Apps	(Gls)
1995–2000	West Ham United	127	(2)
1996–1997	→ AFC Bournemouth (loan)	10	(0)
2000–2002	Leeds United	54	(2)
2002–2014	Manchester United	312	(7)
2014–2015	Queens Park Rangers	11	(0)
Total		514	(11)

International career
1996–1997	England U18	7	(0)
1997–2000	England U21	5	(0)
1997–2011	England	81	(3)
- * Club domestic league appearances and goals

Rio Gavin Ferdinand (born 7 November 1978) is an English former professional footballer who played as a centre-back, and was a television pundit for TNT Sports, for ten years. He played 81 times for the England national team between 1997 and 2011, and was a member of three FIFA World Cup squads. He is one of the most decorated English footballers of all time, regarded by many as one of England's greatest ever defenders.

Ferdinand began his football career playing for various youth teams, finally settling at West Ham United where he progressed through the youth ranks and made his professional Premier League debut in 1996. He became a fan favourite, winning the Hammer of the Year award the following season. He earned his first senior international cap in a match against Cameroon in 1997, setting a record as the youngest defender to play for England at the time. His achievements and footballing potential attracted Leeds United and he transferred to the club for a British record fee of £18 million. He spent two seasons at the club, becoming the club captain in 2001, before he joined Manchester United in July 2002 for around £30 million, breaking the British transfer fee record once more.

At Manchester United, he won the Premier League, his first major club honour, in a successful first season at the club. In September 2003, he missed a drugs test and was banned from football for eight months from January until September 2004, causing him to miss half a Premier League season, Manchester United's FA Cup triumph, and the Euro 2004 international competition. Upon his return, he established himself in the Manchester United first team and received plaudits for his performances, featuring in the PFA Team of the Year four times in five years. More club success followed with another Premier League win in the 2006–07 season and a Premier League and UEFA Champions League double the following year. His career at United, in which he won six Premier League titles and 14 trophies, ended when his contract expired in 2014, and he subsequently joined Queens Park Rangers where he played for just one season before being released from the club as a result of their relegation from the Premier League. He announced his retirement from professional football on 30 May 2015.

In September 2017, Ferdinand announced his intention to become a professional boxer, partly to help him cope with the death of his wife. His brother, Anton, also a centre-back, played for clubs including West Ham and Sunderland. Former England international striker Les Ferdinand and former Dagenham & Redbridge midfielder Kane Ferdinand are his cousins.

== Early life ==
=== Formative years and education ===
Rio Gavin Ferdinand was born on 7 November 1978 at King's College Hospital in Camberwell and grew up in Peckham. He is the son of an Irish mother, Janice Lavender, and an Afro-Saint Lucian father, Julian Ferdinand.

Ferdinand grew up in Peckham in a large family, his mother was one of six children and his father arrived in Britain with ten other family members. Both parents worked to support the family, his mother as a child carer and his father as a tailor. His parents never married and they separated when he was 14 years old. His father remained close, moving to a nearby estate, and took the kids to football training and to local parks. Ferdinand attended Camelot Primary School. At school, he focused on maths and revelled in the opportunity to perform before an audience during a school production of Bugsy Malone.

"I always as a kid wanted to do something different, I'd get bored very easily – even playing football or hanging around with my mates. So travelling away from home, meeting new people. ... I enjoyed it."

He chose to attend Blackheath Bluecoat School to make new friends and settled in well, feeling his confidence growing. His second year was marred by the death of a fellow pupil, Stephen Lawrence, and the event demonstrated the ever-present threat of violence. Ferdinand enjoyed physical expression, taking part in not just football and gymnastics classes but drama, theatre and ballet too. He was an able child: he represented Southwark in gymnastics at the London Youth Games, by age 10 he had been invited to train at the Queens Park Rangers academy, and at age 11 he won a scholarship to attend the Central School of Ballet in London. Ferdinand attended the ballet classes, travelling to the city centre four days a week for four years.

=== Youth-team career ===
Ferdinand's superior footballing abilities were evident even as a child: when he was 11 years old a youth coach, David Goodwin, remarked "I'm going to call you Pelé, son, I like the way you play." Ferdinand was regularly playing in youth teams and at Eltham Town he played as an attacking midfielder but team scouts saw the young player had the physical potential to be a centre-back instead. Teams vied for the young footballer's services and during his youth he trained with Charlton Athletic, Chelsea, Millwall and Queens Park Rangers. Ferdinand was ever curious of different places and even travelled north to Middlesbrough's training ground, spending a good part of his school holidays in a bedsit just to be there.

London team West Ham United was to be his footballing home, however, and he joined their youth system in 1992. He signed his first Youth Training Scheme contract in January 1994 and played alongside players such as Frank Lampard at the academy. Success pending at club level, international football also began for Ferdinand; at 16 he joined the England youth-team squad to compete in their age group's UEFA European Championship, gaining his first experience of international competition.

== Club career ==
=== West Ham United ===
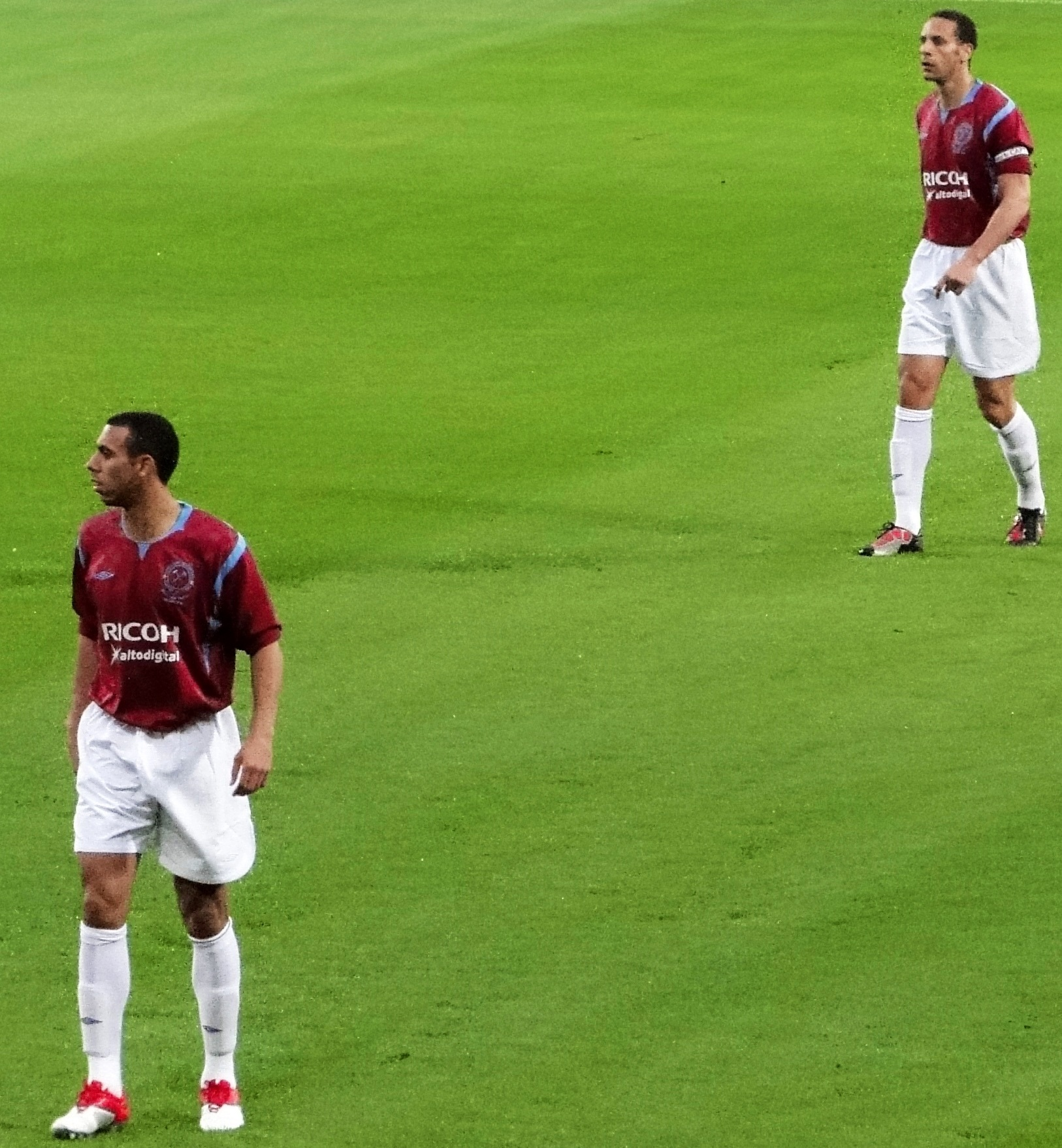
Rio and Anton Ferdinand playing in Tony Carr's testimonial match in 2010.

Originally scouted by Frank Lampard, Ferdinand progressed through the youth-team ranks, earning a professional contract and a place in the first-team squad in the process. On 5 May 1996, he made his senior team debut, as he came on as a substitute for Tony Cottee in the Hammers' last game of the season, a 1–1 home draw against Sheffield Wednesday. On 1 February 1997, Ferdinand scored his first goal for West Ham, in his sixth appearance for the club, scoring in a 2–1 loss against Blackburn Rovers. In doing so, Ferndinand became the youngest player, aged 18 and 86 days, to score for West Ham in the Premier League. During the summer of 1997, Manchester United made enquires about Ferdinand before they turned to Henning Berg after West Ham rejected any sale.

During the 1997–98 season, Ferdinand won the Hammer of the Year award at the young age of 19.

==== AFC Bournemouth (loan) ====
In November 1996, Ferdinand joined AFC Bournemouth on loan. He made his debut on 9 November in a 1–1 away draw against Blackpool. He played 10 games for Bournemouth before returning to West Ham in January 1997.

=== Leeds United ===
Ferdinand joined Premier League club Leeds United in November 2000 for £18 million, then a British transfer record as well as becoming the world's most expensive defender. Despite an uncomfortable start to his career at Elland Road, beginning with a 3–1 defeat at Leicester City on his debut, Ferdinand settled well and became an integral part of the Leeds team that reached the semi-final stage of the UEFA Champions League, scoring with a header in the quarter-final against Spain's Deportivo La Coruña. Other highlights during his spell in Yorkshire included goals against Liverpool at Anfield and a scoring return to Upton Park.

The following season, in August 2001, he became the club captain after replacing Lucas Radebe and turned in an impressive second campaign, despite Leeds' failure to break into the top three and secure qualification for the competition they had figured in so prominently during the previous season. During the 2002 FIFA World Cup, rumours began circulating that the club were in dire financial trouble and that new manager Terry Venables would be forced to part with his star defender for a substantial amount of cash. Later that summer after Ferdinand's impressive World Cup for England, Leeds accepted a bid of £29.3 million with possible performance related add-ons up to £33.3 million due to their perilous financial position. Years later, Rio admitted he sat in the office of Leeds chairman Peter Ridsdale for almost six hours to force the transfer through.

=== Manchester United ===
==== 2002–2007 ====
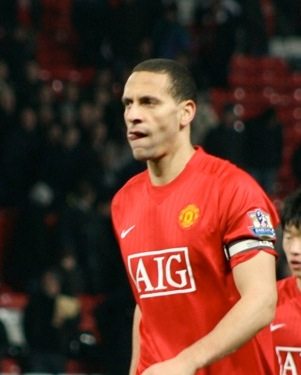
Ferdinand for Manchester United in 2008

On 22 July 2002, Ferdinand joined fellow Premier League side Manchester United on a five-year deal to become the most expensive British footballer in history at the time and the world's most expensive defender for a second time, a title he had lost in 2001 to Lilian Thuram. Ferdinand went on to win the Premier League title with Manchester United in his first season at the club. He collected a winner's medal in the 2006 League Cup, with runners-up medals in the 2003 League Cup and the 2005 FA Cup.

In September 2003, he failed to attend a drug test scheduled to take place at United's Carrington training ground. Ferdinand had left after training to go shopping, only to remember and attempt to return, only to be told it was too late. He later undertook the test and passed, and also later offered to have a hair follicle test, but the FA turned down the offer. The Football Association (FA) Disciplinary Committee, chaired by Barry Bright, imposed an eight-month ban from January 2004 at club and international level and a £50,000 fine, meaning he would miss the rest of the season and some of the next along with all of Euro 2004. United appealed against the verdict and sought to draw parallels to the case of Manchester City player Christian Negouai, who was fined £2,000 for missing a test. In the end, the original verdict was upheld. In September, it was announced that he would make his return against Liverpool; Alex Ferguson praised his "assuredness and composure" as United won the match 2–1.

In a fixture against Charlton Athletic in May 2005, United supporters booed Ferdinand amidst his refusal to sign a new contract. Ferdinand still hadn't signed a new contract in July and faced pressure from Ferguson to sign it, taking away his position as vice-captain. Ferdinand was booed during several pre-season friendlies in July and August, before finally signing a new four-year contract. Ferdinand later reflected on the saga, saying how he used it as motivation to change the views of United's supporters from negative to positive.

On 14 December, in a game against Wigan Athletic, Ferdinand scored his first goal for United, en route to a 4–0 victory. He followed this later in the month with a powerfully headed goal against West Bromwich Albion. On 22 January 2006, Ferdinand scored a last minute winner against Liverpool at Old Trafford. In the corresponding fixture in the following season on 22 October, Ferdinand scored again in a 2–0 victory.

Following impressive and consistent performances in the league, Rio Ferdinand was named in the 2006–07 PFA Premiership Team of the Season, alongside seven of his Manchester United teammates.

==== 2007–2014 ====
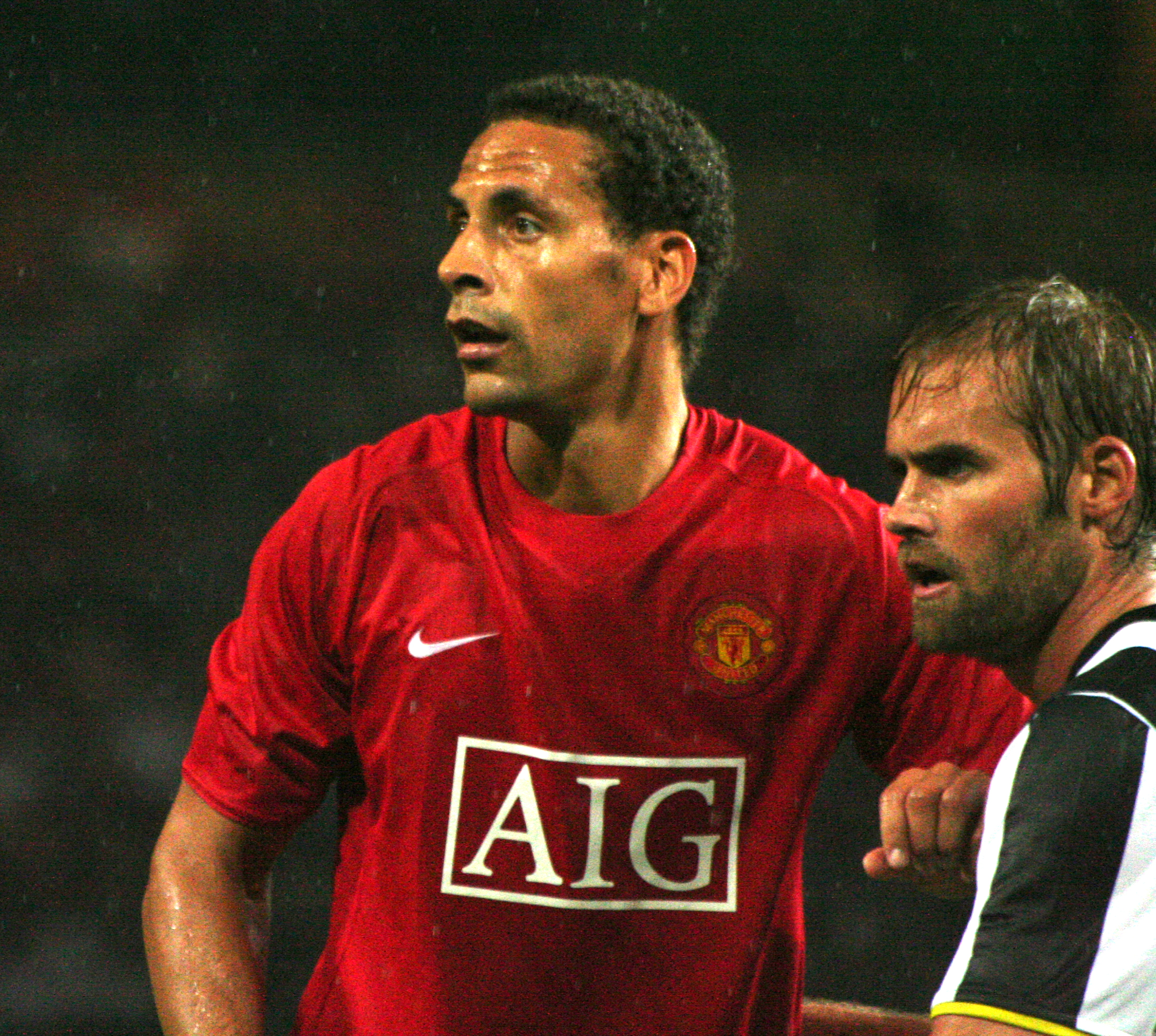
Ferdinand with Olof Mellberg in a match against Juventus in 2008

Ferdinand started the 2007–08 season well, he was part of a United defence that managed to keep six clean sheets in a row in the Premier League, before conceding an early goal to Aston Villa at Villa Park on 20 October 2007. It was also during this game where Ferdinand scored his first goal of the season, which was United's third goal of that game, with a left foot strike which took a very strong deflection off one of Villa's defenders. Just three days later, Ferdinand scored his first European goal for United by opening the scoring against Dynamo Kyiv, with a superb header. United dominated the game and won 4–2.

On 12 January 2008, Ferdinand bagged a rare Premier League goal in a 6–0 hammering of Newcastle United at Old Trafford. In their FA Cup quarter-final match against Portsmouth on 8 March 2008 when Manchester United dominated, Ferdinand made a rare appearance as a goalkeeper, after Edwin van der Sar left the pitch with a groin injury and the replacement keeper, Tomasz Kuszczak, was sent off after conceding a penalty. Despite diving the right way, he was unable to save Sulley Muntari's spot kick, and Manchester United were eliminated from the FA Cup. On 6 April 2008, against Middlesbrough, Ferdinand limped out of the match due to a foot injury. He was rated doubtful whether he would face A.S. Roma in the UEFA Champions League quarter-final second leg on 9 April 2008. He would play the full 90 minutes, though he received three stitches at half-time.

After United's 2–1 loss to Chelsea in the Premier League in April 2008, Ferdinand swore at Chelsea stewards and tried to kick a wall in the tunnel, but instead kicked a female steward, Tracy Wray. Ferdinand claimed to have merely brushed her with his foot. He said he had apologised and sent the steward some flowers. However, Wray showed the bruise on her leg to the media, and her husband claimed that Ferdinand had not apologised or sent flowers.

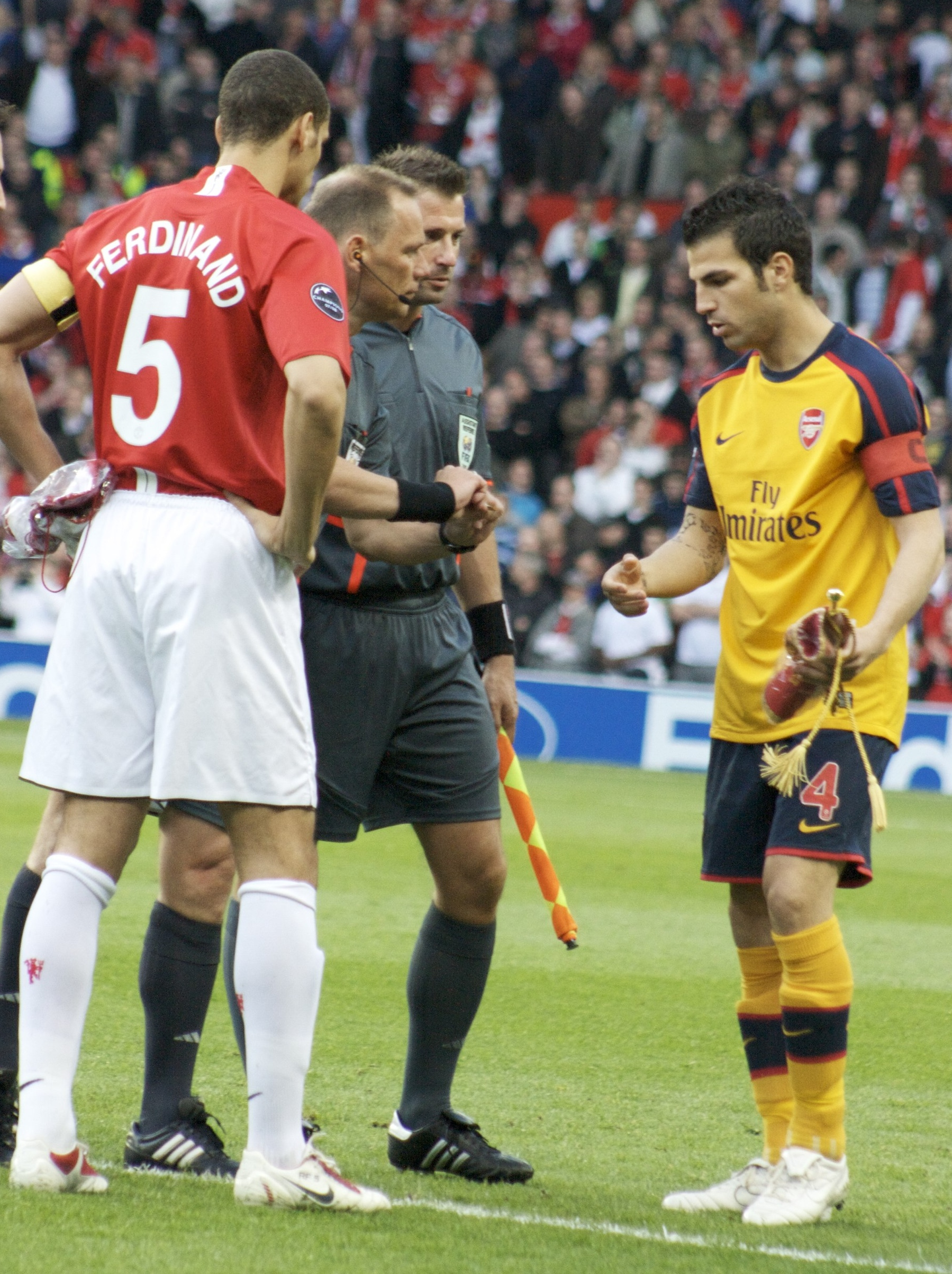
Ferdinand as captain during the 2008–09 Champions League semi-final.

It was announced on 18 April 2008 that, along with Michael Carrick and Wes Brown, Ferdinand had agreed to sign a new five-year contract, worth around £130,000 a week, that would keep him with United until 2013. On 21 May 2008, Ferdinand captained Manchester United to a Champions League Final victory versus Chelsea. He accepted the trophy together with Ryan Giggs, as Giggs was the on field captain for most of the matches during that season during Gary Neville's absence due to injury.

In an interview with BBC Radio 5 Live he criticised FIFA's approach to tackling racism in football, stating that not enough was being done to punish those guilty of homophobic or racist abuse at matches. Regarding taunts aimed at Emile Heskey in England's 4–1 victory against Croatia in Zagreb, Ferdinand remarked:

"Croatia were fined a few thousand quid. What's that going to do? That is not going to stop people shouting racist or homophobic abuse...If things like this keep happening you have to take points off them. Then the punters will realise the team is going to be punished."

Ferdinand had an injury plagued 2009–10 season, a number of back and knee injuries kept him on the sidelines for months. He returned to action on 28 January 2010, but was banned for four games after being found guilty of violent conduct for elbowing Hull City's Craig Fagan.

Due to a knee injury he suffered in the summer of 2010, which ruled him out of the World Cup for England, he missed all of pre-season, the Community Shield and the first four games of the 2010–11 Premier League season. He returned to first-team football in the opening game of the Champions League group stage against Rangers on 14 September. He captained the side and played the full 90 minutes in a goalless draw. He started the season opening game in August 2011, the 2011 FA Community Shield, where United found themselves 2–0 down at half time to city rivals Manchester City. Ferdinand was taken off after 45 minutes along with defensive partner Nemanja Vidić and replaced by Jonny Evans and Phil Jones respectively. United went on to win the game 3–2 and Ferdinand claimed his fourth Community Shield medal of his career. Ferdinand started in the opening Premier League match of the season at West Bromwich Albion, a game United won 2–1, but he went off with a hamstring injury after 75 minutes. After the match, Alex Ferguson confirmed that Ferdinand would be out for six weeks. Ferdinand however recovered much quicker than initially diagnosed and returned to take a place on the bench two weeks later at Old Trafford in United's 8–2 demolition of Arsenal, although he did not play a part in the game. Ferdinand made his return to competitive action in a 1–1 draw against Stoke City at the Britannia Stadium.

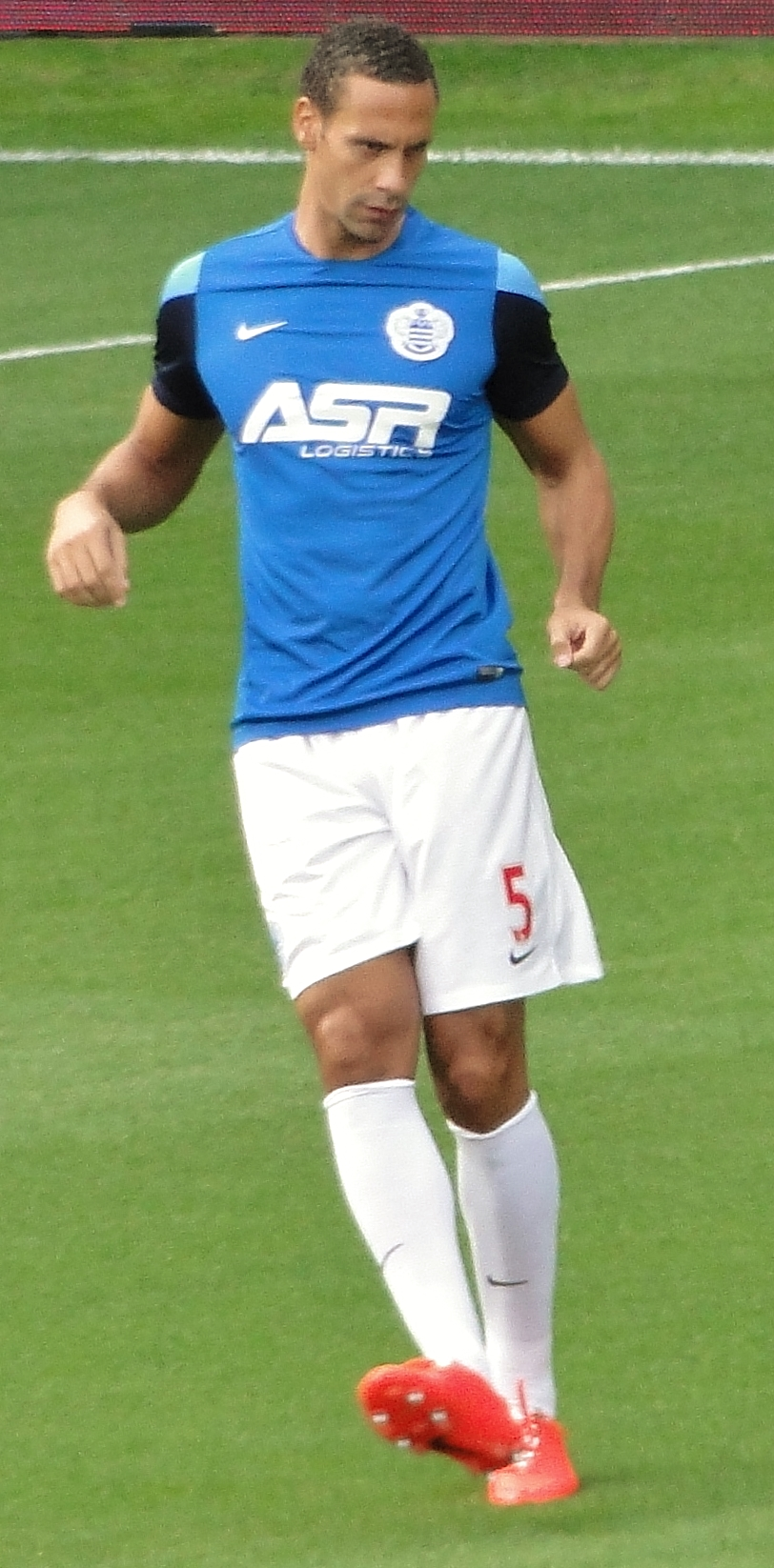
Ferdinand with Queens Park Rangers, October 2014

On 9 December 2012, Ferdinand was struck and injured by a coin thrown from the home crowd during United's 3–2 derby victory away from home against Manchester City.

On 5 March 2013, Ferdinand, unhappy with the referee Cüneyt Çakır's decision to send off Nani during a 2–1 Champions League defeat to Real Madrid at Old Trafford, clapped sarcastically in the referee's face after the game. He escaped any punishment from UEFA for the incident.

On 12 May 2013, Ferdinand scored the winner and final goal of the Alex Ferguson era at Old Trafford in a 2–1 victory over Swansea City. After a corner was missed by everyone, the ball found its way to Ferdinand at the back post and he hit it on the volley to seal the win. On 23 May 2013, it was announced that Ferdinand had secured a new one-year contract that would see him stay with the club until the end of the 2013–14 season. He was not offered an extension when that contract expired, and agreed to leave Manchester United on 12 May 2014. In a letter on his official website, he said "I am feeling fit and healthy, ready for a new challenge and looking forward to whatever the future holds for me."

=== Queens Park Rangers ===
On 17 July 2014, Ferdinand signed for newly promoted Premier League club Queens Park Rangers on a one-year contract. He returned to Old Trafford for the first time since leaving Manchester United on 14 September 2014 to face his former club in the Premier League in which his side was beaten 4–0.

In October 2014, Ferdinand confirmed in an interview on The Jonathan Ross Show that he would retire at the end of the season, saying "I'm not fearful of retirement, I'm looking forward to it, I can see some good stuff hopefully happening ahead". In May 2015, following their relegation, Queens Park Rangers announced the release of Ferdinand in the summer. He made only 12 appearances for QPR in his only season with the club.

On 30 May 2015, Ferdinand announced his retirement from professional football, three days after his departure from QPR.

== International career ==
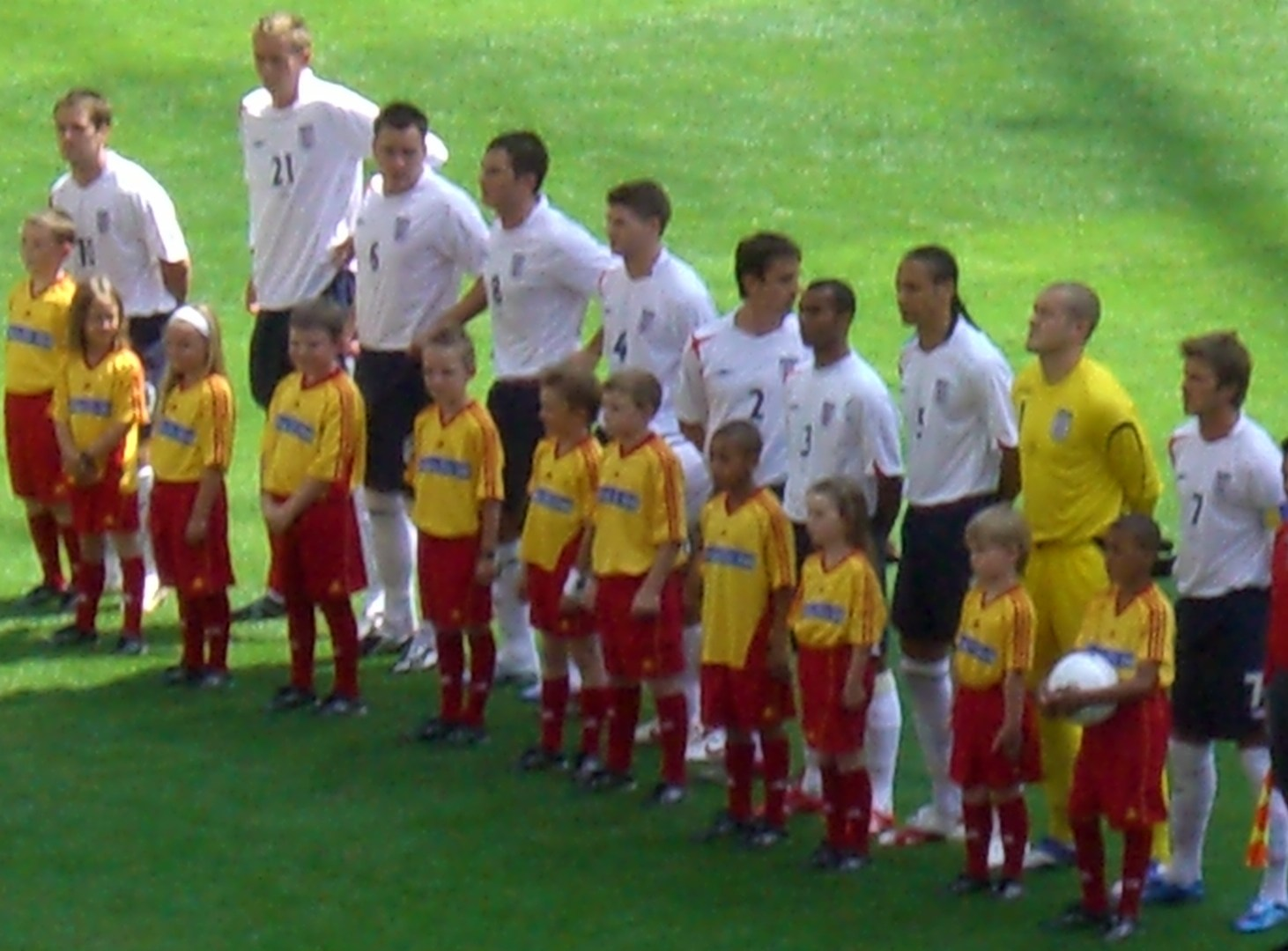
Ferdinand (wearing No.5) lining up for England against Paraguay at the 2006 FIFA World Cup.

Ferdinand was capped 81 times for England, making him England's second most capped black player behind Ashley Cole with 107. Although Ferdinand was named in four consecutive England World Cup squads (albeit without playing in 1998 and missing 2010 through injury), he never went to a European Championship due to a ban for missing a drugs test and due to England's failure to qualify for UEFA Euro 2008.

Ferdinand scored three goals for England, the first in the 2002 World Cup second round match against Denmark (although some sources credit this goal as a Thomas Sørensen own goal). The second was a near-post strike that beat the Russian goalkeeper Vyacheslav Malafeev in England's Euro 2008 qualifier against Russia on 12 September 2007 at Wembley Stadium. The third on 11 October 2008 in a 2010 FIFA World Cup qualifying match at home to Kazakhstan. England won 5–1.

At the age of 19 years and 8 days, Ferdinand earned his first full England cap as a substitute in a friendly against Cameroon on 15 November 1997, making him the youngest defender to play for England at the time (a record broken in 2006 by Micah Richards). Ferdinand would have made an even earlier debut in September had he not been charged with drink-driving in the build-up to England's 1998 World Cup qualifier against Moldova. Ferdinand was named in the squad for this game and was a likely starter; however, the public mourning for Diana, Princess of Wales – whose chauffeur had been suspected of drink-driving – left Glenn Hoddle with little choice but to drop the teenager from the squad. After an impressive 1997–98 season he was selected for the 1998 FIFA World Cup squad as a back-up defender. However, he was not selected in Kevin Keegan's 22-man squad for UEFA Euro 2000.

After his £18 million move to Leeds United, Ferdinand was named in the starting line-up by caretaker manager Peter Taylor in a friendly match against Italy and quickly established himself as a first-choice player under Sven-Göran Eriksson. He was selected as one of England's two first-choice centre-backs at the 2002 and 2006 FIFA World Cups, wearing the number 5 shirt.

John Terry (with whom Ferdinand would later partner in central defence) replaced Ferdinand in the England side throughout his eight-month ban until his return on 9 October 2004 in their World Cup qualifier against Wales. Ferdinand played ten World Cup finals matches for England, recording clean sheets against Argentina, Nigeria and Denmark in 2002, and Paraguay, Trinidad & Tobago, Ecuador and Portugal in 2006.

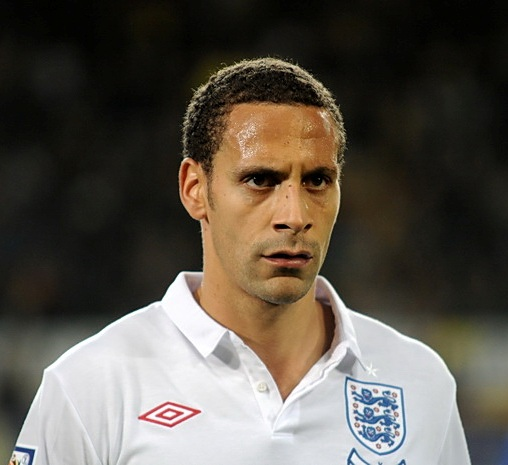
Ferdinand on international duty, 2009

On 25 March 2008, it was announced that Ferdinand would wear the captain's armband for Fabio Capello's second game in charge of the national team, ahead of John Terry, Steven Gerrard or David Beckham, who some believed would be named captain to mark his 100th cap for his country. An FA statement suggested that the decision to name Ferdinand as captain was part of Capello's plans of rotating the captaincy before naming an official captain for September's World Cup qualifiers. On 19 August, however, Ferdinand lost out to Terry in retaining the captain's armband but was named vice-captain by Fabio Capello.

A mistake in the match between England and Ukraine in Dnipropetrovsk on 10 October 2009, which led to the sending off of Robert Green, caused some to question his inclusion in the squad. A lack of match practice for his club and a series of errors such as he suffered in his early days as a footballer led to criticism of his inclusion from several corners.

On 5 February 2010, Ferdinand replaced John Terry as captain of England.

Although back and groin injury problems forced him to miss much of the 2009–10 domestic season, Ferdinand was selected to captain England at the 2010 World Cup. However, he suffered a knee ligament injury during the team's first training session in South Africa on 4 June and was subsequently ruled out of the tournament. On 19 March 2011, ahead of England's Euro 2012 qualifier against Wales, Capello announced that John Terry was to be re-instated as permanent England captain and that Ferdinand would return to his role of vice-captain.

Ferdinand was left out of Roy Hodgson's squad for Euro 2012, leading to strong speculation this was to avoid potential conflict with John Terry, who was included in the squad, due to Terry's upcoming trial for racially abusing Ferdinand's brother Anton. Further controversy arose after Gary Cahill was ruled out of the tournament, with 22-year-old Martin Kelly with only two minutes of international football being called up as a replacement instead of Ferdinand. This led to Ferdinand's representative Jamie Moralee accusing Hodgson of showing a "lack of respect".

On 3 October 2012, the Daily Mirror reported that Roy Hodgson had revealed to fellow passengers on the London Underground that Ferdinand would no longer be considered for England duty, despite the retirement of John Terry. Hodgson later apologised for these comments and denied that he was ruling Ferdinand out of playing for England again.

On 14 March 2013, Ferdinand was recalled to the England squad for the first time under Hodgson for England's 2014 World Cup qualifiers against San Marino and Montenegro, though subsequently Ferdinand pulled out of the squad on 18 March due to 'fitness concerns'. Ferdinand said he was "gutted" at having to withdraw but said it was the "right decision". However, Roy Hodgson assured Ferdinand he still had an international future despite the withdrawal.

In May 2013, Ferdinand announced his retirement from international football, saying that "it's the right time to make room for young players and focus on the club career".

== Style of play ==
Ferdinand was considered an atypical defensive product of English football due to his more elegant, graceful, and "continental" rather than physical style of defensive play; in particular, he was singled out for his unique technical ability, skill, balance, and confidence on the ball, despite his height, as well as his composure in possession, distribution with either foot, and his ability to carry the ball forward or play it out from the back on the ground. As such, due to his mobility and ball–playing ability, he was often paired with a more physical centre-back throughout his career, such as Nemanja Vidić with Manchester United, or John Terry with England. Although he often played in a central defensive pairing in a back–four throughout his career, he was also capable of playing in the centre of a three–man back–line, in which he essentially functioned as a sweeper, courtesy of his technique and passing. Due to his ball skills, he occasionally drew criticism from pundits and his managers in his youth for taking unnecessary risks in possession, and committing mistakes, although he improved upon this aspect of the game as he matured with age and experience.

A world-class defender, who was considered to be one of the best stoppers in the world at his peak, Ferdinand is regarded as one of the best defenders of his generation, and as one of England's, Manchester United's, and the Premier League's best ever centre-backs. In his prime, he was also praised for his pace, work-rate, and tackling, in addition to his positioning, consistency, intelligence, and ability to read the game. He was also an athletic and physically strong defender, who was reliable in the air, although at times he was criticised in the media for his aerial game, as well as his ability to defend high balls and set pieces, in particular in his youth. In addition to his defensive skills, he also possessed significant leadership qualities. Despite his ability, however, his later career was marked by injuries, which led him to lose the exceptional pace which had characterised him in his early career, and which previously allowed him to compensate for the occasional lapses in concentration he experienced in his youth; as such, he occasionally struggled against faster opponents with his advancing age.

== Boxing career ==
In September 2017, Ferdinand announced that he was launching a career to become a professional boxer. His move into the ring was sponsored by betting company Betfair, who assisted him in attempting to qualify for his British Boxing Board of Control (BBBC) licence before he began training and competing. Ferdinand stated that "I'm doing this [boxing] because it's a challenge, I've won titles and now I'm aiming for a belt." It was announced in May 2018 that Ferdinand had been refused a professional boxing licence by the British Boxing Board of Control. BBBofC general secretary Robert Smith told BBC Sport: "There are a lot of things we take into consideration. He never had a competitive fight and although he has been in the gym, there is a difference between being in the gym and boxing. We do not deem it beneficial for him to have a licence." Following the rejection, Ferdinand announced that he was "hanging-up his gloves".

== FA commission ==
On 20 October 2013, Ferdinand and Roy Hodgson were appointed to the Football Association's commission to improve the state of the national game.

== Personal life ==
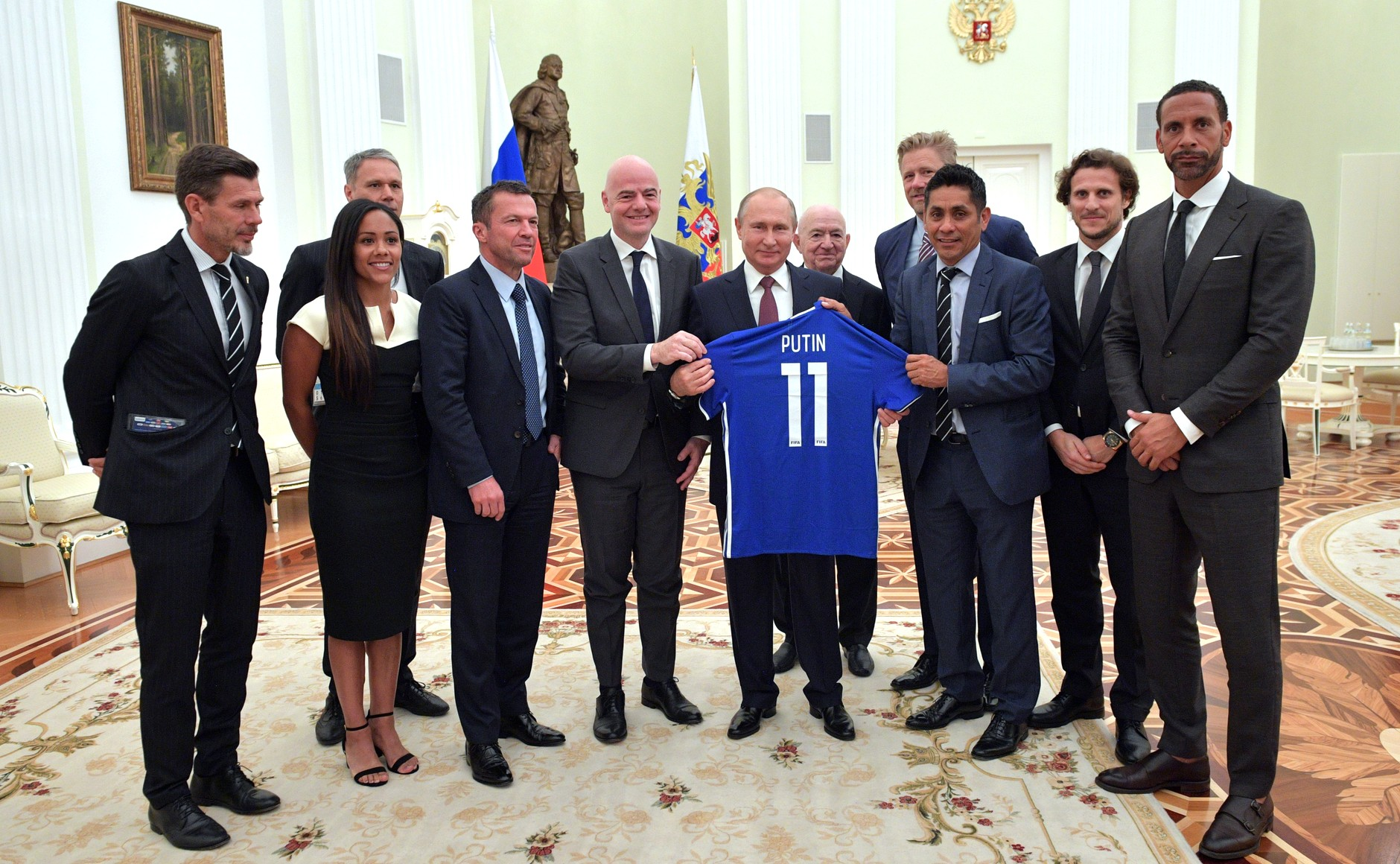
Ferdinand (far right) with Russian President Vladimir Putin (centre) at the 2018 FIFA World Cup in Russia

Ferdinand grew up in the Friary council estate, Peckham. He has several brothers and sisters: one brother and three sisters on his father's side and a brother and sister from his mother's remarriage. His brother, Anton Ferdinand, also played as a defender, while his cousins are Les Ferdinand and Kane Ferdinand. Although he spent the majority of his career with Manchester United, he grew up supporting rivals Liverpool.

In 2006 in Manchester, Ferdinand's girlfriend Rebecca Ellison gave birth to their first son, Lorenz. The couple had two more children, a son Tate born in 2008 and a daughter, and both Lorenz and Tate now play professional football for Brighton & Hove Albion U21s.

In 2010, Ferdinand unsuccessfully sued the Sunday Mirror to prevent the publication of a story about an alleged affair with Carly Storey. During the case, it was alleged that then-England captain Ferdinand had affairs with ten different women.

Ellison and Ferdinand married in 2009. Ellison died of breast cancer on 2 May 2015, aged 34. Ferdinand's memoir of his wife's illness and subsequent bereavement, Thinking Out Loud, was co-written with Decca Aitkenhead, and published in October 2017.

On 27 September 2019, Ferdinand married for the second time, to Kate Wright. The ceremony was attended by his children, along with the couple's other close family members. In June 2020, Ferdinand and Wright announced that they were expecting their first child together. The child, a boy, was born on 18 December 2020, and a daughter was born two years later. In 2025, Ferdinand and his family relocated to Dubai, citing better educational standards for his children and the quality of UAE lifestyle.

Ferdinand set up the Live the Dream Foundation charity in December 2009 to provide education and employment opportunities for children.

=== Politics ===
Although Ferdinand has never voted before in a general election, he backed a Remain vote in the 2016 United Kingdom European Union membership referendum.

=== Controversies ===
In 2000, Ferdinand briefly appeared in a sexually explicit video filmed at the Ayia Napa resort in Cyprus along with fellow English footballers Kieron Dyer and Frank Lampard. Channel 4 aired a brief clip as part of their 2004 documentary Sex, Footballers and Videotape, claiming it was used to "remind the viewer that this is based on real life".

In 2002, during the rape trial of their acquaintance Martin King, Ferdinand and former Leeds colleague Michael Duberry denied allegations that Duberry had molested the woman and Ferdinand had threatened her in the Leeds nightclub Hi-Fi on the night of 22 January, as well as further allegations of scuffling and drunkenness. Both men were interviewed by the police but the Crown Prosecution Service announced in April 2003 that they would not face charges. King was found guilty of indecent assault and attempted rape.

During a radio interview on The Chris Moyles Show in October 2006, Ferdinand attracted two listener complaints and criticism from gay rights campaigner Peter Tatchell when he called Moyles a faggot, followed by "I'm sorry, I'm sorry, I'm sorry. I'm not homophobic", after Moyles had jokingly suggested he was homosexual. BBC Radio 1 later dismissed the exchange as banter, while Tatchell said "since [he] very promptly apologised, I am happy to accept his regret and leave it at that".

In the wake of a court case involving John Terry and Rio's brother Anton, in which Terry was found not guilty of racial abuse, Rio Ferdinand sparked media controversy by expressing amusement at the comments of a Twitter user who referred to Ashley Cole, who had testified in Terry's favour, as a "choc ice", a slang term which is commonly understood to mean "black on the outside, white on the inside". Ferdinand deleted the tweet shortly afterwards and denied choc ice is a racist term, adding, "And if I want to laugh at something someone tweets....I will! Hahahahaha! Now stop getting ya knickers in a twist!" Cole's lawyers released a statement in response, stating that he would not be taking the matter further. Ferdinand's words were condemned as "insensitive and untimely" by Professional Footballers' Association (PFA) chief Clarke Carlisle. In August 2012, Ferdinand was fined £45,000 for his Twitter remarks after an Independent Regulatory Commission found him guilty of bringing the game into disrepute with an "improper" comment which included "a reference to ethnic origin, colour or race."

In October 2014, Ferdinand was again charged by the FA for using offensive language on Twitter, after referring to the mother of a critic as a "sket", a Jamaican slang word for a promiscuous female. Ferdinand was fined £25,000 for the offence and banned from playing for three games. The FA considered Ferdinand's position as a "role model" to be an aggravating factor for the penalty, in addition to it being his second Twitter offence within three years and no admission of wrongdoing.

In March 2015, it was announced that Ferdinand would be the new face of online casino Casino Floor. The announcement provoked strong criticism on Twitter from a number of Ferdinand's followers, who suggested it was inappropriate that a role model for young people should endorse gambling, particularly given the well documented struggles of many of his peers with problem gambling.

=== Driving bans ===
In September 1997, Ferdinand was convicted of drink-driving and given a one-year driving ban. He had been breathalysed after driving on the morning after a night out, and was found to be one point over the limit. As a result, England manager Glenn Hoddle dropped Ferdinand from the squad to face Moldova in a World Cup qualification match on 10 September, meaning Ferdinand lost out on the chance, at 18 years and 10 months of age, of becoming the youngest England international since Duncan Edwards.

In March 2003, Ferdinand was given another six-month ban from driving, and fined £2,500 and six penalty points for driving at an average of 92 mph (148 km/h) along the M1. In May 2005, he was criticised by a magistrate as he received his fourth ban from driving and a fine of £1,500, after being caught by traffic police "travelling at an average of 105.9 mph (170.4 km/h) over a distance of nearly two miles" on the M6 motorway. Upon setting the penalty, the magistrate said Ferdinand "should be a positive role model for young people in society and this does not give out the right message". It followed two previous bans for speeding, in 2002 and 2003.

In August 2020, Ferdinand was banned from driving for six months after he admitted speeding on the A27 at Hangleton in Hove. Ferdinand was reported to have driven at 85 mph. He was ordered to pay a total of £822 in fines and costs.

=== Order of the British Empire ===
He was appointed Officer of the Order of the British Empire (OBE) in the 2022 Birthday Honours for services to association football and charity, having set up the Rio Ferdinand Foundation in 2022, a charity which works with young people and aids community development.

=== Racist abuse ===
In December 2023, a 33-year-old man from Staffordshire was sent to prison for six months, having been found guilty of racially abusing Ferdinand at Molineux in May 2021. Ferdinand was working there as a TV pundit for a match between Wolverhampton Wanderers and Manchester United.

== Television, punditry, film and music ==
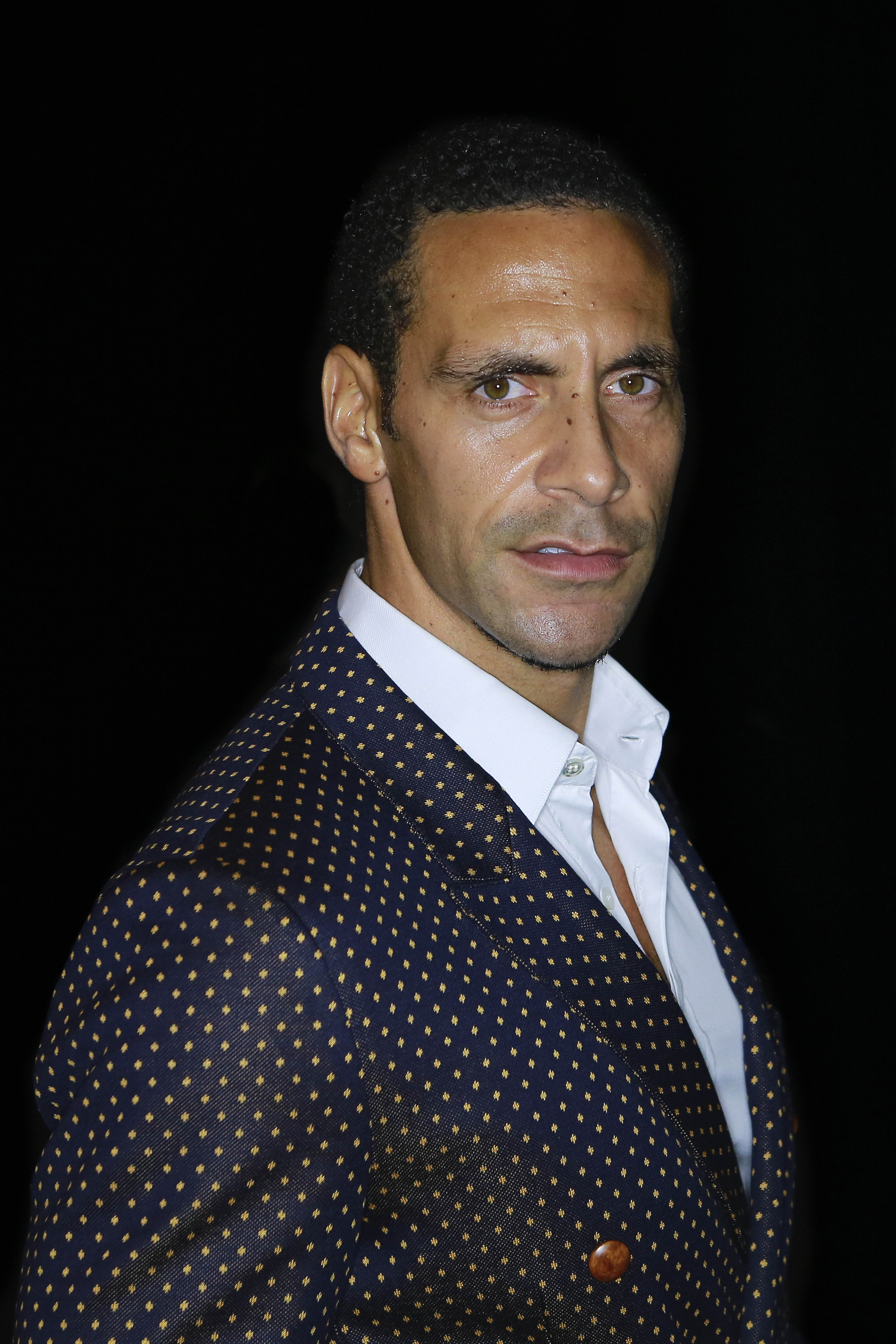
Ferdinand in 2015

The Duran Duran song "Rio" has been used in football chants both for and against Ferdinand; in 2002, fan Simon Le Bon (Duran Duran's lead singer) promised to re-record one of the football chants if the England team (featuring Ferdinand) won their World Cup quarter-final against Brazil.

Ferdinand was sponsored by sportswear company Nike and appeared in Nike commercials. In a global Nike advertising campaign in the run-up to the 2002 World Cup in Korea and Japan, he starred in a "Secret Tournament" commercial (branded "Scorpion KO") directed by Terry Gilliam, appearing alongside football players such as Thierry Henry, Ronaldo, Francesco Totti, Ronaldinho, Luís Figo, Fabio Cannavaro, and Hidetoshi Nakata, with former player Eric Cantona the tournament "referee".

In 2005, Ferdinand, along with an old school friend, created the record label White Chalk Music. To date, there are two artists signed to the label: Melody Johnston and Nia Jai. The latter released an album on 6 October 2010, which features Ferdinand rapping.

In June 2006, ahead of the 2006 FIFA World Cup, Ferdinand presented the TV show Rio's World Cup Wind-Ups, in which he carried out a series of practical jokes on his England teammates. It was broadcast immediately after England's opening World Cup game against Paraguay.

He made his first foray into the world of cinema in late 2008, financing and becoming an executive producer of Alex de Rakoff's film Dead Man Running. The film features Danny Dyer and 50 Cent in a gangster-themed plot. Ferdinand will share production credits with England teammate Ashley Cole.

In 2008, Ferdinand filmed a documentary about Peckham, aiming to persuade youngsters away from a life of crime.

On 16 January 2009, it was announced that he would be working with publishing company Made Up Media to launch a digital magazine. In conjunction with this, Ferdinand was guest editor of the February edition of the Observer Sport Monthly, providing interviews with people ranging from Gordon Brown to Usain Bolt. The magazine, called #5 Magazine, had its first issue published in April of that year.

In 2015, he joined BT Sport (now TNT Sports) as a pundit for their coverage of the Premier League, FA Cup, UEFA Champions League and UEFA Europa League.

In March 2017, Ferdinand discussed strategies for coping with bereavement in the BBC One documentary Rio Ferdinand: Being Mum and Dad. The programme won the Robert Flaherty Award for Single Documentary at the 2018 BAFTA Awards.

Released in November 2022, Ferdinand was the focus of a three-part docuseries entitled Rio Ferdinand's Tipping Point which explored race, sexuality, and mental health in football communities.

Ferdinand also participated in the 2026 FIFA World Cup draw on 5 December 2025.

During the World Cup he co-hosted FIFA World Cup on FOX After Hours with James Corden, a daily comedic recap show with James Corden and Ian Karmel.

== Career statistics ==
=== Club ===
Appearances and goals by club, season and competition
Club	Season	League			FA Cup		League Cup		Europe		Other		Total	
Club	Season	Division	Apps	Goals	Apps	Goals	Apps	Goals	Apps	Goals	Apps	Goals	Apps	Goals
West Ham United	1995–96	Premier League	1	0	0	0	0	0	—		—		1	0
West Ham United	1996–97	Premier League	15	2	1	0	1	0	—		—		17	2
West Ham United	1997–98	Premier League	35	0	6	0	5	0	—		—		46	0
West Ham United	1998–99	Premier League	31	0	1	0	1	0	—		—		33	0
West Ham United	1999–2000	Premier League	33	0	1	0	4	0	3 (Note: Appearances in UEFA Cup)	0	6 (Note: Appearances in UEFA Intertoto Cup)	0	46	0
West Ham United	2000–01	Premier League	12	0	—		2	0	—		—		14	0
West Ham United	Total		127	2	9	0	13	0	3	0	6	0	158	2
AFC Bournemouth (loan)	1996–97	Second Division	10	0	—		—		—		1 (Note: Appearance in Football League Trophy)	0	11	0
Leeds United	2000–01	Premier League	23	2	2	0	—		7 (Note: Appearances in UEFA Champions League)	1	—		32	3
Leeds United	2001–02	Premier League	31	0	1	0	2	0	7	0	—		41	0
Leeds United	Total		54	2	3	0	2	0	14	1	0	0	73	3
Manchester United	2002–03	Premier League	28	0	3	0	4	0	11	0	—		46	0
Manchester United	2003–04	Premier League	20	0	0	0	0	0	6	0	1 (Note: Appearance in FA Community Shield)	0	27	0
Manchester United	2004–05	Premier League	31	0	5	0	1	0	5	0	0	0	42	0
Manchester United	2005–06	Premier League	37	3	2	0	5	0	8	0	—		52	3
Manchester United	2006–07	Premier League	33	1	7	0	0	0	9	0	—		49	1
Manchester United	2007–08	Premier League	35	2	4	0	0	0	11	1	1	0	51	3
Manchester United	2008–09	Premier League	24	0	3	0	1	0	11	0	4 (Note: One appearance in FA Community Shield, one in UEFA Super Cup, two in FIFA Club World Cup)	0	43	0
Manchester United	2009–10	Premier League	13	0	0	0	1	0	6	0	1	0	21	0
Manchester United	2010–11	Premier League	19	0	2	0	1	0	7	0	0	0	29	0
Manchester United	2011–12	Premier League	30	0	1	0	0	0	6 (Note: Four appearances in UEFA Champions League, two in UEFA Europa League)	0	1	0	38	0
Manchester United	2012–13	Premier League	28	1	2	0	0	0	4	0	—		34	1
Manchester United	2013–14	Premier League	14	0	1	0	1	0	7	0	0	0	23	0
Manchester United	Total		312	7	30	0	14	0	91	1	8	0	455	8
Queens Park Rangers	2014–15	Premier League	11	0	1	0	0	0	—		—		12	0
Career total			514	11	43	0	29	0	108	2	15	0	709	13

=== International ===
Appearances and goals by national team and year
National team	Year	Apps	Goals
England	1997	1	0
England	1998	4	0
England	1999	3	0
England	2000	2	0
England	2001	9	0
England	2002	9	1
England	2003	5	0
England	2004	3	0
England	2005	8	0
England	2006	12	0
England	2007	8	1
England	2008	8	1
England	2009	4	0
England	2010	4	0
England	2011	1	0
Total		81	3

Scores and results list England's goal tally first, score column indicates score after each Ferdinand goal.

List of international goals scored by Rio Ferdinand
No.	Date	Venue	Cap	Opponent	Score	Result	Competition
1	15 June 2002	Niigata Stadium, Niigata, Japan	26	Denmark	1–0	3–0	2002 FIFA World Cup
2	12 September 2007	Wembley Stadium, London, England	62	Russia	3–0	3–0	UEFA Euro 2008 qualification
3	11 October 2008	Wembley Stadium, London, England	71	Kazakhstan	1–0	5–1	2010 FIFA World Cup qualification

== Honours ==
West Ham United

- UEFA Intertoto Cup: 1999

Manchester United

- Premier League: 2002–03, 2006–07, 2007–08, 2008–09, 2010–11, 2012–13
- Football League Cup: 2005–06, 2008–09; runner-up: 2002–03
- FA Community Shield: 2003, 2007, 2008, 2011
- UEFA Champions League: 2007–08; runner-up: 2008–09, 2010–11
- FIFA Club World Cup: 2008
- FA Cup runner-up: 2004–05, 2006–07

Individual

- West Ham United Hammer of the Year: 1997–98
- PFA Premier League Team of the Year: 2001–02, 2004–05, 2006–07, 2007–08, 2008–09, 2012–13
- Premier League Player of the Month: October 2001
- ESM Team of the Year: 2007–08
- FIFPro World XI: 2007–08
- London Youth Games Hall of Fame: 2010 inductee
- Premier League 20 Seasons Awards (1992–93 to 2011–12)
  - Fantasy Teams of the 20 Seasons (Panel choice)
- English Football Hall of Fame: 2016 Inductee
- Premier League Hall of Fame: 2023

Orders and special awards

- BAFTA Award for Best Single Documentary: 2018
- Honorary degree of Doctor of Letters (D.Litt) from London South Bank University: 3 March 2022
- Officer of the Order of the British Empire in the Civil Division "For services to Association Football and to Charity" in the 2022 Queen's Birthday Honours List: 1 June 2022

== Bibliography ==
Title	Year published	Pages	Ref.
Rio: My Story	2007	470	
Rio: My Decade as a Red	2013	256	
#2Sides: My Autobiography	2014	271	
Thinking Out Loud: Love, Grief and Being Mum and Dad	2017	288	

== See also ==
- List of doping cases in sport
