= Rio's World Cup Wind-Ups =

- Starring: Rio Ferdinand
- Country of origin: United Kingdom
- No. of episodes: 1

Production
- Running time: 75 mins
- Production companies: ITV Granada; Next Generation TV & Film

Original release
- Network: ITV1
- Release: 1 July 2006

Rio's World Cup Wind-Ups was a short hidden camera practical joke show hosted by English footballer Rio Ferdinand which was filmed shortly before the 2006 FIFA World Cup. The show strongly resembled the American show Punk'd which is hosted and produced by Ashton Kutcher. Ferdinand chose certain English footballers to play a prank on. The pranks would usually end with the catchphrase — You got merked!.

== Footballers who were "Merked" ==
- Gary Neville: Neville comes for training (with Ryan Giggs) and parks his car. The police stop him and charge him for speeding and a number of traffic offences and proceed to interrogate him.
- Ashley Cole: Cole is visiting a music recording studio for a charity deal. The sound engineer's American partner then accuses him of deleting the track vocal parts and messing things up.
- Shaun Wright-Phillips: Wright-Phillips accidentally gets a waiter fired. (John Terry was supposed to be the victim but he found out after seeing the message in his wife's mobile phone explaining the prank. Terry then found Wright-Phillips as a substitute.)
- Peter Crouch: Crouch is offered an investment deal by an Indian businessman whose Russian business partners later barge in and demand money.
- Wayne Rooney: Rooney is visiting a dogs' home with his wife Colleen when a little boy's dog dies.
- David James: James goes to an art gallery and he is accused of breaking a piece of artwork made by a French artist.
- David Beckham: Beckham is picked up by a driver that takes a detour to make him late for his meeting.

== Accomplices ==
- Colleen McLoughlin (Wayne Rooney's girlfriend and now his wife, knew about prank)
- Ryan Giggs (in the Gary Neville prank)
- John Terry (gets Shaun Wright-Phillips involved)
- Robbie Fowler (in the Peter Crouch prank)
