= 9/11: Inside the President's War Room =

2021 documentary film

- Promotional poster
- Directed by: Adam Wishart
- Narrated by: Jeff Daniels
- Music by: Segun Akinola
- Production companies: Wish/Art Films; BBC One
- Distributed by: Apple TV+
- Release date: September 1, 2021
- Running time: 90 minutes
- Country: United States
- Language: English

9/11: Inside the President's War Room is a 2021 documentary about the September 11 attacks released by Apple TV+ and BBC One.

== Premise ==
The documentary explores the hours immediately after the attacks from the angle of President George W. Bush, and those around him, and its release was timed to coincide with the 20th anniversary of the attacks.

== Production ==
It includes interviews with President George W. Bush, Vice President Dick Cheney, Condoleezza Rice, Colin Powell, Andy Card, Dan Bartlett, Deborah Loewer, Josh Bolten, Ari Fleischer, Karl Rove, Air Force One pilot Mark Tillman, Ted Olson and others.

== Reception ==
James Jackson of The Times gave the documentary four out of five, writing that former president Bush's "presence alone made this latest hour-by hour rundown of 9/11 stand out among so many others, even if it felt like the Bush Legacy Foundation account of his defining day". Jack Seale of The Guardian gave it five out of five, writing that the documentary "gives the sensation of being in the room in a way that few documentaries ever have". David Lewis of the San Francisco Chronicle described the film as a "gripping documentary" and wrote: "It may not be the most balanced film you’ll ever see, but the editing and the photo assets are breathtaking, and it could be the last time that so many government officials at the center of this tragedy go on the record in one film."
