= Hugh Miles (filmmaker) =

British filmmaker

Hugh Miles is a British filmmaker who specialises in wildlife films.

Miles spent time in his school holidays - he attended King's Ely - working on conservation at RSPB reserves, and decided on a career as a wildlife filmmaker after watching Eric Ashby on television in the early 1960s. After first going to film college, Miles got a job at the Film Unit in Ealing and worked there for nearly nine years. Miles then joined the RSPB and was in charge of producing one hundred minutes of film a year. Miles went freelance in the mid-1970s, with his first job being to film for the BBC wildlife series Life on Earth.

Miles made use of a technique, learnt from J. A. Baker's book, The Peregrine, which allowed him to gain the trust of the animals he filmed. By wearing the same clothes and doing the same thing every day, he hoped that the animals would get used to him as part of the landscape and would eventually take no notice of his presence. This enabled him to get close to wild otters and pumas.

He has made programmes about angling: the film 'Tom's River', and the series 'A Passion for Angling' (1993) with Chris Yates and Bob James, and 'Catching the Impossible' (2009) with Martin Bowler, both narrated by Bernard Cribbins.

One of the films that Miles made is People of the Sea. After they had started filming, it became clear that there was a conservation story to be told about the decline of the cod stocks in Newfoundland, and they ended up making a programme that was different from the one that they had set out to make. The film went on to win awards for Best Conservation Film at Jackson Hole 1997 and Wildscreen 1998, and was also seen by the Premier of Newfoundland, who decided to put a copy in every school so that the children were brought up understanding their environment and the dangers of over exploitation of a wildlife resource.

He was awarded the Royal Geographical Society's Cherry Kearton Medal and Award in 1986, won a BAFTA TV award for Best Photography in 2000, shared with Chip Houseman, for Wildlife Special: Tiger; and was awarded the Panda for Outstanding Achievement at Wildscreen 2002.

In 2011, Hugh was awarded an honorary degree from the University for the Creative Arts.
