= Adam Wishart =

Documentary filmmaker

Adam Wishart (born 1969) is a documentary filmmaker. His professional background includes writing, directing, and appearing in various productions for BBC television projects.

== Professional background ==
=== Writing ===
Wishart's first book, Leaving Reality Behind, co-authored with historian Regula Bochsler was published in 2002, by Fourth Estate in the UK and HarperCollins in the United States. Leaving Reality Behind tells the history of what's become known as the Toywars – a battle between an online retailer and a group of European artists, which highlighted for the first time, the contradictions at the heart of the internet and ecommerce. The Financial Times said it was "an important story, as absorbing as a well crafted thriller". An extract from the book was published in The Guardian.

Wishart's second book, One in Three: A Son's Journey Into the History and Science of Cancer, was published in 2006 by Profile Books in the UK, by Grove Atlantic in America and translated and published into German, Finnish, Chinese, Icelandic and Japanese. The book told the story of David Wishart's battle against cancer. The story of David, the author's father, was interwoven with the history of cancer medicine over two millennia. The book was nominated for The Royal Society Book Award in 2007.

Simon Singh, in The Sunday Telegraph, said "Wishart succeeds brilliantly in constructing a narrative that is a tribute both to his father and the scientists who have partly unpacked the mystery of cancer." In a review for The Sunday Times, John Cornwell said that an "imaginative fusion of anecdotal detail, medical science and poignant, elegiac narrative marks every chapter of this unusual book".

Wishart appeared on Andrew Marr's Start the Week, on BBC Radio 4 to discuss the launch of One in Three.

=== Television ===
Wishart joined the BBC's Training Scheme in 1993, and went on to work as an assistant on Watchdog, Newsnight, Horizon, Tomorrow's World, Panorama, and Modern Times. As director, he made A Class Apart for the Back to the Floor series, which won the Royal Television Society Best Feature in 1997.

He directed one episode of the BAFTA-winning Blood on the Carpet series and was producer on the Trouble at the Big Top four-part series, following Peter Mandelson, as he pushed through the Millennium Dome project.

In 2006, he wrote, directed, and presented Monkeys, Rats and Me: Animal Testing for BBC2, which followed the battle against the Oxford Animal Lab, and which went on to win the Grierson Award for Best Science Documentary in 2007.

In 2008, he directed Warlords Next Door? for Channel 4, about Somalian warlords who perpetrate human rights abuses from their suburban homes in England, which won the Best World Political Documentary at the Banff World Television Festival in 2009.

In 2009, Wishart wrote, directed, and featured in The Price of Life for BBC2, about the rationing of high cost cancer drugs by the National Institute for Health and Clinical Excellence, which was nominated for Best Science Documentary in the Grierson Awards of 2009.

In 2010, Wishart wrote, directed and featured in #23 Week Babies: The Price of Life, broadcast on BBC2 at 9pm on 9 March 2011. The documentary followed several babies born four months early – 23 weeks gestation – in the neonatal ward at the Birmingham Women's Hospital. The Independent newspaper's review summarised the dilemma presented by the film.

Here's an unsettling Venn diagram. One circle encloses the set of fetuses that may, within the current law, be terminated. The other circle encloses the set of premature babies that, within current technology, can successfully be kept alive. And in the intersection – somewhere between week 23 and week 24 of a pregnancy – lie those babies that qualify both as abortable and savable – the subject of Adam Wishart's challenging film 23 Week Babies: the Price of Life.

The Telegraph review said that the film "took a taboo and broke it, gently, sensitively, but devastatingly".

The film attracted 1.903 million viewers for its terrestrial broadcast on BBC2, narrowly beating Jamie Oliver's Jamie's Dream School, which had 1.889 million viewers in the same time slot.

In 2021 he directed a documentary about the September 11 attacks called 9/11: Inside the President's War Room and released on the BBC and Apple TV+. The film won the Rose D'Or for Best European Documentary, Royal Television Society Award, Bulldog Award, Real Screen Award, Broadcast Magazine Award, it was runner up for the BAFTA. Danny Collins and Mark Hamill won the BAFTA for Best Editing. And Wishart himself won the Royal Television Society Award for Best Factual Directing.

== Published works ==
- Wishart, Adam; Regula Bochsler. Leaving Reality Behind, Ecco, 2002. ISBN 978-0-06-621076-6
- Wishart, Adam. One in Three: A Son's Journey Into the History and Science of Cancer, Grove Press, 2006. ISBN 978-0-8021-4348-8
