= Allan Segal =

British filmmaker (1941–2012)

Allan Segal also known as Allan Fear-Segal (16 April 1941 – 8 February 2012) was a BAFTA-winning documentary film maker. He spent the majority of his career working for Granada Television.

His house in Hampstead was a regular haunt of left-leaning intellectuals in the 1970s and 1980s; Michael Foot chose to film his first televised interview as Leader of the Labour Party (UK) from its kitchen.

== Biography ==
=== Television career ===
Having started his career at the BBC, in 1972 he was poached by Granada Television to act as a producer on the investigative current affairs programme World In Action. Over the next five years, he produced and directed over twenty films, all over the world, and often in hostile circumstances necessitating the use of hidden cameras and undercover filming.

In 1976, Segal and a small film crew risked life imprisonment by posing as tourists and illegally filming in Brezhnev's USSR. Using one of the first-ever amateur 8 mm film cameras, they shot "A Calculated Risk", the story of Jewish refusenik Natan Sharansky (who went on to become Deputy Prime Minister of Israel) and his campaign to leave for the state of Israel.

In 1979 Segal was appointed as Editor of World In Action. His editorship saw the broadcast of the notorious "The Steel Papers" programme, which prompted a House of Lords legal dispute, and almost led to his and several other Granada Television directors' imprisonment because of the programme's steadfast refusal to reveal the identity of the source of the confidential documents relating to the British Steel Corporation strike on which the programme was centred.

Between 1990 and 1992 Segal acted as the series editor of the international, multimillion-dollar documentary series "Dinosaur", presented by legendary CBS anchorman Walter Cronkite. The series aired in the United States on the A&E Network, on ORF in Austria, Primedia in Canada, SATEL in Germany and ITV in the UK. At the time, the series achieved the highest audience figures of any documentary shown on A&E, and remains one of the highest-rated documentary series of all time.

After his retirement from programme making Allan Segal taught as a university lecturer and Professor of Media Studies at the University of East Anglia, Norwich, Dickinson College, Carlisle, US, and Jamia Millia Islamia, Delhi, India.

=== Conflict Reporting ===
Many of Segal's films were shot from the frontline. In 1973, whilst reporting the Yom Kippur War, he was part of a convoy of ITV journalists that was narrowly missed by a Syrian wire-guided missile. David Elstein recorded in his memoir that the vehicles were only missed because a few moments prior to the missile strike Segal had insisted that the convoy be halted so that he could "relieve himself in the shade, under a tree". Nicholas Tomalin, a Sunday Times journalist, was killed by a similar anti-tank missile the next day.

Later in the same conflict, Segal was shot in the leg when his team came under machine gun fire from the Israel Defense Forces following a misidentification of the vehicle in which he was travelling in the Golan Heights.

=== Awards ===
Allan Segal's work won, amongst other accolades, two BAFTAs (for the films "Nuts and Bolts of the Economy" and "Made in Korea"), the Royal Television Society's Judges' Award for outstanding contribution to investigative journalism, the Broadcasting Press Guild's award for Best Documentary Series (for "Apartheid" in 1986), and a New York Film Festival Blue Ribbon.
