= British Academy Television Award for Best Factual Series or Strand =

Annual UK television award

British Academy Television Award
- Country: United Kingdom
- Presented by: British Academy of Film and Television Arts
- First award: 1954
- Currently held by: See No Evil (2026)
- Website: www.bafta.org

The British Academy Television Award for Best Factual Series or Strand is one of the major categories of the British Academy Television Awards (BAFTAs), the primary awards ceremony of the British television industry. The category is described on the official BAFTA website as "more than one factual programme linked through a unified approach, narrative or the thematic development of a subject matter."

Throughout the history of the awards there have been several categories with different names for factual television programming.

- From 1958 to 1969 was presented as an individual award named Best Factual while also from 1964 to 1966 other category was presented as Best Factual Personality.
- In 1971 and 1972 was awarded as Best Factual Production and then from 1973 to 1977 as Best Factual Programme.
- Finally since 1973 it has been awarded under the name of Best Factual Series or Best Factual Series or Strand.

== Winners and nominees ==
=== 1950s ===
Best Factual'

Year	Recipient(s)	Title
1958	Donald Baverstock and the production team	Tonight
1958	Production team	Tonight

=== 1960s ===
Best Factual

Year	Recipient(s)	Title
1960	Denis Mitchell	
1961	Michael Redington	
1962	Tim Hewat	
1963	Richard Cawston	
1964	Peter Morley, Cyril Bennett	
1965	Production team	World in Action
1966	Jeremy Isaacs and the production team	This Week
1966	Cyril Bennett	Division; This Week; Three After Six; Paradise Street
1966	Paul Fox	General Election Coverage
1966	Tim Slessor	So You Think You Can Drive; Jungle Green; Glorious Sail
1966	Sports Unit	Presentation of Olympic Material
1967	Production team	24 Hours
1968	Desmond Wilcox, Bill Morton	
1969	Phillip Whitehead and the production team	This Week

Best Factual Personality

Year	Recipient(s)
1964	Bernard Braden
1965	Alan Whicker
1966	Malcolm Muggeridge

=== 1970s ===
Best Factual Production

Year	Title	Recipient(s)
1971	The Tribe That Hides from Man	Adrian Cowell
1971	Horizon	Peter Goodchild and the production team
1971	Man Alive	Desmond Wilcox, Bill Morton and the production team
1971	Man Alive: Gale is Dead	Jenny Barraclough
1971	Wildlife Safari in Ethiopia	Jeffery Boswall
1971	World in Action	Production team
1972	Man Alive: Women in Prison	Jenny Barraclough
1972	World in Action	Jeremy Wallington and the production team
1972	Born To Be Small	Tony Snowdon, Derek Hart
1972	Hollywood – Dowager in Hot Pants	Jack Gold
1972	Horizon	Peter Goodchild
1972	Man Alive	Desmond Wilcox, Bill Morton and the production team
1972	Surrender to Everest	Antony Thomas, Ned Kelly

Best Factual Programme

Year	Title	Recipient(s)
1973	Horizon: "The Making of a Natural History Film"	Mick Rhodes
1973	The Block	Paul Watson
1973	The Commanders: Rommel	Harry Hastings
1974	Last Night, Another Soldier…	Eric Davidson
1974	Horizon: "What Time Is Your Body?"	Dominic Flessati
1974	Metroland	Edward Mirzoeff
1974	The Year of the Torturer	Stephen Clark, Leslie Woodhead
1975	Beauty, Bonny, Daisy, Violet, Grace and Geoffrey Morton	Frank Cvitanovich
1975	The Bomb Disposal Men	Jenny Barraclough
1975	The Opium Warlords	Adrian Cowell
1975	The World at War: "Genocide"	Michael Darlow
1976	Johnny Go Home	John Willis
1976	Auschwitz, The Final Solution	Michael Darlow
1976	Everest The Hard Way	Ned Kelly, Christopher Ralling
1976	This Week: "Dying for a Fag"	David Elstein
1977	Sailor: "The Rescue"	John Purdie
1977	The Battle of the Somme	Malcolm Brown
1977	Spirit Of The Place – Laurence Durrell's Greece	Peter Adam
1977	The World About Us: "Lions of the Serengeti"	Hugo van Lawick
1977	The World About Us: "Night of the Fox"	Peter Bale

Best Factual Series

Year	Title	Recipient(s)
1973	Horizon	Peter Goodchild and the production team
1973	America	Michael Gill
1973	Man Alive	Desmond Wilcox and the production team
1974	World in Action	Gus Macdonald
1974	America: "Episodes 8–13"	Michael Gill
1974	Horizon	Bruce Norman
1974	The World at War: "Episodes 1–8"	Jeremy Isaacs
1975	Horizon	Peter Goodchild, Bruce Norman
1975	Disappearing World	Brian Moser
1975	The World About Us	Anthony Isaacs, Christopher Parsons
1975	The World at War: "Episodes 9–26"	Jeremy Isaacs
1976	Disappearing World	Brian Moser
1976	Horizon	Peter Goodchild
1976	News at Ten	Nigel Ryan
1976	Survival	Colin Willock
1976	The World About Us	Anthony Isaacs, Christopher Parsons
1977	Sailor	John Purdie, Roger Mills
1977	Disappearing World	Brian Moser
1977	Horizon	Peter Goodchild
1977	The World About Us	Michael Andrews, Anthony Isaacs, Christopher Parsons
1978	The South African Experience	Antony Thomas
1978	Disappearing World	Brian Moser
1978	Horizon	Simon Campbell-Jones
1978	Royal Heritage	Michael Gill
1978	The World About Us	Michael Andrews, Anthony Isaacs
1979	The Voyage of Charles Darwin	Christopher Ralling
1979	The Body in Question: "Episodes 1–7"	Patrick Uden
1979	The Hong Kong Beat	John Purdie
1979	Horizon	Simon Campbell-Jones

=== 1980s ===
Best Factual Series

Year	Title	Recipient(s)
1980	Circuit 11 Miami	Mark Anderson
1980	Life on Earth	John Sparks, Richard Brock
1980	The Magic of Dance	Patricia Foy
1980	The World About Us	Anthony Isaacs, Michael Andrews
1981	Strangeways	Rex Bloomstein
1981	Great Railway Journeys of the World	Roger Laughton
1981	Hollywood	Kevin Brownlow, David Gill
1981	Ireland: A Television History: "Episodes 1–5"	Jeremy Isaacs
1981	Public School	Richard Denton
1982	Ireland: A Television History: "Episodes 5–13"	Jeremy Isaacs
1982	Fighter Pilot	Colin Strong
1982	Forty Minutes	Roger Mills
1982	Wildlife on One	Peter Bale
1982	The World About Us	Peter Jones, Anthony Isaacs
1983	Police	Roger Graef, Charles Stewart
1983	The Flight of the Condor	Michael Andrews
1983	Forty Minutes	Roger Mills
1983	Horizon	Graham Massey
1984	Forty Minutes	Roger Mills
1984	Unknown Chaplin	David Gill, Kevin Brownlow
1984	Wildlife on One	Peter Bale
1984	The World About Us	Anthony Isaacs, Peter Jones
1985	River Journeys	Roger Laughton, David Wallace
1985	Crime Inc	John Edwards, Martin Short
1985	Forty Minutes	Roger Mills
1985	The Heart of the Dragon	Peter Montagnon
1986	Forty Minutes	Edward Mirzoeff, Roger Mills
1986	Comrades	Richard Denton
1986	Kingdom of the Ice Bear	Hugh Miles, Mike Salisbury
1986	Whicker's World: Living with Uncle Sam	Jonathan Stedall
1987	World in Action	Ray Fitzwalter
1987	British Cinema: Personal View	David Gill, Kevin Brownlow
1987	Crimewatch	Sam Organ, Peter Chafer
1987	First Tuesday	John Willis
1987	Forty Minutes	Edward Mirzoeff
1987	Horizon	Robin Brightwell
1987	The South Bank Show	Melvyn Bragg
1988	The Duty Men	Paul Hamann
1988	Arena	Nigel Finch, Anthony Wall
1988	The RKO Story: Tales from Hollywood	Charles Chabot, Rosemary Wilton
1988	Forty Minutes	Edward Mirzoeff
1989	Arena	Anthony Wall, Nigel Finch
1989	Forty Minutes	Edward Mirzoeff
1989	The South Bank Show	Melvyn Bragg
1989	Supersense	John Downer

=== 1990s ===
Best Factual Series

Year	Title	Recipient(s)
1990	Forty Minutes	Edward Mirzoeff
1990	Arena	Nigel Finch, Anthony Wall
1990	Around the World in 80 Days	Clem Vallance, Roger Mills
1990	World in Action	Stuart Prebble
1991	The Trials of Life	Peter Jones
1991	Arena	Nigel Finch, Anthony Wall
1991	Disappearing World	David Wason
1991	First Tuesday	Grant McKee
1991	Forty Minutes	Caroline Pick
1992	Naked Hollywood	Nicolas Kent
1992	Arena	Nigel Finch, Anthony Wall
1992	Dispatches	David Lloyd
1992	First Tuesday	Grant McKee
1992	Forty Minutes	Caroline Pick
1993	Pandora's Box	Adam Curtis
1993	Doctors to Be	Edward Briffa
1993	Inside Story	Steve Hewlett, Paul Hamann
1993	Secret History	John Willis
1994	The Ark	Molly Dineen
1994	Cutting Edge	Peter Moore
1994	First Tuesday	Chris Bryer
1994	Life in the Freezer	Alastair Fothergill
1995	Beyond the Clouds	Phil Agland
1995	Cutting Edge	Peter Moore
1995	Equinox	Sara Ramsden
1995	Hollywood Kids	Jilly Hafenrichter
1996	The Death of Yugoslavia	Norma Percy
1996	Dispatches	David Lloyd
1996	Network First	Stuart Prebble, John Blake
1996	The Private Life of Plants	Mike Salisbury
1997	The House	Michael Waldman, Andrew Bethell
1997	Cutting Edge	Peter Moore
1997	People's Century	Peter Pagnamenta
1997	The System	Peter Dale
1998	The Nazis: A Warning from History	Laurence Rees
1998	Breaking Point	Peter Gordon, Amanda Richardson
1998	Hotel	Neil Grant, Belinda Cherrington
1998	Royals and Reptiles	Leonie Jameson, Denys Blakeway
1999	The Human Body	Richard Dale
1999	The Clintons: A Marriage of Power	Paul Mitchell
1999	Cold War	Martin Smith
1999	The Life of Birds	Mike Salisbury

=== 2000s ===
Best Factual Series or Strand

Year	Title	Recipient(s)	Broadcaster
2000	The Mayfair Set	Adam Curtis	BBC Two
2000	Manhunt – The Search for the Yorkshire Ripper	Ray Fitzwalter, Michael Bilton, Gwyneth Hughes	ITV
2000	The Second World War in Colour	Martin Smith, Alastair Waddington, Stewart Binns	ITV
2000	Shanghai Vice	Phil Agland	Channel 4
2001	Britain at War in Colour	Lucy Carter, Stewart Binns, Adrian Wood	ITV
2001	Horizon	Bettina Lerner, John Lynch	BBC Two
2001	Castaway 2000	Jeremy Mills, Chris Kelly	BBC One
2001	Fifteen	Oliver Morse, Daisy Asquith, Nichola Koratjitis	Channel 4
2002	Horizon	Bettina Lerner, Matthew Barrett, John Lynch	BBC Two
2002	The Blue Planet		BBC One
2002	Welcome To Britain	Edwina Vardey, Rachel Coughlan	BBC One
2002	Langan Behind the Lines	Bob Long, Rachel Foster, Ben Summers	BBC Two
2003	Awarded in the Specialised Programme or Series category		
2004	Awarded in the Specialised Programme or Series category		
2005	The Power of Nightmares		BBC Two
2005	Brat Camp	Jamie Isaacs, Tamara Abood, Sam Whittaker	Channel 4
2005	Himalaya with Michael Palin		BBC One
2005	Who Do You Think You Are?		BBC Two
2006	Jamie's School Dinners	Andrew Conrad, Robert Thirkell, Dominique Walker	Channel 4
2006	Coast		BBC Two
2006	Cocaine	Guillermo Galdos, David Notman-Watt, Angus Macqueen	Channel 4
2006	49 Up	Bill Jones, Claire Lewis, Michael Apted	ITV
2007	Ross Kemp on Gangs	Clive Tulloh, Amelia Hann, Ross Kemp	Sky One
2007	Stephen Fry: The Secret Life of the Manic Depressive		BBC Two
2007	Tribe	James Smith, Steve Robinson, Bruce Parry, Sam Organ	BBC Two
2007	Who Do You Think You Are?	Alex Graham, Lucy Carter	BBC Two
2008	The Tower: A Tale of Two Cities	Simon Ford, Rachel Innes-Lumsden, Anthony Wonke, Ines Cavill	BBC One
2008	Meet the Natives	Gavin Searle, Will Anderson, Andrew Palmer, Chris King	Channel 4
2008	Tribe	Steve Robinson, Bruce Parry, Sam Organ	BBC Two
2008	Paul Merton in China	Paul Sommers, Mark Chapman, Barbie MacLaurin, Paul Merton	Five
2009	Amazon with Bruce Parry		BBC Two
2009	Blood, Sweat and T-shirts	Mark Rubens, Tim Quicke, Jo Bishop	BBC Three
2009	The Family		Channel 4
2009	Ross Kemp in Afghanistan	Clive Tulloh, John Conroy, Matt Bennett, Ross Kemp	Sky One

=== 2010s ===
Year	Title	Recipient(s)	Broadcaster
2010	One Born Every Minute		Channel 4
2010	Blood, Sweat and Takeaways	Mark Rubens, Tim Quicke, James Christie-Miller, Jo Bishop	BBC Three
2010	The Family	David Clews, Beejal-Maya Patel, Jonathan Smith, Sanjay Singhal	Channel 4
2010	Who Do You Think You Are?	Elizabeth Dobson, Colette Flight, Lucy Carter, Alex Graham	BBC Two
2011	Welcome to Lagos	Will Anderson, Gavin Searle, Chris King, Andrew Palmer	BBC Two
2011	Coppers	Simon Ford, Ben Rumney, Anthony Philipson, Tim Wardle	Channel 4
2011	One Born Every Minute	Sanjay Singhal, Peter Moore, Lorraine Charker-Phillips, Lucy Bowden	Channel 4
2011	The Young Ones	Leanne Klein, Tom McDonald, Michael Jochnowitz	BBC One
2012	Our War		BBC Three
2012	The Choir: Military Wives	Tim Carter, Stephen Finnigan, Lucy Hillman, Gareth Malone	BBC Two
2012	Protecting Our Children	Emma Burman, Petra Graf, Anna McGill, Sacha Mirzoeff	BBC Two
2012	Educating Essex	David Clews, Andrew Mackenzie-Betty, Beejal-Maya Patel, Grace Reynolds	Channel 4
2013	Our War		BBC Three
2013	24 Hours in A&E	Nick Curwin, Tom McDonald, Kirsty Cunningham, Rita Daniels	Channel 4
2013	Make Bradford British	Richard McKerrow, Heenan Bhatti, Martin Fuller, Simon Evans	Channel 4
2013	Great Ormond Street		BBC Two
2014	Bedlam		Channel 4
2014	The Route Masters: Running London's Roads	Edmund Coulthard, Alistair Pegg, Matt Pelly, Simon Gilchrist	BBC Two
2014	Keeping Britain Alive: The NHS in a Day		BBC Two
2014	Educating Yorkshire	David Brindley, Grace Reynolds, David Clews, Andrew Mackenzie-Betty	Channel 4
2015	Life and Death Row		BBC Three
2015	15,000 Kids and Counting	Chris Eley, Brian Woods, Gwyn Jones, Fiona Jones	Channel 4
2015	Educating the East End	Andrew Mackenzie-Betty, David Clews, Jo Hughes, Liz Hazell	Channel 4
2015	Protecting Our Parents	Julian Mercer, Rob Miller, Alice Perman, Jonathan Taylor	BBC Two
2016	The Murder Detectives	Ben Brown, Bart Corpe, Neil Grant, Dave Nath	Channel 4
2016	The Detectives	Colin Barr, Ruth Kelly, James Newton, Rupert Houseman	BBC Two
2016	Great Ormond Street	Dollan Cannell, Catey Sexton, Lucy Hillman	BBC Two
2016	The Tribe		Channel 4
2017	Exodus: Our Journey to Europe		BBC Two
2017	24 Hours in Police Custody		Channel 4
2017	Kids on the Edge		Channel 4
2017	The Prosecutors: Real Crime and Punishment	Blue Ryan, Sara Hardy, Sacha Baveystock, Gwyn Jones	BBC Four
2018	Ambulance	Jo Hughes, Bruce Fletcher, Kirsty Cunningham, Simon Ford	BBC One
2018	Catching a Killer		BBC Two
2018	Hospital		BBC Two
2018	Drugsland	Sacha Mirzoeff, Xavier Alford, Bart Corpe, Simon Ford	BBC Three|
2019	Louis Theroux's Altered States		BBC Two
2019	24 Hours in A&E		Channel 4
2019	Prison	Richard Melman, Paddy Wivell, Kathy Myers, Jack Wood	Channel 4
2019	Life and Death Row: The Mass Execution	Miles Blayden-Ryall, Alistair Martin, Becky Casey, Aysha Rafaele	BBC Three

=== 2020s ===
Year	Title	Recipient(s)	Broadcaster
2020	Leaving Neverland	Dan Reed	Channel 4
2020	Don't F**k with Cats: Hunting an Internet Killer	Mark Lewis, Felicity Morris, Michael Harte, Dimitri Doganis	Netflix
2020	Crime and Punishment	Emily Lawson, Bruce Fletcher, Jemma Chisnall, Mark Raphael	Channel 4
2020	Our Dementia Choir with Vicky McClure		BBC One
2021	Once Upon a Time in Iraq	James Bluemel, Jo Abel, Miriam Walsh, Simon Sykes, Andrew Palmer, Will Anderson	BBC Two
2021	Crime and Punishment		Channel 4
2021	Losing it: Our Metal Health Emergency		Channel 4
2021	Hospital		BBC Two
2022	Uprising		BBC One
2022	9/11: One Day in America	Caroline Marsden, Daniel Bogado, TJ Martin, Dan Lindsay, David Glover	National Geographic
2022	Undercover Police: Hunting Paedophiles	Joe Mather, Simon Ford, Jamie Pickup, Mark Casebow, Charlie MacDonald, Juliet Piper	Channel 4
2022	The Detectives: Fighting Organised Crime		BBC Two
2023	Libby, Are You Home Yet?	Anna Hall, Josephine Besbrode, Luke Rothery, Danielle Jones, Celia Jennison	Sky Crime
2023	Jeremy Kyle Show: Death on Daytime	Kira Phillips, Barry Ronan, Rosina Andreou, Graeme McAulay, Abi Walker, Charlie MacDonald	Channel 4
2023	Vatican Girl: The Disappearance of Emanuela Orlandi	Mark Lewis, Dimitri Doganis, Tom Barry, Chiara Messineo, Simon Mills, Kaylin Simmons	Netflix
2023	Worlds Collide: The Manchester Bombing		ITV
2024	Lockerbie	Nancy Strang, John Dower, Claire McFall, Barnaby Fry, Dejan Cancar, Charlie Hawryliw	Sky Documentaries
2024	Evacuation		Channel 4
2024	Dublin Narcos	Benedict Sanderson, Claire McFall, Sacha Baveystock, Edmund Coulthard, Megan Taylor, Laura Dunne	Sky Documentaries
2024	Once Upon a Time in Northern Ireland		BBC Two
2025	To Catch a Copper	Hugo Pettitt, Ashley Francis-Roy, Bruce Fletcher, Peter Beard, Colette Hodges, Martin Thompson	Channel 4
2025	Freddie Flintoff's Field of Dreams on Tour	Andrew MacKenzie-Betty, Naomi Templeton, Annie Hughes, Anna Strickland, Peter Benn, Drew Hill	BBC One
2025	The Push: Murder on the Cliff	Anna Hall, Josephine Besbrode, Luke Rothery, Tom Whitaker, Kate Reid, Josh Carpenter	Channel 4
2025	American Nightmare	Bernadette Higgins, Fiona Stourton, Rebecca North, Alasdair Bayne, Anton Short, Felicity Morris	Netflix
2026	See No Evil		Channel 4
2026	Bibaa and Nicole: Murder in the Park		Sky Documentaries
2026	Educating Yorkshire		Channel 4
2026	The Undercover Police Scandal: Love and Lies Exposed	Lucy Wilcox, Charlie Webb, Kelly Nobay, Rebecca North, Liesel Evans, Letisha Kidza	ITV1

- Note: The series that don't have recipients on the tables had Production team credited as recipients for the award or nomination.
