= Şeref Taşlıova =

Şerafettin Taşliova (10 April 1938 – 20 September 2014) was a Turkish storyteller in the asik bardic tradition.

Taşliova won many prizes at bardic contests for improvised poetry and storytelling; many at international level. He had also been awarded by UNESCO. He started writing poetry around the age of ten and was widely recognised for his ability to tell epic tales, being one of the most prominent figures in the northeastern Anatolian tradition of minstrelsy,

He was a prolific published author of poetry, and has also recorded many albums of his poetry and bardic stories.

Taşliova also had a long career in broadcasting. He made appearances on a number of Turkish television stations, and had been making a regular radio broadcast since 1966. He also appeared in the Michael Wood BBC documentaries In Search of the Trojan War (1985) and In the Footsteps of Alexander the Great (1997), in which he demonstrates the oral traditions of the storyteller.

== Early life ==
He was born in the village of Pekşeren (Gülyüzü), in the district of Çıldır in the Ardahan Province, on April 10, 1938. His name translates as "honor".

On September 13, 2014, he was carried to the Dışkapı Yıldırım Beyazıt Training and Research Hospital. A week later, after undergoing surgery, Taşlıova died on September 20, 2014.

== Wider recognition ==
In 1986, the Turkish Ministry of Culture and Tourism established a database of living folk poets, 557 âşıks were registered in the database including Şeref Taşlıova. On the 4 July 2008 and using this database, Taşlıova was identified and nominated for UNESCO living human treasure. These were the words of Şeref Taşlıova:

I have received many awards, but this is by far the most valuable for me. I carried the others on my chest; this one I shall carry around on my head.

== Albums ==
- Wonderful, 1967
- TürküOla, 1976
- Wonderful, 1986

== Books ==
- Taşlıova, Şeref (1990). Gönül deryası [The Heart Garden] (in Turkish). Ankara: Kültür Bakanlığı Halk Kültürünü Araştırma Dairesi. p. 81.
