= 1997 British Academy Television Awards =

UK television awards ceremony

- Date: 29 April 1997
- Site: Royal Albert Hall
- Hosted by: Lenny Henry

Highlights
- Best Comedy Series: Only Fools and Horses
- Best Drama: EastEnders
- Best Actor: Nigel Hawthorne; The Fragile Heart
- Best Actress: Gina McKee; Our Friends in the North
- Best Comedy Performance: David Jason Only Fools and Horses

The 1997 British Academy Television Awards were held on 29 April at the Royal Albert Hall in London, as a joint ceremony with the British Academy Film Awards and was hosted by Lenny Henry. To date, it is the last occasion upon which the two sets of awards have been given jointly at the same event; from 1998, the Film and Television Awards were given at separate ceremonies for the first time since 1968.

== Winners and nominees ==
Winners are listed first and highlighted in boldface; the nominees are listed below.

Best Drama Series	Best Drama Serial
**EastEnders (BBC / BBC1)**; Ballykissangel (Ballykea / BBC Northern Ireland / World Productions / BBC1); Hamish Macbeth (BBC Scotland / Skyline Films / Zenith Entertainment Ltd / BBC1); This Life (World Productions / BBC2)	**Our Friends in the North (BBC2)**; The Crow Road (BBC Scotland / Union Pictures Productions / BBC2); The Fragile Heart (Carnival Films / Channel 4); Gulliver's Travels (Jim Henson Productions / RHI Entertainment Inc / Channel 4)
Best Actor	Best Actress
**Nigel Hawthorne** – **The Fragile Heart (Channel 4)**; Christopher Eccleston – Our Friends in the North (BBC2); Albert Finney – Karaoke / Cold Lazarus (BBC1 / Channel 4); Peter Vaughan – Our Friends in the North (BBC2)	**Gina McKee** – **Our Friends in the North (BBC2)**; Alex Kingston – The Fortunes and Misfortunes of Moll Flanders (ITV); Helen Mirren – Prime Suspect 5 (ITV); Pauline Quirke – The Sculptress (BBC1)
Best Comedy (Programme or Series)	Best Comedy Performance
**Only Fools and Horses (BBC / BBC1)**; Absolutely Fabulous (BBC / BBC1); Father Ted (Hat Trick Productions / Channel 4); Game On (Hat Trick Productions / BBC2)	**David Jason** – **Only Fools and Horses (BBC1)**; Martin Clunes – Men Behaving Badly (BBC1); Joanna Lumley – Absolutely Fabulous (BBC1); Nicholas Lyndhurst – Only Fools and Horses (BBC1)
Best Single Drama	Best Factual Series
**Hillsborough (Granada Television / ITV)**; Crossing the Floor (BBC / BBC2); The Precious Blood (BBC Northern Ireland / BBC2); Some Kind of Life (Granada Television / ITV)	**The House (BBC2)**; Cutting Edge (Channel 4); People's Century (BBC / WGBH / BBC2); The System (BBC / BBC2)
Best Light Entertainment Programme or Series	Best Light Entertainment Performance
**Shooting Stars (BBC / BBC2)**; The Fast Show (BBC / BBC2); Rory Bremner - Who Else? (Kudos Film & Television / Channel 4); Ruby Wax Meets (BBC / BBC1)	**John Bird & John Fortune – Rory Bremner - Who Else? / The Long Johns (Channel 4)**; Caroline Aherne – The Mrs Merton Christmas Show (BBC1); Rory Bremner – Rory Bremner - Who Else? (Channel 4); Paul Merton – Have I Got News for You (BBC2)
Best News Coverage	Best Talk Show
**Newsnight – BSE Coverage (BBC / BBC2)**; Newsnight – Dunblane Massacre (BBC / BBC2); News at Ten — Dunblane Massacre (ITN / ITV); Channel 4 News – Refugee Crisis in Zaire and Rwanda (ITN / Channel 4)	**The Mrs Merton Christmas Show (Granada Television / BBC1)**; Esther (BBC / BBC2); Late Review (BBC / BBC2); Weekly Planet (Wall to Wall Television / Channel 4)
Flaherty Award for Best Single Documentary	Huw Wheldon Award for Arts Programme or Series
**Horizon – Fermat's Last Theorem (BBC / BBC2)**; Elton John: Tantrums & Tiaras (Rocket Pictures / Carlton Television / ITV); Cutting Edge — The Home (Channel 4); Timewatch – Remember Aberfan (BBC / BBC2)	**Leaving Home (Channel 4)**; A History of British Art (BBC / BBC2); American Visions (BBC / Planet 24 Productions / Time / WNET / BBC2); Dancing in the Street: A Rock and Roll History (BBC Bristol / BBC2)
Best Sports / Events Coverage in Real Time	Best Foreign Programme Award
**Euro 96 Coverage (BBC / BBC1)**; Formula One Grand Prix Racing (BBC / BBC2); Monday Night Football (Sky Sports); Remembrance Sunday — The Cenotaph (BBC / BBC1)	**Murder One**
The Lew Grade Award	The Dennis Potter Award
**Coronation Street**	**Peter Flannery**
The Alan Clarke Award	The Richard Dimbleby Award
**Michael Wearing**	**Robert Hughes**

=== Craft Awards ===
Best Costume Design	Best Original Television Music
**Gulliver’s Travels** – **Shirley Russell**; Moll Flanders – Trisha Biggar; The Tenant of Wildfell Hall – Rosalind Ebbutt; Our Friends in the North – James Keast	**Moll Flanders** – **Jim Parker**; Cruel Train – Nick Bicat; Ballykissangel – Shaun Davey; The Crow Road – Colin Towns
Best Design	Best Make-Up
**Gulliver’s Travels** – **Roger Hall**; Rhodes – Maurice Cain; Moll Flanders – Stephen Fineren; The Tenant of Wildfell Hall – Sarah Greenwood	**The Tenant of Wildfell Hall** – **Jean Speak**; Rory Bremner, Who Else? – Helen Barratt; Jane Austen’s Emma – Mary Hillman; French and Saunders – Darren Phillips
Best Photography - Factual	Best Photography and Lighting - Fiction
**True Stories: Crime Of The Wolf** – **Sergei Astakhov, Alexander Ustinov**; Great Ormond Street – Camera Team; The House – Chris Cox, Paul Otter; American Visions – Allan Palmer	**Final Passage** – **Nic Knowland**; Our Friends in the North – John Daly, John Kenway, Simon Kossoff; Truth Or Dare – Richard Greatrex; The Tenant of Wildfell Hall – Daf Hobson
Best Editing - Factual	Best Editing - Fiction/Entertainment
**The System** – **Edward Roberts And Editing Team**; Making Babies – Howard Billingham; The House – Jim Latham, Sean Mackenzie; Great Ormond Street – Brian Tagg	**Hillsborough** – **Barry Vince**; Gulliver’s Travels – Peter Coulson; The Crow Road – Angus Newton; The Fragile Heart – Neil Thomson
Best Sound - Factual	Best Sound - Fiction/Entertainment
**Blues and Twos** – **Bob Jackson, Chris Pancott, Steve Blincoe**; True Stories: Crime of The Wolf – Leonid Gavrichenko, Alexander Grusdev; Great Railway Journeys – Team; Soho Stories – Chris Terrill, Keith Wilkinson, George Foulgham	**Hillsborough** – **Phil Smith and Team**; The Crow Road – Colin Nicolson, Mark August, Colin Martin; Kiss and Tell – Team; Our Friends in the North – Team
Best Graphic Design
**Channel 4 Stings For Children’s Channel 4** – **Luis Cook, Helen Nabarro**; Secret History Titles – John Kennedy; People's Century – Iain Macdonald, Alan Jeapes; Trail for National Poetry Day – Charlie Mawer, Ahmet Ahmet

=== Special awards ===
- **Charles F. Wheeler**
