= Eugene N. Borza =

American historian (1935–2021)

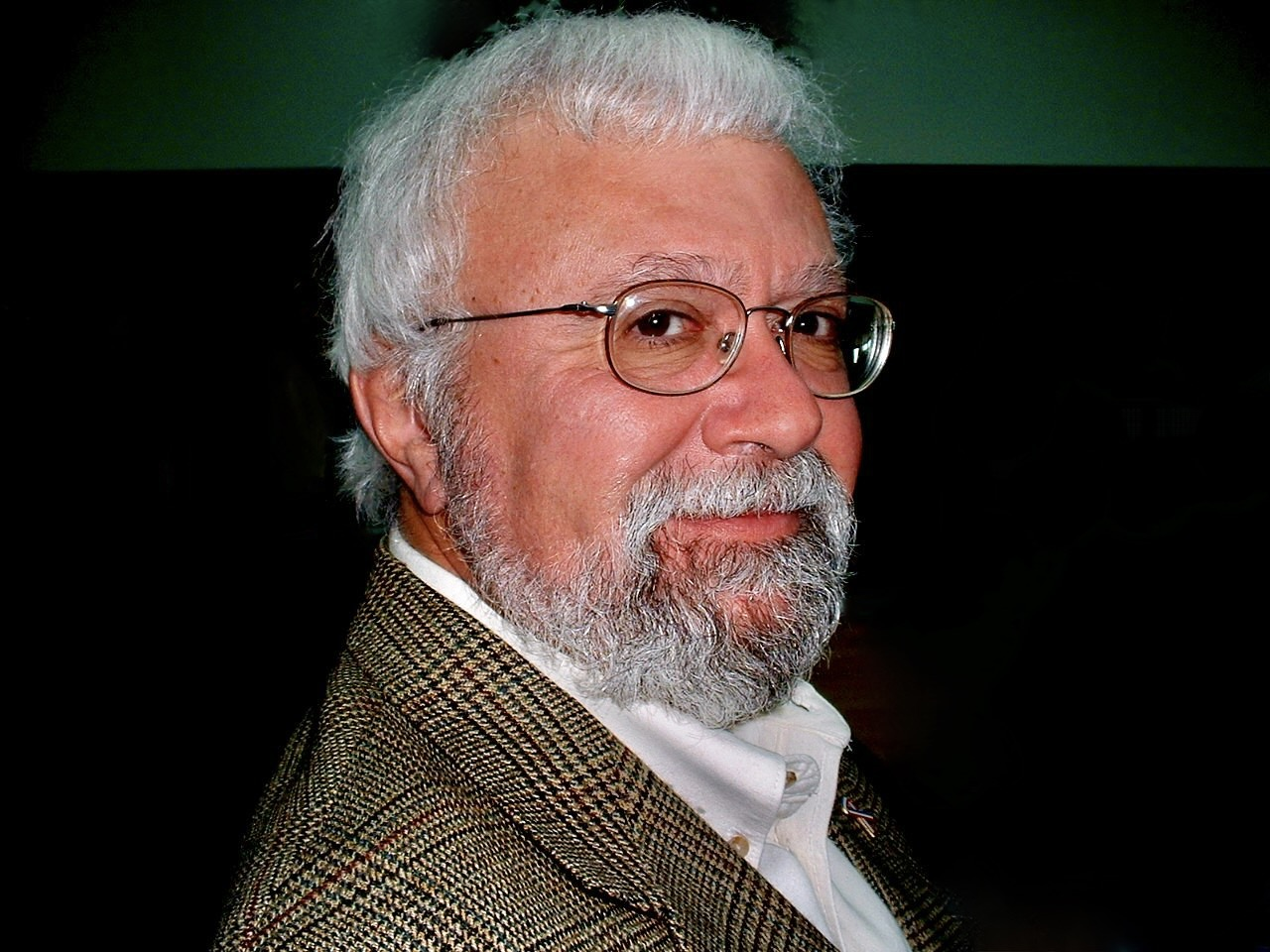
Eugene N. Borza

Eugene Nicholas Borza (March 3, 1935 – September 5, 2021) was a professor of ancient history at Pennsylvania State University, where he taught from 1964 until 1995.

== Academic career ==
Born in Cleveland, Ohio, USA, Borza came from a family of immigrants from Romania. Borza wrote extensively on the ancient kingdom of Macedonia, his most notable publication In the Shadow of Olympus (1990, Princeton). He was a guest lecturer for the In the introductory chapter of Makedonika by Carol G. Thomas. He has also been called the dean of US scholars on ancient Macedonia, and served as president of the Association of Ancient Historians for six years, from 1984 to 1989, and was a national lecturer for the Archaeological Institute of America (AIA) for 40 years. He was appointed as visiting professor at the University of Colorado, Boulder; The American School of Classical Studies at Athens; the University of Washington; Trinity University; and Carlton College. He especially enjoyed serving as historical advisor to the National Gallery of Art's groundbreaking exhibition, The Search for Alexander, in 1981.

=== Views ===
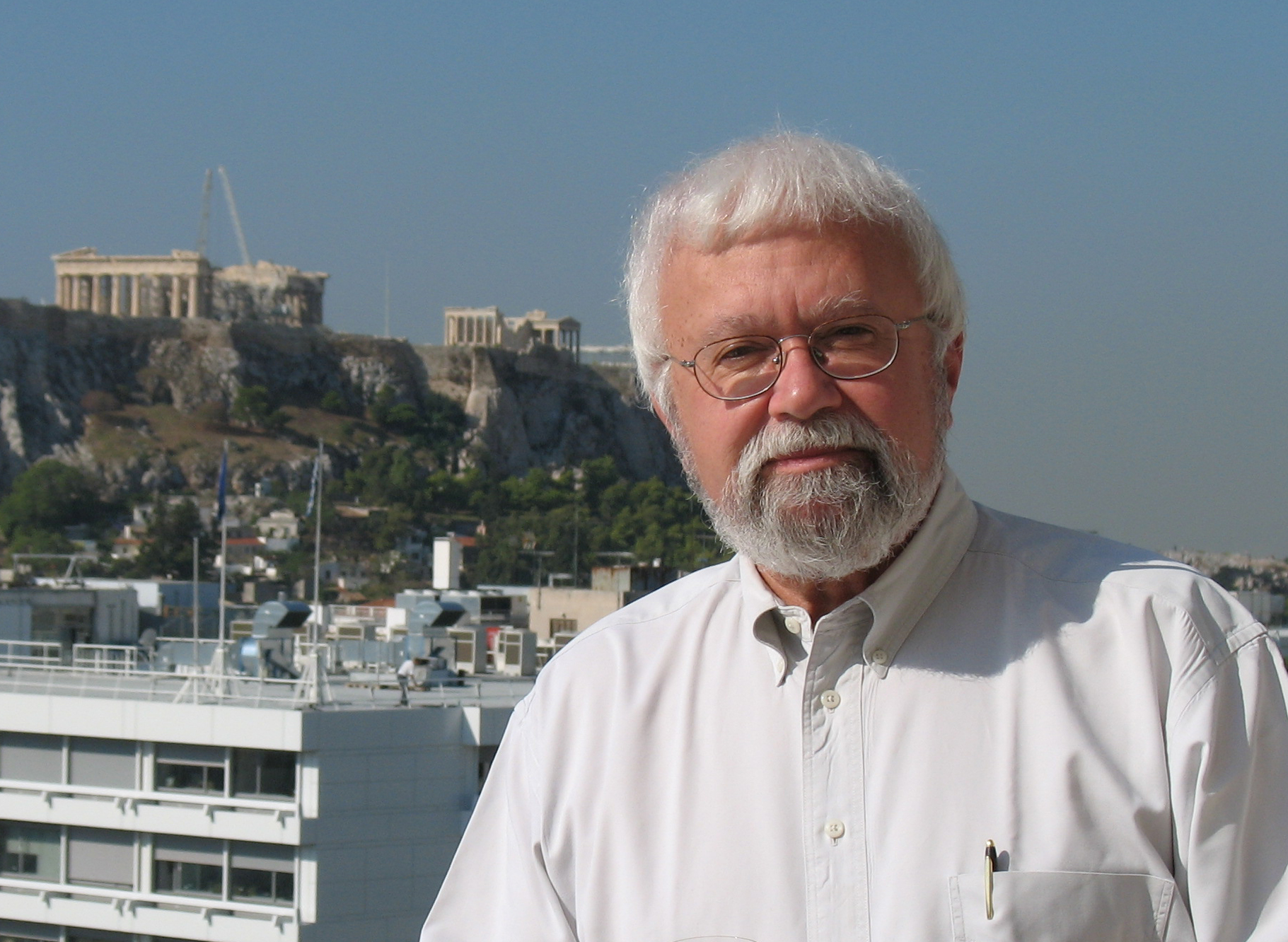
Eugene Borza at the Acropolis of Athens, Greece (2006)

Like Ernst Badian and Peter Green, (sometimes grouped together as Badian-Green-Borza) Borza doubted that the ancient Macedonians had Hellenic roots. Borza wrote that: "they may or may not have been Greek in whole or in part—while an interesting anthropological sidelight—is really not crucial to our understanding of their history" and that they "may have had Greek origins" (through proto-Greek populations), but that "the Macedonians emerged as a people recognized as distinct from their Greek and Balkan neighbors". Simon Hornblower summarizes: "Borza's answer to the sub-question 'were they Greeks?' is 'yes and no'; what he insists on is that the Macedonians saw themselves as distinct". While he made mention of the theory that the 'highlanders' or 'Makedones' of the mountainous regions of western Macedonia may have been derived from northwest Greek stock, he also stated that, in regard to any "possible links connecting the Macedonians to other Greek tribes....given the nature of the evidence, it is doubtful that such a connection can ever be proven or denied conclusively."

Borza did not believe that modern political nation-states in the Balkans (e.g. Greece, North Macedonia, Bulgaria) could establish "cultural continuity" with ancient Macedonia, and he dismissed any notion of there being a genetic link between modern-day Balkan nations and the ancient Macedonian people, dismissing "genetic purity" as "pure fantasy." Regarding such claims by modern Greeks, he noted that "for most of the 2,600 years since the genesis of the ancient Macedonian kingdom ethnic Greeks have been a minority" and that "the overwhelming Hellenic impact on Greek Macedonia is largely the result of the settlements and population exchanges of the early 1920s." Regarding modern ethnic Macedonians, he regarded them as a "newly emergent people" and held the view that they couldn't establish a link with antiquity because "Slavs entered the Balkans centuries after the demise of the ancient Macedonian kingdom." It was his view that any alleged link to the ancient Macedonian kingdom was a product of regional political factors, not genetic or cultural. At the same time, Borza also believed that contemporary Macedonian ethnicity came about not as an "invention" of Tito or the Communist party of Yugoslavia but rather as a result of a natural and organic process of "nation-building". It had begun in the late nineteenth century as an offshoot of the joint Macedonian and Bulgarian struggle against Hellenization and reached it "culmination" under Tito's policies after WWII.

His views and skepticism on the ethnicity of the ancient Macedonians, rejected by the Greek government, led to the Greek refusal to allow him to film with British historian Michael Wood for the 1998 BBC television series In the Footsteps of Alexander the Great inside Greece.

In 2008, he received a festschrift published in his honor. His works have received both praise and criticism from a variety of scholars.

== Published works ==
- 1962 – The Bacaudae: A Study of Rebellion in Late Roman Gaul (University of Chicago, Department of History)
- 1974 – The Impact of Alexander the Great (Dryden Press, ISBN 0-03-090000-X)
- 1972 – "Fire from heaven: Alexander at Persepolis" Classical Philology 67, 233–245.
- 1982 – "The natural resources of early Macedonia" in W. L. Adams and E. N. Borza, eds. Philip II, Alexander the Great, and the Macedonian Heritage. Lanham, MD. 1–20.
- 1983 – "The symposium at Alexander's court" Archaia Makedonia 3, 45–55
- 1990 – In the Shadow of Olympus: The Emergence of Macedon (Princeton University Press, ISBN 0-691-00880-9)
- 1995 – Makedonika (Regina Books, ISBN 0-941690-65-2)
- 1999 – "Macedonia Redux" in Frances B. Titchener and Richard F. Moorton, eds. The Eye Expanded: Life and Arts in Greco-Roman Antiquity De Gruyter, 249–65.
