= Conquistadors (TV series) =

- Genre: Documentary
- Written by: Michael Wood
- Directed by: David Wallace
- Presented by: Michael Wood
- Composer: Howard Davidson
- Country of origin: United Kingdom
- Original language: English
- No. of series: 1
- No. of episodes: 4

Production
- Executive producer: Laurence Rees
- Producer: Rebecca Dodds
- Cinematography: Peter Harvey
- Running time: 46–51 mins
- Production companies: Maya Vision for BBC and PBS

Original release
- Network: BBC
- Release: 24 November – 15 December 2000

Conquistadors (2000) is a documentary retelling of the story of the Spanish expeditions of conquest of the Americas. In this 4-part series historian Michael Wood travels in the footsteps of the Spanish expeditions, from Amazonia to Lake Titicaca, and from the deserts of North Mexico to the heights of Machu Picchu.

== Episode list ==
1. "The Fall of the Aztecs"
2. "The Conquest of the Incas"
3. "The Search for El Dorado"
4. "All the World is Human"
