= In Search of the Dark Ages =

1979 British TV documentary series

- First episode titlecard
- Created by: BBC
- Presented by: Michael Wood
- Country of origin: United Kingdom
- Original language: English
- No. of series: 2
- No. of episodes: 8

Production
- Executive producer: Roger Laughton
- Running time: 35–45 minutes

Original release
- Network: BBC
- Release: 2 January 1979 – 9 April 1981

Related
- In Search of the Trojan War

In Search of the Dark Ages is a BBC television documentary series, written and presented by historian Michael Wood, first shown between 1979 and 1981. It comprises eight short films across two series, each focusing on a particular character from the history of England prior to the Norman Conquest, a period popularly known as the Dark Ages. It is also the title of a book written by Wood to support the series, that was first published in 1981.

== Overview ==
The series was made by BBC Manchester and narrated by Wood, who was at that time a lecturer (and, eventually, Professor of History) at Manchester University. It consists of eight separate programmes, and the collective title is often written as In Search of... The Dark Ages (originally it was known simply as In Search of...). Each programme, except the finale, ran between 35 and 45 minutes. It began with a one-off pilot programme called In Search of Offa, filmed in 1978, and first broadcast in January 1979. When its reception was regarded as favourable, three further programmes were filmed in 1979. The series first aired on BBC Two in March 1980, beginning with Boadicea and including a repeat showing of the original Offa programme. The series was so well received that a second series was soon commissioned.

The programmes were filmed entirely on location with no studio-based scenes. Wood's concept was that the entire production should occur in the actual places associated with the historical events on which he was reporting. The films were mostly composed of visits to battlefields, cathedrals and other early medieval sites in England to view the actual places where the great events of history occurred. This "popular and serious style of history programming" was becoming increasingly prevalent at that time. The effect was enhanced by Wood often appearing on-screen, instead of being merely a voice-over, thereby giving the viewer an impression of journalistic immediacy.

=== Season 1 ===
No.	Title	Original release date
1	"In Search of Offa"	2 January 1979
Wood begins the show by marvelling at Offa's Dyke. At Corpus Christi College, Cambridge, he seeks clues about Offa of Mercia, a man who was King of Mercia for nearly 40 years, in the Anglo-Saxon Chronicle. He follows Offa throughout his kingdom seeking evidence of his reign - from Repton to Sutton Walls, Hereford, London, Irthlingborough, Gumley, Brixworth, and Worcester Cathedral. In winter Offa would return to his capital at Tamworth, but contemporary evidence of his great hall is scant. Back at the dyke, new research suggests the defensive method of the structure, while at Bedford Offa's supposed tomb is now lost to the waters of River Great Ouse.
2	"In Search of Boadicea"	11 March 1980
Starting at a Victorian statue of Boadicea and Her Daughters, Wood seeks evidence of Boudica, Queen of the Iceni. He describes the bloody and destructive revolt she led. Starting with the Iceni presence around present day Norfolk, he finds little evidence of their settlements but much more of their metalworking. At Jesus College, Oxford, he examines a manuscript by Tacitus revealing some of the background to the revolt. At Colchester he looks at colonial life and the increased threat of revolt. He traces the revolt from vaults of the Temple of Claudius, to Londinium, Watling Street, Manduessedum (the likely battle site), Lunt Roman Fort and Venta Icenorum.
3	"In Search of Arthur"	12 March 1980
Wood begins his search for King Arthur at Glastonbury Abbey, where the fabricated mythology of medieval times flourished. Citing William of Malmesbury's uncertainty, he travels to Portchester seeking traces of the Anglo-Saxon influx and the ebbing of Romano-British identity. At Wroxeter Roman City, Cirencester and Withington he finds evidence of the decline of organised urban life, and the expansion of rural life. The reoccupation of hillforts, such as Cadbury Castle, led to the successful indigenous defence at the Battle of Badon. At the British Library he consults the Harleian genealogies, but finds little that is reliable. Finally at Bremenium and Carlisle he finds hints that Arthur may have lived and died further north than legend states.
4	"In Search of Alfred the Great"	14 March 1980
Wood begins in the Churchill War Rooms with the story of England's desperate struggle against the Vikings. Travelling along The Ridgeway he describes the Battle of Ashdown which helped Alfred gain the kingship. Later, at Hamwic, Wessex's major port, the Danes devastated trade and the local economy, before moving on to Wareham, Exeter, and Gloucester. After the ambush at Chippenham, his kingdom reached its nadir in the nearby marshes of Athelney (near where the Alfred Jewel was later discovered). He risked all at the Battle of Edington, and established stability via the Treaty of Alfred and Guthrum. At Wareham, Winchester, London, and Lyng, Wood then discusses how Alfred re-engineered an "upsurge in urban life". At the Bodleian Library he reviews Alfred's second great revolution, that of literacy.

=== Season 2 ===
No.	Title	Original release date
1	"In Search of Athelstan"	19 March 1981
Wood begins in the Abbey of Malmesbury, Wiltshire, where the tomb of Æthelstan - arguably the first "King of the English", stands. The grandson of Alfred the Great, he reigned over the realms of Wessex, Mercia, and the Danelaw, and later Northumbria. In 927, he swept north, capturing Danish Jórvík, receiving the vassalage of the fortress of Bamburgh, and the submission of British lords at Eamont Bridge, Hereford, and Exeter, becoming the first southern king to achieve lordship over northern Britain. Styling himself as "Emperor", he shifted focus to church patronage such as St Nectan's and St Cuthbert's, reaffirming the River Wye as the Welsh border, alongside city and shire administrative reform. In 939, he overcame his greatest threat at the Battle of Brunanburh, which Wood places at Brinsworth.
2	"In Search of Eric Bloodaxe"	26 March 1981
Wood seeks evidence of a lost Chronicle of Eric Haraldsson, the last Norse king of Northumbria. Starting in Howden Minster, he retraces events in multicultural Jórvík and the Church of St Mary, noting the role of Arch-bishop Wulfstan. Wood assembles the scattered citations and references to the lost work, then follows the trail to the crypt of Ripon Cathedral, the "rescue" of the relics of St Wilfrid by Eadred in 948, and the ambush at Castleford. With the threat of reprisals, Bloodaxe is forced into exile and obscurity, until his sudden return and reinstatement in 952. At the Gosforth Cross, he ponders the mingling of Christian and Norse mythologies, and Bloodaxe's baptism at St Cuthbert's. He ends at the Battle of Stainmore and the failing of Northumbrian independence.
3	"In Search of Ethelred the Unready"	2 April 1981
Wood starts in a Bradford on Avon church, where he states that Æthelred has arguably the poorest reputation of any English king. At the Bodleian Library Wood accesses the Anglo-Saxon Chronicle, where a story of disaster, defeat and governmental collapse unfolds. Wood recalls the failure in 991 at Maldon, which led to vast payments of Danegeld, and visits the British Museum to examine coins of the period. He then recounts the St. Brice's Day massacre of 1002 and Sweyn Forkbeard's retaliatory raids, and the failure of the Anglo-Saxon fleet at Sandwich Bay, Kent in 1009. He then details the loss of Canterbury, and the 12 million silver coin ransom paid in 1012. Wood finally ponders the legacy of Æthelred the "un-red" or un-counselled through the exploits of his son and the rise of Sweyn's son Cnut.
4	"In Search of William the Conqueror"	9 April 1981
Wood reflects on the effect of cross-channel invasions and their impact on history. He suggests that the Norman Conquest is the arguably most famous event in British history and also the most controversial. Beginning his search in Normandy, he traces the early life of William, as a bastard then a Duke, and of the Normans as vikings and then knights. Wood interviews curator Michel de Boüard who describes William as the daring single-minded political genius of his time. After securing his duchy, through familial ties, he was drawn into England's succession crisis. Woods examines the Bayeux Tapestry then travels to the battlefields at Stamford Bridge and Hastings. As the Normans forged their hold on England by building motte-and-bailey castles everywhere, the Anglo-Saxon era came to an end. In the Public Record Office in London, Wood consults the Domesday Book with a lament at the passing of the chief makers of England.

== Reception ==
The series made the reputation of Wood, and launched his broadcasting career. Its success has been attributed in part to his "down-to-earth and friendly style" (at the time of its first broadcast, Wood was not yet a practising academic), and in part to the romantic and legendary, sometimes semi-mythical, subject matter. Wood attempted to penetrate beyond popular myths surrounding a chosen figure, to uncover their real historical character. As The Times television reviewer remarked, Wood is "never at a loss for a striking analogy". At a time when documentaries were often the exclusive preserve of academics, Wood's youth, fashion, and enthusiasm were regarded as being the key to the success of the series.

Repeats of the two series continued to air until 1984, however, it was not possible to include the first programme, about Offa, in the re-runs which aired in 1984, as that programme had already had two repeats by then (which was, at the time, the most that was permitted under the BBC's contractual arrangements with the broadcasting unions). While remaining an Anglo-Saxon specialist, Woods subsequently branched out into other aspects of history, including In Search of the Trojan War (1985), In Search of Shakespeare (2003), and In Search of Myths and Heroes (2005), returning to an Anglo-Saxon theme with In Search of Beowulf (2009) and King Alfred and the Anglo Saxons (2013).

== Home media ==
A double DVD set was released in 2015:

- Running time 352 minutes
- Certification E
- Languages English
- Region 2
- Subtitles No
- Format DVD
- Release Date 02/02/2015
- Distributor Simply Home Entertainment
- Number of Discs 2
- Label Simply Media
- RRP 24.99
- Country of Origin United Kingdom
- Main Category Special Interest
- Sub Category Documentary/Historical

== Book ==
Wood's accompanying book based on the series, entitled In Search of The Dark Ages (BBC Books, 1981), was published to coincide with the BBC's showing of the second series, with the book release occurring on 19 March 1981, the same day on which the first programme was transmitted. New editions were published in 1987, 1994, 2001, 2005 and 2015.

As well as the eight subjects of the television series, the book includes a ninth chapter on the Sutton Hoo man which was not made into a TV episode. An edition published for the Folio Society in 2022 includes five further chapters on Penda of Mercia, Harian of Canterbury, Æthelflæd, Lady of the Mercians, Lady Wynflæd and Eadgyth, Queen of Germany. The book was described by the TLS as "a splendid back-up book for 'A'Level historians".

Contemporary reviews of the book included comments such as: "Wood's carefully researched foray into early medieval Britain sifts a number of unresolved mysteries" (Publishers Weekly). The book's popularity was such that it eventually ran to four editions, published between 1981 and 1987. It has endeavoured to avoid the fate of the television series, with Wood subsequently revising the book to include recent discoveries; and it remains currently available in the Revised Edition (published in 2001).
