= Şeref =

Şeref is a Turkish name and may refer to:

== Given name ==
- Şeref Eroğlu (born 1975), Turkish wrestler
- Şeref Has (born 1936), Turkish footballer
- Şeref Taşlıova (1938–2014), Turkish storyteller
- Şeref Görkey (1913–2004), Turkish footballer
- Şeref Osmanoğlu (born 1989)
- Şeref Tüfenk (born 1983), Turkish Olympic wrestler

== Other uses ==
- Şeref Stadium, was a football stadium in Beşiktaş, İstanbul
