= Foot fault =

Foot fault, foot-fault or footfault may refer to:

== Sports ==
- Foot fault, when a competitor's foot placement does not comply with the official rules in sports such as:
  - Bowls
  - Pickleball
  - Tennis
  - Volleyball

== Television ==
- Foot Fault, a Season 4 episode of The Secret World of Alex Mack
- Foot Fault, an episode of The House
- Chapter 5: Foot Fault, a Season 1 episode of Gēmusetto
