= The Good Father =

- Theatrical release poster
- Directed by: Mike Newell
- Written by: Christopher Hampton
- Based on: The Good Father by Peter Prince
- Produced by: Ann Scott
- Starring: Anthony Hopkins; Jim Broadbent; Harriet Walter; Joanne Whalley; Simon Callow
- Cinematography: Michael Coulter
- Edited by: Peter Hollywood
- Music by: Richard Hartley
- Production companies: FilmFour International; Greenpoint Films
- Distributed by: Mainline Pictures
- Release date: November 1985
- Running time: 90 minutes
- Country: United Kingdom
- Language: English
- Budget: £764,000

The Good Father is a 1985 British film directed by Mike Newell and starring Anthony Hopkins, Jim Broadbent, Harriet Walter, Fanny Viner, Simon Callow, Joanne Whalley, and Michael Byrne. It is loosely based on Peter Prince's 1983 novel of the same name. It marked the first credited appearance in a feature film of Stephen Fry. The film was produced for British television but received a theatrical release in the US.

== Plot ==
Bill is a man who is bitter about his recent divorce from his wife and the loss of custody of his only child. He acts out his anger by befriending Roger, a man who is being sued for divorce by his wife so that she can enter into a lesbian relationship with her lover. Bill tries to help the man out, by funding the latter's court case to regain custody of his child. Soon Bill, who has focused his anger against feminism, which he blames for robbing him of his family, begins to feel doubt for what he and his new friend are doing.

== Cast ==
- Anthony Hopkins as Bill Hooper
- Jim Broadbent as Roger Miles
- Harriet Walter as Emmy Hooper
- Frances Viner as Cheryl Langford
- Simon Callow as Mark Varda
- Miriam Margolyes as Jane Powell
- Joanne Whalley as Mary Hall
- Michael Byrne as Leonard Scruby
- Jennie Stoller as Bill's Friend
- Johanna Kirby as Bill's Friend
- Stephen Fry as Creighton
- Clifford Rose as Judge
- Harry Grubb as Christopher Hooper
- Tom Jamieson as Roger's Son

== Critical reception ==
In The New York Times, Vincent Canby wrote, The Good Father "is full of ironic surprises. It's the kind of 'small' film that, by recording so accurately the minute details of particular lives, also manages - without effort - to evoke the larger, mostly unseen context in which these lives are led: the England of Margaret Thatcher and a society that now only dimly remembers the excitement and urgency of the political commitment of the 1960's." He added the film is "wonderfully well acted by Mr. Hopkins, who moves through the film as if wired with enough explosives to wipe out half of London. At any minute, he might blow. It's a brilliant, exacting characterization, the only reservation being that it's initially so persuasive that the resolution may come as a bit of a stretch".
