= Michael Wood's Story of England =

- Genre: Documentary
- Written by: Michael Wood
- Directed by: Wayne Derrick
- Presented by: Michael Wood
- Country of origin: United Kingdom
- Original language: English
- No. of series: 1
- No. of episodes: 6

Production
- Executive producer: Cassian Harrison
- Producer: Rebecca Dodds
- Cinematography: Peter Harvey
- Running time: 55–60 minutes
- Production company: Maya Vision for BBC

Original release
- Network: BBC
- Release: 22 September – 27 October 2010

Michael Wood's Story of England is a six-part BBC documentary series written and presented by Michael Wood and airing from 22 September 2010. It tells the story of one place, the Leicestershire village of Kibworth, throughout the whole of English history from the Roman era to the modern era. The series focuses on tracing history through ordinary people in an ordinary English town, with current residents of Kibworth sharing what they know of their ancestors and participating in tracing their history. A four-part version aired on PBS in the United States in 2012.

== Episode one: Romans to Normans ==
With the help of the local people and using archaeology, landscape, language and DNA, Michael uncovers the lost history of the first thousand years of the village, featuring a Roman villa, Anglo-Saxons and Vikings and graphic evidence of life on the eve of the Norman Conquest.

== Episode two: Domesday to Magna Carta ==
Wood's unique portrait moves on to 1066 when the Normans build a castle in Kibworth. He reveals how occupation affected the villagers from the gallows to the alehouse, and shows the medieval open fields in action in the only place where they still survive today.

With the help of the residents, he charts events in the village leading to the people's involvement in the Civil War of Simon de Montfort, 6th Earl of Leicester, intertwining local and national narratives.

== Episode three: The Great Famine and the Black Death ==
Wood's story reaches the catastrophic 14th century. Kibworth goes through the worst famine in European history, and then, as revealed in the village archive in Merton College Oxford, two thirds of the people die in the Black Death.

Helped by today's villagers – field walking and reading the historical texts – and by the local schoolchildren digging archaeological test pits, Wood follows stories of individual lives through these times, out of which the English idea of community and the English character begin to emerge.

== Episode four: Peasants' Revolt to Tudors ==
Wood's tale moves on to battles of conscience in the time of the Hundred Years' War. Finds in the school archive help trace peasant education back to the 14th century, and show how the people themselves set up the first school for their children.

Some villagers join in a rebellion against King Henry V, while others rise to become middle-class merchants in the textile town of Coventry. On the horizon is the Protestant Reformation, but the rise of capitalism and individualism sow the seeds of England's future greatness.

== Episode five: Henry VIII to the Industrial Revolution ==
The tale reaches the dramatic events of Henry VIII's Reformation and the battles of the English Civil War. The programme tracks Kibworth's 17th-century Dissenters, travels on the Grand Union Canal, and looks at Anna Laetitia Barbauld, an 18th-century feminist writer from Kibworth who was a pioneer of children's books.

The story of a young highwayman exiled to Australia comes alive as his living descendants come back to the village to uncover their roots. Lastly, the Industrial Revolution comes to the village with framework knitting factories, changing the village and its people forever.

== Episode six: Victoria to the Present Day ==
In this final episode, helped by today's villagers Michael uncovers the secret history of a Victorian village more colourful than even Dickens could have imagined. Recreating their penny concerts of the 1880s, visiting World War I battlefields with the school and recalling the Home Guard, local land girls and the bombing of the village in 1940, the series finally moves into the new world of 'homes fit for heroes' and the villagers come together to leave a reminder of their world for future generations.

== Other media ==
A book (ISBN 0670919047) and DVD (ASIN B00860YHSM) followed the series.

== See also ==
- The Village (2013 TV series)
- Ulverton, a 1992 novel by Adam Thorpe
