= RAF Linton-on-Ouse =

Royal Air Force base in Yorkshire, England

RAF Linton-on-Ouse
- Linton-on-Ouse, North Yorkshire in England
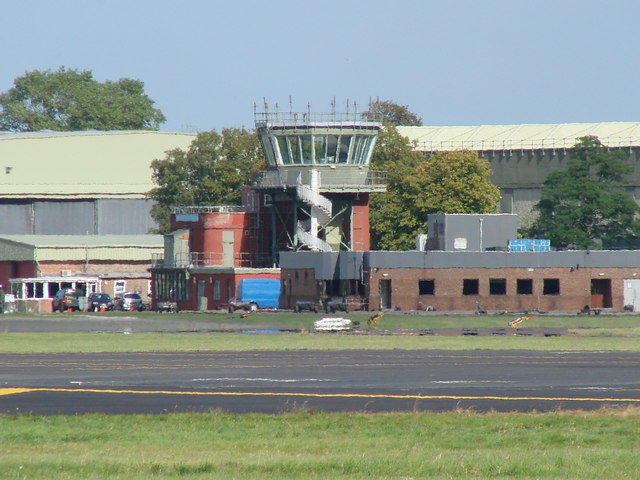
- The old air traffic control tower at RAF Linton-on-Ouse

- A Flumine Impugnamus (Latin for 'From the [mighty] river we strike')

Site information
- Type: Royal Air Force station
- Code: LO
- Owner: Ministry of Defence
- Operator: Royal Air Force; 1937–42 & 1945–2020; Royal Canadian Air Force; 1942–45
- Controlled by: No. 6 Group RCAF; RAF Bomber Command * No. 4 Group RAF; RAF Fighter Command 1945–57; RAF Flying Training Command 1957–68; RAF Training Command 1968–77 * No. 23 Group RAF
- Condition: Closed

Location
- Shown within North Yorkshire RAF Linton-on-Ouse (the United Kingdom)
- Coordinates: 54°02′56″N 001°15′10″W
- Grid reference: SE490617
- Area: 276 hectares (680 acres)

Site history
- Built: 1936–1937
- In use: 13 May 1937–2020
- Battles/wars: European theatre of World War II; Cold War

Airfield information
- Identifiers: IATA: HRT, ICAO: EGXU, WMO: 03266
- Elevation: 16.2 metres (53 ft) AMSL
Runways
Direction	Length and surface
03/21	1,834 metres (6,017 ft) asphalt
10/28	1,338 metres (4,390 ft) asphalt
- Source: RAF Linton-on-Ouse Defence Aerodrome Manual

Royal Air Force Linton-on-Ouse or more simply RAF Linton-on-Ouse (IATA: HRT, ICAO: EGXU) is a former Royal Air Force station at Linton-on-Ouse in North Yorkshire, England, 10 miles (16 km) north-west of York. It had satellite stations at RAF Topcliffe and Dishforth Airfield (British Army).

The station opened in 1937. With the transfer of pilot training to RAF Valley on Anglesey in 2019, the station closed in 2020. In February 2021, the MOD confirmed that no alternative military use had been identified for the site and that it would therefore be sold.

== History ==
RAF Linton-on-Ouse opened on 13 May 1937 as a bomber airfield and was the home of No. 4 Group RAF until 1940. The base's first commander was Wing Commander A. D. Pryor.

When the Second World War began, bombers were launched from Linton to drop propaganda leaflets over Germany and the base was eventually used to launch bombing raids on Norway, The Netherlands, Germany, and Italy. Linton was one of 11 stations allocated to No. 6 Group, Royal Canadian Air Force during the war.

In May 1941 the station was bombed by the Luftwaffe resulting in the death of 13 airmen including the station commander, Group Captain Garroway. A York Press article refers to the 'mystery' of how Garroway was killed – the station's record books state he was directing firefighting when he met his death, not taking shelter. His son, who was also in the RAF, was later killed in action.

At the end of the war the station was involved with transporting passengers and freight back to the UK. After which it became a Fighter Command station operating the Gloster Meteor, Canadair Sabre and Hawker Hunter until it was closed and put under care and maintenance in 1957.

On 9 September 1957, the base was reopened as the home of No. 1 Flying Training School (FTS) and was responsible for training pilots for both the RAF and the Royal Navy's Fleet Air Arm.

In October 1975 Headquarters No. 23 Group RAF disbanded at the station.

Between March 1979 and March 1980 the BBC filmed episodes 4, 5 and 6 of the Fighter Pilot series at the base. The series aired in 1981.

In 1985, engineering and supply services were contracted out to private firms. The contract for this was held by Babcock International.

Between 1992 and 1994 the Chief Flying Instructor was Wing Commander Paul McDonald (later Group Captain), author of several books including his memoirs, 'Winged Warriors – The Cold War from the Cockpit' in which he describes his tour at RAF Linton-on-Ouse. Following his retirement from regular service, Paul McDonald returned to the station as a Tucano simulator instructor.

No. 1 Flying Training School was the last RAF Unit to operate the BAC Jet Provost T3A and T5A which were replaced in 1993 by the Short Tucano T1.

In 1999 the entire NCO married quarter site at Linton Woods were purchased by The Welbeck Estate Group and underwent a major upgrade.

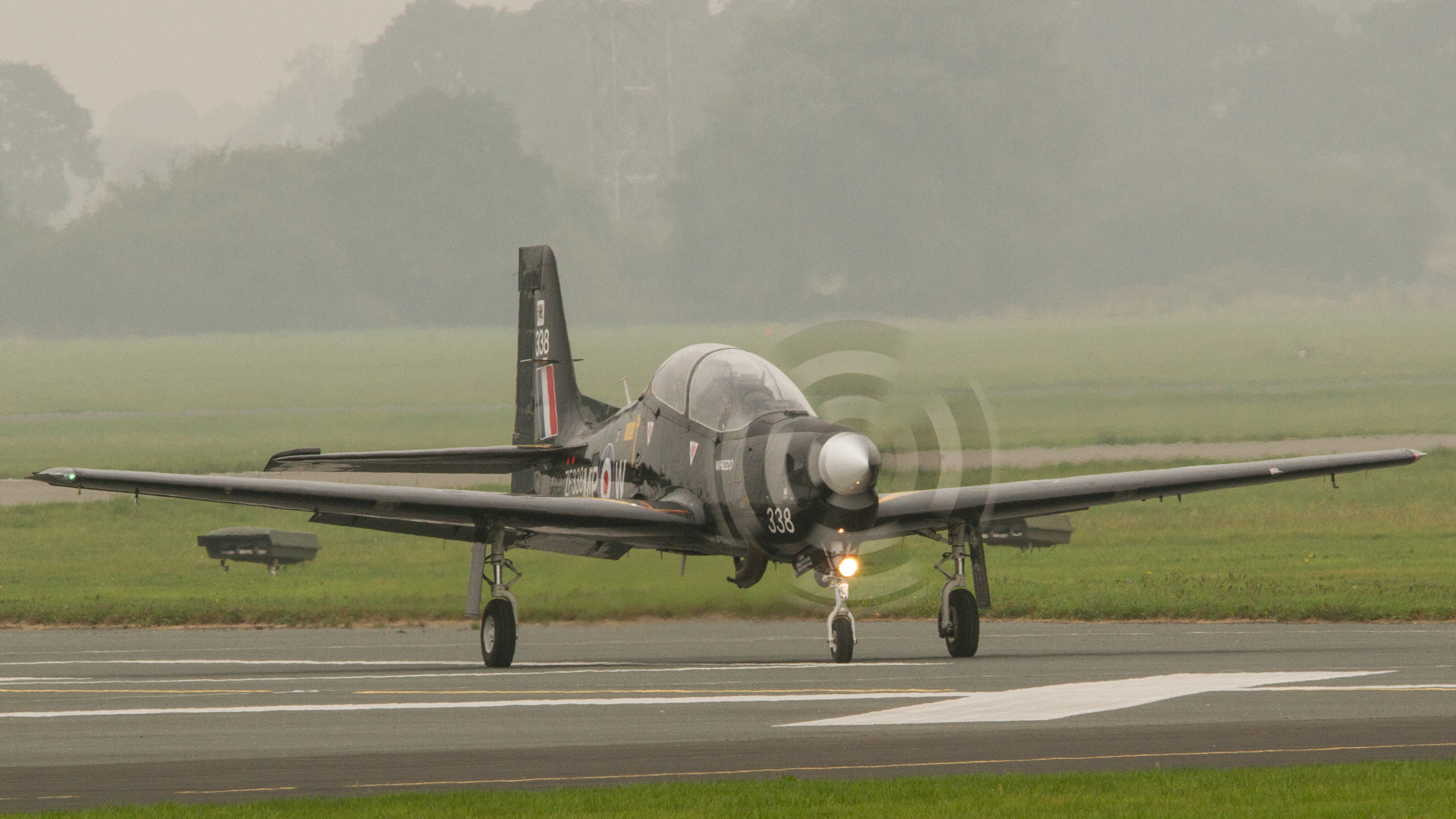
A Short Tucano T1 at RAF Linton-on-Ouse.

No. 72(R) Squadron provided Basic Fast Jet Training (BFJT) at Linton-on-Ouse on the Short Tucano T1 before the Squadron's move to RAF Valley in November 2019.

The Yorkshire Universities Air Squadron relocated to RAF Linton-on-Ouse from RAF Church Fenton in 2014. YUAS operated the Grob Tutor T1 aircraft.

The station also housed a memorial room (limited public opening) which recounts the history of the base and the units which have been associated with it.

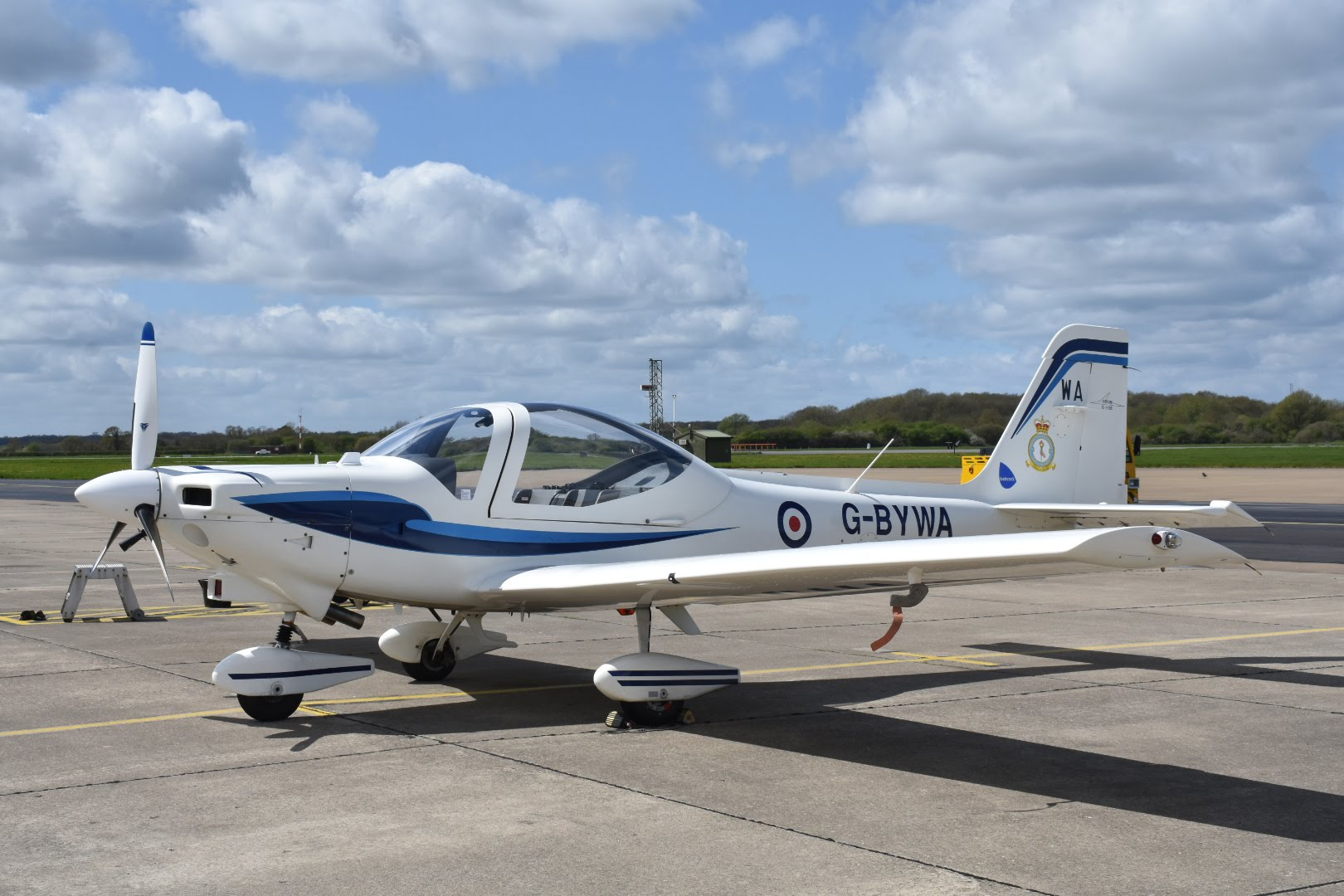
A Grob Tutor T1 at RAF Linton-on-Ouse

=== Drawdown and closure ===
In October 2014, it was confirmed by the Ministry of Defence (MOD) that basic fast-jet training would move from Linton-on-Ouse to RAF Valley in Anglesey in 2019. The move was part of the UK Military Flying Training System (UKMFTS) which saw the Beechcraft Texan T1 replace the Tucano T1 in the basic fast-jet training role. At that time, the MOD did not confirm what future role Linton-on-Ouse would have, but in July 2018, it was stated that the RAF would vacate the base by 2020 and it would be disposed of completely. However, in March 2019, the MOD indicated it was considering options for other defence uses for the site, before a final decision was made.

Flying training ceased in October 2019, when the final student pilots graduated and training fully relocated to Valley. The final flying unit to depart was the Yorkshire Universities Air Squadron, which relocated to RAF Leeming on 1 December 2020. The MOD notified the Civil Aviation Authority that the aerodrome would close on 18 December 2020. In February 2021, the MOD confirmed that no alternative military use had been identified for the site and that it would therefore be made available for sale by the end of 2023.

In August 2021, the station was used to support COVID-19 countermeasures for personnel returning from Afghanistan on Operation Pitting.

=== Proposed processing centre for asylum seekers ===
In April 2022, the government announced its intention to convert the camp into a reception, accommodation and processing centre for asylum seekers, as a way of defraying the £4.7 million per day cost of hotels being used. The plan was met by resistance from local residents who claim that asylum seekers will outnumber existing residents. The press has used the moniker "Guantánamo-on-Ouse" to describe the proposal, in reference to the Guantanamo Bay detention camp. However, on 9 August 2022, the government backtracked on this policy, with Defence Secretary Ben Wallace stating this plan would now not go ahead.

In July 2026, the Government published refreshed proposals. Local politicians expressed concern about the lack of infrastructure, transport links and local services in the area, and that this could potentially impact on community cohesion and future development plans for the area.

== Motorsport ==
Linton-on-Ouse
- Location: Yorkshire, England
- Opened: 1960
- Closed: 1961
- Website: http://www.raf.mod.uk/raflintononouse/
- Length: 1.7 mi (2.7 km)

In the summers of 1960 and 1961, the perimeter track and parts of two runways were used to form the 1.7 mile, Linton-on-Ouse circuit, on what was still an operational RAF base, with the racing organised by the Northern branch of the British Racing and Sports Car Club. The 1960 meeting was held in torrential rain and Tony Hodgetts recalls blue sparks coming off his fingers as he cranked the field telephone which was used by the marshals to communicate with race control. The meeting was dominated by Jimmy Blumer in his Cooper Monaco T49. The final meeting in 1961 was marred by a fatal accident to a flag marshal. The driver of the Formula Junior car involved was a serving RAF officer and, following the inquest into the death of the marshal, the venue was no longer available. After this sad incident and a near fatality to another flag marshal at Full Sutton Circuit, Tony Hodgetts and Garth Nicholls started a campaign which resulted in flag marshals working face to face instead of back to back, a system which is still in use and is considerably safer.

== List of station commanders ==
- 13 May 1937, Flight Lieutenant C L Dook
- 29 Jul 1937, Flight Lieutenant G F M Warner
- 20 Apr 1938, Wing Commander A D Pryor
- Jun 1940, Group Captain R Ivelaw-Chapman
- 1941, Group Captain F M F Garraway (killed in bombing raid 10 May 1941)
- 1941, Group Captain J R Whitley (shot down and evaded)
- 1943, Group Captain D E L Wilson RAAF
- 15 Jun 1943, Group Captain D M Edwards RCAF
- 1943, Group Captain W A Jones RCAF
- 1944, Group Captain A L Annis RCAF
- 1945, Group Captain W P Pleasance
- 1946, Group Captain H J Maguire
- 1947, Wing Commander H B Johnson
- 1948, Group Captain F L White
- 1948, Group Captain A C P Carver
- 1949, Group Captain F S Stapleton
- 1950, Group Captain A F Anderson
- 1952, Group Captain M G F Pedley
- July 1954, Group Captain D. F. Spotswood
- 1956, Group Captain W Pitt-Brown
- 1957, Group Captain W C J Brain
- 1957, Group Captain L W G Gill
- 23 May 1960, Group Captain J L W Ellacombe
- 1962, Group Captain R L Fuller
- 28 Feb 1965, Group Captain R H Compton
- 1967, Group Captain J H Lewis
- 1 May 1970, Group Captain R G Price
- 28 Apr 1972, Group Captain J L W Towler
- 1974, Group Captain R J Bannard
- 1976, Group Captain R B Gubbins
- 1977, Group Captain B J Westoby
- 1979, Group Captain R H Wood
- 8 May 1981, Group Captain Don I. Oakden
- 1983, Group Captain P J Kemp
- 1985, Group Captain G H Rolfe
- 1988, Group Captain J A Prideaux
- 1990, Group Captain P J Gooding
- 1992, Group Captain T Eeles, Author 'A Passion for Flying'
- 1994, Group Captain D H Milne Smith
- 1996, Group Captain R M Thomas
- Jul 1998, Group Captain G H Edge
- 15 July 2000, Group Captain Ken L. Cornfield, born November 1955, attended King Edward's Birmingham, studied Geography at St John's College, Cambridge from 1974–77
- 6 Dec 2002, Group Captain D I Harrison
- 2005, Group Captain A Sudlow
- 1 Dec 2006, Group Captain M W G Hopkins
- 2009, Group Captain M Longstaff
- Aug 2010, Group Captain T W Jones
- 22 June 2012, Group Captain David G. Cooper, former Tornado pilot
- October 2014, Group Captain Ian Laing
- November 2016, Group Captain Keith Taylor
- November 2019, Wing Commander Howard Newbould

== Units ==
The following squadrons were here at some point:

- No. 4 Squadron RAF
- No. 35 (Madras Presidency) Squadron RAF
- No. 51 Squadron RAF
- No. 58 Squadron RAF
- No. 64 Squadron RAF
- No. 65 (East India) Squadron RAF
- No. 66 Squadron RAF
- No. 76 Squadron RAF
- No. 77 Squadron RAF
- No. 78 Squadron RAF
- No. 92 (East India) Squadron RAF
- No. 102 (Ceylon) Squadron RAF
- No. 264 (Madras Presidency) Squadron RAF
- No. 275 Squadron RAF
- No. 405 Squadron RCAF
- No. 408 Squadron RCAF
- No. 426 Squadron RCAF
- 819 Naval Air Squadron

Units

- No. 1 Flying Training School RAF
- No. 2 Blind Approach Training Flight RAF
- No. 3 Flying Training School RAF
- No. 4 (Bomber) Group RAF
- No. 4 Group Communication Flight RAF
- No. 6 (Bomber) (RCAF) Group RAF
- No. 6 Group Communication Flight RCAF
- No. 7 Anti-Aircraft Co-operation Unit RAF
- No. 12 Blind Approach Training Flight RAF became No. 1512 (Beam Approach Training) Flight RAF
- No. 23 Group RAF
- No. 23 Group Communication Flight RAF
- No. 28 Gliding School RAF
- No. 35 Conversion Flight RAF
- No. 62 (RCAF) (Beaver) Base RAF
- No. 64 Group Communication Flight RAF
- No. 158 Conversion Flight RAF
- No. 642 Gliding School RAF became No. 642 Volunteer Gliding Squadron RAF
- No. 1665 (Heavy Transport) Conversion Unit RAF
- No. 2720 Squadron RAF Regiment
- No. 2799 Squadron RAF Regiment
- Central Flying School Tucano Squadron
- European Defence Agency (EDA)
- Hornet Conversion Flight RAF
- Northern Sector HQ RAF
- Tucano Air Navigation Squadron RAF
- Yorkshire Sector RAF
- Yorkshire Universities Air Squadron

== November 2008 incident ==
In early November 2008 Wing Commander Paul Gerrard, who was based at the station, was involved in an unusual mid-air rescue. Sixty-five-year-old Jim O'Neill was flying a four-seater Cessna 182 from Scotland to Essex after a family holiday, when he had a stroke which caused temporary blindness. Gerrard was on a training flight, and after being alerted to the situation, located O'Neill's aircraft and over a 45-minute period, guided O'Neill to a safe landing at Linton.

== See also ==
- List of Royal Air Force stations
