= See No Evil (2025 TV series) =

British true-crime docuseries

- Genre: Docu-series
- Directed by: Benedict Sanderson
- Starring: John Smyth
- Composer: Matt Davidson
- Country of origin: United Kingdom
- Original language: English
- No. of seasons: 1
- No. of episodes: 2

Production
- Producers: Kira Phillips, Hamish Ferguson, Amelia Griffiths, Cathy Newman
- Editor: Otto Burnham Ace
- Running time: 59 minutes (Part 1); 59 minutes (Part 2)
- Production company: Passion Pictures

Original release
- Network: Channel 4
- Release: 10 December 2025

See No Evil is a 2025 two-part television documentary series aired on Channel 4 on 10 December 2025. The documentary covers the life and work of John Smyth, and the child abuse he took part in as a member of the Church of England. The documentary includes interviews with victims of Smyth, as well as his immediate family.

== Synopsis ==
In the documentary, victims allege that John Smyth groomed them while they were at Winchester College during the 1970s and 1980s. The documentary opens with two of the victims, Andy Morse and Mark Stibbe, describing their experiences as pupils and friends at the school. Morse talks about how he was sent away to boarding school at the age of seven and how, in common with numerous other Wykehamists, he suffered from homesickness. Talks were given at the school by evangenical Christian leaders. John Smyth was a guest speaker at a meeting of the Christian Forum, and he started to meet boys in smaller groups to discuss religion and their personal lives. In 1974, boys who attended the Christian Forum were encouraged to attend the Iwerene Minster boys holiday camps (known as "Bash camps") during Easter and the summer holidays. Smyth was a leader at the camp and promoted a version of "muscular Christianity" that was popular within conservative evangelicanism.

Smyth would invite select boys from Winchester College, particularly from Kingsgate House boarding house (known as "Beloes") to his home for Sunday lunch, to spend time with his family and to swim in his pool during the summer months. Smyth's children would play with the boys and his wife Anne would cook for them. Smyth would choose vulnerable boys from among those he invited, take them to the garden shed, read the Bible and subsequently beat them with a cane. The beatings could last for hours and caused some of the boys to bleed from their wounds. Moore attempted suicide as a result of the abuse, and this prompted concern to be raised by a Cambridge vicar, Mark Ruston, who investigated and spoke with some of the boys, subsequently producing what is known as the Ruston Report. A meeting with key people from the Iwerne Trust was held after the report was written, and they decided that Smyth should be relocated.

John Smyth's wife and children were interviewed in the documentary and they described life with Smyth as being one of dread and fear. The family lived in a large house with an orchard garden and a swimming pool. The Smyth family move to Zimbabwe where Smyth established Zambesi Holidays, using a similar model as the Iwerene camps, and his son Peter works with Smyth at the camps. In 1993, lawyer David Coltart is approached by a mother who said she was concerned that her son had come back from one of the camps covered in bruises. Smyth beat boys at the camp.

In 2014, writer and theologian Andrew Graystone was approached by the Christian organisation Titus Trust. Graystone says he was given a dossier of documents that detailed a 1982 report detailing numerous different accusations of abuse against young boys by John Smyth. Graystone was asked by the Trust to help them deal with this and prevent this getting out and causing reputational damage to the organisation. Graystone says he told the Trust that this needs investigated but this did not happen and he did not end up working with the Trust. However, Graystone retained the dossier and he approached journalist Cathy Newman with the information.

In 2016, Newman and colleagues investigated John Smyth and they tried to find the victims. Investigative journalist Tom Stone began with finding the accuser (known as "Graham"), who had come to the Titus Trust in 2014 and resulted in them approaching Graystone. Stone uses a book Winchester College: A Register, which includes the names of every student who has ever attended the college. Stone meets and interviews contemporaries of "Graham" and interviews Morse.

== Contributors ==
- Andy Morse as himself
- Mark Stibbe as himself
- Andrew Graystone (Writer and Theologian) as himself
- Cathy Newman (journalist) as herself
- Tom Stone (investigative journalist) as himself
- "Graham" as himself
- Peter John Jackson Smyth (John Smyth's son) as himself
- Fiona (John Smyth's daughter) as herself
- Caroline (John Smyth's daughter) as herself
- Anne Smyth (John Smyth's wife) as herself
- David Coltart (Human Rights lawyer) as himself
- Jason Leanders as himself

== Critical reception ==
The Guardian gave See No Evil 4/5 stars, and Lucy Mangan described it as "[...] immaculately made, deeply harrowing" and praises the documentary for allowing the victims to eloquently and patiently detail their experiences. Writing for The Observer, Barbara Ellen says the docuseries is "truly disquieting viewing" and that it is a powerful but painful watch. Hello Magazine also gave a positive review and included viewers responses who were left "heartbroken" by the docuseries. The Times called it a "harrowing expose" of John Smyth's abuse and the culpability of the Church of England.

=== Awards and nominations ===
Year	Award	Category	Result	Ref.
2026	British Academy Television Awards	Best Factual Series	Won	

== Response from the Church of England ==
Following the airing of See No Evil, the Church of England released an official statement on the 11 December 2025. The statement was given by bishops Joanne Grenfell and Robert Springett and safeguarding director Alexander Kubeyinje. The statement apologises for Church's failure to protect the vulnerable and said:

The Channel 4 documentary See No Evil is a harrowing reminder of the horrific abuse carried out by the late John Smyth, the failure of the Church to act, and the devastating effect on the lives of the victims and survivors and their loved ones, including Smyth's family. Support has been and continues to be offered, including in the light of this week's documentary.

— The Church of England
