= Oppenheimer (TV series) =

1980 drama television serial

- 2023 DVD cover
- Genre: Biopic drama
- Written by: Peter Prince
- Directed by: Barry Davis
- Starring: Sam Waterston; Jana Shelden; Christopher Muncke; Edward Hardwicke; David Suchet
- Narrated by: John Carson
- Composer: Carl Davis
- Countries of origin: United Kingdom; United States
- Original language: English
- No. of episodes: 7

Production
- Executive producer: Peter Goodchild
- Cinematography: Rodney Taylor
- Editor: Tariq Anwar
- Running time: 57–68 minutes
- Production companies: BBC; WGBH
- Budget: $1.5 million

Original release
- Network: BBC Two (United Kingdom); PBS (United States)
- Release: 29 October – 10 December 1980

Oppenheimer is a seven-part biographical drama based on the life and career of American theoretical physicist J. Robert Oppenheimer. Written by Peter Prince and directed by Barry Davis, the series is a co-production between the BBC and WGBH. It stars Sam Waterston in the title role, with Jana Shelden, Christopher Muncke, Edward Hardwicke, and David Suchet in supporting roles, and is narrated by John Carson.

Oppenheimer premiered in the United Kingdom on BBC Two on 29 October 1980, and concluded on 10 December 1980, consisting of seven episodes. The series won three BAFTA TV Awards, including Best Drama Series or Serial, from seven nominations. It received two Primetime Emmy Award nominations for Outstanding Limited Series and Outstanding Writing in a Limited Series or a Special for Prince. For his portrayal of Oppenheimer, Waterston was nominated for a BAFTA TV Award and a Golden Globe Award.

== Plot synopsis ==
The series depicts Oppenheimer's wartime role as head of the weapons laboratory of the Manhattan Project, during which he was under constant surveillance by the US federal government because of his association with communists. It culminates in a U.S. Atomic Energy Commission hearing in 1954, in which Oppenheimer is stripped of his security clearance; largely because of the Chevalier Incident.

== Cast ==
- Sam Waterston as J. Robert Oppenheimer
- John Carson as Narrator
- Christopher Muncke as Colonel Kenneth Nichols
- Jana Shelden as Katherine Oppenheimer
- Kate Harper as Jean Tatlock
- Edward Hardwicke as Enrico Fermi
- David Suchet as Edward Teller
- Manning Redwood as Lieutenant General Leslie Groves
- Peter Whitman as Robert Serber
- Matthew Guinness as Hans Bethe
- Bob Sherman as Ernest Lawrence
- John Morton as Robert Wilson
- Garrick Hagon as Frank Oppenheimer
- Liza Ross as Jackie Oppenheimer
- Barry Dennen as Isidor Isaac Rabi
- Ron Berglas as John Henry Manley
- Blain Fairman as Robert Bacher
- Erica Stevens as Charlotte Serber
- Peter Marinker as Haakon Chevalier
- Phil Brown as Lewis Strauss
- David Baxt as John Lansdale Jr.
- Milton Johns as George Kistiakowsky
- Anthony Forrest as Giovanni Rossi Lomanitz
- Colin Bennett as Seth Neddermeyer
- Billy J. Mitchell as William Sterling Parsons
- Christopher Malcolm as Steve Nelson
- Sarah Brackett as Priscilla Duffield
- Douglas Lambert as Kenneth Bainbridge
- Alexander Knox as Henry L. Stimson
- Ed Devereaux as Wilhelm D. Styer
- Daniel Foley as Joseph Weinberg
- James Maxwell as Lloyd Garrison
- Philip O'Brien as Roger Robb
- Seymour Green as Gordon Gray
- Shane Rimmer as Edward Condon
- Robert Arden as John J. McCloy
- Dave Hill as James Tuck
- Ed Bishop as Thomas Farrell
- Alexander Davion as Arthur Compton
- Gabor Vernon as Leo Szilard
- James Smith as Dr. Richard Harrison
- Albert Welling as Klaus Fuchs
- Bob Sessions as Thomas Finletter
- Robert Robinson as William Knowland
- Colette Hiller as Barbara Chevalier
- Ray Charleson as William L. Borden
- Marc Smith as Boris Pash

== Production ==
Oppenheimer is a co-production between the BBC and Boston's WGBH, which contributed 15 percent of the project's $1.5 million costs. The series was executive produced by the BBC's Peter Goodchild, who conceived the idea in 1975. After producing a series on physicist and chemist Marie Curie, he set his sights on Oppenheimer.

== Release ==
Oppenheimer was originally broadcast in the United Kingdom on BBC Two from 29 October to 10 December 1980, and in the United States on PBS from 11 May to 22 June 1982, as episodes of the first season of American Playhouse. More than 40 years after its release, the series became available on BBC iPlayer following the success of Christopher Nolan's 2023 film of the same name, which also chronicles the career of Oppenheimer.

== Reception ==
=== Critical response ===
John J. O'Connor of The New York Times wrote that J. Robert Oppenheimer was "persuasively" played by Sam Waterston and the series "is primarily interested in telling, quite absorbingly, one of the more puzzling and indeed astonishing stories of contemporary American history". Bill Carter of The Baltimore Sun called it "never less than a fascinating portrait of a truly fascinating man" while criticizing a "choppy production technique that makes much of the film seem rather raw".

Major General Kenneth Nichols disputed his portrayal in the series, saying that it "portrayed me serving as a personal aide to Groves on frequent visits to Los Alamos", when he did so only once.

Edward Teller wrote in 1982 of the recent BBC production that "However, General Groves in this television drama is rather inadequately represented. (Even his girth was underestimated). Obviously no one with so little intelligence as the General Groves presented by the BBC, could have met the massive responsibilities of providing shelter, equipment, and materials with so little delay and impediment to the project."

=== Accolades ===
Year	Award	Category	Recipient(s)	Result	Ref.
1981	British Academy Television Awards	Best Drama Series or Serial	Peter Goodchild; Barry Davis	Won	
1981	British Academy Television Awards	Best Actor	Sam Waterston	Nominated	
1981	British Academy Television Awards	Best Original Music	Carl Davis	Won	
1981	British Academy Television Awards	Best Film Editor	Tariq Anwar	Won	
1981	British Academy Television Awards	Best Television Cameraman	Rodney Taylor	Nominated	
1981	British Academy Television Awards	Best Television Lighting	Clive Thomas	Nominated	
1981	British Academy Television Awards	Best Film Sound	Peter Edwards	Nominated	
1982	Primetime Emmy Awards	Outstanding Limited Series	Peter Goodchild; Lindsay Law	Nominated	
1982	Primetime Emmy Awards	Outstanding Writing in a Limited Series or a Special	Peter Prince ("Part V")	Nominated	
1983	Golden Globe Awards	Best Actor in a Miniseries or Television Film	Sam Waterston	Nominated	

== See also ==
- Oppenheimer (film)
