= The Story of India =

- Genre: Documentary
- Directed by: Jeremy Jeffs
- Presented by: Michael Wood
- Composer: Howard Davidson
- Country of origin: United Kingdom
- Original language: hindi
- No. of episodes: 6

Production
- Executive producer: Martin Davidson
- Producer: Rebecca Dobbs
- Cinematography: Jeremy Jeffs
- Running time: ~60 minutes per episode

Original release
- Network: BBC Two
- Release: 24 August – 28 September 2007

The Story of India is a BBC documentary series, written and presented by historian Michael Wood about the history of India. It originally aired on BBC Two in six episodes in August and September 2007 as part of the BBC season "India and Pakistan 07", which marked the 60 year independence of India and Pakistan. An accompanying text to the series, titled Michael Wood: The Story of India, was published by BBC Books on 16 August 2007.

As in most of his documentaries, Michael Wood explains historical events by travelling to the places where they took place, examining archaeological and historical evidence at first hand and interviewing historians and archaeologists, as well as talking with local people.

== Episodes ==
=== Episode 1 – "Beginnings" ===
Through ancient manuscripts and oral tales, Wood charts the first human migrations out of Africa. He travels from the tropical backwaters of South India through lost ancient cities of the Indus Valley civilization in today's Pakistan to the vibrant landscapes of the Ganges plain. Archaeological discoveries in the Bactria–Margiana Archaeological Complex in Turkmenistan by Soviet archaeologist Viktor Sarianidi, including horse-drawn carts (mentioned in the Rig Veda), cast new light on India's past. Wood also attempts to re-create soma, an ancient drink recorded in the Rig Veda.

=== Episode 2 – "The Power of Ideas" ===
The second episode in Michael Wood's series moves on to the revolutionary years after 500BC – the Age of the Buddha and Mahavira. Travelling by rail to the ancient cities of the Ganges plain, by army convoy through Northern Iraq, and down Pakistan's Khyber Pass, he shows how Alexander the Great's invasion of India inspired her first major empire in the form of the Mauryan Empire, ruled by Chandragupta Maurya.

=== Episode 3 – "Spice Routes and Silk Roads" ===
Episode 3 describes how, after the bell rang and subsequent exploitation of the monsoon winds, trading of spices and gold with the ancient Romans and Greeks put the subcontinent at the heart of global commerce. The trading of pepper, rice and silk put peninsular India on the map of global business.

This episode also looks at how the invading Kushan empire from Central Asia, particularly the emperor Kanishka, established major trading cities in Peshawar and Mathura, as well as helping to take Buddhism to China.

=== Episode 4 – "Ages of Gold" ===
The achievements of the country's golden age, including how India discovered zero, calculated the circumference of the Earth and wrote the world's first sex guide, the Kama Sutra. In the south, the giant temple of Tanjore built by emperor Rajaraja Chola and traditional bronze casters, working as their ancestors did 1,000 years ago are shown. Michael Wood calls Tamil Nadu, "the only surviving 'Classical Civilization' in the world".

In an interview to The Hindu Michael Wood said, "One that's 2,000 years old like ancient Greece or Rome, Tamil is the last living classical Indian language.The first surviving work in Tamil, a 300 BC book on linguistics, refers to an already existing culture. Tamil is older than any modern European language. I wanted to remind Western-centric audiences, who implicitly assume the superiority of Western modes of thought, that Tamil is one of 23 official Indian languages, with a literature comparable to any in the West. It makes viewers sit up and question their assumptions".

=== Episode 5 – "The Meeting of Two Oceans" ===
The documentary series about the history of India charts the coming of Islam to the subcontinent and one of the greatest ages of world civilisation: the Mughals. Mahmud of Ghazni leads an expedition to Somnath and destroys the temple of Shiva and all idols there. Michael Wood visits Sufi shrines in Old Delhi, desert fortresses in Rajasthan and the cities of Lahore and Agra, where he offers a new theory on the design of the Taj Mahal. He also looks at the life of Akbar, a Muslim emperor who decreed that no one religion could hold the ultimate truth, but whose dream of unity ended in civil war. In the narrative he movingly describes the murder of Darah Shikuh.

=== Episode 6 – "Freedom" ===
This episode examines the British Raj and India's struggle for freedom. Wood reveals how, in South India, a global corporation came to control much of the subcontinent, and explores the magical culture of Lucknow, discovering the enigmatic Briton who helped found the freedom movement. He traces the Amritsar massacre, the rise of Gandhi and Nehru, and the events that led to the Partition of India in 1947.

== Merchandise ==
- An accompanying hardback book and audio book has been published by BBC Books on 16 August 2007, titled Michael Wood: The Story of India (ISBN 9780563539155).
- A 2-disc Region 2 DVD was released by 2 Entertain on 5 November 2007 (BBCDVD2375), featuring all six full-length episodes.
- A 2-disc Region 1 DVD was released by PBS Home Video on 10 March 2009.
- A 2-disc Region A Blu-ray Disc was released by PBS Home Video on 14 April 2009.
- A 2-disc Region 4 DVD and Blu-ray Disc was released by ABC DVD/Village Roadshow on 1 July 2009.

== Re-runs ==
In the United States, PBS broadcast the series on three consecutive Mondays, 5 to 19 January 2009, from 0900pm to 1100pm. In Australia, the series was broadcast on ABC1 each Sunday at 0730pm from 29 March until 3 May 2009. In India, the series was broadcast on the Discovery Channel in 2008.

== Reception ==
Kevin McDonough of United Feature Syndicate wrote, "A great story, big ideas and dazzling photography."

== See also ==
- Land of the Tiger
- Welcome to India
