= King Alfred and the Anglo Saxons =

2013 British TV documentary series

- Genre: Factual
- Written by: Michael Wood
- Presented by: Michael Wood
- Composer: Howard Davidson
- Country of origin: United Kingdom
- Original language: English
- No. of series: 1
- No. of episodes: 3

Production
- Executive producers: Martin Davidson (BBC); Sally Thomas (Maya)
- Producer: Rebecca Dobbs
- Cinematography: Peter Harvey; Jon Wood; Steven Gray
- Running time: 58-60 mins
- Production company: Maya Vision International for BBC

Original release
- Network: BBC
- Release: 6 August – 20 August 2013

King Alfred and the Anglo Saxons is a 2013 documentary in three parts written and presented by Michael Wood.

== Episodes ==
No.	Title	Original release date
1	"Alfred of Wessex"	6 August 2013
2	"The Lady of the Mercians"	13 August 2013
3	"Aethelstan, the First King of England"	20 August 2013

== Experts ==
Janet Nelson

Helena Hamerow

Rory Naismith
