= Peter Goodchild =

British television editor (1939–2025)

Peter Goodchild FRSC
- Born: 18 August 1939
- Died: 6 May 2025 (aged 85)
- Education: St John's College, Oxford
- Occupations: Television editor, producer and executive
- Years active: 1965–94
- Employer: BBC Television
- Known for: Horizon, Q.E.D., Screen One, Screen Two, Screenplay

Peter Robert Edward Goodchild FRSC (18 August 1939 – 6 May 2025) was a British television editor at the BBC, who notably edited Horizon and initiated the popular 1980s BBC science series Q.E.D..

== Early life and education ==
Goodchild was born on 18 August 1939. He studied at St John's College, Oxford. Before Oxford, he was a student at Aldenham, located near Elstree, Herts.

== Career ==
=== BBC ===
Goodchild joined the BBC's Horizon, becoming a producer from 1965-69. From 1969-76 he was Editor of Horizon, at the time the series was much in its heyday and essential viewing for many people. Under him, it won a BAFTA award (British Academy Television Awards) in 1972 and 1974 for Best Factual Series.

He was the executive producer of the BAFTA Award-winning series "Marie Curie" (1977), with John Glenister as the director, which won the award for Best Drama Series and Serial and Jane Lapotaire as nomination for British Academy Television Award for Best Actress with same film.

After the success of "Marie Curie", Goodchild continued his production and start production of Oppenheimer (1980) with Barry Davis as director and Peter Prince as screenwriter. This series became product of collaboration between BBC with WGBH. The series won the award for Best Drama Series and Serial and Best Original Television Music which won by Carl Davis. This series also got Sam Waterston a nomination for Best Actor.

From 1980-84 he was BBC Television's Head of Science & Features; in this position he created QED. From 1984-89 he branched out, away from science, becoming BBC Television's Head of Plays; in this position, he created Screen One, Screen Two and Screenplay. From 1989-94 he was an executive producer in the BBC Film department.

=== Playwright ===
Goodchild wrote several plays for L.A. Theatre Works.

== Death ==
Goodchild died on 6 May 2025, at the age of 85.

Media offices
Preceded by	Editor: Horizon; 1969–1974	Succeeded by
Preceded by	BBC TV: Head of Science and Features; 1980–1984	Succeeded by
Preceded by	BBC TV: Head of Plays; 1984–1989	Succeeded by
