= Roger Laughton =

British television producer (1942–2025)

Roger Froome Laughton, CBE, FRTS (19 May 1942 – 20 August 2025) was a British BAFTA-winning television producer who was Chief Executive of Meridian Television.

== Life and career ==
Laughton attended the state boys' grammar school King Edward VII School, Sheffield (KES). He studied at Merton College, Oxford, gaining a degree in History in 1963, and a DipEd from the Institute of Education in Oxford the following year.

He was a television producer for the BBC from 1965–90, working on programmes such as Michael Wood's In Search of the Dark Ages and Great Railway Journeys of the World. On 27 October 1986 he launched the BBC Daytime service. In November 2006, he produced the Laughton Report, which found that the local BBC television services were disruptive to local newspapers, but employed fewer journalists.

From 1991 to 1996, he was the Chief Executive of Meridian Broadcasting (now ITV Meridian). He received the CBE in the 2000 New Year Honours for services to regional broadcasting. He became a Fellow of the Royal Television Society in 1994. Laughton married Suzanne Taylor in 1967, and they had a daughter, Catherine.

Laughton died on 20 August 2025, at the age of 83.

Media offices
Preceded by	Chairman of South West Screen; 2004 - 2010	Succeeded by
Preceded by New television franchise	Chief Executive of Meridian Broadcasting; 1991 - 1996	Succeeded by
Preceded by	Director of BBC Enterprises; 1987 - 1990	Succeeded by
Preceded by	Head of Daytime Programmes at BBC Television; 1985 - 1987	Succeeded by
Preceded by	Head of Network Features at BBC Television; 1980 - 1985	Succeeded by
