= FIFA Futbol Mundial =

Television sports program

- Theme music composer: Simon Woodgate
- Opening theme: "Fifa Futbol Mundial"
- Ending theme: "Fifa Futbol Mundial"

Production
- Production company: IMG Sports

FIFA Futbol Mundial was a football-related magazine show produced by IMG Sports Media in conjunction with FIFA. It ran from 1994 to at least 2014. FIFA maintained a YouTube playlist of the same name until 2016.

== Overview ==
The show was started in 1994 by former ITV football commentator Gerry Harrison, with Stewart Binns as executive producer. The initial production team was Peter Matthew Hutton, Guy Oliver, Jamie Baker, Tony Williamson and Michael Stolz. The show has been produced every week from that date and is seen throughout the world. There have been several other shows that have tried to cover similar ground over the years – including the Octagon show Western Union World Football and the FIFA show FIFA TV. However, Futbol Mundial has outlasted all of them. It was normally broadcast on Tuesdays then repeated during the rest of the week.

== International airings ==
Country	TV network(s)
Argentina	TyC Sports (Tuesday and Thursday at 11:00 pm)
Australia	SBS
Brazil	ESPN Brasil
Bulgaria	Ring.BG
Chile	CDF
Colombia	Win Sports
Denmark	TV3 Sport 1
Ecuador	TV CABLE Group (Channels 15, 102 and 761)
Germany	Sky Sport
Greece	Nova Sports
India	TEN Sports
Iran	Manoto 1
Japan	Gaora, NHK BS-1
Latin America	DirecTV and SKY
Lithuania	Sport1
Mexico	Televisa Canal 9
Mongolia	SPS, Sansar HD
Morocco	2M Maroc
Netherlands	Eredivisie Live
Pakistan	TEN Sports
Paraguay	Tigo Sports (Friday at 1:30 pm and Sunday at 7:45 am).
Peru	CMD (Monday to Saturday at 06:00 am, 04:15 pm and 08:30 pm)
Poland	Polsat Sport and TV 4
Portugal	SportTV
Spain	Canal+ Fútbol
Sweden	Canal+
Taiwan	csky
Thailand	True Sport
Turkey	NTV Spor
Ukraine	Football TV Channel
United Kingdom	Sky Sports
Uruguay	VTV Sports (Monday to Sunday at 8:00 am, 1:00 pm and 8:00 pm)
Venezuela	Meridiano Televisión (Monday to Friday at 06:00 pm and 11:00 pm; Saturday and Sunday at 7:00 am and 1:00 pm)
