= In the Footsteps of Alexander the Great =

- Genre: Documentary
- Written by: Michael Wood
- Directed by: David Wallace
- Presented by: Michael Wood
- Composer: John Eacott
- Country of origin: United Kingdom
- Original language: English
- No. of series: 1
- No. of episodes: 4

Production
- Executive producers: Leo Eaton (PBS); Laurence Rees (BBC)
- Producer: Rebecca Dobbs
- Cinematography: Peter Harvey; Linette Frewin; Alistair Cameron; Peter Jeuvenal
- Running time: 57-60 minutes
- Production company: Maya Vision International

Original release
- Network: BBC2
- Release: 14 July – 4 August 1998

In the Footsteps of Alexander the Great is a BBC documentary television series, first shown in 1998. Written and presented by historian and broadcaster Michael Wood, it retraced the travels of Alexander the Great, from Macedonia to the borders of India and back to Mesopotamia.

== Production ==
Wood was prevented by the government of Greece from interviewing Eugene N. Borza, a professor specializing in the history of Macedonia, anywhere within Greece, apparently because of Borza's controversial views on the ethnic differences between the Greeks and Macedonians in ancient times.

== Episodes ==
Episode one: Son of God

Macedonia to Turkey

First broadcast on BBC2 on 14 July 1998

Episode two: Lord of Asia

Zagros to Persepolis

First broadcast on BBC2 on 21 July 1998

Episode three: Across the Hindu Kush

The golden road to Samarkand

First broadcast on BBC2 on 28 July 1998

Episode four: To The Ends of the Earth

Pakistan to Babylon

First broadcast on BBC2 on 4 August 1998

== Broadcast and release ==
The series was broadcast in the United States on PBS on 4 and 5 May 1998.

The series was released on DVD by BBC Worldwide, and on DVD by PBS Home Video in 2004.

== Reception ==
In an article published in Summer 1998, Eugene N. Borza expressed approval of the series but was unhappy with the accompanying book.

== Book ==
The book In the Footsteps of Alexander the Great: A Journey from Greece to Asia, by Michael Wood, is a companion to the television series. It was published, by the University of California Press in Berkeley and Los Angeles, by Routledge in New York, in 1997.

The book was ranked fifth in the original non-fiction section of the Bookwatch bestsellers list published in The Independent on 14 August 1998, and was included in the lists published on 28 August and 18 September 1998.

== See also ==
- In the Footsteps of Marco Polo
