= 40 Minutes =

British TV series (1981–1994)

- Strand logo
- Genre: Documentary

Original release
- Release: 1981 – 1994

40 Minutes was a BBC TV documentary strand broadcast on BBC Two between 1981 and 1994.

Some documentaries in the original series were revisited and updated in a 2006 version, Forty Minutes On.

== See also ==
- Sixty Minutes
