= William Norman (cricketer) =

New Zealand cricketer

Personal information
- Full name: William Bruce Norman
- Born: 4 March 1932; Auckland, New Zealand
- Died: 25 November 2009 (aged 77); Auckland, New Zealand
- Source: ESPNcricinfo, 19 June 2016

William Bruce Norman (4 March 1932 – 25 November 2009) was a New Zealand cricketer. He played twenty first-class matches for Auckland between 1959 and 1963.

== See also ==
- List of Auckland representative cricketers
