= Fighter Pilot (TV series) =

- Genre: Documentary; Reality television
- Created by: Colin Strong
- Narrated by: Michael Dean
- Theme music composer: Don Percival
- Country of origin: United Kingdom
- Original language: English
- No. of episodes: 8

Production
- Running time: 30 minutes

Original release
- Network: BBC One
- Release: 9 September – 28 October 1981

Fighter Pilot is a BBC television documentary series that was broadcast in the UK on BBC One, from 9 September to 28 October 1981. It was about the training of fast jet pilots in the Royal Air Force and followed the progress of six candidates as they went through the three-year programme. The BBC and the RAF first agreed to work together on a documentary in 1978, when there was a poor level of recruitment and a shortage of pilots in the service. At the time it cost £1 million to train a pilot (£4 million in 2011). The training process, from selection to operational service has a high drop-out rate and only one of the six original candidates went on to fly fast jets.

Three of the candidates were airmen who already served in the RAF, while the others were from civilian backgrounds (qualified nurse, zoologist and milkman/farm worker). The series was produced by Colin Strong, who closely followed the candidates for three-and-a-half years. To gain a detailed insight in to the process, he undertook the RAF basic flying training course himself and flew solo in a Jet Provost. The series was nominated for a BAFTA award in 1982 for Television Factual Series.

== Candidates ==
Candidate	Age	Background
John McCrea	22	Coalman, farm worker, milkman
Robbie Low	21	State registered nurse
Martin Oxborrow	25	Weapons technician at RAF Marham
Alistair Stewart	22	Zoologist
Trevor Lewis	19	Technician at RAF Odiham
Rhod Smart	20	Air fitter on Lightnings at RAF Binbrook

== Episodes ==
No.	Title	Original release date
1	"Dreams"	9 September 1981
The series begins in May 1978, when thirty-one applicants arrive at the Officer and Aircrew Selection Centre at RAF Biggin Hill. Six of the candidates are offered pilot training.
2	"Officers and Gentlemen"	16 September 1981
In September 1978, the candidates arrive at the RAF Officer Cadet Training Unit at RAF Henlow for their 18-week officer training course.
3	"Graduation"	23 September 1981
Five of the candidates graduate from the Officer Cadet Training Unit.
4	"Going Solo"	30 September 1981
In March 1979, the five officer cadets move to the Basic Flying Training School (BFTS) at RAF Linton-on-Ouse, where they learn to fly the Jet Provost. One of the Qualified Flying Instructors (QFIs) on the course is Flt Lt Martin Withers.
5	"Chopped"	7 October 1981
All of the five candidates make their first solo flights.
6	"Fear of Failing"	14 October 1981
The candidates progress through the basic flying training course.
7	"Wings"	21 October 1981
In March 1980, the remaining candidates move to the Advanced Flying School at RAF Valley for 21 weeks of advanced flying training on the Hawk T.1.
8	"Sport of Kings"	28 October 1981
In October 1980, the remaining candidates moves to the Tactical Weapons Unit (TWU) at RAF Brawdy, to learn the art of aerial warfare on the Hawk.

== Book ==
A book of the television series was produced by Colin Strong and co-written with the author, Duff Hart-Davis.
