= Peter Prince =

British novelist (1942–2026)

Peter Alan Prince (10 May 1942 – 22 September 2026) was a British novelist.

== Life and career ==
Peter Alan Prince was born in Bromley, Kent, England, on 10 May 1942. He studied in America, earning a degree in history from the University of Pennsylvania on a Thouron Award scholarship (then awarded in a few cases for undergraduate study), and a master's in the same field at Columbia University. Returning to the UK in 1966, he began doctoral studies at Cambridge University but did not complete the degree. His first novel Play Things won the Somerset Maugham Award in 1973. He was nominated for an Emmy Award for Outstanding Writing in a Limited Series or a Special for his work on the 1980 BBC miniseries Oppenheimer. His 1983 novel The Good Father was adapted into a 1985 film of the same name starring Anthony Hopkins. His novel Adam Runaway (LCCN 2005-40821) was published in 2005; Publisher's Weekly called it "vapid" and "plodding", saying, "Although historically colorful, the story has little suspense, less humor and feeble action." Prince died on 22 September 2026, aged 84.

== Bibliography ==
- Play Things (1972), novel, LCCN 73-160411
- Oppenheimer (1980), teleplay
- The Good Father (1983), novel
- The Great Circle (1997), novel, LCCN 96-37882
- Adam Runaway (2005), novel, LCCN 2005-40821
