= In Search of the Trojan War =

- Region 1 DVD cover
- Genre: History documentary
- Written by: Michael Wood
- Directed by: Bill Lyons
- Presented by: Michael Wood
- Composers: Terry Oldfield; David Pash
- Country of origin: United Kingdom
- Original language: English
- No. of series: 1
- No. of episodes: 6

Production
- Executive producer: Colin Adams
- Producer: Bill Lyons
- Running time: approximately 345 minutes in total
- Production company: BBC

Original release
- Network: BBC2
- Release: 24 February – 31 March 1985

In Search of the Trojan War is a six-part BBC TV documentary series written and presented by Michael Wood, first broadcast in 1985 on BBC2. It examines the extent to which historical and archeological evidence matches the tale of the Trojan War as recounted by Homer in The Iliad.

== Outline ==
In Search of the Trojan War was the first follow-up series to Michael Wood's initial major broadcasting success, the documentary series In Search of the Dark Ages, which the BBC had aired between 1979 and 1981.

The essence of the new series was to expand the successful format of the eight programmes of the earlier series, such that instead of searching for a single historical character in each programme, all six programmes would search for the true story behind a single historical figure, Helen of Troy.

Wood compares to what extent the historical and archeological evidence matches with the tale of the Trojan War. To this end he interviewed numerous experts including Elizabeth French, George E. Mylonas, Colin Renfrew, and Donald F. Easton, among others.

Many cities have come and gone, bearing the name Troy, in the historical record of Asia Minor. Michael Wood seeks the evidence for each of them, and analyses whether the details match Homer's account of the city.

Michael Wood's motivation was to seek a legend: a character as deeply embedded in the collective memory of his audience as King Arthur had been in the earlier series; he sought Helen, the face that launched a thousand ships, although, as he himself remarks, romance is something which leaves no traces in the archaeological record.

== Episodes ==
- 1985-02-24 : Episode 1: The Age of the Heroes - outlines the story of the Trojan War and introduces the work of Heinrich Schliemann
- 1985-03-03 : Episode 2: The Legend Under Siege - explores the work of those who followed Schliemann such as Wilhelm Dörpfeld, Arthur Evans and Carl Blegen
- 1985-03-10 : Episode 3: The Singer of Tales - discusses Homer and the bardic tradition
- 1985-03-17 : Episode 4: The Women of Troy
- 1985-03-24 : Episode 5: Empire of the Hittites
- 1985-03-31 : Episode 6: The Fall of Troy

== Book ==
Wood also wrote a book based on the series. C. Brian Rose considered the 1996 edition "the best overall treatment in English of the evidence for the Trojan War." The 1998 edition includes a new final chapter to take into account more recent developments in the search for Troy.
