= Bettina Lerner =

British television producer

- Born: 7 August 1957 (age 68)
- Occupation: television producer
- Known for: career at BBC
- Notable work: Series Editor of the BBC science series Horizon
- Awards: BAFTA (Television) factual series award for Horizon

Bettina Lerner (born 7 August 1957) is a television producer, and a former Series Editor of the BBC science series Horizon.

== Early life ==
Her background is in anthropology.

== Career ==
=== BBC ===
Bettina Lerner was lead researcher for the BBC series The Day the Universe Changed, which was first broadcast in 1985.

She was deputy series editor of Horizon from 1998 to 1999, becoming series editor in 1999. She has written and produced for the series as well. Around 18 documentaries a year would be made for the series.

In July 1998, she won an annual award (for television) from the Association of British Science Writers (ABSW).

In 2002, she won the BAFTA (Television) factual series award for Horizon.

== Personal life ==
She lives in west London.

Media offices
Preceded by	Series Editor of Horizon; 1999–2001	Succeeded by
