= Grant McKee =

Canadian football player (born 1940)

Profile
- Position: Halfback

Personal information
- Born: September 14, 1940
- Died: January 10, 2018
- Listed height: 6 ft 1 in (1.85 m)
- Listed weight: 195 lb (88 kg)

Career information
- College: Michigan

Career history
- 1961–1963: Hamilton Tiger-Cats
- 1964: Edmonton Eskimos
- 1965: Toronto Argonauts
- 1965: Edmonton Eskimos
- 1968: Toronto Argonauts

Awards and highlights
- Grey Cup champion (1963)

Grant McKee (born September 14, 1940) is a Canadian football player who played for the Hamilton Tiger-Cats, Edmonton Eskimos and Toronto Argonauts. He won the Grey Cup with the Tiger-Cats in 1963. He played college football at the University of Michigan.
