= Stewart Binns =

British author and filmmaker (born 1950)

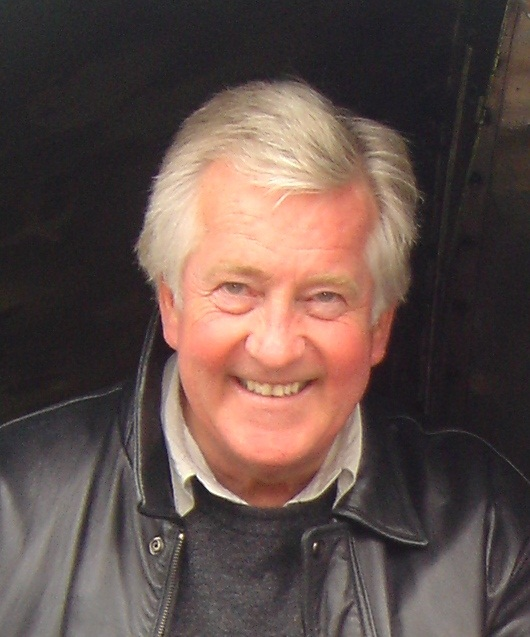
- Born: 2 August 1950 (age 76); Lancaster, Lancashire, UK
- Education: University of Lancaster University of Sussex University of London
- Occupations: Writer, Documentary Filmmaker
- Spouse: Lucy Binns
- Children: Adam, Charlie, Jack Grandchildren Sam, Jess
- Writing career
- Language: English
- Genres: History, adventure, mystery, military
- Notable works: Lionheart; Anarchy; Shadow of War 'The Darkness and the Thunder'/ 'Betrayal'; Conquest; Trans World Sport; In-Colour Series; Barbarossa; Japan’s War "Blood Sweat and Glory, A Celebration of Sport"
- Notable awards: BAFTA; Grierson; Peabody; Royal Television Society; British Independent Film
- Website: stewartbinns.com

Stewart Binns (born 2 August 1950) is a British author and filmmaker who has produced many BAFTA, Grierson and Peabody award-winning documentaries.

== Early life ==
Binns was born in Lancaster and brought up in Burnley, Lancashire by his single mother. After failing his 11-plus examination he went to St Theodore's Secondary Modern School and then on to Burnley Municipal College for his A-levels. From here Binns went on to study a BA in Politics & Modern History at Lancaster University and then an MA in International Relations at the University of Sussex. He also holds an MSc in Sociology of Education from the University of London.

== Career ==
In 1974, while working at Lancaster University for a doctorate focused on political behaviour, and realising he was getting nowhere with it, he got a job at the BBC in their Audience Research Department doing a study of the influence of the media during the 1975 United Kingdom European Communities membership referendum. He then became a schoolteacher for several years and in 1980 passed selection for 21 SAS, for which he served until 1983. In 1985, he re-joined the BBC and worked in Current Affairs and Documentary Features, including a stint on Panorama. He later joined Trans World International, the television arm of Mark McCormack's International Management Group, where he worked for 20 years and became its Director of Special Projects. After a brief period as Head of Production at Octagon CSI, in 2006, he began his own media company, Big Ape Media with his wife, Lucy.

=== Film work ===
==== Historical ====
Binns' history television credits include the 'In-Colour' genre of programmes – notably the BAFTA and Grierson winner, Britain at War in Colour, and the Peabody winner, The Second World War in Colour.

His other historical work includes Chasing Churchill: In Search of My Grandfather broadcast on PBS, in which Celia Sandys, Winston Churchill's granddaughter travels the world, including the United States, France, Morocco and South Africa, in search of her grandfather's legacy.

More recently Binns' television productions have involved a shift of perspective towards the Orient. Indochine: A People's War in Colour (2009) tells the story of the people of Indochina and their battle to gain their freedom over three decades and through three wars. This was followed by Korea: The Forgotten War in Colour (2010) the story of the 1950–53 Korean War. Then came, Seisen: the Rise and Fall of the Japanese Empire (2012) – a history of Japan's militaristic ambitions during the first half of the 20th century, including their role in World War II. His latest productions include, India: A Visual Homage, a history of India from 1900 to 1985, Mao, A Study in Tyranny, The Life of Mao Tse Tung, The Handshake for Peace, the story of the FIFA peace initiative and Paris 1924, The IOC/Alibaba 1924 Colourisation Project to celebrate 2024 Paris Olympic Games.

==== Sport ====
Binns has also produced a number of sporting programmes and projects. He launched the successful and still-running Trans World Sport in 1987. In 1993 he launched, and was the first Executive Producer of, FIFA Futbol Mundial one of the longest running football-based magazine shows still on the air.

Next he instituted the Olympic Games Camera of Record in 1994 – with a single camera crew and access to all areas, Binns captured the magic and atmosphere of the Games in a personal, behind-the-scenes style at each Games, from Lillehammer (1994) to Athens (2004). Throughout the 1990s Binns produced a number of other Olympic documentaries, including "Olympic Century" (1994), the IOC's official centennial history, and The Olympic Series (1998).

Binns also launched, and ran for 10 years, the Olympic Television Archive Bureau. An organisation that was instrumental in retrieving and restoring all the official films of the Olympic Games right back to the 1936 Berlin Games.

Binns served as a producer on the 2024 production "Daley: Olympic Superstar" for the BBC - a documentary film which chronicles the life of Daley Thompson including his legendary sporting achievements, but, for the first time, also reveals the personal struggles he faced to rise from the humblest of beginnings to become the ultimate Olympian.

Away from the Olympics, Binns also produced the official biographical documentary of Tiger Woods, Tiger (2003), the official history of the Wimbledon Championships Wimbledon (2001) and FIFA's official history of football, The People's Game (1989).

=== Written work ===
==== Historical fiction ====
Binns has written 6 historical novels, four in the Making of England quartet, and two about the Great War. His first novel, Conquest – based on the events surrounding the Norman invasion of England in 1066 – was published by Penguin Books in 2011. It was soon followed by Crusade (released in April 2012), focusing on the Norman rule of England after 1066 and the First Crusade to the Holy Land. Next came Anarchy (released in June 2013), which tells the story of England's first civil war between Stephen and Matilda. The quartet was completed with his latest novel Lionheart (released in November 2013), about the adventures of Richard the Lionheart and the Third Crusade. His two Great War books are the Shadow of War about the catastrophic events of 1914 and its sequel the Darkness and the Thunder set in 1915. In February 2018, he released a book set in Belfast, during the Troubles, entitled Betrayal.

==== Non-fiction ====
Binns' non-fiction writing credits include: The Greatest: Who is Britain’s Top Sports Star? (1996), The Second World War in Colour (1999) Britain at War in Colour (2000), America at War in Colour (2001), British Empire in Colour (2002), Barbarossa, The Bloodiest War in History (2021) and Japan’s War, Hirohito’s Holy War Against the West (2025) Blood Sweat and Glory, A Celebration of Sport (2027)

== Personal life ==
His home is in Somerset, England, where he lives with Lucy and twin boys, Charlie and Jack.

== Bibliography ==
=== Historical fiction ===
==== The Great War series ====
- Shadow of War (2014)
- The Darkness and the Thunder (2015)

==== Making of England quartet ====
- Lionheart (2013)
- Anarchy (2013)
- Crusade (2012)
- Conquest (2011)

==== Contemporary ====
- Betrayal (2018)

=== Non-fiction ===
- Blood Sweat and Glory, A Celebration of Sport (2027)
- Japan’s War, Hirohito’s Holy War Against the West (2025)
- Barbarossa and the Bloodiest War in History (2021)
- British Empire in Colour (2002)
- America at War in Colour (2001)
- Britain at War in Colour (2000)
- The Second World War in Colour (1999)
- The Greatest: Who is Britain's Top Sports Star? (1996)

== Filmography ==
- Daley Olympic Superstar (2024)
- IOC/Alibaba 1924 Colourisation Project (2024)
- Legends of Cricket (2022)
- Dream the Dream (2019)
- A Journey of Hope(2017)
- Chuan's Ocean (2016)
- Mao: A Study in Tyranny (2015)
- A Journey of Hope (2014)
- Sport Under Threat (2012)
- Seisen: the Rise and Fall of the Japanese Empire (2012)
- Korea: The Forgotten War in Colour (2010)
- Indochine: A People's War in Colour (2009)
- Phil Daniels’ Football Matchday Madness (2008)
- Catalyst for Change (2007)
- Inside the Lions’ Den (2006)
- What Price Fame (2006)
- The Football League Show (2005)
- Golazo (2005)
- Chasing Churchill: In Search of My Grandfather (2005)
- Tiger: The Authorised Biography (2004)
- Japan's War (2003)
- Churchill (2003)
- The British Empire in Colour (2002)
- The Queen Mother: Her Reign in Colour 1937–1953 (2001)
- Apollo (2002)
- Britain at War in Colour (2001)
- The Second World War in Colour (2000)
- Inventions (1999)
- Fabulous Fortunes (1998)
- The Olympic Series (1998)
- Century (1997)
- McCormack – A Journey through Contemporary Sport (1996)
- Mountain Airs (1995)
- Olympic Century (1994)
- Futbol Mundial (1993)
- Guardians of the Flame (1992)
- Blood, Sweat and Glory (1991)
- Fangio (1991)
- The People's Game (1991)
- Simon Combes: An African Experience (1989)
- Artworld (1989)
- Trans World Sport (1987)
