= Howard Davidson =

British composer

Howard Davidson is a composer of music for film, television, radio and the theatre.

Davidson has over 300 scores to his credit, many in collaboration with noted documentary maker Michael Wood and made for the BBC and PBS. His orchestral scores have been performed by the BBC Concert Orchestra, and both the Royal Philharmonic and Philharmonia Orchestras. Radio credits include Iris Murdoch's Under the Net, Nabokov's Laughter in the Dark and Terre Haute by Edmund White. For television, recent productions include Titanic-Birth of a Legend and Michael Wood's In Search of Shakespeare, In Search of Myths & Heroes and more recently The Story of India.

He is a Professor of Composition for Screen at the Royal College of Music, London.
