= American Visions =

1997 book by Robert Hughes

American Visions: The Epic History of Art in America
- First edition
- Author: Robert Hughes
- Language: English
- Subject: Non-fiction, American Art History
- Published: 1997 (The Harvill Press)
- Publication place: England
- Media type: Print (Hardback)
- Pages: 635
- ISBN: 978-0676527841
- OCLC: 901568324

American Visions: The Epic History of Art in America is a 1997 book by art critic Robert Hughes. It was also turned into a 8-part documentary series featuring the author.

== Contents ==
O My America, My New Founde Land
The Republic of Virtue
The Wilderness and the West
American Renaissance
The Gritty Cities
Early Modernism
Streamlines and Breadlines
The Empire of Signs
The Age of Anxiety

== Reception ==
Kirkus Reviews gave a starred review and described it as an "eminently readable handbook on American art", writing: "His readings of three centuries of both art works and trends are lively, detailed, and persuasive (though perhaps a bit too harsh regarding recent art), and his ultimately pessimistic take is expressed with great clarity. A meaty and illuminating excavation, full of vigor and punch..." Publishers Weekly noted "this is no bland, dumbed-down survey intended to flatter its subject or its audience. Hughes writes with an aesthete's disdain for political posturing, a traditionalist's belief in the importance of technical skills (painters are frequently taken to task for their shoddy draftsmanship) and a pragmatist's contempt for mystagogical bunk", but found "his account of the contemporary scene is disappointingly brief," concluding: "This slashingly witty, briskly paced, ferociously opinionated tour of the American visual landscape is a book that even the most un-likeminded readers will love to hate."

A review by The New York Times calls it a "witty and impassioned history of American art from its beginnings to the present day", "beautiful and essential", notes that "Mr. Hughes fortunately remains the critic throughout his historical canvassing, making distinctions and judgments without taking sides," and concluding: "With it, Mr. Hughes has made American art safe for the receptive alien deep inside us all." American Visions has also been reviewed by the London Review of Books, The Journal of American History, and The New York Review of Books.
