= The House (TV series) =

1995 British documentary television series

- Genre: Documentary
- Directed by: Michael Waldman
- Narrated by: Jancis Robinson
- Country of origin: United Kingdom
- Original language: English
- No. of series: 1
- No. of episodes: 6

Production
- Executive producer: Edward Mirzoeff
- Producer: Andrew Bethell
- Production locations: Royal Opera House, Covent Garden, Westminster, London, England, UK
- Production company: BBC Productions

Original release
- Network: BBC2
- Release: 16 January – 20 February 1996

The House is a "fly on the wall" documentary television series in six episodes which showed various behind-the-scenes events at the Royal Opera House, Covent Garden. It was filmed by the BBC in 1995, and first broadcast on BBC2 in early 1996 to an audience of four million viewers.

== A docusoap precursor ==
Stella Bruzzi, in New documentary, describes the series as having been "the immediate precursor to docusoaps (which the BBC produced) and factual entertainment." The production team was "directly involved in illustrating and manufacturing the confrontations and issues raised by its content, most concretely through Jancis Robinson's arch and critical voice-over".

== Episodes ==
1. (16 January) Star Struck: Denyce Graves makes her debut as Carmen
2. (23 January) Horse Trading: The budgets for Káťa Kabanová and The Sleeping Beauty have been overspent by more than £240,000; slippery floors and rival ballerinas cause further problems.
3. (30 January) Foot Fault: Thomas Allen receives an urgent call-up to appear in The Marriage of Figaro, as fellow baritone Jeffrey Black has lost his voice. Allen has not previously appeared in this production.
4. (6 February) High Hopes: Protracted discussions about pay take place between management and trade unions; traditionalists and modernists battle over a revival of Harrison Birtwistle's Gawain.
5. (13 February) Settling Scores: Nicholas Payne, Director of Opera, tries to balance business and art.
6. (20 February) Winning Ticket: Established older dancers of The Royal Ballet have to be laid off in order to save money."

== Reception and aftermath ==
The series received a lot of publicity. Reactions in the press and elsewhere perhaps came as a surprise to the staff of the Opera House, who had co-operated with the film-makers. Indeed the senior management had seen it twice before transmission, without raising any complaints. The BBC's website noted that the documentary "disclosed the rifts and acrimony behind the scenes"; New York magazine commented "A six-part BBC documentary revealed the establishment to be as rife with power struggles and diva fits offstage as on." Michael Kaiser, who became general director of the Opera House in 1998, remarked that "The House only confirmed the general belief that the Royal Opera House was, at best, incompetent, and, at worst, completely devoted to the needs of the rich."

However, while Peter Popham in The Independent mentioned the "six-week display of dirty laundry courtesy of the BBC's documentary cameras", he later pointed out that "for all the moaning about unfairness that preceded the showing of The House, the documentary series has done Covent Garden enormous good in terms of public interest; requests to join the mailing list have poured in, and ticket sales are up. Whatever the backstage controversies the programme exposed, it also revealed the true glamour and excitement of an opera house's work, which has nothing to do with tedious arguments about elitism."

Keith Cooper, the Opera House's public-relations director, seen dismissing staff in The House, reappeared on TV for a seventh episode in July 1998. The Royal Opera House refused to co-operate. "the cameras were denied entry to the building, and the new chairman, Sir Colin Southgate, forbade staff from participating."

The House débâcle is still remembered. In 2010, Laura Battle, in an article in The Financial Times about an outreach initiative by Glyndebourne Festival Opera, remarked "Ever since The House – the notorious BBC documentary series on the Royal Opera House in the mid-1990s that revealed embittered staff and shocking mismanagement of finances, and had disastrous consequences for the company – arts institutions have been very guarded about television exposure."

== Awards ==
In 1996, the series won the Emmy Arts Documentary award at the International Emmys, and was nominated for a RTS Television Award for Best Tape & Film Editing - Documentary & Factual.

In 1997, it won the award for Best Factual Series in the British Academy Television Awards 1997 and the Broadcasting Press Guild Award for Best Documentary Series, and was nominated for a BAFTA TV Award for Best Editing (Factual).

It also won the Royal Philharmonic Society 1996 Music Award for Radio, Television and Video.

== Available recordings ==
The series has never been released on DVD, although it was released by Kultur on VHS tape in 1997. Nor, despite its many awards, was it never repeated on TV. The entire series is currently available digitally online.
