= Great Ormond Street (TV series) =

UK television series

- Directed by: Ricardo Pollack; Simon Gilchrist
- Composer: Miguel d'Oliveira
- Country of origin: United Kingdom
- Original language: English
- No. of series: 3
- No. of episodes: 12

Production
- Executive producer: Roger Graef
- Production location: Great Ormond Street Hospital
- Running time: 60 minutes
- Production company: BBC

Original release
- Network: BBC Two
- Release: 6 April 2010 – 12 August 2015

Great Ormond Street is a British television documentary series. It was first broadcast on BBC Two on 6 April 2010. Each episode focuses on a different department at the Great Ormond Street Hospital for Children in London.

A second series aired in 2012. A third series aired in summer 2015.

== Background ==
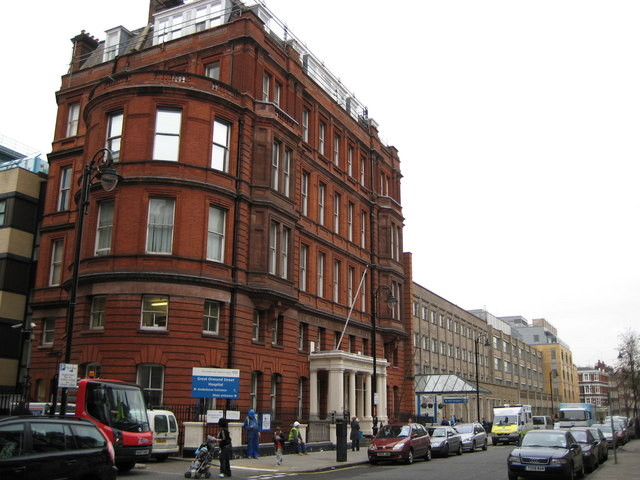
The Great Ormond Street Hospital in Central London

Great Ormond Street Hospital is a hospital specialising in the care of children in the district of Bloomsbury, Central London. It was founded in 1852 as the Hospital for Sick Children, making it the first hospital providing in-patient beds specifically for children in the English-speaking world. Today, the hospital still engages in pioneering work in children's medicine.

The hospital works with the UCL Institute of Child Health, and is the largest centre for research into childhood illness outside the United States and Canada, and a major international trainer of medical professionals.

This television series was filmed over the course of a year and features unprecedented access to health professionals as they make some of the hardest choices in medicine. In this series cameras followed Great Ormond Street Hospital's medical professionals into the meetings where they come face to face with the most difficult ethical dilemmas on a daily basis.

== Episodes ==
The first series consisted of three one hour programmes and each episode focussed on a separate department within the hospital. The second series consists of six episodes, also one hour long. Series three (of three episodes) starts on 14 July 2015.

=== Series 1 (2010) ===
No. overall	No. in series	Title	Directed by	Original release date
1	1	"Pushing the Boundaries"	Ricardo Pollack	6 April 2010
The first episode looked at the work of the Cardiac unit.
2	2	"Caught in the Machine"	Ricardo Pollack	13 April 2010
The second episode focused on the work of the intensive care unit.
3	3	"An Imperfect Cure"	Simon Gilchrist	20 April 2010
The final episode follows the work of the renal department.

=== Series 2 (2012) ===
No. overall	No. in series	Title	Directed by	Original release date
4	1	"A Difficult Line"	Shona Thompson	8 May 2012
A look at Great Ormond Street Hospital's oncology department, following doctors as they face challenging ethical decisions about treating children with some of the rarest and most complex cancers in the country.
5	2	"A Chance at Life"	Marina Parker	15 May 2012
An intimate portrait of two surgeons in Great Ormond Street's General Surgery unit.
6	3	"Buying Time"	Rob Gill	22 May 2012
This episode focuses on Great Ormond Street's heart transplant team.
7	4	"A Delicate Balance"	Jonathan Taylor	29 May 2012
This episode follows the intensive care and respiratory doctors at Great Ormond Street Hospital as they deal with difficult ethical decisions.
8	5	"Decisions For Life"	Rob Gill	12 June 2012
This episode looks at the ethical dilemmas faced by the cardiothoracic team at Great Ormond Street Hospital
9	6	"Experimental Surgery"	Simon Gilchrist	19 June 2012
This episode looks at the experimental surgeries being performed at the leading children's hospital.

=== Series 3 (2015) ===
No. overall	No. in series	Title	Directed by	Original release date
10	1	"Fix My Genes"	Catey Sexton	14 July 2015
11	2	"Fight to Breathe"	Catey Sexton	21 July 2015
12	3	"Mend My Brain"	Dollan Cannell	28 July 2015

== Reception ==
Great Ormond Street received positive reviews. Tom Sutcliffe of The Independent wrote that the series was "distinguished by the attention it paid to the limits of medical expertise". Ceri Radford writing for The Daily Telegraph called the series "excellent" and added that "the sensitivity of [the] programme saved it from feeling voyeuristic". John Crace of The Guardian said that the documentary "exposed us to the existential questions that doctors face on a daily basis – and which most documentaries avoid", while Andrew Billen of The Times called it "extraordinarily frank". Jane Simon for The Daily Mirror said that the programme was "made with great sensitivity" and Paul Whitelaw, writing for The Scotsman called the series "A sensitive study of tragedy and hope".
