= Michael Wood (historian) =

English historian and broadcaster (born 1948)

Michael Wood OBE, FSA
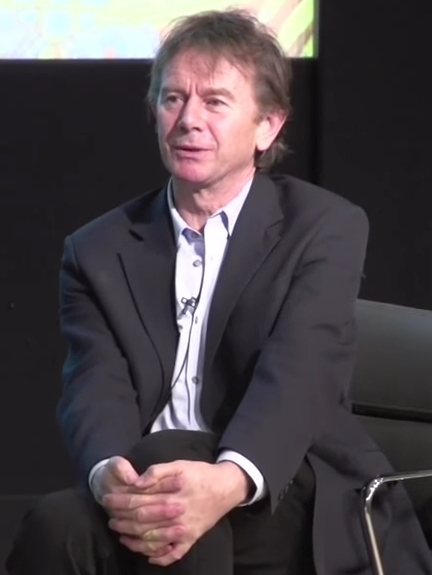
- Wood in 2013
- Born: Michael David Wood; 23 July 1948 (age 78); Moss Side, Manchester, UK
- Education: Manchester Grammar School: Oriel College, University of Oxford (B. A.)
- Occupations: Historian, broadcaster, documentary filmmaker
- Notable work: In Search of the Dark Ages (1979); Great Railway Journeys (1980); In Search of the Trojan War (1985); In the Footsteps of Alexander the Great (1998); The Story of India (2007); In Search of Beowulf (2009); The Story of England (2010); The Story of China (2016)

Michael David Wood (born 23 July 1948) is an English historian and broadcaster. He has presented numerous well-known television documentary series from the late 1970s to the present day. Wood has also written a number of books on history, including In Search of the Dark Ages, The Domesday Quest, The Story of England, The Story of India, The Story of China, and In Search of Shakespeare. His works have included English history, history of various civilizations including the Greek, Chinese and Indian, and others. He has been a Professor of Public History at the University of Manchester since 2013.

== Early life and education ==
Wood was born in Moss Side, Manchester, England. He attended Heald Place Primary School in Rusholme. When he was eight, his family moved to Paulden Avenue, Wythenshawe, where he could see historic Baguley Hall from his bedroom window. He went to Benchill Primary School. At The Manchester Grammar School, he developed an interest in theatre, playing Grusha in the first British amateur production of Bertolt Brecht's The Caucasian Chalk Circle and later Hamlet in Shakespeare's Hamlet. Wood took A-levels in English, French and History.

When studying at the Manchester Grammar School, Wood wrote a letter in response to an article by Montgomery of Alamein about how the Anglo-Saxons had lost in 1066 because they were a backward bunch of pot-bellied drunks. Wood's letter was written as King Harold and explained what had really happened. Montgomery, slightly prickly, wrote to the school saying that he gathered that King Harold was a pupil at the school.

Wood was admitted to Oriel College, Oxford, on a scholarship to read history but switched to English as he felt that the history curriculum at Oriel at that time was rather like doing A-levels again, and he instead wanted to get on to the real sources. Wood graduated with an upper second Bachelor of Arts degree, which he says might well have been his own doing as he had not been to any lectures or tutorials in his penultimate term, partly due to a chance to tour the United States for six weeks with A Midsummer Night's Dream. Later, he undertook postgraduate research in Anglo-Saxon history at Oriel. Three years into his research for a DPhil, he left to become a journalist with ITV.

== Career ==
In the 1970s, Wood worked for the BBC in Manchester. He was first a reporter and then an assistant producer on current affairs programmes before returning to his love of history with his 1979–81 series In Search of the Dark Ages for BBC2, which he presented.

Wood founded an independent television production company Maya Vision International, which has produced more than 120 documentaries that have been shown in more than 140 countries and territories.

Wood has written several books accompanying his television series. In 2006 he joined the British School of Archaeology in Iraq campaign, the aim of which was to train and encourage new Iraqi archaeologists, and he has lectured on the subject. In 2013 Wood joined the University of Manchester as Professor of Public History. He has long been a contributor to BBC History magazine.

== Image ==
Wood, when he started his career as a presenter, quickly became popular with female viewers for his blond good looks, deep voice and habit of wearing tight jeans and a sheepskin jacket. He was humorously dubbed "the thinking woman's crumpet" by British newspapers. He is recognized for effectively blending academic scholarship with accessibility.

== Views ==
Wood has stated that while empires were often built on the power of swords, India alone created an empire of spirit. He introduces India's history and culture in two sweeping sentences as: "Over the next 3,000 years Greeks and Kushans, Turks and Afghans, Mughals and British, Alexander, Tamburlaine and Babur, will all come and fall under India’s spell. And India’s greatest strength, one known only to the oldest civilizations, will be to adapt and change, to use the gifts of history and to accept its wounds, but somehow, magically, to be always India."

Wood favours returning artefacts looted during the age of imperialism. He has publicly supported moving the Elgin Marbles from the British Museum back to Attica.

Wood has termed the destruction in Gaza in the Gaza war more thorough than any ancient siege.

Writing in 2016 for the BBC History magazine, Wood seemed to suggest that he favoured adding a statue of an African hero/heroine in response to a movement asking to remove Oxford's Cecil Rhodes statue at Oriel College.

In 2018, Wood called the UK Home Office's destruction of landing cards of the Windrush generation an "extraordinary act of vandalism."

In 2024, Wood said that with torrent of fake news and imagined histories, it is critical for historians of all persuasions to create good narratives of the past but warns that no definitive story of the past is possible or desirable because the past is always changing.

Wood has described the use of term "golden age" as follows.

"All cultures of course have fixed on the idea of a great past, a golden age. But golden ages are imagined pasts. Real history is more complex, never static, always moving. And creating it in a realistic way for each generation is not just the preserve of politicians and thinkers, or the job of historians, but (and this is even more true in the age of the internet) of all of us. For identity is not a fixed thing, and it never was. It is always in the making, and never made."

== Personal life ==
Wood's girlfriend for ten years, in the late 1970s and early 1980s, was the journalist and broadcaster Pattie Coldwell.

Wood lives in north London with his wife, television producer Rebecca Ysabel Dobbs, with whom he has two daughters. His book A South Indian Journey: The Smile of Murugan was inspired by a temple astrologer who had accurately predicted his marriage and the birth of his two daughters. Both his daughters have Indian names.

Wood credits his family history, specifically his relatives' roles in World War II, for triggering interest in the past:

"My uncle Sid was torpedoed and sunk in the middle of the Mediterranean and swam through burning oil; Dad was in the hospital at Haslar on D-Day looking after the dead and the dying; Mum was caught in the blitz in the middle of Manchester and sheltered in a doorway all night."

He is a vegetarian.

== Honours and recognition ==
Wood has been a Fellow of the Royal Historical Society and Royal Society of the Arts. In 2009, he was awarded an Honorary Doctorate of Arts by Sunderland University. This was followed by an honorary degree of Doctor of Letters by the University of Leicester in 2011 and in 2015 he was awarded the President's Medal by the British Academy. Wood received honorary Doctor of Letters degrees from Lancaster University in 2007 and the University of Winchester in 2021.

Wood is the president of the Society for Anglo-Chinese Understanding. He was elected a Fellow of the Society of Antiquaries in 2008.

Wood was appointed Officer of the Order of the British Empire (OBE) in the 2021 New Year Honours for services to public history and broadcasting. He expressed regret that an opportunity had been missed to replace the word Empire with Excellence in OBE.

BAFTA-winning broadcaster David Olusoga has said that he was inspired as a teenager to become a historian by having watched Wood on television. Historian and broadcaster Lucy Worsley has stated that Wood and his unconventional documentary format inspired her when she was a child.

Wood is a recipient of the Historical Association's Medlicott Medal and has served as a Trustee of Historic Royal Palaces. He has been a governor of the Royal Shakespeare Company and a Trustee of the Shakespeare Birthplace Trust, and is the Honorary President of The Classical Association for the year 2025–26.

The Wall Street Journal has described The Story of India as the "gold standard of documentary history making." The Independent has called The Story of England "the most innovative history series ever made for TV". The Chinese news agency, Xinhua, has said that The Story of China had "transcended the barriers of ethnicity and belief and brought something inexplicably powerful and touching to the TV audience."

== Television series ==
- In Search of the Dark Ages (1979–81)
- Great Railway Journeys ("Zambezi Express", 1980)
- Great Little Railways (episode 3: "Slow Train to Olympia", 1983)
- In Search of the Trojan War (1985)
- Domesday: A Search for the Roots of England (1986)
- Greece: The Hidden War (1986)
- Art of the Western World (1989)
- Legacy: A Search for the Origins of Civilisation (1992)
- Lifeboat (1993)
- In the Footsteps of Alexander the Great (1997)
- Conquistadors (2000)
- In Search of Shakespeare (2003)
- In Search of Myths and Heroes (2005)
- The Story of India (2007)
- Michael Wood's Story of England (2010)
- The Great British Story: A People's History (2012)
- King Alfred and the Anglo Saxons (2013)
- The Story of China (2016)

== Documentaries ==
- Darshan: An Indian Journey (1989)
- Traveller's Tales: The Sacred Way (1991)
- Saddam's Killing Fields (1993)
- Secret History: Hitler's Search for the Holy Grail (1999)
- Gilbert White: Nature Man (2006)
- Christina: A Medieval Life (2008)
- In Search of Beowulf (2009) (a.k.a. Michael Wood on Beowulf)
- Alexander's Greatest Battle (2009)
- Shakespeare's Mother; The Secret Life of a Tudor Woman (2015)
- Ovid: The Poet and the Emperor (2017)
- How China Got Rich (2019)
- Du Fu: China's Greatest Poet (2020)

== Bibliography ==
- In Search of the Dark Ages (BBC Books, 1981)
- In Search of the Trojan War (1985)
- Domesday: A Search for the Roots of England (1988)
- Legacy: A Search for the Origins of Civilization (1992), London: Network Books/BBCbooks/London BCA.
- The Smile of Murugan: A South Indian Journey (1995)
- In the Footsteps of Alexander the Great (1997)
- In Search of England: Journeys into the English Past (1999)
- Conquistadors (2000)
- In Search of Shakespeare (2003)
- In Search of Myths and Heroes (2005)
- India: An Epic Journey Across the Subcontinent (2007)
- The Story of England (2010)
- The Story of China (2020)
- China's Greatest Poet: In the Footsteps of Du Fu (2023)
