= Broadcast (magazine) =

UK TV and radio industry magazine

- Cover of the November 2024 issue
- Editor: Chris Curtis
- Categories: Media and television
- Frequency: Monthly
- Circulation: 6,383 (Jan–Dec 2012)
- Founded: 1973; 53 years ago
- Company: Media Business Insight
- Country: United Kingdom
- Based in: London
- Language: English
- Website: BroadcastNow.co.uk
- OCLC: 1043120303

Broadcast is a monthly magazine for the United Kingdom television and radio industry, owned by Media Business Insight.

== History ==
Broadcast was started in 1973 by Rod Allen, who went on to work at LWT, HTV and HarperCollinsInteractive. He was most recently head of the Department of Journalism at City University, London, until he retired in 2006.

The magazine was later owned by Thomson Information Services, EMAP acquired it in 1993. Ascential later sold the magazine as part of a management buyout of Media Business Insight division in 2015.

== Description ==
The magazine covers a wide range of news and issues affecting the professional broadcast market in the UK. It has regular monthly sections covering news, commissioning, facilities, analysis, opinion, interview, platforms, production and ratings. Broadcast also often has a special feature covering an issue relevant to the industry. It is owned by Media Business Insight, a publishing, events and information business that also includes Screen International.

== Notable former staff ==
- Dan Wootton (former News of the World TV editor)

== Awards ==
Since 1996 the magazine has conferred the annual Broadcast Awards, in a ceremony held at the Grosvenor House Hotel in London, to recognise and reward excellence in and around the UK television programming industry. Additionally, each June since 2005, the magazine has held the annual Broadcast Digital Channel Awards specifically for the digital TV industry, recognising and rewarding innovation, creativity and commercial success.

In 2019 the Broadcast Tech Innovation Awards were instituted to celebrate the exceptional teams behind the most outstanding broadcast productions of the year, and 2021 saw the inaugural Broadcast Sport Awards.

=== Broadcast Awards ===
==== 2024 nominations and winners ====
29th annual awards: 8 February 2024 - Host: Sue Perkins
Best Children's Programme	Best Comedy Programme	Best Current Affairs Programme
A Kind of Spark (BBC); I Am Your Mother (Star Wars: Visions Volume 2) (Disney+); Lloyd of the Flies (CITV); Newsround Special: Ukraine - The Children's Story (BBC); Operation Ouch! Let's Talk About Cancer (CBBC); The Rubbish World of Dave Spud (CITV)	Black Ops (BBC); Changing Ends (ITVX); Dreaming Whilst Black (BBC); Everyone Else Burns (Channel 4); Juice (BBC); The Change (Channel 4)	Russell Brand: In Plain Sight (Channel 4); Inside the Iranian Uprising (BBC); Putin vs The West (BBC); The Crossing (ITV1); Under Poisoned Skies (BBC News Arabic); Undercover Hospital: Patients at Risk (BBC)
Best Daytime Programme	Best Documentary Programme	Best Documentary Series
Scam Interceptors (BBC); Lingo (ITV1); Lorraine: Breast Cancer Special (ITV1); Make It At Market (BBC); Strangers on a Plane (Channel 4); The Finish Line (BBC)	Lyra (Channel 4); London Bridge: Facing Terror (Channel 4); Panorama Mariupol: The People's Story (BBC); Scandalous: Phone Hacking on Trial (BBC); Stranger In My Family (BBC); This World: The Shamima Begum Story (BBC)	Once Upon a Time in Northern Ireland (BBC); Ed Sheeran: The Sum of It All (Disney+); Evacuation (Channel 4); George Michael: Outed (Channel 4); Murder In The Pacific (BBC); Three Mothers, Two Babies, And A Scandal (Amazon Prime Video)
Best Drama Series or Serial	Best Entertainment Programme	Best Multichannel Programme
Happy Valley (BBC and AMC); Blue Lights (BBC); Hijack (Apple TV+); I Hate Suzie Too (Sky Atlantic); The English (BBC); The Sixth Commandment (BBC)	The 1% Club (ITV1); Ant & Dec's Saturday Night Takeaway (ITV1); I'm A Celebrity...Get Me Out of Here! (ITV1); Michael McIntyre's Big Show (BBC); Strictly Come Dancing (BBC); The Traitors (BBC)	I Kissed A Boy (BBC); Married at First Sight UK (E4); Rolf Harris: Hiding in Plain Sight (ITVX); Sexsomnia: Case Closed? (BBC); Spike Milligan: The Unseen Archive (Sky Arts); The Ice Cream Wars (BBC Scotland)
Best Music Programme	Best News Programme	Best Original Programme
Eurovision Song Contest 2023 (BBC); Elton John Live: Farewell from Dodger Stadium (Disney+); Glastonbury 2023 (BBC); One Big Night of Musicals by The National Lottery (BBC); "Sam Smith Live at The Royal Albert Hall" (TikTok); The Coronation Concert (BBC)	ITV News at Ten: The Lucy Letby Verdict (ITV1); BBC News at Ten: Wagner's March on Moscow (BBC); Channel 4 News: Live in Adana (Channel 4); Disaster Zone: The Turkey-Syria Earthquake (Sky News); Good Morning Britain (ITV1); Newsnight: Wagner Coup (BBC)	The Piano (Channel 4); Dreaming Whilst Black (BBC); Gregg Wallace: The British Miracle Meat (Channel 4); How To Survive A Dictator With Munya Chawawa (Channel 4); I Kissed A Boy (BBC); The Traitors (BBC)
Best Popular Factual Programme	Best Pre-School Programme	Best Single Drama
Joe Lycett Vs Beckham, Got Your Back at Xmas (Channel 4); At Home with the Furys (Netflix); Clarkson's Farm (Prime Video); Sort Your Life Out (BBC); The Martin Lewis Money Show Live (ITV1); The Yorkshire Vet (Channel 5)	123 Number Squad! (Sky kids); Pip and Posy (Milkshake! and Sky Kids); Pop Paper City (Milkshake!); Roots & Fruits (CBeebies); The Makery (Sky Kids); What's In Your Bag? (CBeebies)	I Am Ruth (Channel 4); Black Mirror: Demon 79 (Netflix); Consent (Channel 4); Mayflies (BBC); There She Goes - 414 (BBC); Y Sŵn (S4C)
Best Soap/Continuing Drama	Best Specialist Factual Programme	Best Sports Programme
Casualty; Coronation Street; EastEnders; Emmerdale; Hollyoaks; Waterloo Road	Inside Our Autistic Minds (BBC); Anorexic (Channel 5); Head On: Rugby, Dementia and Me (BBC); How The Holocaust Began (BBC); The Holy Land and Us: Our Untold Stories (BBC); Windrush: Portraits of a Generation (BBC)	Monday Night Football (Sky Sports); FA Cup 4th Round: Wrexham v Sheffield United (BBC); FIFA Qatar World Cup 2022 (ITV1); Men's World Cup Final: France v Argentina (BBC); Premier League on Prime: Arsenal v Manchester City (Prime Video); The Ashes (Sky Sports Cricket)
International Programme Sales	Best Post-Production House	Emerging Indie Of The Year
Dreaming Whilst Black; Ancient Egypt By Train; Planet Sex with Cara Delevinge; Rogue Heroes; The Elon Musk Show; Wreck	runVT; dock10; Gorilla Post Production; Halo; Sky Post Production; Splice Post	Curious Films; Mindhouse Productions; Motive Pictures; Wonderhood Studios
Best Independent Production Company	Channel Of The Year	Special Recognition Award
Studio Lambert; Clapperboard Studios; Fulwell 73; Hartswood Films; Optomen Television; Twofour	BBC One; BBC Three; BBC Two; Channel 4; ITV1; Sky News	Martin Lewis

TV Moment of the Year
- Succession (Logan Roy's death)
  - Beckham (David queries Victoria claiming she's from a working-class family)
  - Eurovision Song Contest (Former Eurovision contestants in Liverpool & Ukraine join for a performance of You'll Never Walk Alone)
  - Happy Valley (Catherine caught Clare in a lie)
  - The Bear (S2 takes a stressful family Christmas to the next level)
  - The Piano (Blind & Neurodiverse Lucy stunning commuters in Leeds railway station)

==== 2023 nominations and winners ====
28th annual awards presented: 8 February 2023 – Host: Sue Perkins
Best Children's Programme	Best Comedy Programme	Best Daytime Programme
Robin Robin (Netflix); Efaciwîs (Evacuees) (S4C); FYI Investigates – "Escape From Ukraine" (Sky Kids and Sky News); Gym Stars (CBBC); My Life: Dancing Queen (CBBC); Shaun the Sheep: The Flight Before Christmas (BBC & Netflix)	Derry Girls (Channel 4); Am I Being Unreasonable?; Big Boys; Cheaters; Stath Lets Flats; Wedding Season (Disney+)	Moneybags (Channel 4); Expert Witness (BBC One); Good Morning Britain; Scam Interceptors (BBC One); The Bidding Room (BBC One); The Chase
Best Documentary Programme	Best Documentary Series	Best Drama Series or Serial
The Real Mo Farah (BBC One); Chernobyl: The Lost Tapes (Sky Documentaries); Look Away (Sky Documentaries); Our Falklands War: A Frontline Story (BBC Two) (Note: Highly commended); Rape: Who's on Trial? (Channel 4); The Tinder Swindler (Netflix)	Jimmy Savile: A British Horror Story (Netflix); Big Oil v the World (BBC Two); Curse of the Chippendales (Amazon Prime Video); The Jeremy Kyle Show: Death on Daytime (Channel 4); Scam Land: Money, Mayhem and Maseratis (BBC Three); We Are Black and British (BBC Two)	This is Going to Hurt (BBC and AMC); Bad Sisters (Apple TV+); Landscapers (Sky Atlantic); The Responder; The Thief, His Wife and the Canoe; Top Boy (Netflix)
Best Entertainment Programme	Best Multichannel Programme	Best Music Programme
The 1% Club (ITV1); Big Zuu's Big Eats (Dave); Gogglebox; Life and Rhymes (Sky Arts); Strictly Come Dancing; The Lateish Show with Mo Gilligan	Drych: Fi, Rhyw ac Anabledd (S4C); Big Zuu's Big Eats (Dave); Brickies (BBC Three); Love Island (ITV2); The Hunt for Bible John (BBC Scotland); Ysgol Ni: Y Moelwyn (S4C)	An Audience with Adele (ITV1); BRIT Awards 2022 (ITV1); Charles Hazlewood: Reinventing the Orchestra (Sky Arts); Flackstock (Sky Max and Sky Showcase); Liam Gallagher: 48 Hours at Rockfield (Sky Max, Sky Arts, Now); The Glasgow Mela 2022 (BBC Scotland)
Best News/Current Affairs Programme	Best Original Programme	Best Popular Factual Programme
The Whistleblowers: Inside the UN (BBC Two); Afghanistan: No Country for Women (ITV1); Fearless: The Women Fighting Putin (ITV1); Myanmar: The Forgotten Revolution (Channel 4); Panorama: "SAS Death Squads Exposed: A British War Crime?"; Ukraine: Life Under Attack (Channel 4)	Mood (BBC Three); Am I Being Unreasonable?; Don't Hug Me I'm Scared; Open House: The Great Sex Experiment (Channel 4); Queens of Rap (Channel 4); Then Barbara Met Alan	Olivia Attwood: Getting Filthy Rich (ITV2); 90 Day Fiancé (Discovery+); Freddie Flintoff's Field of Dreams (BBC One); The Martin Lewis Money Show Live; The Apprentice; Trip Hazard
Best Post Production House	Best Pre-School Programme	Best Single Drama
Halo Post; Dock 10; Fifty Fifty; Films at 59; Fitzrovia Post Production; Storm	Lovely Little Farm (Apple TV+); Big Cook, Little Cook; Circle Square (Milkshake!); JoJo & Gran Gran; Odo (Milkshake!); Show Me How (Milkshake!)	Then Barbara Met Alan (BBC Two); Death of England: Face to Face (Sky Arts); Life and Death in the Warehouse; My Name is Leon (BBC Two); On The Edge: Cradled (Channel 4); The House (Netflix)
Best Soap/Continuing Drama	Best Specialist Factual Programme	Best Sports Programme
Emmerdale; Ackley Bridge; Casualty; Coronation Street; EastEnders; Hollyoaks	Worlds Collide: The Manchester Bombing (ITV1); Aids: The Unheard Tapes (BBC Two); Britain's Secret War Babies (Channel 4); Elizabeth: The Unseen Queen; Frozen Planet II; Survivors: Portraits of the Holocaust (BBC Two)	Women's Euro 2022 (BBC Sport); ITV Racing – The Derby Platinum Jubilee Special; NFL Super Bowl Preview Show (BBC); Olympic Winter Games Beijing 2022 (Eurosport 1 and Discovery+); Monday Night Football; The Hundred (Sky Sports Cricket)
International Programme Sales	Emerging Indie of the Year	Best Independent Production Company
The 1% Club; Five Guys A Week; Ridley Road; The Man with a Penis On His Arm; The Responder; The Tourist	Forest; Buzz 16; Honey Bee; Long Story TV; Mam Tor Productions; The Format Factory	Sister; CPL Productions; Dancing Ledge Productions; See-Saw Films; South Shore; Whisper
Channel of the Year	Special Recognition Award	
BBC One; BBC Two; BBC Three; Channel 4; ITV1; Sky News	Huw Edwards	

TV Moment of the Year
- Derry Girls (Erin's monologue in the final episode of the Northern Ireland comedy)
  - Bad Sisters (After weeks of twists and turns, the identity of JP's killer is finally revealed)
  - Doctor Who (Jodie Whittaker unexpectedly regenerates as David Tennant)
  - Euro 2022 final (England forward Chloe Kelly ditches a post-match interview to join her teammates in belting out ’Sweet Caroline’)
  - Love Island (Ekin-Su’s secret kiss with Jay leads to an explosive argument with Davide)
  - Paddington meets The Queen (Her Majesty enjoys tea with Paddington Bear as part of the Platinum Jubilee celebrations)
  - Sunday with Laura Kuenssberg (Comedian Joe Lycett upstages new prime minister Liz Truss)
  - The Tinder Swindler (Con artist Shimon Hayut gets his comeuppance)
  - The Traitors (Tom reveals to the group that fellow contestant Alex is his girlfriend, after discovering she is on trial. Chaos ensues)
  - This is Going To Hurt (Junior doctor Shruti Acharya breaks fourth wall before ending her life)

==== 2022 nominations and winners ====
27th annual awards presented: 10 February 2022 – Host: Alex Horne and The Horne Section
Best Children's Programme	Best Comedy Programme	Best Daytime Programme
My Life: I'm Leading the Dance (CBBC); Almost Never; Dodo (Sky Kids); My Life: Picture Perfect (CBBC); Planet Defenders (CBBC); The Rubbish World of Dave Spud	Alma's Not Normal; Dreaming Whilst Black (BBC Three); Ghosts; Ladybaby (BBC Three); Starstruck; We Are Lady Parts	The Great House Giveaway (Channel 4); Drawers Off (Channel 4); Good Morning Britain; Moving On; Murder, Mystery and My Family; Steph's Packed Lunch
Best Documentary Programme	Best Documentary Series	Best Drama Series or Serial
Finding Jack Charlton; 2020: The Story of Us (ITV); Black Power: A British Story of Resistance; Damilola: The Boy Next Door (Channel 4); Kate Garraway: Finding Derek (ITV); Roman Kemp: Our Silent Emergency (BBC)	9/11: One Day in America; 24 Hours in Police Custody: "Black Widow"; Football's Darkest Secret (BBC One); Liverpool Narcos (Sky Documentaries); The Detectives: Fighting Organised Crime; Uprising	It's a Sin; Manhunt: The Night Stalker; Small Axe; Stephen; The Serpent; Time
Best Entertainment Programme	Best Lockdown Programme	Best Multichannel Programme
Don't Hate The Playaz (ITV2); I'm a Celebrity...Get Me Out of Here!; Strictly Come Dancing; The Masked Singer; The Ranganation; Too Hot to Handle	Surviving Covid (Channel 4); Help (Channel 4); I'm a Celebrity... Get Me Out of Here!; Kate Garraway: Finding Derek (ITV); Pandemic 2020 (BBC Two); Staged	Defending Digga D (BBC); Big Zuu's Big Eats (Dave); Jerk; Meet the Khans: Big in Bolton; Roman Kemp: Our Silent Emergency; The Rap Game UK (BBC)
Best Music Programme	Best News/Current Affairs Programme	Best Original Programme
Charles Hazlewood: Beethoven & Me (Sky); A Day in the Live: Wizkid (YouTube); Michael Kiwanuka & Laura Marling: 6 Music Festival 2021; Sam Smith: Love Goes – Live at Abbey Road Studios (Netflix); The Live Revival (Sky Arts); Tonight with Target (BBC Three)	Storming the Capitol (ITV News); 54 Days: China and the Pandemic (BBC); Hunting the People Smugglers (Exposure); Muslim in Trump's America (Exposure); The Black Maternity Scandal (Dispatches); Undercover in the Schools that Chain Boys	Krept and Konan: We Are England; CripTales (BBC Four); In The Footsteps of Killers (Channel 4); Marina Abramović Takes Over TV (Sky Arts); The Great House Giveaway (Channel 4); Together
Best Popular Factual Programme	Best Post Production House	Best Pre-School Programme
Clarkson's Farm; Celebrity SAS: Who Dares Wins; Joe Lycett's Got Your Back; Long Lost Family: Born Without Trace; The Rap Game UK (BBC); The Surrogates (BBC Three)	Halo Post; Envy; Fifty Fifty; Films at 59; Splice; The Edit	World According to Grandpa (Milkshake!); Go Green with the Grimwades (Milkshake!); Milo (Milkshake!); Numberblocks (CBeebies); Odo (Milkshake!); Pip & Posy (Milkshake!)
Best Single Drama	Best Soap/Continuing Drama	Best Specialist Factual Programme
Help; Boys (Sky Arts); Danny Boy; I Am...: "I Am Victoria"; Roald & Beatrix: The Tail of the Curious Mouse; Romeo & Juliet (Sky Arts)	Casualty; Coronation Street; EastEnders; Emmerdale; Holby City; Hollyoaks	9/11: Inside the President's War Room; Hair Power: Me and My Afro (Channel 4); Horizon Special: The Vaccine; Inside Chernobyl with Ben Fogle; Silenced: The Hidden Story of Disabled Britain (BBC Two); The Surgeon's Cut
Best Sports Programme	International Programme Sales	Emerging Indie of the Year
ITV Racing: 2021 Grand National; European Super League (Sky Sports); Sky Sports The Hundred; The Paralympics (Channel 4); Tokyo 2020 Olympic Games (BBC Sport); UEFA Euro 2020 (ITV Sport)	Alex Rider; Death in Paradise; Inside Chernobyl with Ben Fogle; It's a Sin; Planet Defenders (CBBC)	Flicker Productions; Air TV; Cardiff Productions; Doc Hearts; Licklemor Productions; South Shore
Best Independent Production Company	Channel of the Year	Special Recognition Award
World Productions; 72 Films; Bad Wolf; Hungry Bear Media; Monkey Kingdom; Tuesday's Child	BBC One; BBC Two; Channel 4; Dave; ITV; Sky Arts	David Frank (Founder, RDF Media)

TV Moment of the Year
- Strictly Come Dancing (Rose Ayling-Ellis and Giovanni Pernice dance in silence to raise awareness around the experience of the deaf community)
  - An Audience with Adele (The singing superstar bursts into tears after being surprised by her influential former English teacher)
  - Good Morning Britain (Piers Morgan walks off the set during an on-air clash relating to his comments about Meghan, Duchess of Sussex)
  - I'm a Celebrity...Get Me Out of Here! (Ant & Dec mock Boris Johnson over alleged parties at Number Ten during lockdown)
  - It's a Sin (Colin dies in a hospital bed having told his Mum: “Oh mammy, make them do something – I don't want to die.”)
  - ITV News at Ten (Robert Moore films inside the Capitol in Washington as it is ransacked by Trump supporters)
  - Mare of Easttown (Mare's partner Detective Colin Zabel is killed in a shootout with the serial kidnapper)
  - Squid Game (The 'Red Light, Green Light' challenge quickly reveals to contestants this is no ordinary schoolyard game)
  - The Beatles: Get Back (Paul McCartney casually creates the song Get Back while strumming away on his guitar)
  - US Open Final (British teenager Emma Raducanu is the shock winner as Tim Henman leads the cheering from the sidelines)

==== 2021 nominations and winners ====
26th annual awards presented: 27 May 2021 (live-streamed event) – Host: Claudia Winkleman
Best Children's Programme	Best Comedy Programme	Best Daytime Programme
I Want to Change the World (Film4); FYI Investigates – Brazil: Children Caught in the Crossfire (Sky Kids); Jamie Johnson: "Outside the Box"; Operation Ouch!: "Virus Alert"; Our School; The Rubbish World of Dave Spud	Friday Night Dinner; Feel Good; Ghosts; Inside No. 9; Man Like Mobeen; This Country	Moving On; For Love or Money (BBC One); Jeremy Vine; Murder, Mystery and My Family; Richard Osman's House of Games; The Chase
Best Documentary Programme	Best Documentary Series	Best Drama Series or Serial
For Sama; Belsen: Our Story (BBC Two); Exposure: "In Cold Blood"; Italy's Frontline: A Doctor's Diary (BBC Two); The Talk (Channel 4); Undercover with the Clerics: Iraq's Secret Sex Trade (BBC News Arabic)	Once Upon a Time in Iraq; Crime and Punishment (Channel 4); Don't F**k with Cats: Hunting an Internet Killer; Formula 1: Drive to Survive; Murder Trial: The Disappearance of Margaret Fleming (BBC Two); Putin: A Russian Spy Story (Channel 4)	I May Destroy You; Des; I Hate Suzie; Normal People; Quiz; The End of the F***ing World (series 2)
Best Entertainment Programme	Best Lockdown Programme – Entertainment, Comedy and Scripted	Best Multichannel Programme
RuPaul's Drag Race UK; Hypothetical; I'm a Celebrity...Get Me Out of Here!; Strictly Come Dancing; The Masked Singer; The Wall	The Ranganation; A League of Their Own; Home Alone with Joel Dommett (ITV2); Isolation Stories; Staged; Unsaid Stories (ITV)	RuPaul's Drag Race UK; Big Zuu's Big Eats (Dave); Climategate: Science of a Scandal (BBC); Don't Hate The Playaz (ITV2); Man Like Mobeen; The Young Offenders
Best Lockdown Programme – News, Documentaries and Factual	Best Lockdown Programme – Sport and Live	Best Lockdown Programme – Factual Entertainment, Popular Factual & Kids
Dim Ysgol: Maesincla (S4C); Good Morning Britain; Hospital Special: Fighting COVID-19 (BBC Two); Imagine: "This House is Full of Music"; Old, Alone & Stuck at Home (Channel 4); The Talk (Channel 4)	Last Night of the Proms; Burberry Spring/Summer 2021 Show Experience (YouTube Live); Life Drawing Live!; Radio 2 Live at Home: Pulling off a Festival in a Pandemic; The British Academy Television Awards 2020 (BBC One); VE Day 75: The People's Celebration (BBC)	Springtime on the Farm (Channel 5); Dare Master at Home (CITV); Grayson's Art Club; The Choir: Singing for Britain; The Martin Lewis Money Show Live: Coronavirus Special; The One Show
Best Music Programme	Best News/Current Affairs Programme	Best Original Programme
The Live Lounge; Brian Johnson Meets Dave Grohl (Sky Arts); ENO's Drive & Live: La bohème; The BRIT Awards 2020 (ITV); Tune Stays In (BBC Scotland); VJ Day 75: The Nation's Tribute	Prince Andrew & the Epstein Scandal; 8 Minutes and 46 Seconds: The Killing of George Floyd (Sky News); Coronavirus: Into the Red Zone (Sky News); Deterring Democracy: Trump Data Leak (Channel 4); Dispatches: "Growing Up Poor: Britain's Breadline Kids" (Channel 4); Maids for Sale: Silicon Valley's Online Slave Market (BBC News Arabic)	Your Home Made Perfect (BBC Two); All or Nothing: Tottenham Hotspur; Snackmasters; The British Tribe Next Door (Channel 4); The Great Mountain Sheep Gather (BBC Four); Unsaid Stories (ITV)
Best Popular Factual Programme	Best Post Production House	Best Pre-School Programme
Race Across the World; Five Guys a Week (Channel 4); Harry's Heroes: Euro Having a Laugh; Our Yorkshire Farm; The Great British Bake Off; The Repair Shop	Fifty Fifty; Dock 10; Films at 59; Fitzrovia Post; Halo Post; The Edit	JoJo & Gran Gran: "It's Time To Go To The Hairdresser's"; Let's Go For A Walk: "Wind Sounds and Sandcastles Walk" (CBeebies); Molly and Mack: "The Best Christmas Ever"; The Adventures of Paddington (Nick Jr.); The Snail and the Whale; Waffle the Wonder Dog: "Waffle is a Listening Dog"
Best Single Drama	Best Soap/Continuing Drama	Best Specialist Factual Programme
Elizabeth Is Missing; On The Edge: BBW (Channel 4); Anthony (BBC One); Responsible Child; Sitting in Limbo; The Windermere Children	Coronation Street; Casualty; Emmerdale; Hollyoaks	A House Through Time; 999: Critical Condition (Channel 5); African Renaissance: When Art Meets Power (Channel 4); Imagine: "Lemn Sissay: The Memory of Me"; The Rise of the Murdoch Dynasty; Horizon: "What's the Matter with Tony Slattery?"
Best Sports Programme	International Programme Sales	Emerging Indie of the Year
England v West Indies: Black Lives Matter (Sky Sports Cricket); 2019 Rugby World Cup (ITV Sport); Euro 2020 Qualifier: Bulgaria v England (ITV); Ineos 1:59 Challenge (BBC Red Button); Men's FA Cup Final 2020 – Arsenal v Chelsea (BBC Sport); Monday Night Football (Sky Sports)	The Salisbury Poisonings; All Creatures Great and Small; Gangs of London; Harry & Meghan: An African Journey (ITN); The Mallorca Files; Two Weeks to Live	Label1; Dancing Ledge Productions; Electric Robin; Monster Films; Two Rivers Media
Best Independent Production Company	Channel of the Year	Special Recognition Award
Talkback; 72 Films; Chalkboard TV; Love Productions; Mammoth Screen; Plimsoll Productions	BBC Two; BBC One; BBC Three; Channel Four; Channel 5; ITV	ITN

==== 2020 nominations and winners ====
25th annual awards presented: 5 February 2020 – Host: Harry Hill
Best Children's Programme	Best Comedy Programme	Best Daytime Programme
Leaving Care (CBBC); FYI (Sky News); Horrible Histories; Jamie Johnson: "Phoenix Reunited"; The A List (BBC iPlayer); The Athena (Sky Kids)	Fleabag; Derry Girls; Inside No. 9: Live "Dead Line’"; Mum; Stath Lets Flats; This Time with Alan Partridge	The Repair Shop; Critical Incident (BBC One); Murder, Mystery and My Family; Richard Osman's House of Games; The Chase; The Customer is Always Right (BBC One)
Best Documentary Programme	Best Documentary Series	Best Drama Series or Serial
Three Identical Strangers; Driven: The Billy Monger Story (BBC Three); Drowning in Plastic (BBC One); The Abused (Channel 5); Under the Wire (BBC Four); War in the Blood (BBC Two)	Jade: The Reality Star Who Changed Britain; A Dangerous Dynasty: House of Assad (BBC Two); Arabia with Levison Wood (Discovery Channel); Michael Palin in North Korea; The Great British School Swap (Channel 4); Yorkshire Ripper Files (BBC Four)	The Virtues; A Confession; Chernobyl; Peaky Blinders; The Cry; Top Boy
Best Entertainment Programme	Best Multichannel Programme	Best Music Programme
Love Island; Flirty Dancing; I'm a Celebrity...Get Me Out of Here!; Strictly Come Dancing; Taskmaster; Top Gear	Bros: After the Screaming Stops; Emma Willis: Delivering Babies (W); Glow Up: Britain's Next Make-Up Star; Jesy Nelson: Odd One Out (BBC Three); The Rap Game UK; There She Goes	Jazz 625 Live: For One Night Only (BBC Four); Brian Johnson's a Life on the Road (Sky Arts); Four to the Floor; Stormzy at Glastonbury 2019 (BBC Two); The BRIT Awards 2019 (ITV); The Live Lounge Show
Best News/Current Affairs Programme	Best Original Programme	Best Popular Factual Programme
One Day in Gaza (BBC Two); Al Jazeera Investigations: "How to Sell a Massacre"; Hong Kong Protest Violence (Sky News); The Brexit Storm: Laura Kuenssberg's Inside Story (BBC Two); Panorama: "Undercover Hospital Abuse Scandal"; Undercover: Inside China's Digital Gulag (ITV)	They Shall Not Grow Old; Flirty Dancing; I Am Nicola; Jade: The Reality Star Who Changed Britain (Channel 4); Moon Landing (Channel 4); Race Across the World	Harry's Heroes: The Full English; Long Lost Family; Our Dementia Choir with Vicky McClure (BBC One); SAS: Who Dares Wins; The Big Hospital Experiment (BBC Two); The Misadventures of Romesh Ranganathan
Best Post Production House	Best Pre-School Programme	Best Single Drama
Dock10; Envy; Films at 59; Halo Post; Molinare TV & Film; Splice	Andy's Safari Adventures (CBeebies); Becca's Bunch: "The Great Indoors"; Junk Rescue (CBeebies); Molly and Mack; Shane the Chef (Channel 5); Zog (BBC One)	Brexit: The Uncivil War; 8 Days: To the Moon and Back (BBC Two); Black Mirror: Bandersnatch; Doing Money; I Am Kirsty; The Left Behind (BBC Three)
Best Soap/Continuing Drama	Best Specialist Factual Programm	Best Sports Programme
Hollyoaks; Casualty; Coronation Street; EastEnders; Emmerdale; Holby City	The Interrogation of Tony Martin (Channel 4); 100 Vaginas (Channel 4); Jade: The Reality Star Who Changed Britain (Channel 4); Our Planet; Surgeons: At the Edge of Life (BBC Two); The Planets	ICC Cricket World Cup Final 2019 (Sky Sports); 6 Nations Rugby: England v Scotland (ITV Sport); A View from the Terrace; Cheltenham Festival (ITV Racing); The Ashes (Sky Sports); The NFL Show
International Programme Sales	Best Independent Production Company	Channel of the Year
Years and Years; Borderforce USA: The Bridges (Dave); Butterfly; Ex on the Beach; Expedition with Steve Backshall; Patrick Melrose	Studio Lambert; 72 Films; Firecracker; Fulwell 73; Rumpus Media; Sister	Channel 5; BBC One; BBC Two; Channel 4; ITV; Sky Atlantic

Special Recognition Award
- Winner: Kay Mellor
TV Moment of the Year
- Winner: Chernobyl (Tense countdown as conscripts have 90 seconds to throw radioactive granite into the reactor's core)
  - Bros: After the Screaming Stops (Luke and Matt Goss debate the danger of conkers)
  - Fleabag (Fleabag and the ‘hot priest’ get up close and personal in the confession box)
  - Leaving Neverland (Abuse victim James Safechuck reveals the ‘engagement ring’ Michael Jackson bought him for a mock wedding)
  - Line of Duty (DCS Carmichael puts Ted through the wringer about his murky past in a lengthy grilling in the interrogation room)
  - Lorraine (‘What's the point of that?’: Lorraine Kelly lashes out at Jennifer Arcuri)
  - Love Island (‘I was coming back to tell you that I love you’: Amy's heartbreak as Curtis confesses his feelings for Jourdan)
  - Newsnight Special: "Prince Andrew & the Epstein Scandal" (Prince Andrew reveals an unlikely alibi location: Pizza Express in Woking)
  - Succession (‘L to the OG’: Kendall becomes KenWA as he delivers a rap)
  - This Time with Alan Partridge (Alan Partridge meets his Irish doppelganger... who proceeds to sing a rousing rebel song)
  - The Virtues (Joseph confronts his abuser)
  - Years and Years (“It's our fault. This is the world we built”: Muriel Deacon delivers a bleak but powerful monologue that spawns a hundred protest banners)

==== 2019 nominations and winners ====
24th annual awards presented: 6 February 2019 – Host: Harry Hill
Best Children's Programme	Best Comedy Programme	Best Daytime Programme
My Life: Locked in Boy (CBBC); Deadly Dinosaurs; Free Rein – series 2; Horrible Histories – series 7; Jamie Johnson; Last Commanders (CBBC)	Derry Girls; Detectorists; Mum; Stath Lets Flats; This Country; The Windsors: "Royal Wedding Special"	Murder, Mystery and My Family; Buy It Now (Channel 4); Escape to the Chateau DIY; Moving On: "Invisible"; Richard Osman's House of Games; Shakespeare & Hathaway: Private Investigators
Best Documentary Programme	Best Documentary Series	Best Drama Series or Serial
Dispatches: "The Fight for Mosul"; The Bulger Killers: Was Justice Done?(Channel 4); The Funeral Murders (BBC Two); Grenfell (BBC One); Manchester Bomb: Our Story (BBC Three); My Dad, the Peace Deal and Me (BBC One)	Prison (Channel 4); 24 Hours in Police Custody – series 6; Drugsland (BBC Three); Hospital – series 3 (BBC Two); Life and Death Row; The Detectives: Murder on the Streets	A Very English Scandal; Bodyguard; Kiri; Patrick Melrose; Save Me; The End of the F***ing World
Best Entertainment Programme	Best Multichannel Programme	Best Music Programme
Ant & Dec's Saturday Night Takeaway (series 15); Celebrity Hunted; Love Island (series 4); Strictly Come Dancing (series 15); Taskmaster (series 7); The Big Narstie Show	Killed by My Debt; Drugsland (BBC Three); Love Island (series 4); Taskmaster (series 7); This Country; Valley Cops (BBC Three)	Later... with Jools Holland: Later 25; Arctic Monkeys: Live at the BBC; BBC Biggest Weekend; ELO: Wembley or Bust (BBC Two); Isle of Wight Festival 2018 (Sky One); Sounds Like Friday Night
Best News/Current Affairs Programme	Best Original Programme	Best Popular Factual Programme
Channel 4 News: "Cambridge Analytica Uncovered"; Al Jazeera Investigations: "Football's Wall of Silence"; Dispatches: "Myanmar's Killing Fields"; Massacre at Ballymurphy (Channel 4); Rohingya Crisis: Journey into Rakhine State (Sky News); Stacey Dooley: Face to Face with ISIS	Married to a Paedophile (Channel 4); Men Who Sleep in Cars (BBC Four); Mortimer & Whitehouse: Gone Fishing; Peng Life (Channel 4); The Big Narstie Show; The Mighty Redcar	The Real Full Monty: Ladies Night; Celebrity Hunted; Gogglebox – series 11; The £1 Houses: Britain's Cheapest Street (Channel 4); The Misadventures of Romesh Ranganathan; The Repair Shop
Best Post Production House	Best Pre-School Programme	Best Single Drama
Halo Post; Dock10; Encore; Fifty Fifty; Films at 59; Molinare	Pablo; Claude (Disney Junior); Becca's Bunch; Deian a Loli (S4C); School of Roars; Waffle the Wonder Dog	Killed by My Debt; Black Mirror: "USS Callister"; Eric, Ernie and Me; The Boy with the Topknot; The Child in Time; The Miniaturist
Best Soap/Continuing Drama	Best Specialist Factual Programm	Best Sports Programme
Coronation Street; Casualty; EastEnders; Emmerdale; Holby City; Hollyoaks	The Football Club: Artist in Residence (Channel 4); Basquiat: Rage to Riches; Blue Planet II; Grayson Perry: Rites of Passage; Heart Transplant: A Chance to Live (BBC Two); My Dad, the Peace Deal and Me (BBC One)	2018 FIFA World Cup (BBC Sport); England Test Cricket – Cook's Farewell (Sky Sports); Formula 1 2018 (Channel 4); The NFL Show; Six Nations – Scotland v England (BBC Sport ); Super Sunday
International Programme Sales	Best Independent Production Company	Channel of the Year
All Together Now; Abandoned Engineering (Yesterday); Britannia; Catastrophe; Gunpowder; Liar	World Productions; CPL Productions; The Forge; Fulwell 73; Sid Gentle Films; Spun Gold	ITV; BBC One; BBC Two; BBC Three; Channel 4; Channel 5

Special Recognition Award
- Winner: Sir Trevor Mcdonald
TV Moment of the Year

Winner: Killing Eve (Villanelle breaks into Eve's kitchen)

- Nominations: Bodyguard (David Budd talks down a suicide bomber on a train)
- Taskmaster (In the ‘creepiest thing’ prize task, Rhod Gilbert hides in Greg Davies' wardrobe and spies on him while he sleeps)
- Inside No. 9 (live episode repeatedly breaks down as ghosts take over)
- Would I Lie to You (Bob Mortimer convinces David Mitchell that Chris Rea taught him to crack an egg in the bath)
- 24 Hours in Police Custody (Corrupt copper is handcuffed)
- Carpool Karaoke (Paul McCartney surprises Liverpool pub with a live gig)
- Michael Palin in North Korea (Palin wakes to the public broadcast of ‘Brian Eno-esque’ music across the city)
- Love Island (Dani Dyer is shown video of her boyfriend with his ex)
- Dynasties (Penguins get stuck in an ice ravine)

==== 2018 nominations and winners ====
23rd annual awards presented: 7 February 2018 – Host: Jonathan Ross
Best Children's Programme	Best Comedy Programme	Best Daytime Programme
Horrible Histories: "Monstrous musicians"; Danger Mouse; Free Rein; My Life: New Boys in Town (CBBC); Revolting Rhymes; The Zoo	Catastrophe; Cunk on Christmas (BBC); Harry Hill's Alien Fun Capsule; People Just Do Nothing; Peter Kay's Car Share; Revolting	Extreme Cakemakers (Channel 4); Ill Gotten Gains (BBC One); Pointless; Richard Osman's House of Games; The Secret Life of the Hospital Bed (BBC One); Streetmate
Best Documentary Programme	Best Documentary Series	Best Drama Series or Serial
Rio Ferdinand: Being Mum & Dad (BBC One); The Drug Trial: Emergency at The Hospital (BBC Two); Horizon: "Antarctica – Ice Station Rescue"; The Secret Life of Prisons (Channel 4); Slum Britain: 50 Years On (Channel 5); Storyville: "Last Days of Solitary"	Planet Earth II; American High School: Straight Outta Orangeburg (BBC Three); Catching a Killer; Hospital (BBC Two); Kids on The Edge (Channel 4); The Last Miners (BBC One)	Three Girls; Apple Tree Yard; The Crown; Little Boy Blue; National Treasure; Tin Star
Best Entertainment Programme	Best Multichannel Programme	Best Music Programme
Taskmaster; All Round to Mrs. Brown's; I'm a Celebrity...Get Me Out of Here!; Love Island; Strictly Come Dancing; The Voice UK	Love Island; Chewing Gum; Hate Thy Neighbour (Viceland UK); Murdered for Being Different; Taskmaster; This Country	Four to the Floor; Aberfan: Cantata Memoria (S4C); The BRIT Awards (ITV); Glastonbury Festival 2017 (BBC Two); Harry Styles: Behind the Album (Apple TV+); The Rolling Stones – Olé Olé Olé: A Trip Across Latin America
Best News/Current Affairs Programme	Best Original Programme	Best Popular Factual Programme
Jo Cox: Death of an MP (BBC Two); The Forgotten Children (ITV); Panorama: "London Tower Fire: Britain's Shame"; Ross Kemp: "Libya's Migrant Hell"; Stacey Dooley Investigates: "Mums Selling Their Kids for Sex" (BBC Three); Wasting Away: The Truth About Anorexia (Channel 4)	Old People's Home for 4 Year Olds (Channel 4); The Accused (Channel 5); Mutiny (Channel 4); The Real Full Monty (ITV); The Trial: A Murder in the Family; This Time Next Year	Who Do You Think You Are? "Danny Dyer"; Muslims Like Us (BBC Two); Mutiny (Channel 4); Rich House Poor House; Spy in the Wild; The Real Full Monty (ITV)
Best Post Production House	Best Pre-School Programme	Best Single Drama
Films at 59; Dock10; Envy; Halo Post Production; Molinare TV & Film; Technicolor	Apple Tree House; Do You Know?; Get Well Soon Hospital (CBeebies); Go Jetters Christmas Special: "The North Pole"; Lily's Driftwood Bay; School of Roars	Black Mirror: "San Junipero"; Against the Law (BBC Two); Damilola, Our Loved Boy; Murdered for Being Different; NW (BBC Two); To Walk Invisible
Best Soap/Continuing Drama	Best Sports Programme	International Programme Sales
Hollyoaks; Casualty; Coronation Street; EastEnders; Emmerdale; Holby City	Anthony Joshua vs. Wladimir Klitschko (Sky Sports Box Office); Abu Dhabi Grand Prix (Sky Sports F1); Monday Night Football (Sky Sports); The Lions Tour (Sky Sports); The NFL Show; UEFA Women's Euro (Channel 4)	This Time Next Year; Diana, Our Mother: Her Life and Legacy; The Lie Detective (Channel 4); National Treasure; Nightmare on Everest; Riviera
Best Independent Production Company	Channel of the Year	Special Recognition Award
Left Bank Pictures; Kudos; Love Productions; Two Brothers Pictures; Twofour; Wall to Wall	BBC One; BBC Two; Channel 4; Channel 5; ITV1; ITV2	Sir David Attenborough

TV Moment of the Year

Winner: BBC World News (Professor Robert Kelly’s live interview is gatecrashed by his kids)

- Nominations: The Blue Planet II (The phenomenon of transgender fish is revealed)
- Doctor Who (Jodie Whittaker revealed as the first female doctor)
- Game of Thrones (Drogon roasts the Lannister army)
- Gone to Pot – ITV (Christopher Biggins pulls a whitey)
- Have I Got News for You (Jo Brand puts male panellists in their place)
- ITV News: Election Night (George Osborne and Ed Balls revel in Theresa May's election catastrophe)
- Love Island (Amber's face is a picture when new girl Georgia picks Kem)
- Rich House Poor House (AJ is gifted boots that will let him play football)
- Taskmaster (song from the final: ‘Rosalind's a fucking nightmare’)

==== 2017 nominations and winners ====
22nd annual awards presented: 01 February 2017 – Host: Jonathan Ross
Best Children's Programme	Best Comedy Programme	Best Daytime Programme
My Life: The Boy on the Bicycle (CBBC); Bear Grylls Survival School (CITV); Hetty Feather; Horrible Histories: "Sensational Shakespeare"; My Life: Marvellous Messy Minds (CBBC); Operation Ouch!	Mum; Camping; Catastrophe; Chewing Gum; Fleabag; Murder in Successville	The Question Jury; Loose Women Special: Sir Cliff Richard, Out of the Shadows; Money for Nothing; A New Life in the Sun (Channel 4); Pick Me!; Sister Rita to the Rescue (BBC One)
Best Documentary Programme	Best Documentary Series	Best Drama Series or Serial
Interview with a Murderer (Channel 4); Abused: The Untold Story (BBC One); Behind Closed Doors (BBC One); How to Die: Simon's Choice (BBC Two); The Murder of Sadie Hartley (ITV); Swim the Channel (BBC Four)	Exodus: Our Journey into Europe (BBC Two); 24 Hours in Police Custody; Grayson Perry: All Man; The Hunt; Killer Women with Piers Morgan; Ross Kemp's Britain (Sky One)	This Is England '90; Cold Feet; The Durrells; Happy Valley; Line of Duty; The Secret
Best Entertainment Programme	Best Multichannel Programme	Best Music Programme
The Last Leg; Britain's Got Talent; Lip Sync Battle UK; Love Island; Strictly Come Dancing; Taskmaster	Fleabag; Charlie Hebdo: 3 Days That Shook Paris (More 4); Chewing Gum; Love Island; Murdered by My Father; Professor Green: Suicide and Me (BBC Three)	Adele at the BBC; The BRIT Awards (ITV); Ed Sheeran: Jumpers for Goalposts Live at Wembley Stadium (Sky Arts); Lenny Kravitz: Just Let Go (Amazon Prime); TFI Friday; Wagner's Ring Cycle (Sky Arts)
Best News/Current Affairs Programme	Best Original Programme	Best Popular Factual Programme
Three Days of Terror: The Charlie Hebdo Attacks (BBC Two); BBC News at Ten: "Hillsborough Inquest"; Children on the Frontline: The Escape (Channel 4); Inside Obama's White House: Obamacare (BBC Two); The Jihadis Next Door (Channel 4); Ross Kemp: The Fight Against ISIS	Fleabag; Computer Says Show (Sky Arts); Dickensian; Flowers; Is This Rape?: Sex on Trial; Naked Attraction	The Real Marigold Hotel; Employable Me (BBC Two); GPs: Behind Closed Doors (Channel 5); SAS: Who Dares Wins; The Secret Life of 4, 5 and 6 Year Olds (Channel 4); The Island with Bear Grylls
Best Post Production House	Best Pre-School Programme	Best Single Drama
Envy; Dock10; Encore; Films at 59; Halo Post; Molinare TV & Film	Topsy and Tim: "Lovely Mossy"; CBeebies A Midsummer Night's Dream; Andy's Prehistoric Adventures; Footy Pups (CBeebies); Jamillah and Aladdin (CBeebies); Lily's Driftwood Bay	Ellen (Channel 4); A Midsummer Night's Dream; Reg; Sherlock: "The Abominable Bride"; The Go-Between; The Watchman (Channel 4)
Best Soap/Continuing Drama	Best Sports Programme	International Programme Sales
Emmerdale; Casualty; Coronation Street; EastEnders; Holby City; Hollyoaks	Rio 2016 Paralympic Games (Channel 4); 2015 Rugby World Cup: South Africa v Japan (ITV Sport); The Grand National 2016 (Channel 4); Isle of Man TT (ITV4); Rio 2016 Summer Olympics (BBC Sport); United States Grand Prix (Sky Sports F1)	The Last Panthers; Impossible Engineering; Keeping the Nation Alive (ITV); Simply Nigella; Versailles; Victoria
Best Independent Production Company	Channel of the Year	Special Recognition Award
Big Talk Productions; ITN Productions; RDF Television; Sid Gentle Films; Studio Lambert; Twofour	Channel 4; BBC One; BBC Two; BBC Three; Dave; Sky One	Later... with Jools Holland

TV Moment of the Year

Winner: Planet Earth II (Racer Snakes vs. Iguanas)

- Nominations: Catastrophe (Paris trip goes wrong)
- Cold Feet (Pete gets drumming)
- Exodus – BBC Two (Aboard the packed dinghy from Turkey to Greece)
- Fleabag (A naked knife-wielding shower surprise)
- Line of Duty (Lindsay Denton's back)
- Louis Theroux: Drinking to Oblivion (Louis hugs Joe who is on point of breakdown)
- Strictly Come Dancing (Ed Balls’ Gangnam Style)
- The Last Leg (Alex Brooker on why Alex Zanardi is his hero)
- The Secret Life of 4, 5 and 6 Year Olds (Cake impossible to resist)

==== 2016 nominations and winners ====
21st annual awards presented: 10 February 2016 – Host: Jonathan Ross
Best Children's Programme	Best Comedy Programme	Best Daytime Programme
So Awkward; Eve; Horrible Histories Special: Awesome Alfred the Great; I am Leo (CBBC); My Life: Mr Alzheimers and Me (CBBC); Punk Chef: Kids Challenge (Community Channel)	Catastrophe; Peter Kay's Car Share; Detectorists; Inside No. 9; The Keith Lemon Sketch Show; People Just Do Nothing	The People Remember (BBC One); Blitz Cities – Liverpool (BBC One); The Chase; Judge Rinder; Posh Pawnbrokers; Who's Doing the Dishes?
Best Documentary Programme	Best Documentary Series	Best Drama Series or Serial
The Paedophile Hunter (Channel 4); Breaking into Britain - The Lorry Jumpers (Channel 4); Citizenfour; Filming My Father: In Life and Death (Channel 5); Storyville: "India's Daughter"; Tales of the Grim Sleeper	The Romanians are Coming (Channel 4); 24 Hours in Police Custody; Dementiaville (Channel 4); Hunters of the South Seas (BBC Two); The Detectives; The Tribe	Doctor Foster; Humans; The Missing; No Offence; Poldark; Wolf Hall
Best Entertainment Programme	Best Multichannel Programme	Best Music Programme
Britain's Got Talent; A League of Their Own; Alan Davies: As Yet Untitled; Release the Hounds; Taskmaster; You're Back in the Room	Reggie Yates' Extreme Russia (BBC Three)'; Detectorists; The Enfield Haunting; Plebs; General Election Night Coverage (Sky Arts); The Unbreakables: Life and Love on Disability Campus (BBC Three)	Four to the Floor; The BRIT Awards 2015 (ITV); Ed Sheeran: Storytellers Live (VH1); Glastonbury 2015 (BBC Two); Ten Pieces; VE Day 70: A Party to Remember (BBC One)
Best News/Current Affairs Programme	Best Original Programme	Best Popular Factual Programme
Dispatches: "Escape from ISIS"; Al Jazeera Investigates: "Inside Kenya's Death Squads"; BBC News at Ten: "Tunisia Terror Attack"; Dispatches: "Kids in Crisis"; Panorama: "To Walk Again"; Sky News: "Tunisia Terror Attack"	Peter Kay's Car Share; Ballot Monkeys; CyberBully; Murder in Successville; No Offence; The Tribe	The Secret Life of 4 Year Olds (Channel 4); Back in Time for Dinner; The Great British Bake Off; The Island with Bear Grylls; Top Gear; Walking the Nile (Channel 4)
Best Post Production House	Best Pre-School Programme	Best Single Drama
Halo Post Production; Encore; Envy; Flix Facilities; Molinare; Technicolor	Clangers; Bing; Rastamouse; Teacup Travels; Toot the Tiny Tugboat; Topsy and Tim	Marvellous; An Inspector Calls; Black Mirror: "White Christmas"; Cyberbully; Danny and the Human Zoo; The Lost Honour of Christopher Jefferies
Best Soap/Continuing Drama	Best Sports Programme	International Programme Sales
Emmerdale; Casualty; Coronation Street; EastEnders; Holby City; Hollyoaks	The 2015 Ashes (Sky Sports); The Derby (Channel 4); European Rugby Champions Cup Final (BT Sport); Isle of Man TT (ITV4); The 2014 Ryder Cup (Sky Sports); NFL Super Bowl (Channel 4)	Fortitude; Downton Abbey; Homes by The Sea; Poldark; The Missing; Wolf Hall
Best Independent Production Company	Channel of the Year	Special Recognition Award
Tiger Aspect Productions; Endor Productions; The Garden Productions; ITN Productions; Kudos Film and Television; Twofour	Channel 4; BBC One; BBC Two; Channel 5; Dave; ITV	Have I Got News for You

TV Moment of the Year

Winner: Japan v South Africa, Rugby World Cup – ITV Sport (Japan's last minute try defeats South Africa)

- Nominations: 24 Hours in Police Custody ("No comment" murder interview)
- Peter Kay's Car Share (Peter Kay sprayed with urine sample)
- Catastrophe (Sharon tells Rob she's pregnant)
- Doctor Foster (The dinner party reveal)
- Downton Abbey (Lord Grantham's bloody collapse)
- Game of Thrones (Jon Snow is dead – or is he?)
- General Election coverage – BBC News (Paddy Ashdown will eat his hat if exit poll is correct)
- The Great British Bake Off (Nadiya's winning speech) Wolf Hall (Anne Boleyn is for the chop)

==== 2015 nominations and winners ====
20th annual awards presented: 4 February 2015 – Host: David Walliams
Best Children's Programme	Best Comedy Programme	Best Daytime Programme
Operation Ouch! Goes Back in Time; Gangsta Granny; Katie Morag; My Life: Signing Off (CBBC); Our School; Strange Hill High	Harry and Paul's Story of the Twos; Him & Her: The Wedding; Rev. (series 3); The Wrong Mans; Toast of London; Uncle	Couples Come Dine with Me; A Taste of Britain (BBC One); Coach Trip; Father Brown (series 2); The Chase; The Sheriffs Are Coming
Best Documentary Programme	Best Documentary Series	Best Drama Series or Serial
Storyville: Pussy Riot - A Punk Prayer; Fabulous Fashionistas (Channel 4); Finding Mum and Dad (Channel 4); Growing Up Down's (BBC Three); The Act of Killing; The Cruel Cut (Channel 4)	Bedlam; Benefits Street; Life and Death Row; Long Lost Family; My Last Summer (Channel 4); Protecting our Parents (BBC Two)	Happy Valley; Line of Duty (series 2); Penny Dreadful; Sherlock; The Honourable Woman; Y Gwyll / Hinterland
Best Entertainment Programme	Best Multichannel Programme	Best Music Programme
Ant & Dec's Saturday Night Takeaway; 8 Out of 10 Cats Does Countdown; A League of Their Own (series 8); I'm a Celebrity...Get Me Out of Here!; The Graham Norton Show; The Last Leg	Uncle; Drifters; Glue; Him & Her: The Wedding; Mr. Sloane; My Mad Fat Diary	Coldplay: Ghost Stories (Sky Arts); BBC Young Musician 2014: The Final; Gary Barlow: Journey to Afghanistan (ITV); Glastonbury 2014: Dolly Parton (BBC Two); Our Gay Wedding: The Musical (Channel 4); The Rolling Stones: Sweet Summer Sun – Hyde Park Live (BBC One)
Best News/Current Affairs Programme	Best Original Programme	Best Popular Factual Programme
Dispatches: "Nigeria's Hidden War"; Breadline Kids (Channel 4); Dispatches: "Children on the Frontline"; Exposure: "Fashion Factories Undercover"; Israel–Gaza: War Without End (Channel 4); Pakistan's Hidden Shame (Channel 4)	Glasgow Girls (BBC Three); Crackanory; Inside No. 9; Release the Hounds; Suspects; The Island with Bear Grylls	The Great British Bake Off; Child Genius; Gogglebox; Karl Pilkington: The Moaning of Life; Pound Shop Wars; The Island with Bear Grylls
Best Post Production House	Best Pre-School Programme	Best Single Drama
Envy Post Production; Clear Cut Pictures; Films at 59; Halo Post Production; Molinare; Technicolor Creative Services	Lily's Driftwood Bay; Andy's Dinosaur Adventures; Dinopaws (CBeebies); Minibeast Adventure with Jess; Swashbuckle; Topsy and Tim	Common; A Poet in New York; An Adventure in Space and Time; Babylon; Murdered by My Boyfriend; The Great Train Robbery
Best Soap/Continuing Drama	Best Sports Programme	International Programme Sales
EastEnders; Casualty; Coronation Street; Emmerdale; Holby City; Hollyoaks	The Grand National 2014 (Channel 4); FA Cup semi-final: Hull City v Sheffield United (BT Sport); Isle of Man TT (ITV4); MOTD Live: Brazil v Germany; Rugby Tonight (BT Sport); The Open 2014 (BBC Sport)	The X Factor; Hinterland / Y Gwyll; Doctor Who 50th anniversary special: "The Day of the Doctor"; Downton Abbey; Line of Duty; MasterChef
Best Independent Production Company	Channel of the Year	Special Recognition Award
Love Productions; Big Talk Productions; Red Production Company; Screenchannel Television; Tiger Aspect Productions; World Productions	BBC One; BBC Three; Channel 4; Dave; E4; ITV; Sky Atlantic	Match of the Day

Best Broadcast Award-winning programme of the past 20 years

Winner: The Office (Best Comedy Programme – 2003)

- Nominations: Big Brother (Best New Programme – 2001)
- Brass Eye Special (Best Comedy Programme – 2003)
- Broadchurch (Best Drama Series – 2014)
- Educating Yorkshire (Best Documentary Series – 2014)
- Gavin & Stacey (Best Comedy Programme – 2009)
- I'm Alan Partridge (Best Comedy Programme – 1999)
- Life on Mars (Best Original Programme – 2007)
- Man on Wire (Best Documentary Programme – 2010)
- Who Do You Think You Are? (Best Popular Factual Programme – 2006)

==== 2014 nominations and winners ====
19th annual awards presented: 5 February 2014 – Host: Alexander Armstrong
Best Children's Programme	Best Comedy Programme	Best Daytime Programme
Mr Stink; Operation Ouch!; Room on the Broom; Strange Hill High; The Snowman and the Snowdog; Wolfblood	A Touch of Cloth (series 2); Chickens; Derek; Playhouse Presents... "Psychobitches"; Plebs; Some Girls	The Sheriffs Are Coming; Country Show Cook Off (BBC Two); Father Brown; Jamie's 15-Minute Meals; Moving On; Operation Hospital Food with James Martin (BBC One); Pointless
Best Documentary Programme	Best Documentary Series	Best Drama Series or Serial
The Murder Trial (Channel 4); Cutting Edge: "The Murder Workers"; Richard III: The King in the Car Park (Channel 4); The Plane Crash (Channel 4); The Unspeakable Crime: Rape (BBC One); True Stories: Dogging Tales (Channel 4)	Educating Yorkshire; Africa; Close Up (BBC Arabic); How to Get a Council House; Inside Claridge's; The Iraq War (BBC Two)	Broadchurch; The Fall; In the Flesh; Last Tango in Halifax; Top of the Lake
Best Entertainment Programme	Best Multichannel Programme	Best Music Programme
Ant & Dec's Saturday Night Takeaway; A League of Their Own; Strictly Come Dancing; The Big Reunion; The Graham Norton Show; Through the Keyhole	A Young Doctor's Notebook; Bradley Wiggins – A Year in Yellow (Sky Atlantic); Edwardian Insects on Film (BBC Four); Plebs; The Call Centre; Youngers	Glastonbury 2013 (BBC); Barclaycard Mercury Prize Sessions (Channel 4); Bollywood Carmen: Live (BBC Three); Later... with Jools Holland; Songs of Praise: "The Coastal Path of Wales"; The Big Dirty List Show: 50 Years of Sex and Music (Channel 4)
Best News/Current Affairs Programme	Best Original Programme	Best Popular Factual Programme
Dispatches: "Syria – Across The Lines"; Exposure: The Other Side of Jimmy Savile (ITV); Panorama: "Hillsborough - How They Buried the Truth"; Dispatches: "The Hunt for Britain's Sex Gangs"; ITV News at Ten; Dispatches: "Plebs, Lies And Videotape"	Gogglebox; Insect Dissection: How Insects Work (BBC Four); The Last Leg; The Plane Crash (Channel 4); Playhouse Presents... "Psychobitches"; Plebs	Gogglebox; First Dates; The Great British Bake Off; Long Lost Family; Naked and Marooned with Ed Stafford; Paul O'Grady: For the Love of Dogs
Best Post Production House	Best Pre-School Programme	Best Single Drama
Halo Post Production; Clear Cut Pictures; Encore; Envy Post Production; Films at 59; Splice TV	Rastamouse; Henry Hugglemonster; Magic Hands (CBeebies); Mike the Knight and the Sneezing Reindeer; Old Jack's Boat: "The Pearl Earring"; Toby's Travelling Circus (Milkshake!)	The Girl; Black Mirror: "Be Right Back"; Burton & Taylor; The Challenger; Mary and Martha; Our Girl
Best Soap/Continuing Drama	Best Sports Programme	International Programme Sales
Coronation Street; Casualty: "Unsilenced"; EastEnders; Emmerdale Live; Holby City: "Great Expectations"; Hollyoaks	The 2012 Ryder Cup (Sky Sports); Isle of Man TT Races (ITV4); Royal Ascot Day 3 (Channel 4); BBC Sports Personality of the Year; The Grand National (Channel 4); Wimbledon Men's Final: Murray v Djokovic (BBC Sport)	Broadchurch; Born to Kill?; Dangerman: The Incredible Mr. Goodwin (Watch); Doctor Who; The Great British Bake Off; Mr Selfridge
Best Independent Production Company	Channel of the Year	Special Recognition Award
Twofour; Big Talk Productions; ITN Productions; Kudos Film & TV; Mentorn Media; Wall to Wall	ITV; BBC One; BBC Two; BBC Three; Channel 4; Sky One	

==== 2013 nominations and winners ====
18th annual awards presented: 30 January 2013 – Host: Rob Brydon
Best Children's Programme	Best Comedy Programme	Best Daytime Programme
Newsround: "Autism and Me"; The Gruffalo's Child; Horrible Histories; Incredible Edibles; Lost Christmas; Postcode (CBBC)	Cardinal Burns; Fresh Meat; Hunderby; Mrs. Brown's Boys; Rev.; Twenty Twelve	The Chase; Antiques Road Trip; Loose Women; Moving On; Phil Spencer: Secret Agent; Secret Dealers
Best Documentary Programme	Best Documentary Series	Best Drama Series or Serial
7/7 One Day in London (BBC Two); Elizabeth Taylor - Auction of a Lifetime; Cutting Edge: "Lifers"; Mummifying Alan: Egypt's Last Secret; Nina Conti – A Ventriloquist's Story: Her Master's Voice; Proud and Prejudiced (Channel 4)	Educating Essex; 24 Hours in A&E; Frozen Planet; Our War (BBC); The Secret History of Our Streets; The Tube	Top Boy; Call the Midwife; Line of Duty; Parade's End; Scott & Bailey; This Is England '88
Best Entertainment Programme	Best Multichannel Programme	Best Music Programme
Dynamo: Magician Impossible; Britain's Got Talent; Celebrity Juice; Derren Brown – The Experiments: "The Assassin"; The Revolution Will Be Televised; Take Me Out	Cardinal Burns; Celebrity Juice; Dynamo: Magician Impossible; Him & Her; Hunderby; Threesome	The Queen's Diamond Jubilee Concert (BBC); Hackney Weekend 2012 (BBC Three); House Party (Channel 4); Michael Bublé: Home for Christmas (ITV); The Ronnie Wood Show (Sky Arts); Titanic: A Commemoration in Music & Film (BBC Two)
Best News/Current Affairs Programme	Best Original Programme	Best Popular Factual Programme
Sri Lanka's Killing Fields: War Crimes Unpunished; Britain's Gay Footballers (BBC Three); Dispatches: "Britain's Sex Gangs" (Channel 4); ITV News: "The Forgotten Fallen?"; Panorama: "Homs: Journey into Hell"; Syria's Torture Machine (Channel 4)	Holy Flying Circus; All in the Best Possible Taste with Grayson Perry; Hit & Miss; Mummifying Alan: Egypt's Last Secret; My Transsexual Summer; The Undateables	Make Bradford British; Bank of Dave (Channel 4); Britain's Secret Treasures; The Choir: Military Wives; Hippo: Nature's Wild Feast (Channel 4); The Undateables
Best Post Production House	Best Pre-School Programme	Best Single Drama
Envy; Clear Cut Pictures; Films at 59; Molinare TV & Film; Platform Post-production; Splice TV	Baby Jake; Mike the Knight; Mr Bloom's Nursery; Peppa Pig; Rastamouse; Woolly and Tig	My Murder (BBC Three); A Mother's Son; Birdsong; Black Mirror: "The National Anthem"; Holy Flying Circus; Murder: "Joint Enterprise"
Best Soap/Continuing Drama	Best Sports Programme	International Programme Sales
Coronation Street; Casualty; EastEnders; Emmerdale; Holby City; Hollyoaks	The Olympics (BBC Sport); Isle of Man TT Races 2012 (ITV4); London 2012 Paralympics (Channel 4); Trans World Sport (Sky Sports); Volvo Ocean Race 2011-12 (Sky Sports); Wimbledon Men's Final (BBC)	The Audience (ITV); Downton Abbey; Embarrassing Bodies; Misfits; Sherlock
Best Independent Production Company	Channel of the Year	Special Recognition Award
Red Production Company; The Garden Productions; ITN Productions; Neal Street Productions; Twofour; Wall to Wall Media	BBC Two; BBC One; BBC Four; Channel 4; Channel 5; Sky1 HD	

==== 2012 nominations and winners ====
17th annual awards presented: 2 February 2012 – Host: Stephen Mangan
Best Children's Programme	Best Comedy Programme	Best Daytime Programme
Grizzly Tales (Nickelodeon); Horrible Histories; House of Anubis; The Amazing World of Gumball; The Itch of the Golden Nit (BBC Two); The Sarah Jane Adventures	The Inbetweeners; Episodes; Friday Night Dinner; Little Crackers; Miranda; The Trip	The Indian Doctor; 32 Brinkburn Street (BBC One); Antiques Road Trip; Dinner Date – series two; Jamie's 30-Minute Meals; Justice
Best Documentary Programme	Best Documentary Series	Best Drama Series or Serial
Panorama: "Undercover Care: The Abuse Exposed"; My Brother the Islamist; Poor Kids (BBC One); Sri Lanka's Killing Fields; Terry Pratchett: Choosing to Die; For Neda (More4)	Hugh's Fish Fight; 24 Hours in A&E; All Watched Over by Machines of Loving Grace; Coppers; Our War (BBC Three); Strangeways (ITV1)	Downton Abbey; Any Human Heart; Mad Dogs; Misfits; The Crimson Petal and the White; The Hour
Best Entertainment Programme	Best Multichannel Programme	Best Music Programme
Dynamo: Magician Impossible; Celebrity Juice; Strictly Come Dancing; The Apprentice: You're Fired!; The Million Pound Drop Live; The Only Way Is Essex	Our War (BBC Three); Celebrity Juice; Dynamo: Magician Impossible; Getting On; Junior Doctors: Your Life in Their Hands; The Only Way Is Essex	Frankenstein's Wedding; Glastonbury 2011 (BBC); Kylie Minogue's Aphrodite (Sky); Later... with Jools Holland; Live from Abbey Road; This is Michael Bublé
Best News/Current Affairs Programme	Best Original Programme	Best Popular Factual Programme
The Fall of Tripoli (Sky News); BBC News at Ten: "Riots"; ITV News at Ten: "Battle For Misrata"; Japan Earthquake (Channel 4 News); The Royal Wedding (ITV News); UK's Summer Riots (Channel 4 News)	The Trip; Friday Night Dinner; Our War (BBC Three); Random (Channel 4); Scott & Bailey; The Only Way Is Essex	Hugh's Fish Fight; An Idiot Abroad; Dambusters: Building the Bouncing Bomb (Channel 4); Junior Doctors: Your Life in Their Hands; Big Fat Gypsy Weddings; Operation Mincemeat (BBC Two)
Best Post Production House	Best Pre-School Programme	Best Single Drama
Molinare; Deluxe 142; Films at 59; Halo Post; Prime Focus; Technicolor Creative Services	Rastamouse; Baby Jake; Little Charley Bear; Something Special; Octonauts; Tinga Tinga Tales	Appropriate Adult; Eric and Ernie; Hattie; The Road to Coronation Street; Toast; United
Best Soap/Continuing Drama	Best Sports Programme	International Programme Sales
Coronation Street; Casualty; EastEnders; Emmerdale; Holby City; Hollyoaks	F1 – Abu Dhabi (BBC One); 2011 Isle of Man TT (ITV4); Aviva Premiership Final (ESPN); Match of the Day; 2011 FA Cup Final (ESPN); Ryder Cup (global feed)	Big Fat Gypsy Weddings; Jamie's 30 Minute Meals; Doctor Who (series six); Merlin (series three); The Week the Women Went; Torchwood: Miracle Day
Best Independent Production Company	Channel of the Year	Special Recognition Award
Carnival Film & Television; Atlantic Productions; Big Talk Productions; Firecracker Films; Lime Pictures; Red Production Company	Sky One; BBC Two; BBC Three; ITV1; ITV2; Sky News	

==== 2011 nominations and winners ====
16th annual awards presented: 2 February 2011
Best Children's Programme	Best Comedy Programme	Best Daytime Programme
The Gruffalo; Horrible Histories; Junior MasterChef; Roy; Sorry, I've Got No Head; Spirit Warriors	The Thick of It; Benidorm; The IT Crowd; Miranda; Outnumbered; Rev.	Climbing Great Buildings; Antiques Road Trip; Come Dine with Me; Deal or No Deal; Doctors; Loose Women
Best Documentary Programme	Best Documentary Series	Best Drama Series or Serial
Cutting Edge: "Katie – My Beautiful Face"; My Big Fat Gypsy Wedding; Rough Aunties; The Dancing Boys of Afghanistan; Tsunami: Caught On Camera (Channel 4); Wounded (BBC One)	Welcome to Lagos; One Born Every Minute; Our Drugs War (Channel 4); The Bible: A History (Channel 4); The Big School Lottery (BBC Two); Wonders of the Solar System	Five Daughters; Luther; Misfits; Sherlock; Skins; This Is England '86
Best Entertainment Programme	Best Multichannel Programme	Best Music Programme
The Cube; Come Dine with Me; Got to Dance; John Bishop's Britain; Must Be The Music; The X Factor	Misfits; Being Human; Four Weddings; Getting On; Pineapple Dance Studios; The Inbetweeners	Glastonbury 2010 (BBC Two); Children in Need Rocks The UK; Evo Music Rooms; Must Be the Music; Rigoletto: Live from Mantua (BBC Two); Songbook (Sky Arts)
Best News/Current Affairs Programme	Best Original Programme	Best Popular Factual Programme
Our War, Their War: Afghan (Channel 4); Election Special: New Prime Minister (BBC); Five Days That Changed Britain (BBC Two); ITV News at Ten: "Haiti"; Raoul Moat Recordings (ITV1); This World: "An Iranian Martyr"	Misfits; Got to Dance; James May's Toy Stories; One Born Every Minute; Sherlock; This is England '86	Embarrassing Bodies; Inside Incredible Athletes (Channel 4); James May's Toy Stories; Mary Queen of Shops; Pineapple Dance Studios; The Day The Immigrants Left (BBC One)
Best Post Production House	Best Pre-School Programme	Best Single Drama
Clear Cut Pictures; Envy; Films at 59; Halo Post; Molinare; Prime Focus	Something Special; Driver Dan's Story Train; Get Squiggling; Jungle Junction; Roary the Racing Car; Tinga Tinga Tales	Small Island; Blood and Oil (BBC Two); Enid; I Am Slave; Mo; The Fattest Man in Britain
Best Soap/Continuing Drama	Best Sports Programme	International Programme Sales
Emmerdale; Coronation Street; EastEnders; Holby City; The Bill; Waterloo Road	Indian Premier League final (ITV4); Isle of Man TT 2010 (ITV4); Tour de France (ITV4); Winter Olympics (BBC Two); World Cup 2010 (BBC One); World Cup Match of the Day	Undercover Boss; Being Human; Four Weddings; Jamie's American Food Revolution / Jamie Oliver's Food Revolution; Life; MasterChef
Best Independent Production Company	Channel of the Year	Special Recognition Award
Left Bank Pictures; Maverick Television; Mentorn Media; Objective Productions; Ruby Film and Television; Shine TV	E4; BBC One; BBC Three; Channel 4; ITV; Sky One	

==== 2001–2010 winners ====
Best Children's Programme

- 2010: Bookaboo
- 2009: Holi Hana / Hana's Helpline (S4C / Channel 5)
- 2008: My Life as a Popat
- 2007: Charlie and Lola
- 2006: Serious Arctic
- 2005: Tracy Beaker: The Movie of Me
- 2004: Balamory: "The Lost Letter"
- 2003: My Parents Are Aliens

Best Entertainment Programme

- 2010: The X Factor
- 2009: The Apprentice
- 2008: Never Mind the Buzzcocks
- 2007: How Do You Solve a Problem like Maria?
- 2006: Ant & Dec's Saturday Night Takeaway
- 2005: I'm a Celebrity... Get Me Out of Here!
- 2004: Friday Night with Jonathan Ross
- 2003: Pop Idol

Best Daytime Programme

- 2010: Land Girls
- 2009: The Estate We're In (BBC)
- 2008: The Paul O'Grady Show
- 2007: Deal or No Deal
- 2006: The Paul O'Grady Show

Best Music Programme

- 2010: Later Live... with Jools Holland
- 2009: Glastonbury 2008 (BBC)

Best Documentary Series

- 2010: Terry Pratchett: Living with Alzheimer's (BBC Two)
- 2009: The Genius of Charles Darwin
- 2008: Meet The Natives (Channel 4)
- 2007: Planet Earth: "From Pole To Pole"
- 2006: The Power of Nightmares
- 2005: Brat Camp
- 2004: Operatunity

Best Documentary Programme

- 2010: Man on Wire
- 2009: My Street (Channel 4)
- 2008: Dispatches: "China's Stolen Children"
- 2007: True Stories: Sisters in Law (More4)
- 2006: The Real Sex Traffic
- 2005: The Secret Policeman
- 2004: Cutting Edge: "Bad Behaviour"

Best Comedy Programme

- 2010: Outnumbered
- 2009: Gavin & Stacey
- 2008: The Thick of It Special
- 2007: Extras
- 2006: The Catherine Tate Show
- 2005: Little Britain
- 2004: Bo' Selecta!

Best Multichannel Programme

- 2010: The Inbetweeners
- 2009: Ross Kemp in Afghanistan
- 2008: Gavin & Stacey
- 2007: The Virgin Diaries
- 2006: Long Way Round
- 2005: Brainiac: Science Abuse
- 2004: Monkey Dust

Best Drama Series or Serial Programme

- 2010: The Street
- 2009: Criminal Justice
- 2008: Skins
- 2007: Bleak House
- 2006: Doctor Who
- 2005: Shameless
- 2004: State of Play

Best News/Current Affairs Programme

- 2010: Pakistan: Terror's Frontline (Sky News)
- 2009: Zimbabwe: The Stolen Ballots (GuardianFilms)
- 2008: Zimbabwe – The Tyranny and the Tragedy (ITV News)
- 2007: Granada Reports: "The Morecambe Bay Cockling Trial" (ITV)
- 2006: London Bombing 7 July (Sky News)
- 2005: Beslan school siege (ITN)
- 2004: Newsnight: "Blair Special"

Best Original Programme

- 2010: Being Human
- 2009: Gordon Ramsay: Cookalong Live
- 2008: Fonejacker
- 2007: Life on Mars
- 2006: The Thick of It
- 2005: Strictly Come Dancing
- 2004: Wife Swap

Best Popular Factual Programme

- 2010: Inside Nature's Giants
- 2009: The Choir: Boys Don't Sing
- 2008: Grand Designs
- 2007: Ramsay's Kitchen Nightmares
- 2006: Who Do You Think You Are?
- 2005: Top Gear
- 2004: Wife Swap

Best Pre-School Programme

- 2010: In the Night Garden...

Best Soap or Continuing Drama

- 2010: Coronation Street

Best Single Drama

- 2010: A Short Stay in Switzerland
- 2009: Boy (Channel 4)
- 2008: The Relief of Belsen
- 2007: See No Evil: The Moors Murders
- 2006: Sex Traffic
- 2005: Dirty Filthy Love
- 2004: The Second Coming

Best Sports Programme

- 2010: Formula 1 – Monaco Grand Prix (BBC One)
- 2009: John Smith's Grand National Meeting 2008 (BBC One)
- 2008: Match of the Day 2 (BBC Two)
- 2007: 2006 FIFA World Cup Final (BBC One)
- 2006: The Ashes (Channel 4)
- 2005: Olympic Grandstand with Matthew Pinsent (BBC Two)
- 2004: Tour de France 2003 (ITV2)

Channel of the Year

- 2010: ITV1
- 2009: Channel 4
- 2008: BBC Two
- 2007: BBC One
- 2006: Channel 4
- 2005: Living TV
- 2004: BBC Two

International Programme Sales

- 2010: Top Gear
- 2009: Come Dine with Me
- 2008: Dancing on Ice
- 2007: Dancing with the Stars
- 2006: Strictly Come Dancing
- 2005: Idols
- 2004: Wife Swap

Independent Production Company

- 2010: Twofour
- 2009: Talkback Thames
- 2008: Company Pictures
- 2007: Kudos Film and Television
- 2006: RDF Media
- 2005: Company Pictures
- 2004: RDF Media
- 2003: Ideal World
- 2002: RDF
- 2001: Lion Television

Post-Production House

- 2010: Envy
- 2009: Envy
- 2008: Envy
- 2007: Evolutions Television
- 2006: The Farm
- 2005: The Farm
- 2004: The Farm
- 2003: Blue Post Production
- 2002: The Farm
- 2001: The Farm
