= Waybuloo =

British-Canadian animated children's television series

- Created by: Dan Good
- Voices of: Georgia MacPherson; Sunday James-Ross; Finlay Christie; Oliver Dillon
- Narrated by: Dave Lamb (spin-off version)
- Composer: James Burrell
- Countries of origin: United Kingdom; Canada
- Original language: English
- No. of series: 3
- No. of episodes: 150

Production
- Executive producers: Nigel Pickard; Vanessa Hill; Angus Fletcher; Steven DeNure
- Producer: Vanessa Hill
- Cinematography: Keith Reed
- Running time: 20 minutes; 12 minutes (spin-off version)
- Production companies: The Foundation (Note: Produced as The Foundation TV Productions Scotland for Season 3.); DHX Media Toronto (Note: Known as Decode Entertainment for the first two seasons, credited as Decode/Blue Entertainment Inc. for the first two seasons and Decode/Waybuloo Productions 3 Inc. for the third season.)

Original release
- Network: CBeebies (United Kingdom); Treehouse TV (Canada)
- Release: 11 May 2009 – 17 October 2012

Waybuloo is a live-action animated children's television series created by Dan Good and Absolutely Cuckoo. Set in the fictional land of Nara, it features four CGI creatures with large heads and eyes called Piplings who practise a form of yoga which they call "Yogo". They are visited in each episode by live action children who are referred to as "Cheebies". It was broadcast on CBeebies in the UK between 2009 and 2012.

== Background and format ==
Waybuloo was commissioned by Michael Carrington at the BBC, and first aired on CBeebies in May 2009. The 150-episode show was head-written by Marc Seal (who worked on Bob the Builder), filmed by the Foundation in Glasgow and animated by DHX Media. Repeats of the show aired on BBC Two and BBC HD.

The series is set in the fictional land of Nara. The main characters are the four Piplings, 3D CGI animated creatures with large heads and eyes and possessing the ability to fly and float around. They are made in Autodesk Maya, placed on a filmed background, with the second half of each twenty-minute show featuring human children (called the "Cheebies").

The Piplings practice yogo, a gentle form of exercise similar to yoga, which the viewers and their parents can participate in. The Piplings demonstrate several poses inspired by things they see in their homeworld, Nara, such as owls, trees, and insects. Each group of poses indicates a certain group of Cheebies. When the children (or Cheebies) arrive later during an episode, they then practice the same poses demonstrated by the Piplings at the start of the show. The cue for both the Piplings and the Cheebies to perform Yogo is an ancient machine, which activates when sunlight falls upon it.

Yogo was developed by the show's producers in association with a Paediatrician and a Health and Safety Consultant. The leaflet produced by the BBC warns parents not to practise Yogo with their children if they are or have been ill, and always to speak to a GP before starting the program.

The Piplings also play Peeka, a hide and seek game, when the Cheebies (live action children) arrive at Nara. At the end of every episode, when the Piplings find out their problems or are so happy, they experience Waybuloo, where all Piplings rise up towards the sky.

The program makers describe it as "...a philosophy for a happy life, and is like nothing adults will have ever seen before". It was reported that some Christian groups complained that the program promoted Buddhist or Hindu practices.

== Production ==
Post-production, including audio, sound design and editing is done by Platform Post Production. in Toronto, Canada. Line produced by Matt Porter and the series producer is Simon Spencer (who works for Thomas & Friends), part of the independent company, RDF Media's subsidiary The Foundation.

== Characters ==
The Piplings: (from top to bottom) Nok Tok (blue bear), Yojojo (orange monkey), De Li (pink cat), and Lau Lau (purple rabbit).

=== Main characters ===
Lau Lau
Colour: Purple
Lau Lau is a Pipling resembling a rabbit. She has a purple-coloured body, fair skin, green eyes, long ears on top of her head, and a white cottontail. She wears a two-piece white dress. Lau Lau loves painting and can often be seen behind her easel. She is best friends with Yojojo. She is voiced by Georgia MacPherson.
Yojojo
Colour: Orange
Yojojo is a Pipling resembling a monkey. He has an orange-coloured body, fair skin, blue eyes, and has peach rounded monkey ears on the side of his head. He has four thick tufts rising above his right ear which flop over to his left and has a long tail. In Peeka, he is often seen hiding in a log with his tail peeking out. He wears a pair of blue underpants. Yojojo loves playing music and juggling. He is best friends with Lau Lau. He is voiced by Finlay Christie.
Nok Tok
Colour: Blue
Nok Tok is a Pipling resembling a bear. He has a blue-coloured body, tan skin, brown eyes, and has a short tuft on top of his head. He wears a light yellow T-shirt and has a small tail. Nok Tok is the practical one who enjoys fixing and building things. He is best friends with De Li. He is voiced by Oliver Dillon.
De Li
Colour: Pink
De Li is a Pipling resembling a cat. She has a pink-coloured body, fair skin, blue eyes, pointed cat ears on top of her head, and a white tipped tail. She wears a light pink dress and a white flower on top of her head. De Li is very fond of her garden. She is best friends with Nok Tok. She is voiced by Sunday-James Ross.

=== Supporting characters ===
- The Cheebies: A different group of six children (five in Series 3) who play Peeka and Yogo with the Piplings and go in for them in every episode. The Cheebies often find the solutions to the Piplings' problems.
- Narabugs: Four small butterfly creatures who are thought to be the Piplings' pets. Each one is coloured like its respective Pipling.
- Narmoles: Moles that live in Nara that are occasionally featured in episodes.
- Jumpybug: Jumpybug is a grasshopper who occasionally appears in episodes.

== Spin-off version ==
On September 8, 2011, Zodiak Kids announced a “Spin-Off” version of the series. This version would feature shortened 11-minute episodes with the addition of Dave Lamb as the narrator. The changes were said by the company as to be “constructed to work on multiple levels of humor in an effort to appeal to preschoolers and parents alike”.

When this version premiered on CBeebies in January 2012, it was met with much criticism, with comments on the CBeebies Grown-Ups blog criticising Dave Lamb's narration. The negative feedback was so strong that CBeebies decided to pull the spin-off version in favour of the original version on the very next night.

== Episodes ==
Series	Episodes	Originally released	
Series	Episodes	First released	Last released
1	50	11 May 2009	14 August 2010
2	50	16 October 2010	25 September 2011
3	50	20 October 2011	17 October 2012

=== Series 1 (2009–2010) ===
No. overall	No. in series	Title	Plot/Summary	Writer(s)	Air date
1	1	Moving Things	De Li stands on a box to pick plumatoes, but Yojojo wants to store his instruments in it and the other Piplings want to use it to play hopsy. They decide it's better to share it.	Matt Lyons	11 May 2009
2	2	Showtime	Lau Lau wants to dance, but not everyone can fit on her stage, so the Cheebies make a larger space so everyone can dance.	Rebecca Waters	
3	3	Trumpet	Yojojo and Nok Tok find a hollow branch that makes a good trumpet. They go around frightening everyone by blowing it but this frightens Lau Lau's Narabug away. Yojojo plays it softly instead and all the Narabugs come to listen.	Simon Nicholson	
4	4	Strawberries	De Li trains her Narabug to find a strawberry bush by smelling a strawberry. But the Piplings eat them all and have none left for the Narabug to smell. The Cheebies find the bush and pick all the strawberries. When De Li finds it too they're all gone. She's sad until her Narabug traces the strawberries back to the Cheebies and they all eat them.	Anna Starkey	
5	5	Snuggly Nest	Lau Lau makes cushions from Narabug thread, one for each Pipling, but her own cushion goes missing. They trace the unravelled thread to a bird's nest and leave the cushion there.	Louise Kramskoy	
6	6	Whistle	Nok Tok wants to call his Narabug by whistling like the other Piplings but he can't. He practices and eventually works out how.	Dave Ingham	
7	7	Shy Flower	De Li has a large plant in her garden that won't open its flower. She tries putting it in the sun and watering it but it won't flower. Eventually she works out it flowers by stroking it. It produces many seeds and soon the flowers are everywhere.	Simon Nicholson	
8	8	Going Bananas	Lau Lau wants to paint three bananas but when she's gone Yojojo can't resist and eats two of them. The Cheebies stop him eating the last one. When she's finished painting Lau Lau offers it to Yojojo but he wants to share it.	Bar Ben-Yossef	
9	9	Nok Tok's Naracar	Nok Tok offers to help the other Piplings carry some heavy things but there's too much to carry at once. So he makes a car to help transport them.	Matt Lyons	
10	10	Bubble	A huge bubble arrives in Nara and Yojojo tries to keep it from bursting. Eventually it disappears into the sky. Yojojo's sad until the Cheebies find a waterfall making hundreds of bubbles and they have fun bursting them.	Dave Ingham	
11	11	Nok Tok's Happy Plant	Nok Tok's plant is sad, even though he gives it sun, soil and water. He doesn't believe the others when they say it likes music, bongleberries and Cheebies until he's proven wrong. He feels silly until they tell him it's alright to be wrong.	Polly Churchill	
12	12	Counting Seeds	De Li wants to count her jumpy seeds but they keep moving. The others don't help by putting her off her counting, but the Cheebies count with her. When they know how many pots they need they plant them, and they soon flower producing many more seeds.	Anna Starkey	
13	13	Being Brave	Yojojo thinks he's brave until he's scared by the shadow of a big flappy thing. The Cheebies find out that it's the shadow of Yojojo's Narabug and Yojojo feels brave again.	Marc Seal	
14	14	Catch	The Piplings play catch but Nok Tok can't catch. After trying different ways to learn he realises he's been shutting his eyes, so he keeps them open and catches the ball.	Louise Kramskoy	
15	15	Nok Tok Thinks Big	De Li builds a sandcastle but Nok Tok accidentally squashes it. So he builds a new bigger one and needs a lot of help. As it's her present he won't let De Li help, even though she wants to. He finishes it but De Li decides it's not quite finished, and decorates it with special stones.	Dave Ingham	
16	16	Tricky Kicky	Nok Tok wants De Li to play tricky kicky but she can't kick the ball into the goal even using the other Piplings' special techniques. A cheebie gives her a lucky pebble and suddenly she can do it. She loses the pebble and is worried she'll fail, but manages to do score without it.	Bar Ben-Yossef	
17	17	Green Mango	Yojojo and Nok Tok want to eat a mango but it's green and doesn't taste good. De Li tells them it's not ready so they try to make it soft and yellow but that doesn't make it taste better. De Li tells them they can't do it, they have to wait for it to ripen. It does and it tastes much better.	Polly Churchill	
18	18	Songbird	Yojojo finds a bird singing a pretty song and puts it in his basket, but the bird won't sing again no matter what the Piplings do to make it happy. The Cheebies suggest taking it out of the basket and it sings but flies away. They call it back with whistles and Pipling pipes.	Denise Cassar	
19	19	Fruity Fun	Nok Tok gives Lau Lau his fir cones, so she wants to give him a present in return. De Li suggests giving him her mangoes, but now Lau Lau has to find De Li a present. Yojojo suggests his apples, but now Yojojo needs a present. So Nok Tok uses the Anything Machine to turn all the fruit into juice so everyone can have some.	Simon Grover	
20	20	Hiccups	Yojojo has the hiccups so the piplings and cheebies try to find a solution to cure the hiccups.	Denise Cassar	
21	21	Cheep Cheep	While tending her flowers, De Li discovers a sad little bird in her garden. Concerned, she settles it somewhere safe before Yogo. De Li involves the other Piplings in her mission to make the bird happy. But nothing seems to cheer it up. Maybe the Cheebies will know what to do!	Sharon Miller	
22	22	Echo Cave	The Piplings hear their voices echo in a cave and think they have found new friends that are shy and live in the cave.	Simon Grover	
23	23	Frog	De Li finds a frog in her garden, which makes a funny noise. She wants to show the other Piplings and the Cheebies, but it won't make the sound again. De Li eventually remembers that it was laughing at her own funny sound.	Simon Grover	
24	24	Whizzcrackers	The Piplings spot whizzcrackers in the skies over Nara, but Yojojo is easily distracted and keeps missing them. Eventually he stays still long enough to see them.	Dave Ingham	
25	25	Glitter Crystal	Lau Lau makes some wooden crowns, and now needs a sparkle to finish it off. The Piplings then see one nearby, only for it to fade out. All the while, they find special coloured crystals, and eventually find that the sparkle is from the crystals in the sunlight.	Louise Kramskoy	
26	26	Missing Seed	De Li leaves her quick-grow seed with Yojojo to look after, but he's distracted and loses it. Nok Tok finds it and goes to cook it, but Lau Lau finds it and decides to paint it. It disappears again, but a Narabug finds it and plants it in De Li's garden.	Lisa Akhurst	
27	27	Flittery Narabug	Lau Lau wants to paint her Narabug, but it keeps on moving too much, making it hard to paint. Later, she has all the Narabugs in one place, but is still failing to get a perfect picture. When she seemingly gives up, the Cheebies surprise her with folded paintings.	Tracey Hammet	
28	28	Perfect Picnic	Nok Tok has prepared a special picnic for the other Piplings, but several inconveniences spoil the mood. After they all come back even with the Cheebies, Nok Tok is sad about his no-longer-perfect picnic, but the others still think it's perfect.	Dave Ingham	
29	29	Clever Tree	Lau Lau finds a talking tree, which is actually just Yojojo tricking her. Yojojo starts panicking when Lau Lau wants to show the tree to the others, and the Cheebies eventually catch him and tell him to reveal the truth. Lau Lau ends up loving the trick, and everyone else tricks Yojojo back in return.	Roland Moore	
30	30	Mice	Lau Lau hears a sudden squeak, which she thinks may be mice. She and the others try to lure them out with snacks and imitation, to no luck. Eventually, it's revealed that the squeak is just a creaky step near Lau Lau's home.	Mike James	
31	31	Bongleberry Juice	Nok Tok installs a new sail on his Anything Machine which can make bongleberry juice. The wind to power it, however, is intefering with the Piplings' picnic. It eventually stops, but that means no bongleberry juice can be made. The Cheebies improvise by using the trumpet to push wind through to the sail.	Anna Starkey	
32	32	Jumping	The Piplings have made a high jump course, but Yojojo can't jump high enough to clear it. He does learn to do a long jump though, but it doesn't help him over the bar. They instead make several other courses based around the Piplings' best jumping styles.	Simon Nicholson	
33	33	Follow the Pipling	De Li is perfectly happy to play a copying game with her Narabug, but feels too shy to do the same with everyone else. When the Cheebies arrive, one is also shy and she and De Li work together to gain confidence.	Louise Kramskoy	
34	34	Dancing Feet	Lau Lau loves dancing so much that she wants to paint her dancing, but from Pipling Pipes to a music box, she can't get it right. When dancing, a Cheebie knocks over some paint, but another uses their feet to paint a canvas, by dancing.	Lisa Akhurst	
35	35	The Tallest Pipling in Nara	Nok Tok makes a measuring stick, but the others keep taking parts off for other uses. This makes him think he's getting taller. Everyone eventually catches on, at the same time when Nok Tok starts to worry about his size. They tell him about the missing pieces, and it makes Nok Tok relieved.	Polly Churchill	
36	36	Pipling Rhythm	Lau Lau hears Nok Tok hammering in a very rhythmic fassion, and the other Piplings join in with some other sounds. Unfortunately, Lau Lau's feet make no sound at all. The Cheebies recommend she tap her feet on other surfaces, and she succeeds with some small white stones.	Denise Cassar	
37	37	Narabug Chase	Yojojo loves chasing his Narabug, and invites the others to play. This results in the Narabugs going too high up to catch. The Cheebies try luring them down, but it's no help. They all decide to play statues instead, making the Narabugs fly back down to get them.	Matt Lyons & Alison Ray	
38	38	Catch the Plumato	De Li is resting at a plumato tree, when one falls on her. When she finds out how yummy they are, she wants the others to taste them, only for most of them to fall down and go splat. They all find out they can catch them with ease with a huge blanket.	Louise Kramskoy	
39	39	Fireflies	Yojojo wants to put some fireflies in a lantern, and wants Lau Lau to help. She gets distracted however and dances instead. Yojojo, meanwhile, keeps running out of breath before getting the fireflies in, but Lau Lau gets the idea of playing telephone with the Cheebies to get the fireflies into the lantern.	Simon Nicholson	
40	40	Jumpybug	Yojojo is playing his pipes, when an energetic Jumpybug comes out and surprises him. The second surprise makes him lose the pipes, which becomes a problem when both them and the Jumpybug can't be found. They all eventually find the Jumpybug, and that leads Yojojo to reclaim his pipes.	Denise Cassar	
41	41	Leaf	Nok Tok finds a special leaf, which he accidentally lets escape. He has Yojojo help him, but Yojojo keeps getting hurt while getting it, making him sad. Everyone else tries to find the leaf for Nok Tok, until Yojojo manages to find and catch it. Out of thanks, Nok Tok gives the leaf to Yojojo.	Simon Nicholson	
42	42	Picnic	De Li prepares a picnic for the others, only she forgot to bring the food. She finds many fruits with the other Piplings, but De Li doesn't know how to get everything to the picnic. The Cheebies bring the blanket over to the fruit pile, and surprise the Piplings with a full feast. This episode is also known as "De Li's Picnic Problem"	Louise Kramskoy	
43	43	Treasure Hunt	Yojojo plans a treasure hunt for Lau Lau, and hides a treasure chest near the cave. When he and Nok Tok make a trail, a songbird comes and eats most of it. The Cheebies instead make a trail of flowers and twigs, which Lau Lau manages to follow directly towards the chest.	Bar Ben-Yossef	
44	44	Sad Narabug	De Li's Narabug is missing, until the Piplings find it in a bush. It doesn't seem to react to anything they do however, which lead to them thinking the Narabug is sad. A Cheebie then uncovers some leaves to reveal an egg. It shortly hatches, and a new baby Narabug is born.	Lisa Akhurst	
45	45	Balancing	Yojojo has a new trick; balancing a banana on his tail. But when he shows the others, they look away each time, and he's worse when they do look. Everyone then decides to hide behind some huge leaves to let him do his trick, while also being able to watch.	Mike James	
46	46	De Li's Trick	Try as she might, De Li can't decide what to do in the Big Pipling Show. The others each have an entertaining physical trick, but De Li can't seem to match them with one of her own. When the children arrive, they try to inspire her by demonstrating all the things that they can do.	Denise Cassar	
47	47	Ball	Yojojo is playing with an orange ball, but it eventually runs away and knocks down Nok Tok and Lau Lau's things. After clearing the mess, the Cheebies think of a new way Yojojo can play with the ball. They make a board game where they get the ball into a bucket, and Yojojo is the only one to get it in.	Mike James	
48	48	Clouds	Lau Lau and De Li are watching some changing clouds, and Lau Lau wants to draw a picture for De Li. The changing shape however makes it hard to draw properly. Everyone attempts to draw them. but they're all not perfect. The unfinished drawings are piled on, but unintentionally make a picture book.	Anna Starkey	
49	49	Nok Tok Goes Driving	Nok Tok is driving his Naracar so fast he destroys various things, first he cracks open Yojojo's Tricky Kicky ball, then De Li's flower Bed, and finally Lau Lau's beautiful thing she has built. He, and the Cheebies, then make a brake for his Naracar, and some warning signs to help him steer clear of them.	Simon Nicholson	
50	50	Tricky Stick	Lau Lau has a stick that can perform tricks, and Yojojo wants to use it. But because he doesn't know how Lau Lau does it, he thinks the stick broke in his hands. The Cheebies later tell Yojojo that any stick can be a tricky stick, since it's not actually powered by magic, but he has fun with it nonetheless.	Roland Moore	14 August 2010

=== Series 2 (2010–2011) ===
No. overall	No. in series	Title	Plot/Summary	Writer(s)	Air date
51	1	Magical Music	Lau Lau hears some beautiful music. It makes her want to dance, but when the music stops, she looks for its source.	Simon Nicholson	16 October 2010
52	2	A Surprise for Yojojo	Yojojo breaks a drumskin. The others decide to surprise him by fixing it, but while they put him off the scent he thinks they don't love him. He cheers up when he finds out what they were up to.	Polly Churchill	
53	3	Cheebie Tune	Nok Tok makes a xylophone but one of his notes doesn't sound right. So everyone helps him find a bit of wood with the right pitch.	Louise Kramskoy	
54	4	De Li and the Shoehorns	Everyone loves walking with Nok Tok's shoehorns except De Li, who's afraid she won't be able to use them. She overcomes her fear with the help of the others.	Dave Ingham	
55	5	Star	Lau Lau thinks she's found a star that grants her wishes until De Li points out it's only a flower. The Cheebies make her a new star and Nok Tok launches it into the sky with the Anything Machine.	Polly Churchill	
56	6	Singball Statues	Yojojo's good at juggling singballs but eventually drops them. He's upset by this until the Cheebies use his mistakes to play musical statues.	Tracey Hammet	
57	7	Go Get Game	The Piplings play a game where the first to go get a named fruit is the winner. De Li is upset she keeps coming last until they realise she picked all the best fruit to eat.	Roland Moore	
58	8	Pictures	Lau Lau tries to paint the other Piplings but they won't sit still. To make up for it they make her presents but while they're doing that she's able to paint them. The Cheebies surprise everyone with a painting of Lau Lau.	Polly Churchill	
59	9	Snuggly Slide	De Li wants Yojojo to show her how to play lifty leaf but he wants to play on his slide with his snuggly. So the Cheebies get the snuggly its own lifty leaf and he can play with it and help De Li at the same time.	Simon Nicholson	
60	10	De Li's Garden	De Li loves her garden, but not when there are pods flung everywhere. She has the idea to plug up the plant that's making them, but it only gets worse later. It proves to be good though, as large flowers later bloom everywhere.	Simon Nicholson	
61	11	Dance	Nok Tok tries to dance like Lau Lau and De Li, but he can't. Instead he accidentally creates his own dance, which everyone wants to do.	Dave Ingham	
62	12	Lost	De Li wants to play her whistle stick but the others are playing their drums so loudly she can't hear it. She tries to find somewhere quiet to play but gets lost. Then she hears the drums and knows which way to go. The others agree to play quietly and they all play together.	Simon Nicholson	
63	13	The Gift	Lau Lau gives De Li a painting, so De Li wants to get her a gift in return. She gets her flowers but her Narabug eats them, then gets her bongleberries but squashes them. The Cheebies make a painting for Lau Lau but De Li wants to get her something herself, so gives her a huggle.	Dave Ingham	
64	14	Loving Laughing	The Piplings try to make Nok Tok laugh but he wants to work on the Anything Machine. Soon they're worried he's lost his laugh but when he's finished working he gets the Anything Machine to make funny noises he can laugh at.	Denise Cassar	
65	15	Feather	Yojojo finds a feather and sets about finding out where everyone's ticklish. He tries to tickle himself but it doesn't work. He thinks he's lost his tickle until the Cheebies tell him he can't tickle himself, and tickle him all over.	Polly Churchill	
66	16	Neepnip	De Li grows some neepnips for the Narabugs, but De Li's Narabug has a huge one which proves too hard to pull out. Even with ten at the stem, it proves difficult, until the brave Narabug comes in and helps them get it out. Known on DVD releases as "Enormous Neepnip"	Tracey Hammet	
67	17	Pipling Pegs	Lau Lau wants Nok Tok to make some pegs for a board game, but Nok Tok makes them in the wrong shape and bolted them in anyway. The Cheebies make different games instead, including one where the ruined board is used as a table.	Denise Cassar	
68	18	No Talk Game	Yojojo wants to play the No Talk Game. He tries not to say anything, but the other Piplings keep making him talk. Later, everyone plays the game, and everyone's performance makes Yojojo look great at it.	Matt Lyons & Alison Ray	
69	19	Dry Garden	It's a very hot day in Nara, and De Li's flowers are wilting. She works hard to water them, but gets distracted helping everyone else. Now it's everyone else's turn to help De Li and her sad flower.	Simon Grover	
70	20	Carrobeet Day	De Li grows some carrobeets for Carrobeet Day, until they all start disappearing. She starts pinning it on the others, but it's later revealed to be a Narmole. After following it, they find all the carrobeets in-tact, since the Narmole only wanted the leaves.	Denise Cassar	
71	21	Lau Lau's Story	Lau Lau is thinking of a 'Big Brave Lau Lau' story, and the others help her out. Unfortunately, her ideas could only carry her so far, but the Cheebies give one final idea that concludes the story wonderfully.	Simon Grover	
72	22	Toot Toot	Nok Tok wants his Naracar to make a noise, but the one Yojojo suggests is too loud for the others. The Cheebies briefly become the noise, but the frog's singing proves as a good replacement.	Bar Ben-Yossef	
73	23	Statue	De Li finds a lovely statue, but Lau Lau has already declared it hers. The others have also already found some. However, all the statues face to the trails leading to them, and one trail eventually leads to the biggest statue of all. This episode is errornously confused with "Snuggly" on streaming.	Simon Nicholson	
74	24	Choosy	Lau Lau, and the other Piplings to an extent, are having trouble deciding on two things they think look good. The Cheebies tell them that they don't need to choose, and they can mix their options together.	Polly Churchill	
75	25	Walking Backwards	Yojojo's backwards walking is proving too hard for Nok Tok, while everyone else manages to do it swimmingly. With the Cheebies' help with some stone trails, Nok Tok manages to build his confidence back and walk backwards with ease.	Polly Churchill	
76	26	String Goes Ping	Yojojo plays his banjojo for the Narabugs, but breaks a string. The Cheebies help find a new string, and eventually land on a strand of Narabug thread. It proves to work perfectly as before.	Tracey Hammet	
77	27	Where Have All The Narabugs Gone?	It's almost time for Narabug Fly-by Day, but De Li scares them off after they got peckish. While searching for them, all the gathered bongleberries are snatched away by them. When they're finally found, De Li apologises to them, and the fly-by can now commence.	Dave Ingham	
78	28	Singing Bowl	Lau Lau finds a bowl in a cave and looks for a way everyone can use it together. After an accident with a plumato, the Cheebies discover it makes a sound they can dance to.	Denise Cassar	
79	29	Bop Bop Bat	Nok Tok makes bop bop bats but Yojojo breaks his. He tries to fix it himself without telling Nok Tok but in the end only Nok Tok can mend it.	Katie Simmons	
80	30	Nok Tok's Narabug	Nok Tok's concerned his Narabug isn't good at anything. This makes it sad, so he decides it's good at being a friend. It cheers up enough to win the blow-leaf race.	Bar Ben-Yossef	
81	31	Old Made New	Yojojo breaks his special bowl and bongleberries just don't taste as good from any other bowl. So Nok Tok fixes the bowl with mud in the Anything Machine.	Denise Cassar	
82	32	Pipling Playday	Lau Lau finds she's no good at any of the games because her long ears keep getting in the way. That's until she finds they make her the best at spinning.	Lisa Akhurst	
83	33	Sssh!	Nok Tok scares away the bird Lau Lau's trying to paint with sounds he's recorded on the Anything Machine. So he records the bird's song to attract it instead.	Polly Churchill	
84	34	Enough	Yojojo collects many flowers for the Piplings. Then he realises he's picked them all and ruined De Li's favourite place. So the Cheebies make a giant flower picture instead.	Anna Starkey	
85	35	Pod Men	Lau Lau and Yojojo make a pod man, fixing the head with mud. Nok Tok makes a pod man but the head falls off. He won't ask for help. His pride dented, he gets everyone to work together to make a pod face instead.	Simon Nicholson	
86	36	Too Slow	De Li keeps losing races against Yojojo and wants to go faster. But when she comes last in a race around Nara she decides being slow is good as it enabled her to collect some nice things.	Anna Starkey	
87	37	Chimey Leaves	Lau Lau finds a plant whose leaves chime when they knock together. She takes the leaves home but then no one else can hear them chime. So they plant it in De Li's garden where everyone can hear.	Katie Simmons	
88	38	Nok Tok's Rock	Nok Tok finds a box full of useful objects and hands them out to the Piplings. Everyone's pleased except Nok Tok, who's left with a rock. The Cheebies show him he can use it to play games, but then it gets broken. So he uses the hollow halves to make clip-clop sounds like a horse.	Dave Ingham	
89	39	Swapping	Lau Lau swaps her paintbrushes for Yojojo's banjojo, but neither of them are any good at the other's hobby. So Lau Lau paints the banjojo and Yojojo uses the brushes as drumsticks.	Dave Ingham	
90	40	Bluebell	Yojojo tricks everyone into thinking bluebells ring when they touch them. Soon everyone's tricking each other with sounds, so they decide instead to make noise together.	Matt Lyons	
91	41	The Search For Lau Lau's Glowstone	Lau Lau finds a glowstone, and immediately loses it. The Piplings help look for it but only find things they'd lost. The Cheebies suggest retracing her steps.	Dave Ingham	
92	42	Yojojo's Plumpkin	The Piplings grow vegetables for soup, but Yojojo doesn't want to eat his huge plumpkin so it can grow bigger. The Cheebies tell him it might go off and get smaller, so he picks it straight away and plants the seeds for more plumpkins.	Matt Lyons & Alison Ray	
93	43	Fairy Thing	De Li finds a floaty, sparkly thing in her shed which the Piplings think might be a fairy. The Cheebies realise they are fireflies and build a new home for them in De Li's shed.	Simon Grover	
94	44	Surprise	Nok Tok sets up the Anything Machine to give the Cheebies a bubble surprise. He leaves it with Yojojo to look after but he accidentally sets it off. Yojojo hides it in De Li's shed so the surprise isn't ruined, but the bubbles escape and the Cheebies see them. Nok Tok doesn't mind as the Cheebies love the bubbles anyway.	Dave Ingham	
95	45	Round and Round	Nok Tok finds a golden feather and puts it in a safe place. The other Piplings find it, not realising it's Nok Tok's, and hide it somewhere else. Soon none of them can find it. When they realise they're all looking for the same feather they search for it together, until a bird finds it.	Wayne Jackman	
96	46	Swapsy Box	The Piplings each put presents in a box and swap them. De Li is puzzled by the stick in her box until she discovers it's for planting special seeds in her garden.	Bar Ben-Yossef	
97	47	Den For Ten	Lau Lau makes a den, but when the other Piplings join her it falls down. So they make the den bigger by flipping it upside down.	Louise Kramskoy	
98	48	Shaker Breaker	Yojojo lets Nok Tok play with his shakers but he loses one. The Cheebies make new shakers but De Li finds Yojojo's in her bush.	Mike James	
99	49	Lau Lau's Quiet Day	Lau Lau and the Jumpybug have a quiet day, but everyone else is too noisy. Everyone decides to sit in a circle for some quiet, but the Jumpybug surprises them, and they have a loud day instead.	Denise Cassar	
100	50	Snuggly	Yojojo has lost his Snuggly, and Nok Tok goes to make him a new one. While that happens, Yojojo finds his old one near De Li's shed. He still accepts Nok Tok's effort, giving him two to snuggle with at night. This episode is errornously known as "Nok Tok Goes Away" on streaming, being confused with Season 1's "Nok Tok Goes Driving".	Polly Churchill	25 September 2011

Footnote 1: S02E38 does not have a title recorded, although it has been aired by the BBC.

=== Series 3 (2011–2012) ===
Series 3 aired on CBeebies beginning 3 October 2011.

No. overall	No. in series	Title	Plot/Summary	Writer	Air date
101	1	Crawly Caterpillar	Lau Lau finds a Caterpillar in her home, but doesn't know why it's there. Nok Tok tries to find the caterpillar a bed, but it doesn't want one. The Piplings and Cheebies find it food, but it's not hungry. A Cheebie finds another caterpillar. it turns out Lau Lau's caterpillar was lonely.	Polly Churchill	20 October 2011
102	2	Happiness Parade	Yojojo wants everyone to do one thing together that makes them happy.	Denise Cassar	
103	3	Nok Tok's Promise	When a bird, who Nok Tok's Narabug loves flying with, flies away, Nok Tok promises his Narabug that he’ll find it.	Denise Cassar	
104	4	Thirsty Day	It's a hot day in Nara. De Li tries to give Caterpillar a drink of water, but other animals keep drinking it.	Louise Kramskoy	
105	5	Most Beautiful Thing	Everyone has really beautiful things, except De Li. The Piplings and Cheebies put all their beautiful things together to make one big beautiful thing for her.	Polly Churchill	
106	6	Yojojo's Twinkler Show	Yojojo has twinkers in his home, which make coloured lights. he brings them outside to show the other piplings, but they don’t work in the light, so Nok Tok and the Cheebies look for a dark place where everyone can see the twinkler show.	Denise Cassar	
107	7	Lau Lau's Picture	Lau Lau makes a picture of Nara and gives it to Yojojo, but she is sad to see it go.	Bar Ben-Yossef	
108	8	Narabug Games	De Li wants to find a game she and her Narabug can do together.	Simon Grover	
109	9	Bye Bye Snuggly	Yojojo and De Li play on the shoehorns, when De Li falls off. Yojojo gives her his Snuggly to cheer her up, but now Yojojo is sad that he doesn't have his Snuggly. Lau Lau, Nok Tok and the Cheebies make him a new Snuggle, but De Li gives Yojojo his old Snuggly back. So they give the new Snuggly to De Li.	Mike James	
110	10	Home Swapsy	Lau Lau loves the other Piplings' homes, so they swap homes with each other. But Lau Lau can't find the right home for herself.	Bar Ben-Yossef	
111	11	Happy Yojojo	Lau Lau, De Li and Nok Tok gather presents for the cheebies.	Louise Kramskoy	
112	12	A Surprise For De Li	Nok Tok and Lau Lau decorate an arch with flowers, as a present for De Li. Yojojo has to keep it a secret from De Li until it's ready.	Bar Ben-Yossef	
113	13	Feely Box	Nok Tok puts things in a box for everyone to feel inside for a game.	Bar Ben-Yossef	
114	14	De Li's Harvest	When De Li has so many food harvested, she gives them to the other Piplings and Cheebies. They also share their presents, but De Li thinks they don't like them.	Polly Churchill	
115	15	De Li's Dance	Nok Tok, Lau Lau and Yojojo perform an animal dance show for the Cheebies.	Mike James	
116	16	Lau Lau's Bird	A lovely bird flies by and sings for Lau Lau, but then it flies away and doesn't come back.	Simon Grover	
117	17	Flower Surprise	De Li makes a flower surprise for the other Piplings without them knowing who there from.	Bar Ben-Yossef	
118	18	Flowerstrings	Nok Tok tries to make a flowerstring.	Chris Parker	
119	19	Cloud Gazing	Nok Tok wants to gaze at the shaped clouds, but the other Piplings give him lots of things to fix.	Polly Churchill	
120	20	Follow Nok Tok		Mike James	
121	21	Bell-buloo		Bar Ben-Yossef	
122	22	Froggy Rock		Denise Cassar	
123	23	Nok Tok Builds a Follow Box		Simon Grover	
124	24	Bongleberry Bubbles		Mike James	
125	25	Neither Nest		Polly Churchill	
126	26	Glittery Narmole		Polly Churchill	
127	27	Go Yojojo		Mike James	
128	28	De Li's Flower		Simon Grover	
129	29	The Plumpkin and the Caterpillar	De Li finds a caterpillar on her plumpkin.	Mike James	
130	30	Very Special Flower		Polly Churchill	
131	31	Sneezy Nok Tok		Louise Kramskoy	
132	32	Nok Tok's Talent		Polly Churchill	
133	33	Yojojo's Big Music Day		Denise Cassar	
134	34	Hop Chase Game		Polly Churchill	
135	35	Narmole Trouble		Denise Cassar	
136	36	Lau Lau's Special Day		Polly Churchill	
137	37	Narmole Day		Mike James	
138	38	Puppet Show		Louise Kramskoy	
139	39	Wobbly Wheelbarrow		Denise Cassar	
140	40	Narabug and Songbird		Denise Cassar	
141	41	Blossom Berry Hop		Simon Nicholson	
142	42	Everybody Happy		Simon Nicholson	
143	43	Needing Help		Simon Nicholson	
144	44	Yojojo Wants to Share		Simon Nicholson	
145	45	Being Happy		Simon Nicholson	
146	46	Everyone Play Together		Simon Nicholson	
147	47	Lost Leaf		Simon Nicholson	
148	48	Keep Trying		Simon Nicholson	
149	49	Trumpet Up Top		Simon Nicholson	
150	50	Can't Do It		Simon Nicholson	17 October 2012

== DVD releases ==
=== United Kingdom ===
DVD releases of the series were released by 2Entertain. Later DVDs were released by Delta Leisure.

Release name	UK release date
Meet the Piplings	26 October 2009
Adventures in Nara	30 November 2009
Piplings Love to Play	29 March 2010
Hi-Hi Cheebies	6 September 2010
Piplings Feel Buloo	22 November 2010
1-5 Box Set	6 December 2010
Piplings Love to Care	23 May 2011
Piplings Love to Share	19 September 2011
Piplings Love to Exercise	5 March 2012
Piplings Love to Help	24 September 2012
Piplings Love to Explore	3 December 2012
Box Set Volume 2	10 December 2012
Being Brave & Four Other Stories	24 February 2014
Going Bananas & Four Other Stories	24 February 2014
Nook Took's Nara Car & Four Other Stories	24 February 2014
Hiccups & Four Other Stories	24 February 2014
Magical Music & Four Other Stories	24 March 2014
Dancing Feet & Four Other Stories	24 March 2014
Nook Took Rock & Five Other Stories	23 June 2014
Pipling Pegs & Five Other Stories	23 June 2014
Swapsy Boxes & Five Other Stories	23 June 2014
Pipling Fun	3 September 2014

=== Canada ===
In February 2010, DHX Media announced that Nelvana Enterprises would be the show's Canadian Home Video partner.

== See also ==
- Holland Publishing

== External sources ==
- BBC iPlayer with episodes aired in series 2
