= Evolutions Television =

Television post-production company in London

- Type: Private
- Industry: Television post-production
- Genre: Factual, entertainment
- Predecessor: Nats Post Production
- Founded: 1994; 32 years ago
- Headquarters: London, United Kingdom
- Services: Audio, editing, grading, design
- Revenue: £10 million
- Website: evolutions.tv

Evolutions Television, commonly known as Evolutions (or more simply Evos), is a television post-production company in London, England. It has a site in Soho in Sheraton Street, and a design facility on Wells Street called Earth. Evolutions has been used for programmes including The Apprentice, The F Word, and Top Gear. The company won the 2007 Broadcast Award for Post House of the Year, and in 2010, it was ranked ninth on Televisual magazine's "Facilities 50" list.

Evolutions had a building in Soho Square that it vacated in 2011, around the same time that its senior management team bought out Albion Ventures' stake in the company.

== Credits ==
- Made in Chelsea
- Seven Days
- Ramsay's Best Restaurant
- The Apprentice
- An Idiot Abroad
- The Only Way Is Essex
- 71 Degrees North
- Top Gear
- Junior Apprentice
- QI
- Biggest Loser
- Red Dwarf: Back to Earth
- Brit Cops: Zero Tolerance
- The Victorians
- Hospital Heroes
- Property Ladder
- Shipwrecked: Battle of the Islands
- Disaster Eye Witness
- The Secret Millionaire
- Stewart Lee's Comedy Vehicle
- Sound
- Cash in the Celebrity Attic
- Iran and the West
- Weaponology
- Picture This
- Wife Swap
- Police Camera Action!
- I Own Britain's Best Home and Garden
- Gladiators
- Rory and Paddy's Great British Adventure
- The One and Only...
- Project Catwalk
- Best of Friends
- Bring Back... Star Wars
- Grand Designs Live
- Long Way Down
- Fur TV

== See also ==
- Soho media and post-production community
