= Can't Pay? We'll Take It Away! =

British factual television series

- Genre: Factual television
- Narrated by: Jason Done
- Country of origin: United Kingdom
- Original language: English
- No. of seasons: 5

Production
- Production company: Brinkworth Films

Original release
- Network: Channel 5
- Release: 24 February 2014 – 17 May 2018

Can't Pay? We'll Take It Away! is a British factual series that was broadcast on Channel 5 from 2014 to 2018. Produced by Brinkworth Films, it follows High Court enforcement agents as they carry out High Court writs on behalf of creditors and landlords, seizing goods from debtors or evicting tenants. The programme filmed the High Court enforcement and repossession teams of Direct Collection Bailiffs Ltd (DCBL).

== Production ==
The series was produced by Brinkworth Films for Channel 5 and first aired on 24 February 2014. DCBL's website says the programme ran to five series and more than 85 episodes.

Enforcement agents who appeared in the programme included Steve Pinner and Paul Bohill.

== Privacy complaints and legal action ==
=== Ofcom ===
Several episodes of the programme were assessed by the broadcasting regulator Ofcom following complaints. In 2015, Ofcom considered three complaints from individuals featured in the first series and found that they had not been subject to an unwarranted infringement of privacy, despite being filmed with both body-worn and conventional cameras.

In October 2017, Ofcom found an unwarranted infringement of privacy in one episode, reversing an earlier decision after it received supplementary information that the body-worn cameras used by the agents had been supplied by the programme makers rather than their employers, which undermined the argument that they were used for health and safety purposes. The complainant had not been told that the footage would be broadcast. Ofcom later found similar breaches in other episodes, including syndicated episodes from earlier series.

=== Court cases ===
In February 2018, the High Court ruled in Ali and Aslam v Channel 5 Broadcasting Ltd that the inclusion of a couple's private information in an episode showing their eviction went beyond what was justified, and awarded them damages.

In a statement in open court on 5 July 2023, Channel 5 apologised to the subjects of an episode in which enforcement agents' body cameras had recorded footage in private areas of a church.

=== Claim against DCBL ===
In February 2022, the Mirror reported that Steve Pinner and Paul Bohill had begun High Court proceedings against DCBL, claiming around £200,000. They alleged that DCBL had underpaid them and broken agreements made when the programme began, including an agreed share in the company. DCBL's owner told the Sunday People that the claim had no validity.

== Aftermath ==
The programme was cancelled in 2018. A similar series about High Court enforcement agents, Call the Bailiffs: Time to Pay Up, began on Channel 5 on 19 July 2021.

== See also ==
- The Sheriffs Are Coming
