= Craig Kelly (actor) =

British actor and voice over artist

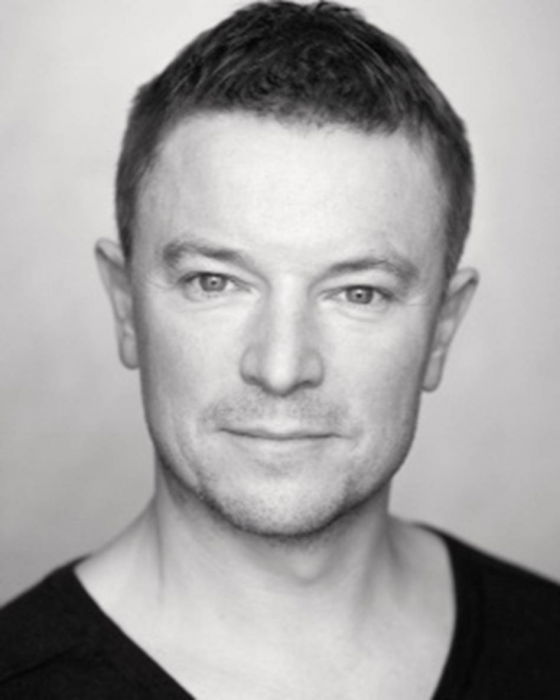
- Kelly in 2012
- Born: 31 October 1970 (age 56); Lytham St Annes, England
- Occupations: Actor and voice over narrator
- Years active: 1992–present
- Spouse: Camilla Kelly (m. 2009)
- Relatives: Dean Lennox Kelly (brother)

Craig Kelly (born 31 October 1970) is an English actor and voice-over narrator. He is known for his roles as Vince Tyler in the Channel 4 television series Queer as Folk and as Luke Strong in Coronation Street.

== Early life ==
Kelly was born on 31 October 1970 in Lytham St Annes near Blackpool, Lancashire. He is the brother of actor Dean Lennox Kelly.

== Career ==
Kelly moved to London and attended the Drama Centre from 1989 to 1992, where he studied the Stanislavski School of method acting alongside John Simm and Joe Duttine.

Graduating in 1992, Kelly played a minor speaking role in Titanic as Assistant Wireless Operator, Harold Bride and also as Russell Muir in the film When Saturday Comes.

=== TV work ===
Kelly is best known for his role as Vince Tyler in Queer as Folk. He also appeared in Casualty as Daniel Perryman between 1995 and 1996. A very brief role was as the Mercedes-Benz driver in the "Rabbit in Your Headlights" video, who utters the line 'Nice coat, mate', before speeding off. In the 1998 BBC series of The Children of the New Forest, Craig played Abel Courbould, the villainous puritan preacher. Craig also starred opposite Amanda Holden in the ITV series The Grimleys as Mr Treblecock, the school lothario. He played the young father of Alison Mundy in a second series episode of Afterlife in 2006.

In 2003, Kelly featured in the webcast Doctor Who adventure Scream of the Shalka. He later guest-starred in the third series of the BBC's Waking the Dead, in which he played a transgender woman who is released from prison on appeal after murdering her father.

In November 2008, Kelly landed the role of the new Underworld factory boss, Luke Strong, in ITV's Coronation Street. His character first appeared on 20 February 2009 and Kelly departed in the episode that aired on 19 October 2009.

On 25 August 2009, it was announced that he would take part in Series 7 of BBC One's Strictly Come Dancing, partnering Flavia Cacace. Kelly was the 8th celebrity eliminated from the competition on 7 November 2009 in a special show from Blackpool Tower Ballroom. Kelly starred alongside his brother in the ITV1 drama Collision, which aired over five consecutive nights in November 2009.

In 2023, he appeared as Peter Jeffries in BBC One miniseries Boat Story.

=== Film work ===
He played the key role of Cristian O'Neill in The Young Americans, with Harvey Keitel (1993). Kelly was also in James Cameron's 1997 film Titanic and played the part of radio operator Harold Bride. He appeared in Spice World with a minor speaking role in which he speaks to Geri (Ginger Spice). Kelly had a small role in the 1999 sci-fi film Wing Commander playing Falk, the ship's radar man.

=== Voice-over work ===
Kelly is a prolific voiceover artist, appearing on numerous adverts as well as BBC idents and, more recently, on Channel 4 idents. He narrated for various television programmes, including Channel 4's Shipwrecked: Battle of the Islands (2006–2009), E4's Shipwrecked: The Island 2011 (2s narration on Sally Morgan's Star Psychic Show, series 6 of The Real Hustle on BBC Three (a show his brother narrated for two series) and more recently, the popular Channel 4 show Rich House Poor House. He is currently the station voice for Manchester's Key 103.

== Personal life ==
Kelly and his wife Camilla married in 2009. He has a keen interest in kickboxing, in which he has a black belt.

== Filmography ==
Year	Title	Role	Notes
1992	Screen One	Uncredited	TV series (episode: "Running Late")
1993	The Good Guys	Stephen Croxley	TV series (episode: "Old School Ties")
1993	The Young Americans	Christian O'Neill	
1993	Casualty	Ian Wheater	
1994	Beyond Bedlam	Matthew Hamilton	
1994	Ellington	Billy Trant	Television film
1995	A Touch of Frost	Paul Gower	TV series (episode: "Dead Male One")
1995	The Adventures of Young Indiana Jones: Attack of the Hawkmen	Anthony Fokker	Television film
1995–1996	Casualty	Daniel Perryman	Series 10
1996	When Saturday Comes	Russell Muir	
1996	Ellington	Billy Trant	
1997	Titanic	Harold Bride	
1997	Spice World	Nervous Guy	
1998	Children of the New Forest	Abel Corbould	Television film
1999	Wing Commander	Radar Man Falk	
1999	Killing Joe	Lead	Short film
1999–2000	Queer as Folk	Vince Tyler	Main role
2000	Undertaker's Paradise		
2001	The Grimleys	Dave Trebilcock	Episode: "The Grimley Curse"
2002	Clocking Off	Eddie Mackintosh	Episode: "Mack's Story"
2002	Having It Off	Billy Bob Rivers	Episode: "Lock, Stock, and Two Smoking Hairdryers"
2002	Silent Cry	Robert Mosley	
2003	Oh Marbella!	Ashley	
2003	Helen of Troy	Pollux	Voice only; 5 episodes
2003	3 Blind Mice	Frank	
2003	Spine Chillers	Jack	TV series (episode: "The Lovegods")
2003	Waking the Dead	Mark/Maria Lovell	TV series (episode: "Walking on Water" (Parts 1 and 2)"
2003	Doctor Who: Scream of the Shalka	Joe	
2005	Silent Witness	Connelly	TV series (episode: "Choices: Part 1")
2006	Hotel Babylon	Pete	Recurring role (series 1)
2006	Totally Frank	Nick	Recurring role (series 2)
2006	Dalziel and Pascoe	Eddie Wilcox	Episode: "Fallen Angel: Part 1 & 2"
2006	Afterlife	Young Stan Mundy	Episode: "Mind the Bugs Don't Bite"
2006–2009	Shipwrecked: Battle of the Islands	Narrator	
2007	Are You Ready for Love?	Leo	
2007	The Soul Rescuer	Shadow Man	Short film
2008	The Gatekeeper	Jack	Video
2008	The Real Hustle	Narrator	Series 6
2009	Hammered	Rod	Short film
2009	Collision	Jeffrey Rampton	Recurring role
2009	Coronation Street	Luke Strong	78 episodes
2009	Strictly Come Dancing	Contestant	Series 7
2012	Monroe	Phil Indale	Episode: "No. 2.4"
2012	Circles	Estate Agent	Short film
2012	A Life's Debt	Julian	Short film
2017	Fish Finger Sandwich	Ivor	Short film
2017–	Rich House Poor House	Narrator	
2019	Trick or Treat	Greg Kielty	Also producer
2021	The Mallorca Files	Lee Flack	Episode: "The Beautiful Game"
2023	Boat Story	Peter Jeffries	4 episodes
