= Holland Publishing =

UK publishing house

- Founded: 1980
- Founders: Bill and Sheila Holland
- Country of origin: United Kingdom
- Headquarters location: Woodford Green, Essex
- Key people: Jonathan Holland
- Publication types: Books
- Official website: www.holland-publishing.co.uk

Holland Publishing PLC is an independent UK publishing house specialising in children's activity, sticker and colouring books. The company is based in Woodford Green, Essex, United Kingdom. The company was formed in 1980 by husband and wife, Bill and Sheila Holland.

The company was one of the first publishers to sell children's books into non-traditional markets such as Tesco and other supermarkets. Bill Holland died in November 2004, having worked full-time until the age of 74 and with over 60 years experience in the toy and publishing industries.

The business is now managed by his son, Jonathan Holland.

The company is a member of the Equitoy Equitoy Trade Association and is committed to adhere to the association's Code of Conduct.

Among the series published by the company are Doodle Design, Learning is Fun, Colouring is Fun, Puzzle Zone and Stickers are Fun as well as children's jigsaws. Aside from its own list, the company works with many leading UK retailers and consumer products companies to create own label books and stationery ranges.

In November 2008 the company achieved Forest Stewardship Council(FSC)accreditation. The company has made a clear commitment to prioritising the use of forest-friendly FSC paper in its future publications through its updated Environmental Policy Statement

In March 2009 the company launched its Little Star Creations imprint, focusing on licensed products at the London Book Fair. In November 2009 it said that its move into licensing would grow its sales by 51% over three years.

The company has since won notable new licenses to its Little Star Imprint, including Waybuloo, Big and Small, Dora the Explorer, Peppa Pig, Mr. Men, Groovy Chick and A Little Princess for various products including children's headphones and magnetic height charts.
