= Soho media and post-production community =

Much of the British independent film, television and post-production industry is based in London's Soho area. Many of the people who work in the industry form a village-like community, with the various companies hiring and re-hiring one another's employees, and, like many other villages, having informal meetings.

Post-production companies in Soho include:

- Ascent Media
- Double Negative
- Framestore CFC
- Goldcrest Post-Production
- Moving Picture Company
- Evolutions Television
- Reliance MediaWorks Ltd
- Rushes.

== Locations ==
The above listed "Cinesite" company is near London's Piccadilly Circus, though there is also a non-graphical department based at Pinewood Studios, who made some of mechanical props for the Harry Potter films, amongst other productions.

"The Mill" is at the western end of Dean Street and is in a white 3-storey building with a purple door. Whereas a rival Co "Framestore-CFC" is just a minutes walk away along the same road, being midway along, on a corner, with a large windowed frontage along its ground-floor.

Also, though not media related, but CGI related, is Sony's PlayStation game creation department of Europe, which is also located in London's Soho, specifically off Golden Square, the latter having a sleeping-giant sculpture that is opposite the front door of SCE. This video-game studio is housed in a large stone-built building with a brass plaque out front.

== See also ==
- Groucho Club
