= The Detectives (2015 TV series) =

British television documentary series

The Detectives is a British television documentary series that first aired in 2015. The first series was broadcast on BBC Two as a three-part documentary series airing over three consecutive nights from 17 May 2015. The first series followed investigators at Greater Manchester Police's sex crimes unit, focusing on the investigation into historical sex crimes committed by disc jockey Ray Teret, and his subsequent trial and conviction for those offences.

A second, four-part series, titled The Detectives: Murder on the Streets began airing on 20 September 2017, this time shadowing members of Greater Manchester's Murder Investigation Team.

A third, five-part series, titled The Detectives: Fighting Organised Crime began airing on 23 March 2021, once again following Greater Manchester Police.
