= Four to the Floor (TV series) =

- Created by: Lemonade Money
- Country of origin: United Kingdom
- No. of series: 5
- No. of episodes: 28

Production
- Producers: James Payne Faraz Osman, Jeremy Cole
- Editors: Ben Boullier, Julian Fletcher
- Running time: 30 minutes inc adverts

Original release
- Network: Channel 4
- Release: 25 September 2014

Four to the Floor is a music magazine programme originally broadcast as a four-part series on Channel 4 from September 2014 and returned for a second series in 2015. The show is intended to showcase modern alternative music and features live performances, short films, animations and music videos.

The show was awarded "Best Music Programme" at the 2015 Broadcast Awards

== Episodes ==
The first episode focused on MC culture and was broadcast on 25 September 2014. It featured performances from artists including Joey Bada$$ and Little Simz, as well as music from Mac DeMarco, Majid Jordan and Novelist.
