= Punk Chef =

English chef and television presenter

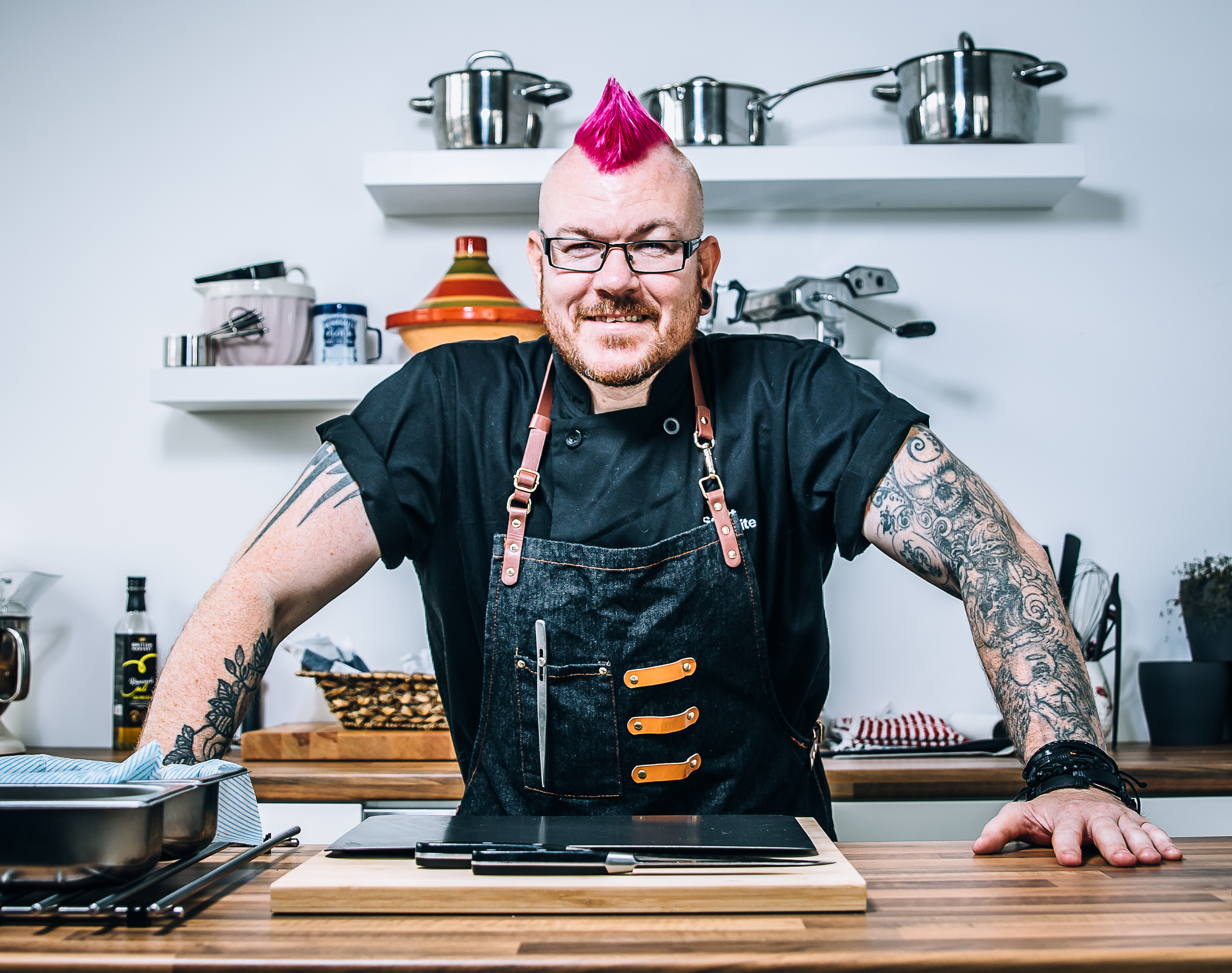
Punk Chef

Scott Garthwaite (born 22 January 1980) also known by his TV name Punk Chef, is a professional chef and television presenter. He has appeared in several TV cooking shows showcasing sign language with food which has made him one of the first deaf chef to emerge in mainstream television.

== Early life ==
Garthwaite was born and raised in Hartlepool in the North East of England. He was born hearing and at the age of 2 as he was diagnosed with meningitis that turned him deaf. He left his deaf school in Middlesbrough with seven GCSE qualifications. Garthwaite learned his culinary trade in 2003 after living temporarily in Jordan. He enrolled at Hartlepool College of Further Education then went on to completed a Degree in Culinary and Patisseries Art from Newcastle College in partnership with Leeds Metropolitan University.

== Career ==
Garthwaite started his culinary training at Rockliffe Hall in Hurworth, Darlington then later he went on to work at Truffle Restaurant in Darlington. While he was studying for his degree as he began to make videos blogs in British Sign Language for social media for the deaf community and he was noticed by Flashing Lights, a deaf led production company, who then created the Punk Chef TV cooking series for the deaf community. Garthwaite went on to make 9 programmes for BSL Zone which include Punk Chef's Kids Challenge. He said "The programme aims to show the deaf community how easy it is to make simple and tasty meals and that their disability should not be seen as a barrier to learning a new skill, the fact that I’m deaf myself means that I’m able to relate to deaf people on a much more personal level, making it easier to guide them through the cooking process. Chefs like Jamie Oliver, Gordon Ramsay and Heston Blumenthal have been inspiring people to improve their cooking habits for years, so it’s great to be able to do the same for the deaf community".

In December 2015, Garthwaite made an appearance on BBC Two's See Hear.

In November 2017, in an appearance on BSL Zone's Up For It kids programme, Garthwaite was invited to meet a young deaf chef.

2018 - 2019 Punk Chef on the Road TV Series. Scott toured around the UK to talk about food in each city with special guests. This can be seen on BSL Zone.

2023 - The Launch of the Punk Truck Scott has launched his first food truck that has a name on it 'Punk Chef' in Spitalfields, London.

== Football ==
Garthwaite was the manager of Sunderland Deaf Association Football Club, a community football club under Sunderland AFC's charity the Foundation of Light. He became the first deaf manager in the history of North East to win the England Deaf Football League and Cup double also the first manager to bring home the England Deaf Football Challenge Cup to the North East for the first time in its history

== Awards ==
In recognition of his work, Garthwaite was awarded the North East regional Sound Barrier Stars top award for his culinary talent and inspiration to his community for his work on screen as Punk Chef in 2013, also he was selected to compete in the finals to representing England at International Gastronomy Deaf Culinary Event in Copenhagen, Denmark as part of an eight-man shortlist in 2014, then the following year 2015 he was selected once again and he was awarded the second place at the International Gastronomy Deaf Culinary Event after walking away empty-handed in 2014.

== Television ==
Cooking series
Year	Title	Type	Notes
2012	Punk Chef: Pilot	Food programme	Punk Chef helps the Durant family cook healthy food and lose weight.
2013	Punk Chef series: (6 episodes)	Food programme	Punk Chef is back with a mission - to get the Deaf community cooking better.
2014	Punk Chef: Kids challenge (2 episodes)	Food programme	Four teams compete for the Young Punk Chef title.
2015	BBC: See Hear Christmas special	Deaf magazine programme	Clive Mason meets Scott Garthwaite, a world-leading Deaf chef, to learn some festive seasonal recipes
2017	BSL Zone's Up For It	BSL Zone kids	What can our amazing young Deaf chef whip up?
2018	Punk Chef On the Road: Pilot	Food Travel programme	Scott Garthwaite travels around North East England, meeting people and cooking mouthwatering food.
2019	Punk Chef On the Road (10 episodes)	Food Travel series	Pioneering Chef Scott Garthwaite returns to finish off his culinary journey around Britain with his sidekick interpreter Danny Rose.
