= The Sheriffs Are Coming =

British documentary television series

- Series 6 title card
- Genre: Factual
- Starring: Luke Peacock; Grant Bailey-Rodriguez; Ben Dirom; Myles Whitworth; James King; Mark King
- Narrated by: Paul Sangam (Series 1); James Barriscale (Series 2); David Reed (Series 3—)
- Country of origin: United Kingdom
- Original language: English
- No. of series: 9
- No. of episodes: 80 (main series); 59 (compilations) (list of episodes)

Production
- Production location: United Kingdom
- Running time: 30 minutes (compilations); 45 minutes (daytime); 60 minutes (primetime)
- Production company: Screenchannel Television

Original release
- Network: BBC One; BBC One HD
- Release: 19 March 2012 – 2021

The Sheriffs Are Coming is a British television fly on the wall documentary series, broadcast on BBC One, that follows the work of High Court enforcement officers (HCEOs) from David Carter, Peter Watt and Michael Aynsley of The Sheriffs Office. The first series, containing ten episodes, commenced on 19 March 2012. Nine seasons have aired as of 2021. As well as eight daytime series, six hour-long prime time series have been broadcast, compiling footage from episodes from the parent series. On 5 February 2014, The Sheriffs Are Coming was announced as the winner of the Best Daytime Programme at the Broadcast Awards 2014.

== Basis ==
High Court enforcement officers (HCEOs) act under High Court writs and they operate within England and Wales. County Court judgements and awards with a value of £600 and above made in the County Court can be transferred to the High Court for enforcement for a court fee of £66. If enforcement is successful, the court fee is recoverable from the judgement debtor, along with the original debt, judgement interest and enforcement costs. If unsuccessful, all the claimant pays is a £75 plus VAT compliance stage fee (referred to as an admin fee in the programme). In the case of Employment Tribunal and Advisory, Conciliation and Arbitration Service (ACAS) awards, there is no minimum value before a claimant can use an HCEO.

HCEOs can enforce County Court judgements when the claimant has instructed them to transfer the judgement to the High Court making it a writ. Judgements can include Employment Tribunal awards, ACAS settlements and foreign judgements where the judgement debtor is based in England or Wales. Part 3 of the Tribunals, Courts and Enforcement Act 2007 was implemented in April 2014. The new regulations include a requirement to send a seven-day notice of enforcement to judgement debtors, an increase in the time delay between seizure and sale and how peaceable entry may be effected. There has also been reform of fees charged by HCEOs.

== Broadcast ==
The first series began on 19 March 2012 with a team of Sheriffs from The Sheriffs Office, containing a total of ten episodes. A second series continuing with a team from The Sheriffs Office, contained fifteen episodes which aired daily (on weekdays) from 14 January to 1 February 2013 at 11:00am. Following their broadcast, each episode would be repeated the following morning at 7:00am on BBC Two. The first prime-time series broadcast during the Summer of 2013. A total of four episodes, containing highlights from the first and second series, broadcast at 7:00pm between 22 and 31 July, being shown on both Mondays and Wednesdays. The third series, again reducing to ten episodes, aired daily (on weekdays) from 13 to 24 January 2014. Once again, each episode would be repeated the following morning at 7:00am on BBC Two.

A second prime-time series followed in Summer 2014, containing highlights from Series 3. Again, four episodes broadcast at 7:00pm between 4 and 14 August, again being shown on Mondays and Wednesdays. A fourth series with The Sheriffs Office, containing just five episodes, the shortest of any series yet, aired daily between 16 and 20 March 2015. This was followed by the first series of the half-hour reversions, containing highlights from the first three series. These aired daily (on weekdays) from 23 March to 17 April 2015. A third prime-time series following in Summer 2015, containing highlights from Series 4. Three episodes broadcast weekly at 7:00pm on Wednesday evenings from 22 July 2015. The fifth series, again increasing to ten episodes and with a team of Sheriffs from The Sheriffs Office, aired daily from 11 to 24 April 2016. Again, each episode was repeated the following day at 6:45am on BBC Two.

The second series of half-hour reversions aired from 17 to 27 October 2016. The fourth prime-time series followed in January 2017, containing six episodes. These were broadcast weekly from 4 January to 8 February 2017, airing at 8:00pm on Wednesdays. The sixth series aired daily (on weekdays) from 3 to 14 April 2017, again at 11:00am. Again, each episode was repeated the next morning at 6:30am on BBC Two. The fifth prime-time series followed in July 2017, containing just three episodes. These were broadcast from 13 July to 23 August, again at 8:00pm on Wednesdays. The third series of half-hour reversions, containing highlights from the sixth series, aired daily (on weekdays) from 20 November to 1 December 2017. The seventh series, which commenced filming in October, aired on BBC One from 12 March 2018.

The ninth series aired with a new team of Enforcement Agents from Frank G Whitworth, High Court Enforcement who form part of Enforcement Bailiffs Ltd on 31 May 2021. Ten 45-minute episodes were shown on BBC One every weekday at 11:00am until the final episode of the series aired on Friday 11 June 2021.

== Transmissions ==
=== Main series ===
Series	Start date	End date	Episodes
1	19 March 2012	30 March 2012	10
2	14 January 2013	1 February 2013	15
3	13 January 2014	24 January 2014	10
4	16 March 2015	20 March 2015	5
5	11 April 2016	24 April 2016	10
6	3 April 2017	14 April 2017	10
7	12 March 2018	23 March 2018	10
8	25 March 2019	5 April 2019	10
9	31 May 2021	11 June 2021	10

=== Hour long reversions ===
Series	Start date	End date	Episodes	Material from
1	22 July 2013	31 July 2013	4	Series 1 & 2
2	4 August 2014	14 August 2014	4	Series 3
3	22 July 2015	5 August 2015	3	Series 4
4	4 January 2017	8 February 2017	6	Series 5
5	13 July 2017	23 August 2017	3	Series 6

=== Half hour reversions ===
Series	Start date	End date	Episodes	Material from
1	23 March 2015	17 April 2015	20	Series 1, 2 & 3
2	17 October 2016	27 October 2016	9	Series 5
3	20 November 2017	1 December 2017	10	Series 6

== Cast ==
=== Current cast ===
- Ben Dirom
- Grant Bailey-Rodriguez
- James King
- Luke Peacock
- Mark King
- Myles Whitworth

=== Former cast ===
- Lawrence Grix
- Kevin 'Kev' McNally
- Tommy Coyle
- Gerald Anderson
- Robert Foster
- Jess Paton
- Jamie Wykes
- Mike Perkins
- Jon Farley
- Adam Crossley
- Tracey Lee
- Billy Evans
- Andrew "Andy" Joryeff
- Adrian "Ady" Long
- Dave Steele
- Craig Wild
- Ken Warby
- Alan Pennington
- Chris Pearson
- Marc Newton
- Tony Smith
- Daryll Oreton
- Mark Povey
- Pete Spencer
- Dave Crabtree
- Dave Woodcock
- Steve Hockborn

== See also ==
- Can't Pay? We'll Take It Away!
