= Is This Rape?: Sex on Trial =

Television programme

Is This Rape?: Sex on Trial was a BBC3 television programme, aired in 2015.

A group of teenagers, male and female, were housed for two days examining and discussing a fictional film. There was criticism that it was asking onlookers to vote on whether it was rape. It also received praise for raising the issue of consent.
