= Rich House Poor House =

British television documentary series

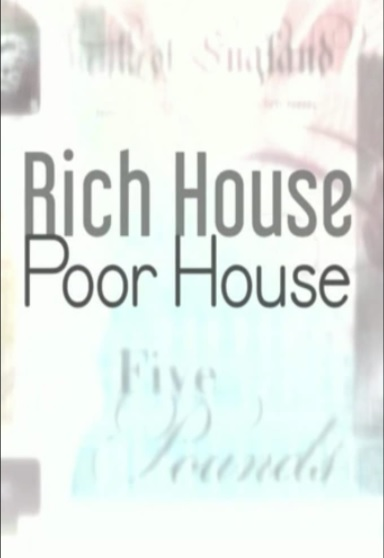
- Genre: Documentary
- Written by: Claire Collinson-Jones
- Starring: Craig Kelly, Adam Stott
- Theme music composer: Gil Cang, Malachi Lillitos
- Country of origin: United Kingdom
- Original language: English
- No. of series: 12
- No. of episodes: 79

Production
- Producer: Claire Collinson-Jones
- Cinematography: Shayan Scott
- Running time: 56 mins; 90 mins (10 episodes)
- Production companies: Hat Trick Productions; Emporium Productions

Original release
- Network: Channel 5
- Release: 30 March 2017 – present

Rich House Poor House is a British television documentary programme starring Craig Kelly, Adam Stott and others. The programme is directed by Danny Fildes, Marcus English, Simon Bowyer and others. The first episode was aired on 30 March 2017. The airing network is Channel 5. As of October 2026, twelve series have been broadcast.

The programme is created and produced by Claire Collinson-Jones, Emma Read, Jon Durbridge, David Emerson and others under Hat Trick Productions. By August 2020 it had become a co-production with Hat Trick's sister company, Emporium Productions.

== Format ==
Two families from completely opposite ends of the financial spectrum and class divide swap homes, budgets and social status for seven days to discover how the other side lives.

== Contributors ==
- Craig Kelly (as Self - Narrator)
- Adam Stott
- Henna Dolk Viksten

== Direction ==
The different episodes of the series are directed by different directors such as

- Danny Fildes (14 episodes, 2017–2018)
- Marcus English (4 episodes, 2017)
- Simon Bowyer (4 episodes, 2019–2020)

== Production ==
Twelve series were made between 2017 and 2026, comprising 69 one-hour episodes and ten 90-minute episodes. Hat Trick International said in August 2020 that the format had been sold to broadcasters in Finland, Germany, the Netherlands and Poland, and that the original series would be shown in more than 109 countries.

The different episodes of the series are produced by different producers such as:

- Claire Collinson-Jones, executive producer (21 episodes, 2017–2018)
- Emma Read, executive producer (14 episodes, 2019–2021)
- Jon Durbridge, executive producer / series editor (13 episodes, 2017–2018)
- David Emerson, executive producer (12 episodes, 2019–2020)
- Kate Roberts, series producer (12 episodes, 2019–2020)
- Simon Greenwood, series producer (11 episodes, 2019–2021)
- Annabel Walker, line producer (10 episodes, 2019–2020)

== Spin-offs ==
Channel 5 commissioned a spin-off, Rich Holiday Poor Holiday; by August 2020 ten episodes had been made and six more commissioned for a second series. Six one-hour Rich House Poor House Changed My Life specials, made by Emporium Productions, return to families from earlier series a year after their swap. Rich House Poor House USA, a 2026 Emporium production for Channel 5, has eight 90-minute episodes in which a British family and an American family from opposite ends of the wealth divide swap homes and budgets for a week.
