= Platform Post-production =

Platform is a London-based post-production company established in 2001. Starting out as an editing house for children and sports programmes, the Soho-based facility now covers a variety of long-form and short-form projects in broadcast and advertising with its services offering audio, online editing, grading, visual effects and graphics.

The creative team at Platform is led by managing director Jo Beighton, appointed in the summer of 2017 after a period of consultancy.

== History ==
Platform was founded in 2001 by creative director and graphic designer David Tasker and editor Simon Cruse.

In 2008 VFX editor and colourist John Cryer from The Joint joined Platform investing a share of the company and contributing high-end visual effects to Platform's creative offering. This kick started Platform's commercial presence, diversifying the company's client base and ensured the company's ability to take on graphic and VFX heavy projects.

Platform has undergone expansion of the facility in Soho to broaden its range of genres, which has seen it grow from a three-suite outfit into a hub of twenty-four operational area offering 12 Avid suites, 3 studios, 4 flames suites and a grading suite with Baselight.
