= Ross Kemp: Behind the Story =

UK television series

- Genre: Chat show
- Presented by: Dermot Murnaghan
- Starring: Ross Kemp
- Country of origin: United Kingdom
- Original language: English
- No. of series: 1
- No. of episodes: 3

Production
- Running time: 60 minutes (inc. adverts)
- Production companies: Tiger Aspect Productions and Mongoose Productions

Original release
- Network: Sky1
- Release: 27 October – 10 November 2009

Related
- Ross Kemp in Search of Pirates; Ross Kemp in the Middle East

Ross Kemp: Behind the Story is a three-part documentary series broadcast on Sky1 in 2009. Dermot Murnaghan interviews Ross Kemp, a soap opera actor in EastEnders who became a presenter of "danger documentaries". He discusses his experience in filming Ross Kemp in Afghanistan and Ross Kemp on Gangs.
