= Ross Kemp on Gangs =

2004 British documentary TV series

- Genre: Documentary
- Starring: Ross Kemp
- Country of origin: United Kingdom
- Original language: English
- No. of seasons: 4
- No. of episodes: 20 (list of episodes)

Production
- Executive producers: Ross Kemp; Clive Tulloh
- Producer: Matt Bennett
- Production location: United Kingdom
- Running time: 60 minutes
- Production companies: Tiger Aspect Productions; Endemol UK

Original release
- Network: Sky One
- Release: 21 September 2004 – 6 January 2009

Ross Kemp on Gangs is a documentary series that was broadcast on Sky 1 from 21 September 2004, until 6 January 2009. Hosted by actor Ross Kemp, the series follows Kemp and a film crew around the world as they interview members of gangs, locals who have been affected by gang violence, and the authorities who are attempting to combat the problem. Kemp then tries to establish contact within the gangs in an attempt to talk to their leader. A total of four series were filmed, three of which have since been released on DVD. On 20 May 2007, the series won a BAFTA award for best factual series.

== Production ==
The first series featured Kemp investigating gangs and police corruption in Brazil, Māori gangs in New Zealand, neo-Nazi skinheads in California and gangsters in London. The second series featured "MS13" from El Salvador, neo-Nazis in Russia, football hooligans in Poland, American "Bloods" and "Crips" gangs in St. Louis, and the Numbers Gang in South Africa.

In the third series, Kemp travelled to Kingston, Jamaica, where gangs engage in bloody turf war; Poland, where football hooligans have become some of the most feared gangs in Europe; Colombia, where Kemp meets the people involved in bitter guerrilla fighting – including the most secretive of them all, the Sicarios; and travels to East Timor to meet the Sacred Heart and Seven Seven, two gangs in the midst of a deadly conflict.

In the fourth series, Kemp travelled to the Los Angeles district of Compton, to a neighbourhood where a famously hazardous scene was filmed, in which gangland junior Matt 'Malicious' Ward misfired his gun in a rival gang's neighbourhood. Kemp travelled to Bulgaria to investigate Roma gangs and Neo-Nazi Skinheads; Belize, where the focus was cocaine trafficking; and Liverpool, where Kemp met gangs in Norris Green and Croxteth.

In early 2007, Kemp published his experiences from the programme in a book of the same name. A second book was published in April 2009. In early 2009, the series aired in the United States on the Investigation Discovery channel under the title Gang Nation.

== Episode list ==
=== Series 1 (2004-2006) ===
No. overall	No. in series	Title	Original release date	UK viewers (millions)
1	1	"United States of America"	21 September 2004	N/A
Ross travels to America to investigate their obsession with firearms. This episode was originally titled Lethal Attraction: Why Americans Love Guns, and on repeat broadcasts carried the title Why Americans Love Guns: An Inspiration for ‘Ross Kemp On Gangs’.
2	2	"Rio de Janeiro"	5 June 2005	0.55
Ross travels to Rio de Janeiro to examine the war waging not only between the authorities and the drugs trade, but the rival gangs that are locked in bitter feuds for control of the slums. Ross travels into troubled regions of the city to uncover how far things have gone and if there is any way back. In the process Ross discovers the extent of inequality in Brazil's society.
3	3	"New Zealand"	12 June 2005	0.68
Ross explores the violent underworld beneath the rolling hills and sweeping valleys of one of the most beautiful countries on Earth. He examines the Mongrel Mob, who are responsible for countless violent assaults.
4	4	"Orange County"	19 June 2005	0.60
Ross gets to grips with the impact of the Orange County Skinheads on a concerned community in Orange County, California, regarded as the birthplace of American skinheads. The recent amalgamation of various factions has led to violent disruption.
5	5	"London"	16 April 2006	N/A
Ross visits London to investigate the multicultural society that breeds international organised crime. Ross also speaks to ethnic minorities that feel they are alienated by society and the system.

=== Series 2 (2006-2007) ===
No. overall	No. in series	Title	Original release date	UK viewers (millions)
6	1	"El Salvador"	22 October 2006	N/A
Ross travels to El Salvador to meet the "most dangerous gang in the world", MS13 (Mara Salvatrucha), a gang started by migrant Salvadoran youths in urban Los Angeles. In a country with a population smaller than London, there are over 800 murders a year, and MS13 manages to boast over 100,000 members worldwide.
7	2	"St. Louis"	29 October 2006	N/A
Ross examines Middle America’s gang culture with a visit to St. Louis, Missouri, where he discovers the average gun statistics for an average Midwestern town, and takes a look at how this municipality, with a population of 342,000 people, holds around 380,000 guns, with the majority being in the hands of gangs which rule the streets.
8	3	"Moscow"	5 November 2006	0.59
Ross lands in Moscow to see if brutal gangs of Neo-Nazis are behind an alarming increase in the amount of racist attacks and hate crimes. He joins one Neo-Nazi group during their training scheme, and puts himself through a series of tests, including being set on fire. He soon discovers the extent of power that these gangs are starting to gain.
9	4	"Cape Town"	15 November 2006	N/A
Ross explores South Africa's ferocious Numbers Gang, which thrives in the country's overcrowded prisons. Nowhere is their power more potent than Cape Town's Pollsmoor High Security Prison, and here, Ross learns the fearsome power of the Numbers, who subject new arrivals to violent attacks and gang rapes as part of their brutal initiations.
10	5	"South London"	15 December 2006	N/A
Ross visits Peckham and Brixton following the recent spate of gang related incidents in London, and speaks to some of the most notorious gangs, including the Peckham boys and Cripset (South London Crips). However, it's not long before he finds himself caught in the middle of a turf war between two rival gangs.

=== Series 3 (2007) ===
No. overall	No. in series	Title	Original release date	UK viewers (millions)
11	1	"Jamaica"	1 October 2007	0.56
Ross travels to Kingston, Jamaica, the murder capital of the world, where gangs historically aligned to Jamaica's two political parties. Ross discovers the gangs have moved away from their political roots and now engage in a bloody turf war, funded by drugs and driven by tit-for-tat reprisals, that has spawned an entirely new generation of violence.
12	2	"Poland"	8 October 2007	0.66
Ross travels to Poland to visit the Polish football hooligans who have become some of the most feared gangs in Europe. In Kraków, he watches a match between Wisła and Lech Poznań at the stadium, and then observes a pre-match battle between Cracovia fans from the perspective of the police squad. He also travels to Gorzów in the west of the country to meet with fans of Stilon, playing in the regional league.
13	3	"Colombia"	15 October 2007	0.42
Ross visits Colombia, a country ravaged by war and synonymous with drugs and violence. He meets the people involved in the long and bitter guerrilla fighting - including the most secretive of them all, the Sicarios. These small groups, mostly under the employ of the paramilitaries, operate as 'hit-squads', killing whoever is considered a threat.
14	4	"East Timor"	22 October 2007	N/A
Ross visits East Timor, where more than two-thirds of East Timorese youth are believed to be involved in gangs, ranging from martial arts groups to cult-like animist gangs. In the barrios of downtown Dili, Ross meets two gangs in the midst of a deadly conflict, and witnesses their bizarre rituals, strict training and terrifying arsenal.

=== Series 4 (2008-2009) ===
No. overall	No. in series	Title	Original release date	UK viewers (millions)
15	1	"Los Angeles, California"	1 September 2008	N/A
Ross travels to Los Angeles, California to interview the Crips and the Bloods in the areas of Compton, described as the "gang capital of the world" by its own mayor, with over 1,000 gangs and 100,000 gang members. Ross also investigates the fight between African American and Latino gang members.
16	2	"Bulgaria"	8 September 2008	N/A
Ross travels to Sofia and Plovdiv, to explore the secretive world of Bulgaria’s gangs. He joins Roma families to understand what it means to be a member of a Gypsy gang – reportedly involved in people trafficking, the sex trade and pick pocketing. He also speaks to a group of Neo-Nazi Skinheads battling for control of the city's streets.
17	3	"Belize"	15 September 2008	0.44
Ross investigates unemployment and a rampant drugs trade in Belize, where gangs are battling a turf war in the slums. Ross meets the gangs that control the streets and is shown some of the latest weapons that make the city so violent, including grenades and high explosives.
18	4	"Kenya"	22 September 2008	0.65
Extended episode. Ross travels to Kenya to investigate the Mungiki, an outfit labelled as the most dangerous "gang" in Africa. The secretive sect is regarded not only as one of the world’s most dangerous gangs, but also the perpetrators of a gruesome campaign of violence, including beheading and torture.
19	5	"The Glue Kids of Kenya"	22 September 2008	N/A
Special half-hour episode. Ross returns to Kenya four months after visiting the country on the trail of the Mungiki gang, and returns to the town of Eldoret, where an entire community of children was left orphaned by the recent political violence, forcing them to scavenge from rubbish dumps and engage in solvent abuse.
20	6	"Liverpool"	6 January 2009	N/A
Ross heads to Liverpool to investigate the increasing number of incidents relating to the street gangs of Norris Green and Croxteth. For legal reasons, broadcast of this programme was delayed from its original broadcast date of 22 September 2008 until 6 January 2009 due to the Rhys Jones murder trial.

== Home media ==
Series	Year	# of episodes	Release dates	Notes
Series 1	2004-2006	5	N/A	The first series has never been released on DVD.
Series 2	2006-2007	5	4 February 2008	Contains four episodes from the second series. Does not contain the South London episode.
Series 3	2007	4	6 October 2008	Contains all four episodes from the third series.
Series 4	2008-2009	6	19 October 2009	Contains five episodes from the fourth series. Does not contain the Liverpool episode.

== See also ==
- Ross Kemp In Afghanistan – shadows the first battalion Royal Anglians and offers insight into life on the front line with unprecedented access.
- The Impressions Show with Culshaw and Stephenson – a sketch usually featured at the end of the show.
- in Afghanistan – 2008–2012
- in Search of Pirates – 2009
- Battle for the Amazon – 2010
- Ross Kemp: Extreme World – 2011-2017.
