= Barbie MacLaurin =

British Documentary Director

Barbie MacLaurin (born 1964) is an Emmy award-winning, BAFTA nominated British Documentary Director.

== Director ==
MacLaurin started directing on the BBC's Holiday and Airport television series'. Thereafter, she filmed several documentaries including Final Chance to Save Tigers. In 2008 MacLaurin was nominated for two awards for her work on Paul Merton in China. Her recent work includes Richard E. Grant's Hotel Secrets for Sky Atlantic, The Drug Trial: Emergency at the Hospital for the BBC which was nominated for a Grierson and won Feature of the Year at the Medical Journalist Awards 2017, and The Abused, a feature-length documentary for Channel 5 which was nominated for a BAFTA,British Academy Television Award for Best Single Documentary and won Best Documentary at the Edinburgh TV Festival 2019. Her latest feature doc Queen of Speed for Sky Docs, won an International Emmy for Best Sports Documentary 2022,International Emmy Award for Best Sports Documentary.

== Filmography ==
Year	Film/Programme	Credit
1998–2004	Holiday	Director - Numerous
2001–2002	Airport	Director - 3 episodes
2002	SAS: Are You Tough Enough? Series one	Director - 3 episodes
2003	No Going Back	Director - 2 episodes
2005	Peaches Geldof: Teenage Mind	Director
2006	Final Chance to Save: Tigers with Sanjeev Bhaskar	Writer and Director
2007	Paul Merton in China	Director - 4 Episodes
2008	Dangerous Jobs for Girls	Producer and Director - Episode 1
2008	Transvestite Wives	Director
2009–2011	Banged Up Abroad	Director - 5 episodes
2010	Martin Clunes:Islands of Britain - The North	Producer and Director - Episode 1
2011	Taking On Tyson	Director - 2 episodes
2012	Chris Tarrant: Extreme Railways	Director - 1 episode
2012	Married to the Moonies	Producer and Director
2014	Richard E. Grant's Hotel Secrets	Producer and Director - 3 episodes
2014	The Gift	Director - 2 episodes
2016	Women in Prison	Director - 2 episodes
2017	The Drug Trial: Emergency at the Hospital	Writer, Director and Producer
2018	Breaking Bad in Britain	Writer and Director
2019	The Abused	Director and Producer
2021	Queen of Speed	Writer and Director

== Awards and nominations ==
- 2008: Nominated for the British Academy Television Award for Best Factual Series or Strand with Paul Sommers, Mark Chapman and Paul Merton for Paul Merton in China.
- 2008: Nominated for a Broadcast Award for Paul Merton in China.
- 2017: Winner Feature of the Year, Medical Journalist Awards for The Drug Trial: Emergency at the Hospital
- 2017: Nominated Best Science Documentary, Grierson Awards for The Drug Trial: Emergency at the Hospital
- 2018: Winner Best Science Program, Banff Awards for The Drug Trial: Emergency at the Hospital
- 2018: Nominated Best Documentary, Broadcast Awards for The Drug Trial: Emergency at the Hospital
- 2019: Winner Best Documentary, Edinburgh Festival TV Awards for The Abused
- 2019: Winner Best Domestic Affairs, International Broadcasters Awards for The Abused
- 2020: Nominated Best Single Documentary, BAFTA for The Abused,British Academy Television Award for Best Single Documentary
- 2020: Nominated Best Documentary, Broadcast Awards for The Abused
- 2022: Winner Best Sports Documentary, International Emmys for Queen of Speed
