= A Line in the Sand (TV series) =

- Genre: Thriller
- Based on: A Line in the Sand by Gerald Seymour
- Written by: Gerald Seymour
- Directed by: James Hawes
- Starring: Ross Kemp; Saskia Reeves; Mark Bazeley; Vincent Franklin; Ralph Ineson; James Puddephatt; Sean McKenzie; Katy Cavanagh; Kayvan Novak
- Composer: John E. Keane
- Country of origin: United Kingdom
- Original language: English
- No. of series: 1
- No. of episodes: 2

Production
- Executive producers: Michele Buck; Tim Vaughan
- Producer: Chris Kelly
- Cinematography: James Aspinall
- Editor: Charles Alexander
- Running time: 90 minutes (w/advertisements)
- Production companies: Anglia Television; Meridian Television

Original release
- Network: ITV
- Release: 7 June – 8 June 2004

A Line in the Sand is a two-part British television miniseries, adapted by Gerald Seymour from his 1999 novel of the same name, that first broadcast on ITV on 7 June 2004. The series, directed by James Hawes, stars Ross Kemp as Frank Parry, a former MI6 spy who tries to escape his past by hiding out in a remote village on the Suffolk coast. The series was originally scheduled for broadcast in September 2001, but was later shelved until June 2004, due to a major plotline which involved Middle-Eastern terrorists, which was deemed to be too sensitive following the 9/11 terror attacks in the United States earlier that month.

For some international broadcasts, the series was broadcast as one feature-length film. In the United States, the series aired two years prior to the UK premiere, airing on 18 June 2002. The series was released on DVD via ITV Studios on 15 January 2007. The series is notable for featuring a very early role for Danny Mac, before his casting as Dodger Savage in Hollyoaks.

== Plot ==
In a remote village on the Suffolk coast, Frank Parry (Ross Kemp) waits for his past to catch up with him. A former spy for MI6, Perry was based in Iran watching their chemical and biological weapons programme, but he decides to go straight, giving up the names of his high-level Middle-Eastern contacts in exchange for immunity from the government. The information he brought back led to the deaths of many Iranian scientists and seriously undermined the progress of the weapons programme. When his old business partners catch wind of the situation, they want revenge. Now Iran has dispatched its most deadly assassin to complete the task. Code-named 'The Anvil', he will find Perry, unless Perry's protectors can reach him first.

== Critical reception ==
Robert Pardi of TV Guide said of the series; "Engrossing in a middlebrow sort of way, this straightforward thriller, originally broadcast on British television in 2001, confirms one's worst suspicions about the heartlessness of all governments. Screenwriter Gerald Seymour gets a little too wrapped up in the mechanics of the espionage plot to lend the hero's plight much suspense, but the timely subject matter does add extra heft to a film that's caught somewhere between provocative political melodrama and standard action bash."

Many also noted at the time of broadcast that Kemp's character in the series was very similar to that of his Ultimate Force character Henry "Henno" Garvie. Kemp later revealed that it was his performance in A Line in the Sand which earned him the part of Henno.

== Cast ==
- Ross Kemp as Gavin Hughes/Frank Parry; former MI6
- Saskia Reeves as Meryl Rodgers, Gavin's girlfriend
- Mark Bazeley as DI Geoff Markham; Gavin's liaison agent
- Vincent Franklin as Sammy Cargill; one of Gavin's former associates
- Ralph Ineson as DS Bill Davies; Markham's sidekick
- James Puddephatt as PC Dave Rankin; one of Gavin's guards
- Sean McKenzie as PC Joe Paget; another of Gavin's guards
- Katy Cavanagh as Leanne Mitchell; Gavin's ex-girlfriend
- Kayvan Novak as Vahid "The Anvil"; a marksman sent to kill Gavin
- Danny Mac as Tom Westwick (Aged 10)
- Jake Greene as Tom Westwick
- Rupert Procter as Andy Chalmers
- Lesley McGuire as Janice Hughes

== Episodes ==
#	Title	Directed by	Written by	Airdate	Viewers (millions)
1	"Episode 1"	James Hawes	Gerald Seymour	7 June 2004	5.45
English farm equipment sales rep Gavin Hughes has come to regret his decision to sell his Iranians buyers machinery that can then be converted into armaments. Cornered by Her Majesty's Secret Service, Hughes agrees to spy on his customers. Tragically, the information he gives them leads the bombing of a busload of Iranian scientists, many of whom had befriended Hughes. Withholding the true facts of the incident, the British government insists that Hughes change his identity; his acquiescence costs him his wife and son, who refuse to accompany him into a witness protection program. What Hughes doesn't realize is that resentful Iranian terrorists are now biding their time, waiting to exact their revenge. Now known as Frank Parry, Hughes starts to build a new life for himself with Meryl Rogers and her child, but when he hears a radio report about his own son contracting meningitis, Hughes blows his cover and rushes to the hospital.
2	"Episode 2"	James Hawes	Gerald Seymour	8 June 2004	4.49
Liaison agent Geoff Markham warns Hughes that he's a wanted man, but when Hughes refuses to run for a second time, the government balks about babysitting him. Meanwhile, the Iranian terrorists have sent their top assassin to England. Having drawn the proverbial line in the sand, Hughes jeopardizes his new family's safety, as Markham scrambles to ward off Iranian retribution. Suddenly, Hughes finds the straight and narrow to be more dangerous than his former life of crime.
