= Ross Kemp: Extreme World series 3 =

Season of television series

Ross Kemp: Extreme World
- Season 3
- Series Three title cards
- Starring: Ross Kemp
- No. of episodes: 6

Release
- Original network: Sky One
- Original release: 21 January – 25 February 2014

Series chronology
- ← Previous; Series 2 Next → Series 4

The third series of Ross Kemp: Extreme World, a British documentary series, was broadcast on Sky 1 from 21 January and finished on 25 February 2014. Kemp examined the conflicts in Northern Ireland, poverty and corruption in Las Vegas, the crack epidemic in Rio de Janeiro and India's sex-trafficking industry.

== Episodes ==
No. overall	No. in series	Title	Original release date	UK viewers (millions)
1	12	"India"	21 January 2014	0.46m
Kemp travels to India to investigate the sex trade, where girls as young as nine are being trafficked from some of the country's poorest slums to the richest cities. He meets up with a detective who is trying to combat the problem of prostitution, and speaks with a trafficker who claims to have murdered more than 400 young women.
2	13	"Papua New Guinea"	28 January 2014	0.59m
Kemp travels to Papua New Guinea to investigate the violence, rape, murder and torture that occur daily on the country's streets. He meets with members of rival tribes in an attempt to find out whether age-old historical rivalries are still fresh today, and speaks with doctors in one of the country's busiest trauma units.
3	14	"Northern Ireland"	4 February 2014	0.82m
Kemp heads to Belfast during the July Marching Season, where tension between the Loyalist and Republican communities has reached an all time high. He looks at the rise of the 'New IRA', questions the effectiveness of the Good Friday Agreement, and heads out on to the streets with the PSNI as they police the yearly march through Ardoyne.
4	15	"Lebanon"	11 February 2014	0.57m
Kemp travels to Lebanon to investigate the increasing tensions between the Sunnis and the Alawites, as conflict between the two allegiances begins to mirror the war in Syria. He speaks with members of both factions, visits an arms dealer and discovers the aftermath of a series of car bomb attacks that have resulted in multiple deaths.
5	16	"Las Vegas"	18 February 2014	0.58m
Kemp investigates the increasing problem of homelessness and gambling addiction in Las Vegas, speaking with families who have made their home in one of the many flood tunnels built underneath the capital's streets. Later, he speaks to those who engage in the ever-growing trend of begging for money in order to buy heroin.
6	17	"Rio de Janeiro"	25 February 2014	0.67m
Kemp takes a look at the growing problem of crack addiction in some of Rio's poorest slums, involving children as young as eleven years old, as well as the sale of illegal arms and the increasing number of gangs operating on the streets, just as the country prepares to take on both the 2014 FIFA World Cup and 2016 Olympic Games.

== Ratings ==
Episode	Date	Official Sky One rating (In millions)	Sky One weekly rank	Total Sky One viewers
Episode 1	21 January 2014	0.46	N/A	N/A
Episode 2	28 January 2014	0.59	N/A	N/A
Episode 3	4 February 2014	0.82	N/A	N/A
Episode 4	11 February 2014	0.57	N/A	N/A
Episode 5	18 February 2014	0.58	N/A	N/A
Episode 6	25 February 2014	0.67	N/A	N/A
Series average				
