= Paul Merton's Adventures =

- Genre: Comedy
- Presented by: Paul Merton
- Narrated by: Paul Merton
- Country of origin: United Kingdom
- Original language: English
- No. of series: 1
- No. of episodes: 6

Production
- Running time: 60 minutes (inc. adverts)
- Production company: Tiger Aspect Productions

Original release
- Network: Channel 5
- Release: 19 October – 23 November 2011

Related
- Paul Merton in Europe

Paul Merton's Adventures is a comedy series that was broadcast on the British television channel Channel 5 in October and November 2011. It starred the British comedian Paul Merton along with Peter Anderson and Stephen Frost. The series has six episodes, each based on a type of holiday.

== Scenario ==
Merton keeps his comically critical attitude while sampling some popular holiday types that never appealed to him, unlike millions of Britons. They range from cruises and "extreme" holidays overseas (Ibiza, Florida) to English coastal resorts and adventurous Scotland.

== Episodes ==
No.	Title	Original release date
1	"On a Cruise"	19 October 2011
Merton goes aboard the biggest cruise ship in the world.
2	"In Ibiza"	26 October 2011
Merton visits the hedonistic party island of Ibiza, where he takes part in an animal-themed party and is given some fashion tips from a transsexual.
3	"In Florida"	2 November 2011
Merton is in Florida, where he visits a spiritualist community and becomes an ambassador for a peculiar republic.
4	"Caravan"	9 November 2011
Merton remains in the UK, revisiting some holiday destinations of his youth and other quirky spots as he joins one of the largest clubs of people in the country – caravanners.
5	"The Alps"	16 November 2011
Merton visits the Alps, where he has his mind, body and soul tuned up at a range of spas and retreats in the mountains.
6	"Scotland"	23 November 2011
Merton samples some adrenaline-fuelled activities and idiosyncratic adventures in Scotland.
