= Ross Kemp =

English actor and journalist (born 1964)

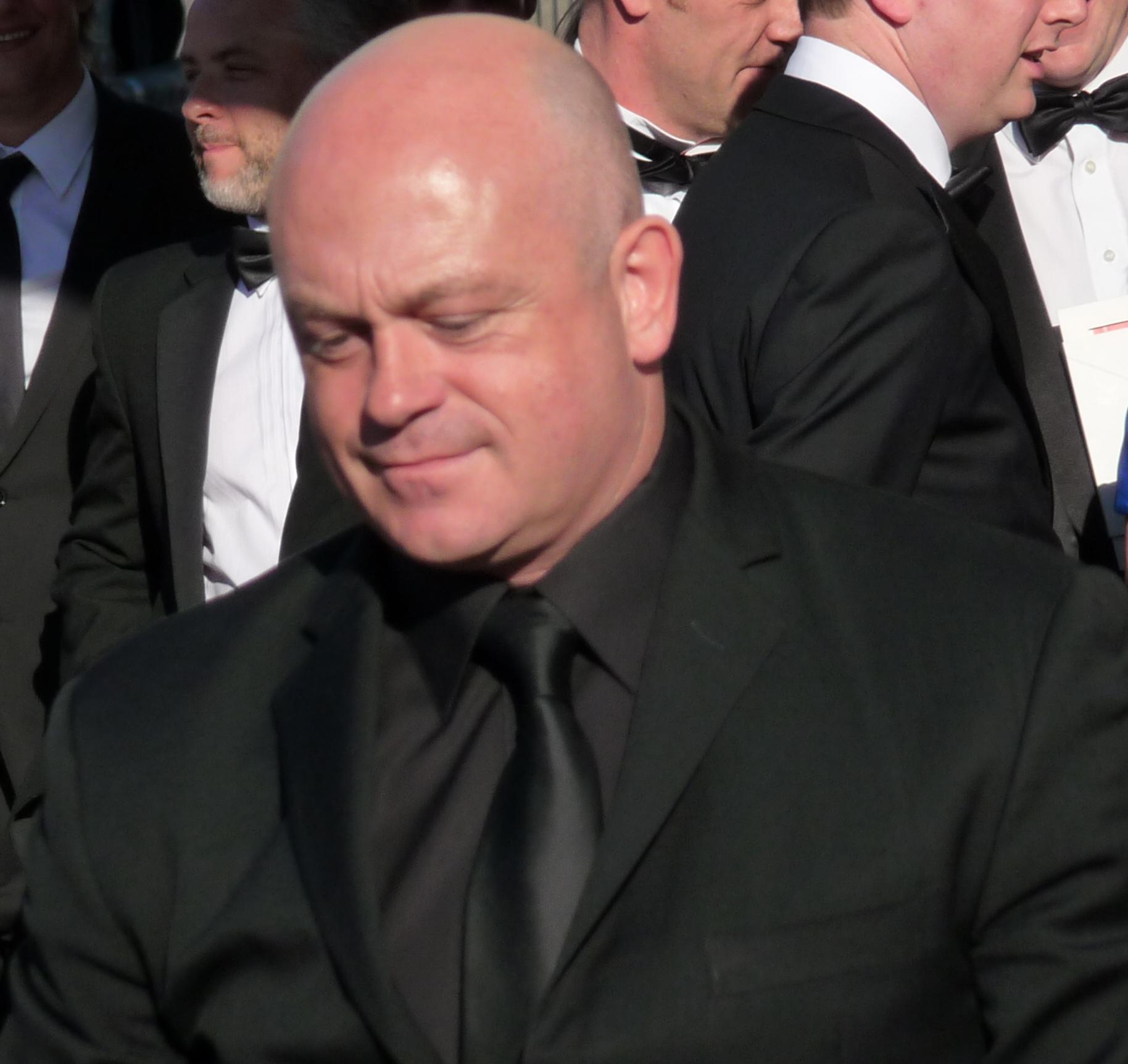
- Kemp at the 2009 BAFTA Awards
- Born: Ross James Kemp; 21 July 1964 (age 62); Barking, Essex, England
- Occupations: Actor; author; presenter; reporter
- Years active: 1985–present
- Spouses: Rebekah Wade (m. 2002; div. 2009); Renee O'Brien (m. 2012)
- Children: 4

Ross James Kemp (born 21 July 1964) is an English actor, author, reporter and television presenter. He rose to prominence in the role of Grant Mitchell in the BBC soap opera EastEnders. His other roles include Graham Lodsworth in Emmerdale and Detective Inspector Monk in Birds of a Feather. Kemp presented the BAFTA Award–winning documentary television series Ross Kemp on Gangs (2004–2009).

== Early life ==
Kemp was born on 21 July 1964 in Barking, Essex. His mother Jean was a hairdresser and his father John was a detective superintendent in the Metropolitan Police. He grew up in Rainham, London with his parents and younger brother.

Kemp attended Shenfield High School in Essex and the Webber Douglas Academy of Dramatic Art.

== Career ==
=== Acting ===
==== Early career ====
Kemp appeared in training films for the Ministry of Defence and the ITV soap opera Emmerdale Farm (now Emmerdale) as Graham Lodsworth. Guest appearances in London's Burning and Birds of a Feather followed, before he had a minor role in the 1987 film Playing Away alongside Neil Morrissey.

In 1990, Kemp appeared in an edition of the Anglia Television police drama The Chief. The episode, entitled "Call Sign Bravo", saw Kemp play the role of Police Constable Dennis Scovell. Around the same time he also starred in a golf-themed advert for Kellogg's Fruit & Fibre cereal.

==== EastEnders ====
Kemp's best-known role is that of hard man Grant Mitchell in the BBC soap opera EastEnders. Making his debut in February 1990, his character quickly became part of the soap's key storylines during the 1990s, particularly troubled marriages to Sharon Watts (Letitia Dean) and then Tiffany Mitchell (Martine McCutcheon), as well as the "Sharongate" storyline, which saw brother Phil Mitchell (Steve McFadden) having an affair with Grant's wife, which was uncovered two years after it began.

Kemp announced on 24 March 1999 that he would be leaving the soap later that year after nearly 10 years. His exit was aired in October 1999 when his character moved to Brazil after surviving a car crash. Kemp refused to rule out an eventual return to EastEnders, and various media reports over the next few years speculated that he would return to the series at some stage. In early 2005, the BBC confirmed that Kemp would be returning to EastEnders in the autumn of that year after six years away. It was co-star Barbara Windsor who convinced him to return, even though his comeback would only be a relatively brief one. His first comeback lasted just a few weeks from October 2005, but he returned again in March 2006, before departing once again in June that year.

In January 2016, it was confirmed that Kemp would make a brief return to the show for the death of Grant's on-screen mother, Peggy Mitchell (played by Windsor), appearing in three episodes during May of that year. He later filmed a further three weeks and returned again for brief stints from 4 July to 9 September 2016.

It was confirmed on 1 January 2025 that Kemp will reprise his role as Grant again in honour of the show's upcoming 40th anniversary. He returned on 13 February and departed on 27 February.

It was announced on 14 February 2026, that Kemp would be returning to EastEnders later in the year for a longer stint. Kemp's return aired on 27 April.

==== Other roles ====
Following his initial departure from EastEnders, Kemp moved from the BBC to ITV for a reported £1.2 million two-year deal. Kemp's first role for ITV was in Hero of the Hour. During its filming, on 27 October 1999, Kemp required hospital treatment after being shot in the face when a stunt went wrong. He suffered cuts to his chest and face after safety glass shattered, and was also hit in the face by the discharge from a blank round. He was treated at the scene by paramedics and made a full recovery.

In 2000, Kemp starred in ITV's A Christmas Carol. He took the lead roles in the television series Without Motive and In Defence in 2000, and in 2002's Ultimate Force, where he played Army Staff sergeant Henry Garvie from the British Special Air Service. He continued to appear in this role until 2006. He also played "Cinna", the lanista (gladiators' combat instructor), in the 2004 TV film, Spartacus.

In 2005, Kemp appeared in an episode of BBC's Extras and in a two-part adaptation of the Gerald Seymour novel A Line in the Sand for ITV. He has also presented on The Friday Night Project and appeared as a stand in host on The Paul O'Grady Show (2007, 2008).

Kemp appeared in the 4th episode of Series 14 of BBC's motoring show Top Gear. He was the "Man in Boot" of a Renault Twingo Sport being tested by Jeremy Clarkson. The test ended with Clarkson driving the car off the quayside of Belfast Harbour, after which Clarkson joked that Kemp had been killed. Kemp also appeared in Series 1, where he did 1 minute 54 seconds (wet) in the "Star in a Reasonably Priced Car" segment.

In 2022, Kemp began presenting the game show Bridge of Lies, airing on weekdays on BBC One, as well as a series of celebrity specials broadcast on Saturday evenings. Kemp told The Sunday Post: "I am the last person that should be hosting a game show, but it seems to work [...] the landscape of TV has changed significantly in the last six, seven years. Actors once upon a time didn't do commercials, now A-listers do them. If you worked in television, you couldn't be in movies or if you were in movies you'd never touch TV [...] that snobbery I would suggest is dissolving. And that's got to be a good thing I guess."

Kemp appeared on the second series of The Celebrity Traitors in October 2026. In the seventh episode, Kemp became the fourth celebrity to leave the castle when he was "murdered in plain sight" by the Traitors. Immediately after the episode aired, Kemp appeared on the spin-off show The Celebrity Traitors: Uncloaked where it is revealed to him who The Celebrity Traitors are.

=== Documentary presenter ===
In 2004, Kemp filmed Ross Kemp on Gangs. He followed this up with the documentaries Ross Kemp in Afghanistan, Ross Kemp in Search of Pirates, Ross Kemp: Battle for the Amazon and Ross Kemp: Extreme World.

In 2022 Kemp, who had previously taken part in deep sea dives for the television channel Sky History, had planned to mark the 110th anniversary of the sinking of the Titanic by recording a documentary in which he would undertake a dive to the wreckage using the submersible Titan. The project was shelved after production company Atlantic Productions deemed the submersible to be unsafe and not "fit for purpose".

In September 2024 Kemp launched a new documentary series titled Mafia and Britain.

=== Writing ===
Kemp has written several books. Initially focusing on tie-ins to his various TV documentaries, 2011 saw the publication of his first fictional story, Devil to Pay. A novel, Moving Target, was released in summer 2012. In September 2023, Kemp released Take Nothing for Granted: Tales from an Unexpected Life; a retrospective look back at his career.

== Political views ==
In 1999, Kemp was elected as Rector of the University of Glasgow as the candidate of the Glasgow University Labour Club but did not attend local meetings. In October 2000 the Glasgow University Students' Representative Council passed a motion requesting him to resign, and within weeks he did. Kemp was the first rector in 50 years to leave the position prematurely and was succeeded by Scottish actor Greg Hemphill.

In August 2014, Kemp was one of 200 public figures who were signatories to a letter to The Guardian opposing Scottish independence in the run-up to September's referendum on that issue.

In June 2017, Kemp endorsed the Labour Party at the 2017 general election, and took part in campaigning for Labour candidates.

In 2022, Kemp declared his support for a "National Thank You Day" to celebrate the Platinum Jubilee of Elizabeth II.

At the 2024 general election, Kemp publicly endorsed Rayleigh and Wickford Conservative Party MP Mark Francois. Francois, described by Kemp as a "fantastic MP", kept his seat.

== Personal life ==
On 11 June 2002, Kemp married Rebekah Wade, the then editor of The Sun. In November 2005, Wade was arrested following an alleged assault on Kemp. Kemp refused medical attention for a swollen lip and no action was taken. In March 2009 Kemp and Wade divorced, and in October 2010, Kemp fathered a boy with his partner, Nicola Coleman, who was his make-up artist.

Kemp married Renee O'Brien, an Australian, in 2012. They have three children, a boy and twin girls.

In May 2025, Kemp appeared on the BBC television series Who Do You Think You Are? He discovered that his maternal grandfather survived the sinking of the SS Duchess of York during World War II at the age of 50.

== Filmography ==
Year	Show	Role	Notes
1986–1987	Emmerdale	Graham Lodsworth	32 episodes
1987	The Moneymen	Dealer	Television film
1987	Playing Away	Sonny	
1988	London's Burning	Liver Salts	Episode: "Series 1, Episode 3"
1989	Birds of a Feather	Detective Inspector Monk	Episode: "Shift"
1989	Screen Two	Police Officer	Episode: "The Picnic"
1990	The Chief	PC Dennis Scovell	Episodes: "Daydreamer" & "Call Sign Bravo"
1990	The Manageress	Defender	Episode: "A Match for Anyone"
1990–1999, 2005–2006, 2016, 2025–2026	EastEnders	Grant Mitchell	1,098 episodes
1993	Doctor Who: Dimensions in Time	Grant Mitchell	Part Two
1998	EastEnders: The Mitchells – Naked Truths	Grant Mitchell	VHS special
1998	City Central	Dilly Dally	Episode: "Nothing Like a Dame"
1999	Ross Kemp: Alive in Alaska	Presenter	
2000	Hero of the Hour	Richie Liddle	Television film
2000	In Defence	Sam Lucas	4 episodes
2000	A Christmas Carol	Eddie Scrooge	Television film
2000–2001	Without Motive	DC Jack Mowbray	12 episodes
2002–2006	Ultimate Force	Staff Sgt. Henry 'Henno' Garvie	21 episodes
2003	The Crooked Man	Harry Fielding	Television film
2004	Spartacus	Cinna	Television film
2004	A Line in the Sand	Gavin Hughes / Frank Parry	2 episodes
2004–2009	Ross Kemp on Gangs	Presenter	20 episodes
2005	Extras	Himself	Episode: "Ross Kemp & Vinnie Jones"
2007	Robbie the Reindeer	Trooper No. 2	Episode: "Close Encounters of the Herd Kind"
2008–2012	Ross Kemp in Afghanistan	Presenter	18 episodes
2009	10 Minute Tales	Liam	Episode: "The Running of the Deer"
2009	Top Gear	Man in Boot	Episode: "Series 14, Episode 4"
2009	Ross Kemp in Search of Pirates	Presenter	3 episodes
2009	Ross Kemp: Behind the Story	Presenter	3 episodes
2010	Ross Kemp: Battle for the Amazon	Presenter	2 episodes
2011	Quick Slip Me a Bride	Trevor	
2011	That Sunday Night Show	Himself	
2011–2017	Ross Kemp: Extreme World	Presenter	37 episodes
2016	Ross Kemp's Britain	Presenter	3 episodes
2016	Ross Kemp: The Fight Against ISIS	Presenter	
2017	All Round to Mrs Brown's	Himself	
2017	Ross Kemp Behind Bars: Inside Barlinnie	Presenter	
2018	Ross Kemp & the Armed Police	Presenter	
2019	Welcome to HMP Belmarsh with Ross Kemp	Presenter	2 episodes
2020	Ross Kemp: On the NHS Frontline	Presenter	2 episodes
2020	The Millennium Dome Heist with Ross Kemp	Presenter	
2021	Britain's Tiger Kings - On The Trail With Ross Kemp	Presenter	2 episodes
2022	Searching for Michael Jackson's Zoo with Ross Kemp	Presenter	Documentary
2022–2023	Ross Kemp: Shipwreck Treasure Hunter	Presenter	2 series
2022–present	Bridge of Lies	Host	BBC quiz show
2023	Blindspot	Tony	Four-part series
2024	Ross Kemp: Mafia and Britain	Presenter	Five-part series
2025	EastEnders: 40 Years on The Square	Presenter	EastEnders’ 40th anniversary documentary
2025	Who Do You Think You Are?	Himself	One episode
2026	Ross Kemp: Lost Boys, Deadly Men	Presenter	Five-part series
2026	The Celebrity Traitors	Himself / Contestant	Series 2
TBC	Ross Kemp: The Nazis in Britain (w/t)	Presenter	Upcoming three-part documentary series

== Stage ==
Year	Title	Role	Notes
2018	Ross Kemp Extreme Tales Live	Himself	Dates: 6, 10 and 14 February

== Awards and nominations ==
Year	Group	Award	Won	Film/television series
1996	National Television Awards	Most Popular Actor	Nominated	EastEnders
1997	National Television Awards	Most Popular Actor	Nominated	EastEnders
1999	The British Soap Awards	Best Actor	Won	EastEnders
1999	British Soap Awards	Villain of the Year	Nominated	EastEnders
1999	British Soap Awards	Best Storyline (for Tiffany discovers Grants affair with her mum)	Won	EastEnders
1999	Inside Soap Awards	Best Actor	Won	EastEnders
1999	Inside Soap Awards	Villain of the Year	Nominated	EastEnders
1999	TV Quick and Choice Awards	Best Soap Actor	Won	EastEnders
1999	National Television Awards	Most Popular Actor	Nominated	EastEnders
2006	British Soap Awards	Best Actor	Won	EastEnders
2006	British Soap Awards	Best Storyline (for The Mitchells' Return)	Nominated	EastEnders
2006	British Soap Awards	Spectacular Scene of the year (for Phil's Close Shave)	Nominated	EastEnders
2006	Inside Soap Awards	Best Actor	Nominated	EastEnders
2006	Inside Soap Awards	Sexiest Male	Nominated	EastEnders
2006	Inside Soap Awards	Best Storyline (for The Mitchells' Return)	Nominated	EastEnders
2006	TV Quick and Choice Awards	Best Soap Actor	Nominated	EastEnders
2006	TV Quick and Choice Awards	Best Soap Storyline (for The Mitchells' Return)	Nominated	EastEnders
2006	National Television Awards	Most Popular Actor	Nominated	EastEnders
2006	BAFTA Awards	Best Factual Series	Won	Ross Kemp on Gangs
2008	AIB Media Excellence Awards	International TV Personality	Won	Ross Kemp in Afghanistan
2009	BAFTA Awards	Best Factual Series	Nominated	Ross Kemp in Afghanistan
2009	BAFTA Awards	Current Affairs	Nominated	Ross Kemp: A Kenya Special
2014	Asian Media Awards	Best Investigation	Won	Extreme World: India

Academic offices
Preceded by Richard Wilson	Rector of the University of Glasgow; 1999–2000	Succeeded by Greg Hemphill
