= Ross Kemp: Extreme World series 2 =

Ross Kemp: Extreme World
- Season 2
- Cover art of Region 2 DVD release
- Starring: Ross Kemp
- No. of episodes: 6

Release
- Original network: Sky One
- Original release: 3 September – 8 October 2012

Series chronology
- ← Previous; Series 1 Next → Series 3

The second series of Ross Kemp: Extreme World, a British documentary series, was broadcast on Sky 1 between 9 September and 8 October 2012.

== Episodes ==
No. overall	No. in series	Title	Original release date	UK viewers (millions)
1	6	"Pakistan"	3 September 2012	0.71m
Kemp and the team find themselves being caught in cross-fire as they report on the battle for Karachi in Pakistan.
2	7	"Venezuela"	10 September 2012	0.68m
Kemp makes his way to Caracas, Venezuela to learn how the world's most oil-rich nation has become one of its most violent.
3	8	"Glasgow"	17 September 2012	0.69m
Kemp is in Glasgow, where he learns that for some extreme poverty is a way of everyday life.
4	9	"Marseille"	24 September 2012	0.70m
Kemp visits Marseille, and takes a detour into one of the city's most dangerous and secure estates.
5	10	"New Orleans"	1 October 2012	0.54m
Kemp visits New Orleans, seven years on from Hurricane Katrina.
6	11	"East Africa"	8 October 2012	0.54m
Kemp visits Kenya and Tanzania, where a belief in witchcraft is deadly and deeply entrenched.

== Home media ==
The second series was released on to DVD in region 1 and region 2 on 19 November 2012.

== Ratings ==
Episode	Date	Official Sky One rating (In millions)	Sky One weekly rank	Total Sky One viewers
Episode 1	3 September 2012	0.71	N/A	N/A
Episode 2	10 September 2012	0.68	N/A	N/A
Episode 3	17 September 2012	0.69	N/A	N/A
Episode 4	24 September 2012	0.70	N/A	N/A
Episode 5	1 October 2012	0.54	N/A	N/A
Episode 6	8 October 2012	0.54	N/A	N/A
Series average				
