= Rosalind Wade =

British writer

Rosalind Wade OBE (pen name, Catharine Carr; 1909–1989) was a British novelist and short story writer. She was also the editor of The Contemporary Review for almost twenty years.

== Biography ==
Born on 11 September 1909, Rosalind Herschel Wade was the daughter of an army officer. She was educated in London, finishing at Bedford College.

Wade married banker William Kean Seymour (who was also a writer); they had two sons, one of whom is the thriller writer Gerald Seymour.

Beginning at the age of 22, Wade published some two dozen novels and many short stories. Wade used her full birth name of Rosalind Herschel Wade for some of her early works but Rosalind Wade for the bulk of her writing and "Catharine Carr" for a couple of books. Her novels are noted for their sometimes bleak examination of characters' emotional lives and troubles such as alcoholism. Morning Break (1956), for example, centres on a pair of schoolteachers in an English industrial town and the difficulties they encounter, ranging from student vandalism to infidelity. Treasure in Heaven (1937) is about a busy single woman who, at the age of 50, realizes she has been repressing her 'natural' desires and has thus missed out on crucial elements of a full life such as marriage and children.

Children, Be Happy! (published by Gollancz in 1931 to good reviews) became the centre of a minor literary furore just before it was to be republished in America by Farrar & Rinehart. The story was set in a girls' school, and apparently Wade based some of her characters on real people, because several women brought lawsuits and won damages from Gollancz. In one case, revolving on the fact that a minor character who lost her virginity outside marriage was based on an identifiable real woman, the plaintiff won more than just monetary damages. As part of the disposition of the case, the judge ordered the destruction of every copy of the book as well as the original manuscript. As a result, the book has never been republished in either country.

Among her short stories are many supernatural tales and ghost stories, collected in such anthologies as The Fourth Ghost Book (1965), Haunted Cornwall (1973), Tales from the Macabre (1976), More Tales from the Macabre (1979), After Midnight Stories (1985), and The Second Book of After Midnight Stories (1986).

In 1970, Wade took the post of editor of the literary journal The Contemporary Review, for which she also wrote book reviews. She held the post until 1989, when she was succeeded by Betty Abel.

Wade was active in writers' organizations, serving as president of the Society of Women Writers and Journalists (1965–89) and chair of the Alresford Historical and Literary Society (1968–70; 1972–73); she was also a founding member and vice-president of the West Country Writers Association.

She taught courses in writing and literature with her husband at Moor Park College, an adult education college in Farnham, near where they lived.

== Awards and honours ==
Wade was appointed an Officer of the Order of the British Empire in 1985 in recognition of her contributions to literature. She died on 25 January 1989.

== Books ==
=== As Rosalind Wade ===
- Children, Be Happy! (1931)
- Men Ask for Beauty (1936)
- Treasure in Heaven (1937)
- Fairweather Faith (1940)
- A Man of Promise (1940)
- Bracelet for Julia (1942)
- Pride of the Family (1943)
- Present Ending (1943)
- As the Narcissus (1945)
- The Widows (1946)
- Present Ending (1948)
- The Falling Leaves (1948)
- The Raft (1948?)
- Alys at Eadon (1951)
- The Silly Dove (1951)
- Cassandra Calls (1951)
- Come Fill the Cup (1955)
- Morning Break (1956)
- The Grain Will Grow (1957)
- The Will of Heaven (1958?)
- The Ramerson Case (1959)
- Mrs Jamison's Daughter (1960)
- A Small Shower (1961)
- New Pasture (1963)
- The Vanished Days (1965)
- Ladders (1965)
- The Umbrella (1970)
- The Golden Bowl (1972)
- Mrs Medland's Private World (1973)
- Red Letter Day: Twelve Stories of Cornwall (1980)

=== As Catharine Carr ===
- English Summer (1953?)
- The Golden City (1963?)
