= Ross Kemp: Extreme World series 1 =

Ross Kemp: Extreme World
- Season 1
- Cover art of Region 2 DVD release
- Starring: Ross Kemp
- No. of episodes: 5

Release
- Original network: Sky One
- Original release: 21 February – 21 March 2011

Series chronology
- Next → Series 2

The first series of Ross Kemp: Extreme World, a British documentary series, was broadcast on Sky 1 between 21 February and 21 March 2011.

== Episodes ==
No. overall	No. in series	Title	Original release date	UK viewers (millions)
1	1	"Chicago"	21 February 2011	0.83m
Kemp looks at the problem of heroin in inner-city Chicago, meeting with both dealers and users. He also visits a chop-house, and speaks with a crime boss who is responsible for looking after the West Side.
2	2	"Congo"	28 February 2011	0.72m
Kemp travels to the Congo to investigate the ongoing war over minerals. He interviews women who have suffered torture at the hands of the Hutus, and speaks with a leading doctor who set up a hospital and refuge ten years ago for the victims of such abuse. He also travels to a Coltan mine to look at the hardship suffered by mine workers.
3	3	"Mexico"	7 March 2011	0.87m
Ross travels to Ciudad Juarez, where on average, nine murders take place each day. He speaks with the local mayor who has played an integral part in dispatching 11,000 police officers and a further 7,500 soldiers onto the streets to control the level of violence.
4	4	"Haiti"	14 March 2011	0.69m
Ross travels to Haiti in the wake of an earthquake which measured 7.7 on the moment magnitude scale. He visits a camp where an outbreak of cholera has caused multiple deaths, and speaks with former presidential candidate Wyclef Jean as presidential voting gets underway.
5	5	"London/Romania"	21 March 2011	0.81m
Kemp investigates human trafficking in the United Kingdom.

== Home media ==
The first series was released on to DVD on 28 March 2011 on region 2 only.

== Ratings ==
Episode	Date	Official Sky One rating (In millions)	Sky One weekly rank	Total Sky One viewers
Episode 1	21 February 2011	0.83	N/A	N/A
Episode 2	28 February 2011	0.72	N/A	N/A
Episode 3	7 March 2011	0.87	N/A	N/A
Episode 4	7 March 2011	0.69	N/A	N/A
Episode 5	21 March 2011	0.81	N/A	N/A
Series average				
