= Rookies (American TV series) =

- Genre: Reality television
- Country of origin: United States
- Original language: English
- No. of seasons: 1
- No. of episodes: 16

Production
- Running time: 30 minutes (per episode)
- Production companies: Tiger Aspect Productions; ThinkFactory Media

Original release
- Network: A&E
- Release: October 21, 2008 – May 2009

Rookies is a reality television series which aired on the A&E television network. The show follows the training periods of rookie police officers in Jefferson Parish, Louisiana, and Tampa, Florida, as they train on the beat with their field training officers for their first 12 weeks. The episodes include rookie mistakes, training sessions by veteran officers, and final evaluations. Rookies debuted on October 21, 2008 and ended in May 2009.

== Overview ==
This show is about fresh-faced police recruits learning and practicing law enforcement while on the job.

== Cast ==
The cast consisted of Dennis Cooper, Amy Hess, Tommie Tolbert, Henry Conravey, Mark Monson, Hugh Herndon, Elton Johnson, April Levine, and Rebecca Webster.

== Reception ==
Common Sense Media gave the show 3 out of 5 stars.
