= The Virgin Diaries =

- Starring: Peter Grealis *Achill Island
- Country of origin: United Kingdom
- No. of episodes: 10

Production
- Running time: 30 minutes
- Production company: Tiger Aspect Productions

Original release
- Network: MTV UK
- Release: 27 August 2006 – November 2006

The Virgin Diaries is a reality television show produced by Tiger Aspect Productions for MTV UK. Each episode follows young adults between the ages of 16 and 18 as they contemplate sex, sexuality, and their own virginity. The show was criticised by psychiatrists and teen experts.

== Participants ==
- Episode 1 - Chervana
- Episode 2 - Craig
- Episode 3 - Nicola
- Episode 4 - Liam
- Episode 5 - Mark
- Episode 6 - Charlotte
- Episode 7 - Sophia
- Episode 8 - Jack
- Episode 9 - Sam
- Episode 10 - Debbie

== Spin-off ==
A spin-off series entitled The Bedroom Diaries began airing on MTV UK on 4 February 2008. Following a similar format, the series features one young person per episode as they discuss their bedroom antics.
