= William Kean Seymour =

William Kean Seymour (1887–1975) was a British writer, by profession a bank manager. He was a poet and critic, novelist, journalist and literary editor.

His first wife was the novelist and short story writer Beatrice Kean Seymour, who died in 1955. His second wife was the novelist and short story writer Rosalind Wade, with whom he had two sons, one of whom is the writer Gerald Seymour.

In 1919, he edited a collection of poems called Miscellany of Poetry, which featured contributions from some major British poets of the time.

== Works ==
- The Street of Dreams (1914) poems
- To Verhaeren (1917) poems
- Twenty-Four Poems (1918) poems
- Swords and Flutes (1919) poems
- Miscellany Of Poetry (1910) editor
- A Jackdaw in Georgia (1925) parodies
- Parrot Pie (1927) parodies
- Caesar Remembers (1929) poems
- Time Stands (1935) poems
- The Little Cages (1944) first novel
- Collected Poems (1946) poems
- So Sceptical My Heart (1951)
- Store of Trees (1951)
- Friends of the Swallow (1953)
- The Secret Kingdom (1954)
- Names & Faces (1956)
- The First Childermas (1959) play
- Pattern of Poetry (1963) with John Smith
- Jonathan Swift: Enigma of a Genius (1967) biography
- Silver Jubilee (1969)
- The Cats of Rome (1970)

== Poets in Miscellany of Poetry (1919) ==
The full text is available online at Project Gutenberg at . The poets featured in this collection were as follows:

Laurence Binyon - F. V. Branford - G. K. Chesterton - Richard Church - William H. Davies - Geoffrey Dearmer - John Drinkwater - Wilfrid Wilson Gibson - Louis Golding - Gerald Gould - Laurence Housman - Richard Le Gallienne - Eugene Mason - T. Sturge Moore - Theodore Maynard - Rose Macaulay - Thomas Moult - Robert Nichols - Eden Phillpotts - Arthur K. Sabin - Margaret Sackville - William Kean Seymour - Horace Shipp - Edith Sitwell - Muriel Stuart - W. R. Titterton - E. H. Visiak - Alec Waugh - Charles Williams
