= Ross Kemp: Extreme World series 6 =

Ross Kemp: Extreme World
- Season 6 (includes 1 special)
- Starring: Ross Kemp
- No. of episodes: 6

Release
- Original network: Sky One
- Original release: 21 February – 5 August 2017

Series chronology
- ← Previous; Series 5

The sixth and final series of Ross Kemp: Extreme World began airing on 21 February 2017 and consists of six 60 minute episodes. The show was not renewed after this series.

== Episodes ==
No. overall	No. in series	Title	Original release date	UK viewers (millions)
1	31	"Special: Libya's Migrant Hell"	21 February 2017	N/A
Kemp travels to Libya to explore the increasing problem of migration to Europe, which for many, results in long stays in illegal detention centres, being forced to work as prostitutes or becoming victims of illegal human trafficking. Kemp makes the journey with a group of migrants as they attempt to make it across central Europe into Italy.
2	32	"Texas"	8 July 2017	N/A
Kemp visits Austin, Texas, to investigate growing racial tension in the wake of President Trump's election. He discovers hate groups are gaining in popularity and extremists on both sides are arming themselves for a race war, and speaks to members of the Ku Klux Klan and a black separatist militia group.
3	33	"West Bank"	15 July 2017	N/A
Kemp investigates the physical and psychological impact that a new drug called hydro is having on the local Palestinian and Israeli populations. With such a fractious political situation in the region and the police forces unable to work together, it is a complex problem that is being left up to local communities to try to solve themselves.
4	34	"Manila"	22 July 2017	N/A
Kemp investigates crystal meth use in the Philippines and the election of Rodrigo Duterte as president. His zero tolerance policy on drug abuse has seen 3,000 suspected drug dealers and users killed.
5	35	"Naples"	29 July 2017	N/A
Kemp gains unprecedented access to the world of the Camorra crime syndicate as he investigates a street war that has claimed more than 4,000 lives in Naples.
6	36	"Madagascar"	5 August 2017	N/A
Kemp goes to the South of Madagascar to investigate a mob called the Dahalo, who kidnap zebus and burn villages
