= Paul Merton in India =

- Genre: Travel documentary
- Presented by: Paul Merton
- Narrated by: Paul Merton
- Country of origin: United Kingdom
- Original language: English
- No. of series: 1
- No. of episodes: 5

Production
- Production location: India
- Running time: 60 minutes (inc. adverts)
- Production company: Tiger Aspect Productions

Original release
- Network: Five
- Release: 8 October – 5 November 2008

Related
- Paul Merton in China; Paul Merton in Europe

Paul Merton in India is a travel documentary broadcast on Five in 2008. It follows comedian Paul Merton as he travels around various places in the country, such as Delhi and the Punjab, sampling various offbeat and out of the normal aspects of India.

The series was commissioned after the success of the previous series Paul Merton in China.

It was broadcast on Fox History & Entertainment in India and on AXS TV in the USA.
