= Richard E. Grant's Hotel Secrets =

British TV series with Richard E. Grant

- Country of origin: United Kingdom
- Original language: English
- No. of series: 2
- No. of episodes: 14

Production
- Running time: 44 minutes
- Production company: Burning Bright Productions

Original release
- Network: Sky Atlantic
- Release: 2012 – 2014

Richard E. Grant's Hotel Secrets is a British TV series where actor Richard E. Grant visits extremely expensive hotels around the world. It was made by Burning Bright Productions (established 2011). The series was produced and directed by Mike Reilly. The series has been sold to other countries, known as Hotellien salattu maailma in Finland and Hoteltitkok in Hungary.

== Series 1 (2012) ==
The first series was broadcast in the United Kingdom on Sky beginning 25 October 2012. The first six episodes were thematic, with Grant travelling worldwide to hotels that fell into the episode's theme. In the final two, Grant concentrated on one geographical area: Ireland for its tradition of hospitality, and the French Riviera.

- Power and Money. Las Vegas, California and New York.
- Living and Dying. L'Hôtel in Paris, Hotel Chelsea in New York
- Scandal. Chateau Marmont on Sunset Boulevard in Hollywood
- VIP. The Dorchester, London; Hôtel Meurice, Paris; Mandalay Bay, Las Vegas
- The Extra Factor. Paris, Los Angeles
- Sex. Beverly Wilshire Hotel in Los Angeles, L'Hôtel in Paris
- Ireland. Ashford Castle, Cong, Co. Galway; Europa Hotel, Belfast; Castle Leslie, Co. Monaghan; Hotel Shelbourne and the Clarence Hotel, Dublin; Ballyfin Demesne Hotel, Ballyfin, Co. Laois
- French Riviera. Hôtel de Paris Monte-Carlo, Monte Carlo, Monaco; Hotel Negresco, Nice, Hôtel du Cap, Eden Roc, Cap Ferrat

== Series 2 (2014) ==
- Miami Beach: Delano Hotel, Fontainebleau Hotel and Betsy hotel.
- Hong Kong Mandarin Hotel, Peninsula Hotel
- Berlin
- New Orleans
- Tokyo
- Venice: Hotel Cipriani, Hotel Danieli, Bauer Hotel (Francesca Bortolotto Possati), Gritti Palace Hotel, Hotel Excelsior on the Lido di Venezia
