= Red Fox (film) =

- Genre: Drama; Thriller
- Based on: Red Fox by Gerald Seymour
- Screenplay by: James McManus
- Directed by: Ian Toynton
- Starring: John Hurt; Jane Birkin; Didier Flamand; François Négret; Brian Cox
- Composer: Alan Parker
- Country of origin: United Kingdom
- Original language: English
- No. of series: 1
- No. of episodes: 2

Production
- Executive producers: Nick Elliott; Muir Sutherland
- Producers: Adrian Bate; Ian Toynton
- Production locations: London, England, UK; Paris, France
- Running time: 150 minutes
- Production companies: Turning Point/Celtic Films; LWT

Original release
- Network: ITV
- Release: 8 December – 15 December 1991

Red Fox is a British television film, a thriller based on the international bestselling 1979 novel of the same name by Gerald Seymour. Originally aired on ITV in two parts between 8 and 15 December 1991, it stars John Hurt, Jane Birkin, Didier Flamand, François Négret, and Brian Cox. It was produced by Turning Point/Celtic Films in association with LWT for the ITV network.

== Cast ==
- John Hurt as Archie Carpenter
- Jane Birkin as Violet Harrison
- Didier Flamand as Paul de Vigny
- François Négret as Louis
- Brian Cox as Geoffrey Harrison
- Corinne Touzet as Justine
- Geoffrey Whitehead as Ambassador
- Michael Thomas as Johnson
- Marc Samuel as Anatole
- John Vine as Woodley
- David Saville as Sir David Adams

== Episodes ==
No.	Title	Directed by	Written by	Original release date	UK viewers (millions)
1	"Episode 1"	Ian Toynton	James MacManus	8 December 1991	N/A
A British businessman named Geoffrey Harrison is kidnapped by Louis in Paris and his company's head of security is despatched to get him out. But some fanatical terrorists have other ideas. Archie Carpenter, a security chief investigating the disappearance of British businessman Geoffrey Harrison, his wife Violet had no such problems as she lives in Paris.
2	"Episode 2"	Ian Toynton	James MacManus	15 December 1991	N/A
In the stifling heat of a Paris summer, Louis moves the kidnapped Harrison into a deserted warehouse and has been ordered to execute his prisoner by his leader and lover Justine. Meanwhile, Security Chief Carpenter persuades Harrison's wife Violet to give a televised appeal, hoping that someone might recognise Louis or her husband.
