= Ross Kemp: Extreme World series 4 =

Ross Kemp: Extreme World
- Season 4
- Series Four title cards
- Starring: Ross Kemp
- No. of episodes: 7

Release
- Original network: Sky One
- Original release: 22 February – 5 March 2015

Series chronology
- ← Previous; Series 3 Next → Series 5

The fourth series of Ross Kemp: Extreme World was broadcast on Sky One between 22 January and 5 March 2015.

== Episodes ==
No. overall	No. in series	Title	Original release date	UK viewers (millions)
1	18	"Ukraine"	22 January 2015	0.64m
Kemp investigates the increasing tension between Pro-Russian Separatists and the Ukrainian Nationalists as Russia threatens a full scale invasion of the country. He heads to the frontline to speak with the Azov Battalion, a unit hailed as heroes in their homeland for fighting Russian snipers without assistance from the Government or Ukrainian Army.
2	19	"South Africa"	29 January 2015	0.59m
Kemp visits South Africa, where it is estimated that over 50% of women have been raped at least once in their lifetime, and spends time in a town where gangs view rape as a hobby. He speaks with ministers and campaigners fighting for justice for the victims, and learns that 85% of children under 12 have witnessed a rape.
3	20	"Honduras"	5 February 2015	0.52m
Kemp travels to Honduras. He undertakes the 1,500 mile journey travelled by more than 1,200 migrants every day, who attempt to reach the American border to escape violent gangs and bandits, whose sole aim is to rob, assault and kidnap vulnerable victims.
4	21	"Calais"	12 February 2015	0.52m
Kemp investigates migration in camps just outside the port of Calais, where more than 10,500 people attempted to enter the UK illegally over the course of six months in 2014. He meets with the UK border force, and learns how migrants attempt to avoid detection.
5	22	"Memphis"	19 February 2015	0.50m
Kemp heads to Memphis to find out if the bill of rights, passed in 1964, which was intended to ease the segregation of African-American and White American communities, is still effective in modern society. He tries to discover the reasons why so many young African-American children end up in a destructive lifestyle of drugs and guns.
6	23	"Australia"	26 February 2015	0.55m
Kemp travels across Australia with motorcycle groups, who are targeted by new laws implemented by the Australian government in the light of outbreaks of violence. He meets with a chief of police to find out if these laws can be truly justified.
7	24	"Special: Britain's Deprived Coast"	5 March 2015	0.53m
Kemp takes a look at the cultures which operate in some of Britain's most deprived seaside towns, including drug dealing, poverty and homelessness. He speaks with residents of Britain's most deprived town, Jaywick, where the number of unemployed workers is 50% higher than the national average, as well as travelling to Blackpool and Margate.

== Ratings ==
Episode	Date	Official Sky One rating (In millions)	Sky One weekly rank	Total Sky One viewers
Episode 1	22 January 2015	0.64	N/A	N/A
Episode 2	29 January 2015	0.59	N/A	N/A
Episode 3	5 February 2015	0.52	N/A	N/A
Episode 4	12 February 2015	0.52	N/A	N/A
Episode 5	19 February 2015	0.50	N/A	N/A
Episode 6	26 February 2015	0.55	N/A	N/A
Episode 7	5 March 2015	0.53	N/A	N/A
Series average				
