= Beatrice Kean Seymour =

British novelist

- Seymour, c. 1919
- Born: Beatrice Mary Stapleton; 1 September 1886; Clapham, south London
- Occupation: Writer
- Spouse: William Kean Seymour

Beatrice Mary Kean Seymour (née Stapleton; 1 September 1886 – 31 October 1955) was an English prolific novelist and short story writer. Her obituary in The Times described her as skilled at portraying English domestic life.

== Biography ==
Beatrice Mary Stapleton was born in Clapham, south London into a working-class family. Her father David was a farrier.

She attended a secretarial school and was the first wife of William Kean Seymour.

She began her professional life as a writer of short stories for magazines. However, at the suggestion of an editor, she reworked one of her unpublished short stories into her first novel Invisible Tides. She subsequently wrote over 30 books during a career that spanned more than three decades. Her novels were published almost annually until shortly before her death from heart problems in 1955.

== Approach to writing ==
Seymour believed the role of the novelist is to help readers think through their emotions. She saw the novel as far superior to the short story as a vehicle for conveying social ideas.

== Critical reception ==
Some British reviewers reportedly considered Invisible Tides to be the best novel of 1920. A reviewer from The Bookman wrote that it was: "a good and moving story, brilliantly set down, having affinities, it seems to us, with Jude the Obscure on the one hand and with Mr. McKenna's Sonia on the other. Mrs. Seymour is strong in characterisation, subtle and revealing in dialogue, and exquisite in her descriptions of nature, touched as they are with a fine imaginativeness".

Her 1925 novel Unveiled received a glowing review in the 30 May 1925 issue of The New Yorker. But some critical responses were not so favourable. A Times Literary Supplement critic wrote of her 1927 novel Three Wives: "Had Miss Seymour compressed her novel into three-quarters its present length, it might have been a really distinguished piece of work".

When she died in 1955, The Times said of her: “She had already established herself as a literary figure of importance 30 years ago and the skill and variety with which she portrayed English domestic scenes and projected them against a larger social and political background are of a high order”.

More recently, her novels have been appraised as reflecting an alertness to the role of women in society.

== Published works ==
=== Novels ===
- Invisible Tides (1919)
- Intrusion (1921)
- The Hopeful Journey (1923)
- The Romantic Tradition (1925)
- Unveiled (1925)
- The Last Day (1926)
- Three Wives (1927)
- Youth Rides Out (1928)
- False Spring (1929)
- But Not for Love (1931)
- With Heartiest Christmas and New Year Greetings (1932) with William Kean Seymour
- Maids and Mistresses (1932)
- Daughter to Philip (1933)
- Interlude for Sally (1934)
- Frost at Morning (1935)
- Summer of Life (1936)
- The Happier Eden (1937)
- Fool of Time (1940)
- The Chronicles of Sally (1940)
- The Unquiet Field (1940)
- Happy Ever After (1941)
- Return Journey (1942)
- Buds of May (1943)
- Joy as it Flies (1944)
- Tumbled House (1946)
- Family Group (1947)
- The Children Grow Up (1949)
- The Second Mrs. Cornford (1951)
- The Wine is Poured (1953)
- The Painted Lath (1955)

=== Non-fiction ===
- Jane Austen; a Study for a Portrait (1937)

=== Short stories and chapters ===
- "Journey's End" in Georgian Stories (1927), edited by Arthur Waugh
- Introduction to The Pitiful Wife (1931) by Storm Jameson
