= Paul Merton in China =

- Genre: Comedy
- Directed by: Barbie MacLaurin
- Presented by: Paul Merton
- Narrated by: Paul Merton
- Composer: Rohan Stevenson
- Country of origin: United Kingdom
- Original languages: English; Chinese
- No. of series: 1
- No. of episodes: 4

Production
- Executive producer: Paul Sommers
- Producers: Mark Chapman; Simon Onwurah
- Production location: People's Republic of China
- Editors: Doug Bryson; Alex Muggleton
- Running time: 60 minutes (inc. adverts)
- Production company: Tiger Aspect Productions

Original release
- Network: Five
- Release: 21 May – 11 June 2007

Related
- Paul Merton in India; Paul Merton in Europe

Paul Merton in China is a four-part television series broadcast on Five commencing from 21 May 2007. It follows the journey of writer and comedian, Paul Merton and his interpreter Emma, as they travel across the vast country, exploring Chinese culture, expansion and changes from the rule of Mao Zedong. The series was a hit for Five and Merton confirmed on Michael Parkinson's show that a second series entitled Paul Merton in India had been commissioned. The theme music from Channel Five's advertisement is Michel Legrand's Di Gue Ding Ding, which was also used as the theme music to Heston Blumenthal's series In Search of Perfection aired concurrently on BBC Two. All four episodes were released on DVD in late-October 2008.

== Production ==
- During filming in China, he was continuously escorted around by government appointed officials, as many documentary makers in the country are; therefore Merton was mostly limited to what the officials wanted him to see.
- While staying in a Chinese hotel, the staff were told to expect the arrival of a "Western celebrity". When Merton and his interpreter arrived at the hotel, he was greeted personally by the owner who mistakenly believed he was Paul Martin, the former Canadian prime minister; as "Martin" is Merton's real surname.

== Ratings ==
The first episode was watched by 2,000,000 viewers and was the fifth-most watched programme on Channel 5. The second episode gathered 1,580,000 views and was the sixth-most watched show on the channel. The last two episodes received 2,000,000 and 1,850,000 viewers and were placed sixth and fifth respectively.
