= Paul Merton in Europe =

- Genre: Comedy
- Presented by: Paul Merton
- Narrated by: Paul Merton
- Country of origin: United Kingdom
- Original language: English
- No. of series: 1
- No. of episodes: 6

Production
- Executive producer: Paul Sommers
- Producer: John Hodgson
- Production location: Europe
- Running time: 60 minutes (inc. adverts)
- Production company: Tiger Aspect Productions

Original release
- Network: Channel 5
- Release: 11 January – 15 February 2010

Related
- Paul Merton in China; Paul Merton in India; Paul Merton's Adventures

Paul Merton in Europe is a six-part television series airing on Channel 5 from 11 January 2010 onwards. The series is a follow-up to Paul Merton in India. It follows presenter Paul Merton as he travels around several countries in Europe including Germany, Ireland, Italy, France and Spain. The series was released on DVD on 8 March 2010.

== Episode list ==
No.	Location	Original release date
1	Germany	11 January 2010
2	Germany and Ireland	18 January 2010
3	Ireland	25 January 2010
4	Italy	1 February 2010
5	France	8 February 2010
6	Spain	15 February 2010
