= Celtic Films =

British production company

Celtic Films is a British production company based in London and best known for its involvement in the Sharpe series. It was founded in 1986. At present, it is separately incorporated as Celtic Films Entertainment, Celtic Films España, Celtic Films Pvt. Ltd., Celtic Digital, AZ Celtic Films, and Sharpe Film.

It has also been involved in the Red Fox, Hornblower and Ambassadors series and the film The Monk. In 2007, Celtic Films Entertainment announced that it had a Flashman series under development, but it has not yet been produced.

It failed in its 1986 bid to control the satellite network eventually given to British Satellite Broadcasting.
