= Tiger Aspect =

British television production company

Tiger Aspect Productions
- Logo used since 2022
- Formerly: Tiger Television (1988–1993)
- Type: Subsidiary
- Industry: Film; Television
- Predecessor: Aspect Film & Television (1979–1993)
- Founded: 1988; 38 years ago
- Founder: Peter Bennett-Jones
- Headquarters: London, England, UK
- Key people: Lucy Bedford (managing director); Helen Wright (chief operating officer)
- Products: Mr. Bean; The Vicar of Dibley
- Services: Film production; Television production
- Parent: IMG Media (2006–2009); Banijay UK Productions (2009–present)
- Divisions: Tiger Aspect Comedy; Tiger Aspect Drama
- Website: www.tigeraspect.co.uk

Tiger Aspect Productions (formerly known as Tiger Television from 1988 until 1993 and also known as Tiger Aspect Films for theatrical films) is a British television and film production company, particularly noted for its situation comedies. Founded by Peter Bennett-Jones, its productions have included popular hits such as Mr. Bean and The Vicar of Dibley. The present-day company was founded in 1993 from the merger of Bennett-Jones' Tiger Television and Paul Sommers' Aspect Film & Television.

It has also produced television dramas such as Murphy's Law and Sherlock Holmes and the Case of the Silk Stocking, and in October 2006, its drama series Robin Hood began showing on BBC One. They also produced the American reality television series Damage Control for MTV, and the animated children's television series Charlie and Lola, which was based on the books written by Lauren Child. Tiger Aspect has also made a documentary at the Buckinghamshire Railway Centre (BRC), Quainton, on the life of Sir John Betjeman for his centenary celebrations.

In June 2006, Tiger Aspect and Tigress Productions were purchased by IMG Media, an international talent and rights group, but were then sold to Endemol UK in November 2009.

== Filmography ==
- And When Did You Last See Your Father? (co-production with Film4, UK Film Council, EM Media and European Development Fund)
- The Bad Education Movie (co-production with Cave Bear Productions and Entertainment Film Distributors)
- Bean (co-production with Universal Pictures, PolyGram Filmed Entertainment, Gramercy Pictures and Working Title Films)
- Billy Elliot (co-production with Universal Focus, Working Title Films, StudioCanal and BBC Films)
- The Boys Are Back (co-production with Australian Film Finance Corporation, Miramax Films, Hopscotch Productions, Screen Australia, South Australian Film Corporation, HanWay Films and Southern Light Films)
- Dog Eat Dog (co-production with FilmFour, Senator Film, and Shona Productions)
- Kevin & Perry Go Large (co-production with Icon Productions, Icon Entertainment International and Fragile Films)
- The League of Gentlemen's Apocalypse (co-production with Universal Pictures, FilmFour, United International Pictures and Hells Kitchen International)
- The Martins (co-production with Icon Productions, Icon Entertainment International and Isle of Man Film Commission)
- Mr. Bean's Holiday (co-production with Universal Pictures, StudioCanal and Working Title Films)
- Omagh (co-production with Hell's Kitchen International, A-Film Distribution and Haut Et Court)

== Current programmes ==
- Deep Fake Neighbour Wars

== Former programmes ==
- Adrian Mole: The Cappuccino Years (BBC One 2001)
- An Island Parish (BBC Two 2007–2022)
- Armchair Detectives (BBC One 2017)
- Argumental (Dave 2008–2012)
- Backchat (BBC Three 2013–2014, BBC Two 2015)
- Bad Education (BBC Three 2012–2014)
- Bad Sugar (Channel 4 2012)
- Beat the Crusher (Sky1 1998)
- Beehive (E4 2008)
- Benidorm (ITV 2007–2018)
- Billie and the Real Belle Bare All (ITV2 2010)
- Births, Marriages and Deaths (BBC Two) (1999)
- Blackadder: Back & Forth (Sky1 1999)
- Bounty Hunters (Sky1 2017–2019)
- Boy Meets Girl (BBC Two 2015–2016)
- Britain's Best Brain (Channel 5 2009)
- The Catherine Tate Show (BBC Two 2004–2006, BBC One 2007)
- Catherine Tate's Nan (BBC One 2009–2015)
- Celeb (BBC One 2003)
- Chaos at the Chateau (Channel 4 2007)
- Charlie and Lola (CBeebies 2005–2008)
- Coming Down the Mountain (BBC One 2007)
- Country House (BBC One 1998–1999)
- Crackanory (Dave 2013–2017)
- Crooked House (BBC Four 2008)
- Cuffs (BBC One 2015)
- Damage Control (MTV 2005 in the USA)
- The Dame Edna Treatment (ITV 2007)
- Deadline (ITV2 2007)
- Decline and Fall (BBC One 2017)
- The Deep (BBC One 2010)
- Double Time (ITV 2007)
- Drunk History (Comedy Central 2015–2017)
- Extreme Trains (The History Channel 2008)
- Family Business (BBC One 2004)
- Fat Friends (ITV 2000–2005)
- The Fitz (BBC Two 2000)
- Fortitude (Sky Atlantic 2015–2018)
- Gimme Gimme Gimme (BBC Two 1999–2000, BBC One 2001)
- The Good Karma Hospital (ITV 2017–2022)
- Grandma's House (BBC Two 2010–2012)
- Harry & Paul (BBC One 2007–2008, BBC Two 2010–2012)
- Harry Enfield and Chums (BBC One 1994–1998)
- Harry Enfield's Brand Spanking New Show (Sky1 2000)
- Heroes and Villains (BBC 1994)
- Horne & Corden (BBC Three 2009)
- The Hound of the Baskervilles (BBC One 2002)
- House Auction (Channel 4 2005)
- I Survived a Zombie Apocalypse (BBC Three 2015)
- Jack Whitehall: Travels with My Father (Netflix 2017–2021)
- Justin Lee Collins: Good Times (Channel 5 2010)
- Justin Lee Collins: Turning Japanese (Channel 5 2011)
- Ladies of Letters (ITV3 2010–2009)
- Lenny Henry in Pieces (BBC One 2000–2003)
- The Lenny Henry Show (BBC One 1984–2005)
- Let Them Eat Cake (BBC One 1999)
- Life in Squares (BBC Two 2015)
- Life of Python (Showtime, BBC One 1990)
- Lip Service (ITV2 2006)
- Little Crackers (Sky1 2010–2012)
- Love and Marriage (ITV 2013)
- Low Winter Sun (UK series; Channel 4 2006)
- Low Winter Sun (US series; AMC 2013)
- Make Me a Supermodel (UK series; Channel 5 2005–2006)
- Make Me a Supermodel (US series; Bravo 2008–2009)
- Marvellous (BBC Two 2014)
- Mister Eleven (ITV 2009)
- The Monastery (BBC Two 2005)
- Mount Pleasant (Sky1 2011–2017)
- Mr. Bean (ITV 1990–1995)
- Mr. Bean: The Animated Series (ITV 2002–2004, CITV 2004-2019)
- Murder in Successville (BBC Three 2015–2017)
- Murphy's Law (BBC One 2001–2007)
- My Fragile Heart (ITV 2000)
- My Mad Fat Diary (E4 2013–2015)
- My New Best Friend (Channel 4 2003)
- Nazi Pop Twins (Channel 4 2007)
- No Heroics (ITV2 2008)
- Paul Merton in China (Channel 5 2007)
- Paul Merton in India (Channel 5 2008)
- Paul Merton in Europe (Channel 5 2010)
- Paul Merton's Adventures (Channel 5 2011)
- Peaky Blinders (BBC Two 2013–2017, BBC One 2018–2022)
- Perfect World (BBC Two 2000–2001)
- Pilgrim's Rest (BBC One 1997)
- Playing the Field (BBC One 1998–2002)
- Prisoners’ Wives (BBC One 2012–2013)
- Psychobitches (Sky Arts 2012–2014)
- Public Enemies (BBC One 2012)
- Rescue Me (BBC One 2002)
- The Restoration Man (Channel 4 2010–2017)
- Ripper Street (BBC One 2012–2014, BBC Two 2016)
- Robin Hood (BBC One 2006–2009)
- Robson Green's Wild Swimming Adventure (ITV 2009)
- Roman's Empire (BBC Two 2007)
- Rookies (A&E 2008–2009)
- Root Into Europe (ITV 1992)
- Ross Kemp in Afghanistan (Sky1 2008–2012)
- Ross Kemp in Search of Pirates (Sky1 2009)
- Ross Kemp on Gangs (Sky1 2004–2009)
- Ross Kemp: Battle for the Amazon (Sky1 2010)
- Ross Kemp: Behind the Story (Sky1 2009)
- Ross Kemp: Extreme World (Sky1 2011–2017)
- A Seaside Parish (BBC Two 2003)
- Secret Diary of a Call Girl (ITV2 2007–2011)
- Sherlock Holmes and the Case of the Silk Stocking (BBC One 2004)
- Something for the Weekend (Channel 4 1999–2000)
- Stella Street (BBC Two 1997–2001)
- Streetmate (Channel 4 1998–2001, 2016–2017, BBC One 2003, ITV2 2007)
- Summerhill (CBBC Channel 2008)
- Swiss Toni (BBC Three 2003–2004)
- Teachers (Channel 4 2001–2004)
- The Thin Blue Line (BBC One 1995–1996)
- This is Jinsy (Sky Atlantic 2010–2014)
- Tinga Tinga Tales (CBeebies, Disney Jr., DreamWorks Channel 2010–2011)
- Together (BBC Three 2015)
- Undercover Dads! (BBC Two 2009)
- Vanity Lair (Channel 4 2008)
- The Vicar of Dibley (BBC One 1994–2007)
- Victoria's Empire (BBC One 2007)
- Viewpoint (ITV 2021)
- The Virgin Diaries (MTV UK 2006)
- Vital Signs (ITV 2006)
- White Girl (BBC One 2008)
- The Worst Journey in the World (BBC Four 2007)

== Awards and nominations ==
Several Tiger Aspect productions have received BAFTA awards:

- 2000: Alexander Korda Award to Greg Brenman, Jonathan Finn, Stephen Daldry for Most Outstanding Film of the Year – Billy Elliot
- 2000: Huw Wheldon Award to Paul Sommers, Jan Younghusband, Howard Goodall for: Howard Goodall's Big Bangs
- 2001: DoubleTake pilot
- 2005: Best Single Drama for Omagh, Greg Brenman, Ed Guiney, Paul Greengrass, Pete Travis & Guy Hibbert
- 2006: Best Factual Series, for Ross Kemp on Gangs, Clive Tulloh, Ross Kemp & Amelia Hann
- 2009: Best Single Drama, for White Girl

Year	Association	Category	Nominee(s)	Result
2017	Diversity in Media Awards	Organisation of the Year	Tiger Aspect Productions	Nominated

Year	Association	Category	Nominee(s)	Result
2017	Diversity in Media Awards	Production Company of the Year	Tiger Aspect Productions	Nominated
