= Paul Merton's Birth of Hollywood =

- Genre: Documentary
- Created by: Paul Merton
- Written by: Paul Merton; Suki Webster
- Directed by: Paul Merton
- Theme music composer: Neil Brand
- Country of origin: United Kingdom
- Original language: English
- No. of series: 1
- No. of episodes: 3

Production
- Executive producer: Michael Poole
- Producer: Kate Broome
- Running time: 58 min.
- Production company: BBC

Original release
- Network: BBC Two
- Release: 27 May – 10 June 2011

Paul Merton's Birth of Hollywood is a 2011 BBC documentary series written, directed and presented by Paul Merton. The three-part series traces the rise of the American film-making industry in Hollywood from the early years of film-making to the foundation of the major motion-picture studios and the new class of the film star.

== Episodes ==
No.	Title	Original release date	Viewers (millions)
1	"Episode 1"	27 May 2011	2.03
Episode one follows the rise of the American industry from its beginnings with Thomas Edison and his Motion Picture Patents Company, and looks at figures such as the Biograph girl Mary Pickford, the controversial film pioneer D.W. Griffith, the origins of Charlie Chaplin, the foundation of United Artists and the industry's move from New York to the orange groves of Hollywood, California.
2	"Episode 2"	3 June 2011	1.73
Moving towards the 1920s, Merton examines how conservative American lobbyists, fresh from obtaining prohibition, now turned their attention to the unregulated film industry. Merton views this through a study of the career of the silent film star Roscoe Arbuckle and how a false accusation led to his expulsion from the industry and as an excuse for instigating film self-censorship. Meanwhile, Merton looks at the effect of the First World War and the flamboyance of directors such as Cecil B. DeMille.
3	"Episode 3"	10 June 2011	1.54
The rise of the Hollywood film studios in the 1930s is told through the story of Metro-Goldwyn-Mayer. MGM's powerful young producer, Irving Thalberg, challenged the power of the director in making films and refused to allow his own name to appear in his films' credits.
