= Ross Kemp: Extreme World series 5 =

Ross Kemp: Extreme World
- Season 5
- Starring: Ross Kemp
- No. of episodes: 6

Release
- Original network: Sky One
- Original release: 14 July – 5 October 2016

Series chronology
- ← Previous; Series 4 Next → Series 6

The fifth series of Ross Kemp: Extreme World, BAFTA-winning documentary maker Ross Kemp and his Extreme World team return to reveal the human stories behind the world's toughest issues.

== Production ==
Filming for the fifth series was announced via Kemp's Twitter account; it began in September 2015 before Kemp took a break during the Christmas season. Filming continued in April 2016 after Kemp had finished filming his brief return for BBC One's EastEnders.

The fifth series was made up of six 60 minutes episodes and aired from July to October 2016.

== Episodes ==
No. overall	No. in series	Title	Original release date	UK viewers (millions)
1	25	"Special: The Fight Against ISIS"	14 July 2016	0.80
Kemp travels across Syria and Iraq to discover the impact that ISIS has caused on the day-to-day lives of the country's natives. He heads out onto the frontline with a group of Kurds known as the YPG and YPJ, who despite being untrained and under-funded, have gained more ground on ISIS than any other armed militia since their invasion.
2	26	"Mongolia"	7 September 2016	0.35
Kemp speaks with Mongolian nationalists who are enthralled in the ongoing fight to prevent rich Chinese businessman from stealing all of their country's remaining wealth. He spends a day with a group of coal miners forced to work in appalling conditions, as well as meeting a group of homeless herdsmen who are reduced to living on a landfill site.
3	27	"Mexico"	14 September 2016	0.42
Kemp visits a border town on the edge of the Mexico–US border, where more than a thousand migrants attempt to get into the United States every day. He patrols with border officials as they hunt for a group of migrants attempting to cross the border in the desert, and asks if a 2,000 mile long wall will ever be the answer to prevent increasing migration.
4	28	"Mozambique"	21 September 2016	N/A
Kemp travels to Mozambique to investigate the ever-increasing trade of ivory. He meets with a group of illegal salesman to find out just how easy the purchase of Ivory actually is, before taking a road trip into the Neassa reserve with a group of rangers enlisted with the specific task of protecting the remaining Elephant population from attack.
5	29	"Colombia"	28 September 2016	N/A
Kemp investigates the mass production of Cocaine in the poorest parts of Colombia, meeting with members of rival factions FARC and the Paramilitaries to find out how the drugs trade has united the deadliest of rivals. He visits a private Cocaine production plant and finds out just how much the natives rely on drug production to survive.
6	30	"Syria"	5 October 2016	N/A
A summarised version of 'The Fight Against ISIS', featuring footage shot in Syria only. This version also features footage not featured in the original broadcast.

== Ratings ==
Episode	Date	Official Sky One rating (In millions)	Sky One weekly rank	Total Sky One viewers
Episode 1	14 July 2016	0.80	N/A	N/A
Episode 2	7 September 2016	0.35	N/A	N/A
Episode 3	14 september 2016	0.42	N/A	N/A
Episode 4	21 september 2016	N/A	N/A	N/A
Episode 5	28 September 2016	N/A	N/A	N/A
Episode 6	5 October 2016	N/A	N/A	N/A
Series average				
