= Gerald Seymour =

British writer

Gerald Seymour (born 25 November 1941 in Guildford, Surrey) is a British writer of crime and espionage novels.

== Early life ==
Gerald Seymour was born to William Kean Seymour and his second wife, Rosalind Wade. He was educated at Kelly College, now known as Mount Kelly in Tavistock, Devon, and took a BA Hons degree in Modern History at University College London.

== Career ==
Initially a journalist, he joined ITN in 1963, covering such topics as the Great Train Robbery, Vietnam War, The Troubles, the Munich Olympics massacre, Germany's Red Army Faction, Italy's Red Brigades and Palestinian militant groups. His first book, Harry's Game, was published in 1975, and Seymour then became a full-time novelist, living in the West Country. In 1999, he featured in the Oscar-winning documentary, One Day in September, which portrayed the Munich massacre. He has been a full-time writer since 1978.

Television adaptations have been made of his books Harry's Game, The Glory Boys, The Contract, Red Fox, The Informant based on Field of Blood, A Line in the Sand and The Waiting Time.

== Bibliography ==
- Harry's Game (1975) ISBN 0-00-221866-6
- The Glory Boys (1976) ISBN 0-00-222399-6
- Kingfisher (1977) ISBN 0-00-222353-8
- Red Fox (1979) ISBN 0-00-221444-X, published in the US as The Harrison Affair
- The Contract (1980) ISBN 0-00-221998-0
- Archangel (1982) ISBN 0-00-222621-9
- In Honour Bound (1984) ISBN 0-00-222764-9
- Field of Blood (1985) ISBN 0-00-222870-X
- A Song in the Morning (1986), ISBN 0-00-223106-9, published in the US as Shadow on the Sun
- At Close Quarters (1987), ISBN 0-00-271013-7, published in the US as An Eye for an Eye
- Home Run (1989) ISBN 0-00-271018-8, published in the US as The Running Target
- Condition Black (1991), ISBN 0-00-271176-1
- The Journeyman Tailor (1992), ISBN 0-00-271233-4
- The Fighting Man (1993), ISBN 0-00-224305-9
- The Heart of Danger (1995), ISBN 0-00-225009-8
- Killing Ground (1997), ISBN 0-593-04098-8
- The Waiting Time (1998), ISBN 0-593-04211-5, published in the US as Dead Ground
- A Line in the Sand (1999), ISBN 0-593-04459-2
- Holding the Zero (2000), ISBN 0-593-04425-8
- The Untouchable (2001), ISBN 0-593-04650-1
- Traitor's Kiss (2003), ISBN 0-593-05091-6
- The Unknown Soldier (2004) ISBN 0-593-05258-7
- Rat Run (2005) ISBN 0-593-05508-X
- The Walking Dead (2007) ISBN 978-0-593-05754-4
- Time Bomb (2008) ISBN 978-0-593-06005-6
- The Collaborator (2009) ISBN 978-0-340-91886-9
- The Dealer and the Dead (2010) ISBN 0-340-91890-X
- A Deniable Death (2011) ISBN 978-1-4447-0586-7
- The Outsiders (2012) ISBN 978-1-444-70588-1
- The Corporal's Wife (2013) ISBN 978-1-444-75857-3
- Vagabond (2014) ISBN 978-1-444-75859-7
- No Mortal Thing (2015) ISBN 978-1444758634
- Jericho's War (2017) ISBN 978-1473617735
- A Damned Serious Business (2018) ISBN 978-1473663480
- Battle Sight Zero (2019) ISBN 978-1473663541
- Beyond Recall (2020) ISBN 978-1529386004
- The Crocodile Hunter (2021) ISBN 978-1529386042
- The Foot Soldiers (2022) ISBN 978-1529340440
- In At The Kill (2023) ISBN 978-1529340457
- The Best Revenge (2024)
- A Duty of Care (2025)
