= Paul Merton =

English comedian (born 1957)

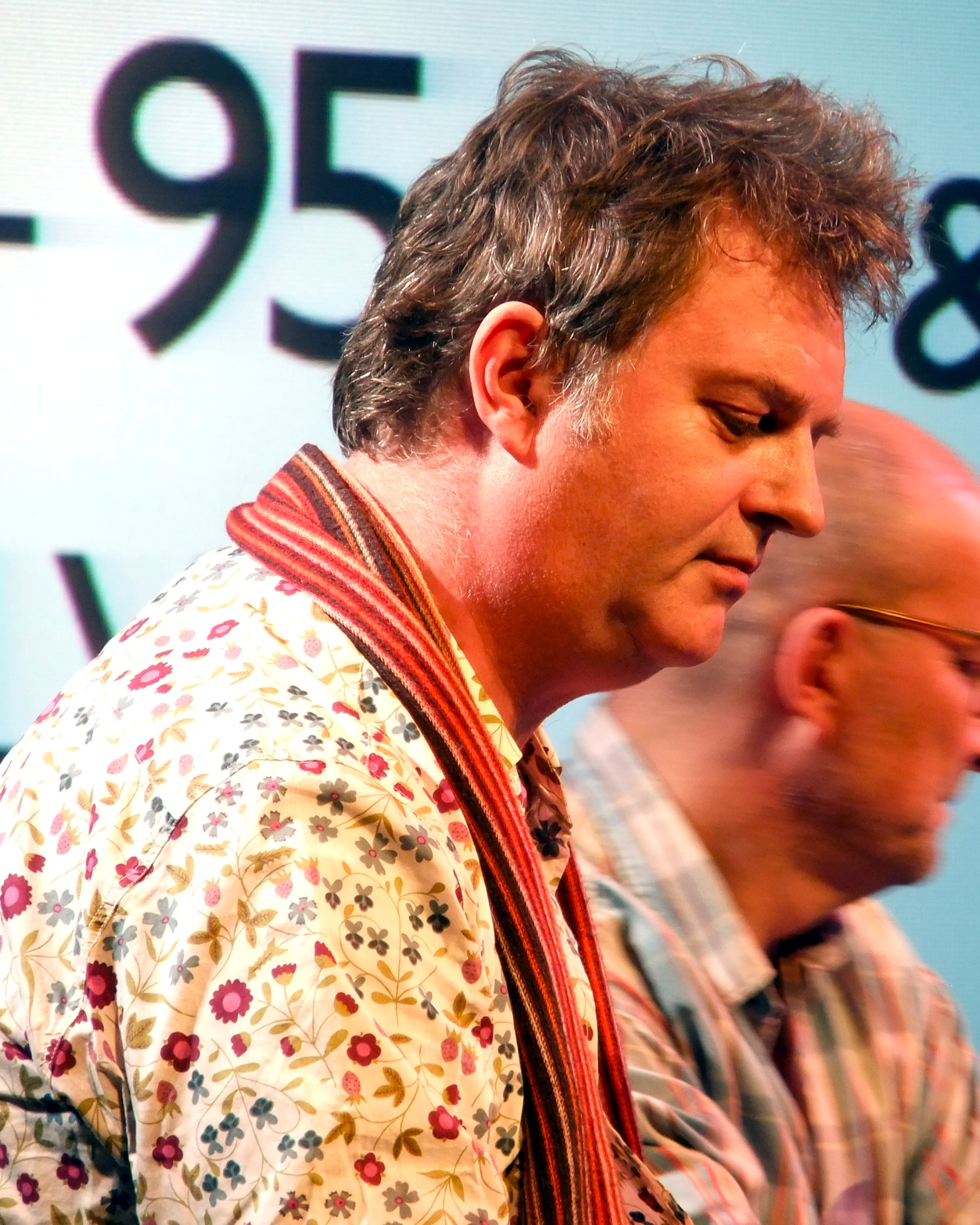
- Merton in 2010
- Born: Paul James Martin; 9 July 1957 (age 69); Parsons Green, London, England
- Notable work: Whose Line Is It Anyway? (1988–1993); Just a Minute (1989 onwards); Have I Got News for You (1990 onwards); Paul Merton: The Series (1991–1993); Room 101 (TV) (1999–2007); Paul Merton in China (2007); Paul Merton in India (2008); Paul Merton in Europe (2010); Room 101 (radio) (2023 onwards)
- Spouses: Caroline Quentin (m. 1990; div. 1998) Sarah Parkinson (m. 2003; died 2003) Suki Webster (m. 2009)

Comedy career
- Years active: 1982–present
- Medium: Stand-up, television, radio
- Genres: Surreal humour, observational comedy, improvisational comedy, physical comedy, satire, deadpan
- Subjects: Politics, everyday life, celebrities, pop culture, depression, marriage, self-deprecation, human interaction, current events

Paul James Martin (born 9 July 1957), known by the stage name Paul Merton, is an English comedian, actor, broadcaster and director who is best known as one of the two regular panellists on the television show Have I Got News for You.

Merton is known for his improvisation skill, and his humour is rooted in deadpan, surreal and sometimes dark comedy. Critics, fellow comedians and viewers have ranked him among Britain's greatest comedians. He made his breakthrough in the late 1980s as a regular performer on the original British version of the comedy improvisation show Whose Line Is It Anyway?, and has been a team captain on Have I Got News for You since it began in 1990. He was also the host of Room 101 from 1999 to 2007, replacing original host Nick Hancock.

Merton appears as a panellist regularly on Radio 4's Just a Minute, first appearing in 1989, and became the only remaining regular panellist in 2009 following the death of Clement Freud. He has also appeared as one of the Comedy Store's Comedy Store Players.

== Early life ==
Paul James Martin was born on 9 July 1957 in Parsons Green, west London, to an English Anglican father, Albert Martin (a train driver on the London Underground), and an Irish Catholic mother, Mary Ann Power (a medical nurse). It was revealed on Who Do You Think You Are? that Merton's maternal grandfather, James Power, was from Passage East in County Waterford and served in the British Army in the First World War. He then left to join the Irish Republican Army during the Irish War of Independence, serving as an IRA volunteer with the rank of 1st lieutenant in the East Waterford Brigade.

Merton lived in the London Borough of Hammersmith and Fulham until 8 years old. Merton attended St Thomas's School, Fulham and St Teresa's, Morden ("being sent to Coventry at school"). He then went to Wimbledon College, a Jesuit-run secondary school that was formerly a grammar school and had just become a comprehensive, in a stream for boys who had failed the 11-plus, and he passed A-levels in English and History.

After leaving school, Merton worked at the Tooting employment office as a clerical officer for three years, quitting in February 1980.

Merton auditioned for the Royal Academy of Dramatic Arts at 19 years old.

== Career ==
Merton has stated that he was inspired to go into comedy at an early age watching clowns at a circus, remembering, "I don't think I'd seen clowns before. I'd certainly never seen adults behave like this...From that evening, I wanted to be part of the process that was making all those people laugh." He gained his earliest professional credits under his birth name, including an appearance as a yokel in the episode Time of The Young Ones in 1984. On joining Equity he found that the name Paul Martin was already taken by a juggler in Leeds, so he renamed himself after Merton, the district of London where he grew up.

=== Stage ===
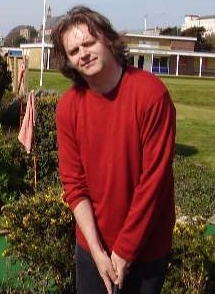
Merton in 1998

Though he had harboured serious ambitions of becoming a performing comedian since his school days, it was not until April 1982, at the Comedy Store in Soho, that his dream was realised. Merton commented that he made his professional debut, along with writing partner John Irwin, in Swansea in 1982 which led to having an "affection for Wales". "What we did over the course of two weeks was perform 10 shows and it meant that our first time on stage if we made a mistake on the Monday we wouldn't repeat that mistake the next day."

Merton recalls that on only his second or third night he found the dour role that has informed his comic approach ever since. After performing on the London Alternative Comedy circuit at places like The Comedy Store and Jongleurs, in 1985 his first foray to the Edinburgh Fringe Festival was with the show Have You Been on Telly where he shared the bill with Morris Minor and the Majors and Mark Steel. He has been a member of the London improvisation group The Comedy Store Players since 1985, and still regularly performs with them.

Merton has performed in Paul Merton's Impro Chums at Pleasance as part of the Edinburgh Comedy Festival every year from 2008.

Merton was due to make his West End debut in the 2021 revival of Hairspray at the London Coliseum. However, after several delays to the show it was confirmed that Merton would not be joining the company.

=== Radio ===
In the late 1980s, Merton appeared on BBC Radio 4's The Big Fun Show. After long-time Just a Minute panellist Kenneth Williams died in 1988, Merton (a fan of the show) contacted the producer at the suggestion of the host, Nicholas Parsons. He was invited to participate during the following year and has appeared regularly on the programme ever since. In 2016 Merton overtook Williams to become the second most regular panellist, surpassed only by Clement Freud.

Besides his work on Just a Minute, Merton was a semi-regular guest on I'm Sorry I Haven't a Clue from 1991 to 1998. Between 1993 and 1995, Merton was among the regular cast members on the Radio 4 improvisational comedy series The Masterson Inheritance. In 2000 he presented Two Priests and a Nun Go into a Pub, in which he interviewed British and Irish comedians who had (like Merton himself) been brought up as members of the Roman Catholic Church. In 2009, Merton started a Radio 4 series in which he reads Spike Milligan's war memoirs in an audio-book fashion.

=== Television ===
Merton's breakthrough as a television performer came in 1988 with Channel 4's improvised comedy show Whose Line Is It Anyway?, which moved to TV from BBC Radio 4, though he had previously performed on the channel's Saturday Live and compered its series Comedy Wavelength in 1987. He remained on Whose Line until 1993. Have I Got News for You began in 1990, and two series of his own sketch show, Paul Merton: The Series, followed soon after. In 1995 he presented a documentary series celebrating the history of the London Palladium, entitled Paul Merton's Palladium Story. In 1996, Merton performed updated versions of fifteen of Ray Galton and Alan Simpson's old scripts for an ITV series, Paul Merton in Galton & Simpson's.... Six of these scripts were previously performed by Tony Hancock. These were very badly received by critics, and although a selection of episodes was initially released on VHS, it was not until June 2007 that the complete series was released on DVD.

Also in 1996, Merton took a break from Have I Got News for You during its eleventh series, making only one appearance as a guest on fellow captain Ian Hislop's team. Merton later said that at the time he was "very tired" of the show and that he thought it had become "stuck in a rut". Nevertheless, he added that he felt his absence gave the programme the "shot in the arm" it needed and that it had been "better ever since". In 2002, following allegations in the UK tabloids linking the show's chairman, Angus Deayton, with prostitutes and drug use, the host was asked to resign from the show. Merton hosted the first episode after Deayton's departure and was described as "merciless" in his treatment of his former co-star.

In 1998 and 2001, Merton had the role as the voice of Dr. Dogg in the Aardman comedy series Rex the Runt.

In 1999 Merton replaced Nick Hancock as host of Room 101, a chat show in which guests are offered the chance to discuss their pet hates and consign them to the oblivion of Room 101. His first guest was Hancock. He hosted 64 editions. In 2007, his final guest was Ian Hislop (who became the first interviewee to appear twice, having also been on an edition with Hancock). Hislop's selections deliberately included items that Merton was known to like, such as The Beatles and the films of Charlie Chaplin. Hislop's final choice was Merton himself, done to represent his departure from the show. Merton cast himself in the room to end the show, although on the condition that Hislop would go in with him.

Merton is one of the recurring stars from the 4 ITV Pantos. His best role came in 1999, where Merton starred alongside Ronnie Corbett as one of the ugly sisters in ITV's Christmas pantomime of Cinderella. His other co-stars were Julian Clary, Samantha Janus, Ben Miller, Harry Hill, Frank Skinner and Alexander Armstrong. In the same year – to coincide with the launch of his first stand up tour in 10 years, and this is me...Paul Merton – he was given his own one hour South Bank Show special. The show charted his beginnings in the comedy business, to the development of his improvisational skills, his mental breakdown, and the popularity of Have I Got News For You.

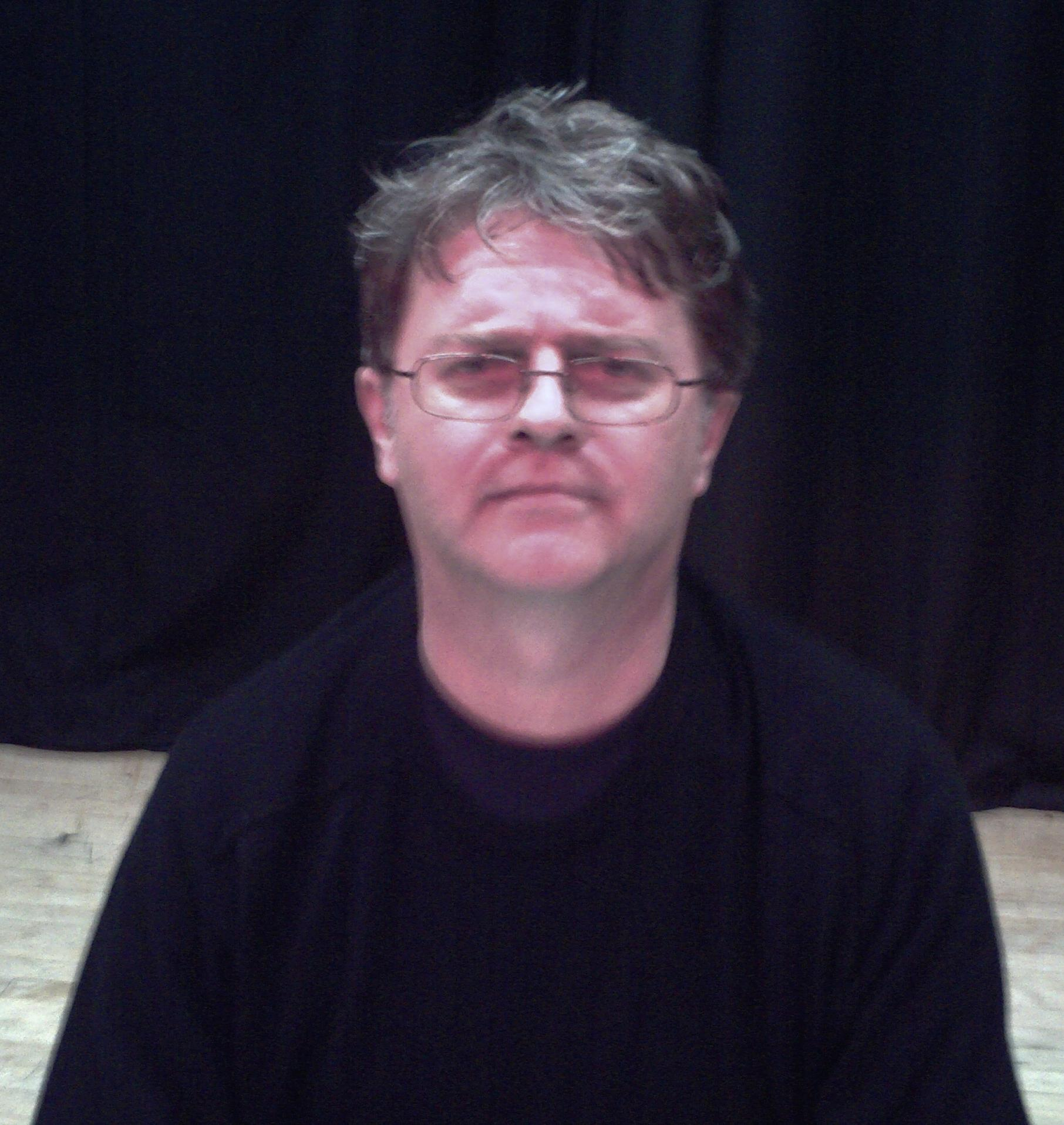
Merton at Ely Maltings in 2007, after giving a talk on his book Silent Comedy

He was rumoured to be a possible new host of Countdown to replace both Richard Whiteley and his successor, Des Lynam, but decided not to pursue this.

Merton is a keen student of comedy, particularly the early silent comedians and in 2006, BBC Four broadcast Paul Merton's Silent Clowns, a four-part documentary series on the silent comedy craft of Buster Keaton, Charlie Chaplin, Laurel and Hardy and Harold Lloyd. He examined their respective careers, interspersed with moments from a live show in which he presented clips of their work. Among the audience were many children, who were seeing the performers for the first time. Merton took a stage version of this show to the 2006 Edinburgh Fringe Festival and in late 2007 took the show on a UK tour. A tie-in book, Silent Comedy, was written by Merton and published by RH Books in late 2007. The Independent described it as "clearly a labour of love" but criticised the exhaustive and overly-thorough plot synopses of the films discussed.

Also in 2007 Merton presented a four-part travel documentary, Paul Merton in China, which was broadcast on Five from 21 May 2007. His second travel series, Paul Merton in India was transmitted from 8 October 2008 on the same channel. A third series, Paul Merton in Europe began broadcasting on 11 January 2010, again on Five. In 2015 he was commissioned by More4 to present Paul Merton’s Secret Stations, a travel documentary series about some of Britain's little-used request stop railway stations inspired by travel writer Dixe Wills' book Tiny Stations.

In 2009, Paul wrote and presented Morecambe and Wise: The Show What Paul Merton Did.

Merton hosted the British version of Thank God You're Here, which aired on ITV in 2008. In 2009, Merton directed and presented a documentary on the British films of Alfred Hitchcock, in a series of star-presented documentaries on BBC Four. In May 2010, Merton temporarily co-presented The One Show after Adrian Chiles left the show.

His three-part documentary series Paul Merton's Birth of Hollywood about the early history of Hollywood was broadcast in May 2011 on BBC2. In Merton's third TV series for 2011, Paul Merton's Adventures, he travels around the world going on popular tourist trails, but still manages to find some extraordinary things.

In 2021, Merton returned to Channel 5 for a new travel show, Motorhoming with Merton & Webster, a 6-part hour-long series which sees Merton travelling around Britain with his wife Suki Webster in a camper van.

In October 2023, Merton appeared on an episode of Celebrity Antiques Road Trip with his wife Suki.

In 2024, Merton appeared as the guest on the programme Perfect Pub Walks with Bill Bailey. Merton and Bill Bailey walked, talked and visited pubs on the Isle of Purbeck in Dorset.

In September 2025, Channel4 announced that Merton will present Paul Merton: Driving Amazing Trains, an upcoming six-part series.

== Personal life ==
Merton married actress Caroline Quentin in 1990; they announced their separation in April 1997, which was followed by divorce in 1998. Merton had a relationship with producer and actress Sarah Parkinson; they were married unofficially in a service in the Maldives in 2000. They were officially married in June 2003, three months before her death from breast cancer on 23 September 2003. He married fellow improviser Suki Webster in 2009 and they live in Sudbury, Suffolk.

Shortly before becoming a household name on Have I Got News for You, Merton booked himself into the Maudsley psychiatric hospital for six weeks, because of psychiatric problems caused by the malaria medicine Lariam. In an interview with The Guardian he was reported to have been "hallucinating conversations with friends, and became convinced he was a target for the Freemasons".

He used his experiences at Maudsley as a key framework in his 2012 tour, Out of My Head. He gave many examples of his misadventures there, conversations with staff and fellow patients were played out as sketches with his fellow performers, Richard Vranch, Lee Simpson and Suki Webster. He stated that, during his time at the Maudsley, he was simultaneously appearing in Whose Line Is It Anyway? on Channel 4.

Merton is a supporter of Tottenham Hotspur.

== Acclaim and awards ==
In a 2007 public poll featured in The Guardian, Merton was voted alongside the likes of Oscar Wilde, Spike Milligan, Noël Coward and Winston Churchill as one of the ten greatest wits of all time. The Comedian's Comedian, a 2005 Channel 4 poll of fellow comedians, saw him voted among the top twenty greatest international comedians in history, with host Jimmy Carr crediting him for being "responsible for more great lines than Angus Deayton's dealer". The Observer's "The A–Z of Laughter", a 2003 special compiled by expert judges which featured the 50 funniest acts in British comedy by letter, applauded Merton for "bringing to Have I Got News for You a genuine surrealism that cuts through the clubbable smugness".

Merton has accumulated multiple awards and honours. After seven BAFTA Award nominations for "Best Entertainment Performance", he finally won the award in 2003, defeating fellow Have I Got News for You star Angus Deayton, who had been dismissed from the show the previous October. He has since been nominated for a further three awards – a total of eleven nominations – including a nomination for his travel documentary Paul Merton in China. Merton's appearances on Have I Got News for You have seen him nominated for five British Comedy Awards, winning the 1992 "Top TV Comedy Personality" and 1999 "Best Comedy Entertainment Personality" awards. He has also shared a further three British Comedy Awards with the panel and crew of the show, winning "Best new TV comedy" in 1991, "Best comedy gameshow" in 1999 and "Best Comedy Panel Show" in 2009. He received the 2004 Broadcasting Press Guild Award for "Best Non-Acting Performer", also for his work on Have I Got News for You.

In 2008, Merton presented Bruce Forsyth with a BAFTA Fellowship: Forsyth had given Merton his Best Entertainment Performance award in 2003.

== Works ==
Merton has written or co-authored five books:

- Julian Clary; Paul Merton (1989). The Joan Collins' Fan Club. Papermac. ISBN 978-0-333-49926-9.
- Paul Merton (1993). Paul Merton's history of the twentieth century. ISBN 978-1-85283-570-5.
- Merton, Paul (1995). My Struggle. Boxtree. ISBN 9780752207759.
- Paul Merton (2007). Silent Comedy. Random House UK. ISBN 978-1-905211-70-8.
- Paul Merton (2014). Only When I Laugh: My Autobiography. Ebury Press. ISBN 978-0-09-194935-8.
