= Ross Kemp: Extreme World =

2011 British documentary TV series

- Title card (2015—2017)
- Genre: Documentary
- Starring: Ross Kemp
- Country of origin: United Kingdom
- Original language: English
- No. of seasons: 6
- No. of episodes: 36

Production
- Executive producers: Ross Kemp; Clive Tulloh; Celia Taylor
- Producers: Tom Watson; David Herman
- Running time: 60 minutes
- Production companies: Tiger Aspect Productions and Mongoose Productions

Original release
- Network: Sky 1
- Release: 21 February 2011 – 12 August 2017

Related
- Ross Kemp: Battle for the Amazon; Ross Kemp's Britain

Ross Kemp: Extreme World is a British documentary series that has been broadcast on Sky 1 since 21 February 2011. Hosted by actor Ross Kemp, the series follows Kemp and a film crew around the world as they explore various forms of hardship, including homelessness, illicit trade, drug addiction, violence and poverty. He frequently engages with authorities working to address the problems and attempts to establish contact with ringleaders to uncover the root causes of the issues. The show has aired a total of six series since its launch.

== Production and development ==
On 8 December 2015, it was confirmed via Kemp's official Twitter account that Extreme World would return for a fifth series, with filming beginning in the summer of 2015. Filming continued through to December, before taking a three-week break over the Christmas period. Filming restarted in January 2016. Filming once again broke in April 2016, due to Kemp filming scenes for his brief return to EastEnders. Filming on the series finished in May 2016. A sixth series has since been confirmed for broadcast in 2017, beginning with a special feature-length episode, "Libya's Migrant Hell", on 21 February 2017. However, the sixth series of Extreme World will be the last, with Sky1 having axed the series on 9 February 2017 to "make way for drama and comedy", as part of the channel's shift away from "commissioning factual entertainment".

== Transmissions ==
Series	Episodes	Originally released	
Series	Episodes	First released	Last released
1	5	21 February 2011	21 March 2011
2	6	3 September 2012	8 October 2012
3	6	21 January 2014	25 February 2014
4	7	22 January 2015	5 March 2015
5	6	14 July 2016	5 October 2016
6	6	21 February 2017	5 August 2017

== Episodes ==
=== Series 1 (2011) ===
Ross Kemp returns to present another documentary series for Sky 1 named Ross Kemp: Extreme World. The series sees Kemp travel to places like Haiti and the Congo to learn more about the consequences of the 2011 Haiti earthquake and the ongoing conflict over Congo's mineral resources..

=== Series 2 (2012) ===
In the second series, Kemp revisits his exploration of various locations, including Pakistan and East Africa. His travels take him to Karachi, where he delves into the battle for the city, and to East Africa, where he investigates the widespread belief in witchcraft.

=== Series 3 (2014) ===
Ross Kemp: Extreme World Series 3 sees Kemp gaining access to the places and people caught up in contemporary global issues. The most recent run saw Kemp examine the conflicts in Northern Ireland, poverty and corruption in Las Vegas the crack epidemic in Rio de Janeiro as well as India's huge sex-trafficking industry.

=== Series 4 (2015) ===
Series four takes Kemp on a journey to delve into a broader range of global issues. Throughout the series, he immerses himself in the world of criminal biker gangs in Australia, shadows Iraqi and Syrian immigrants in Calais, and investigates South Africa's rape epidemic, shedding light on pressing social challenges around the world.

=== Series 5 (2016) ===
In the fifth series, Kemp heads to Colombia, Kurdistan, Mozambique, Mongolia and the US/Mexico border to investigate the cocaine trade, immigration and the conflict between Kurdish militia groups and terrorist group Islamic State.

=== Series 6 (2017) ===
The sixth and final series of Extreme Worlds started airing on 21 February 2017 on Sky One, it was the final series. Kemp travels to Libya, Texas, and the Philippines to cover the migrant crisis, right-wing extremists and the hard-line stance against drug traffickers and uses taken by former President of the Philippines, Rodrigo Duterte.

== Home media ==
The first two seasons of Ross Kemp: Extreme Worlds have been released on to DVD. The first series was released in region 2 only on the 28 March 2011. The second series was released onto DVD in both regions 1 and 2 on the 19 November 2012.
