= L'Hôtel =

Luxury hotel in Paris, France

Coordinates: 48°51′23″N 2°20′06″E

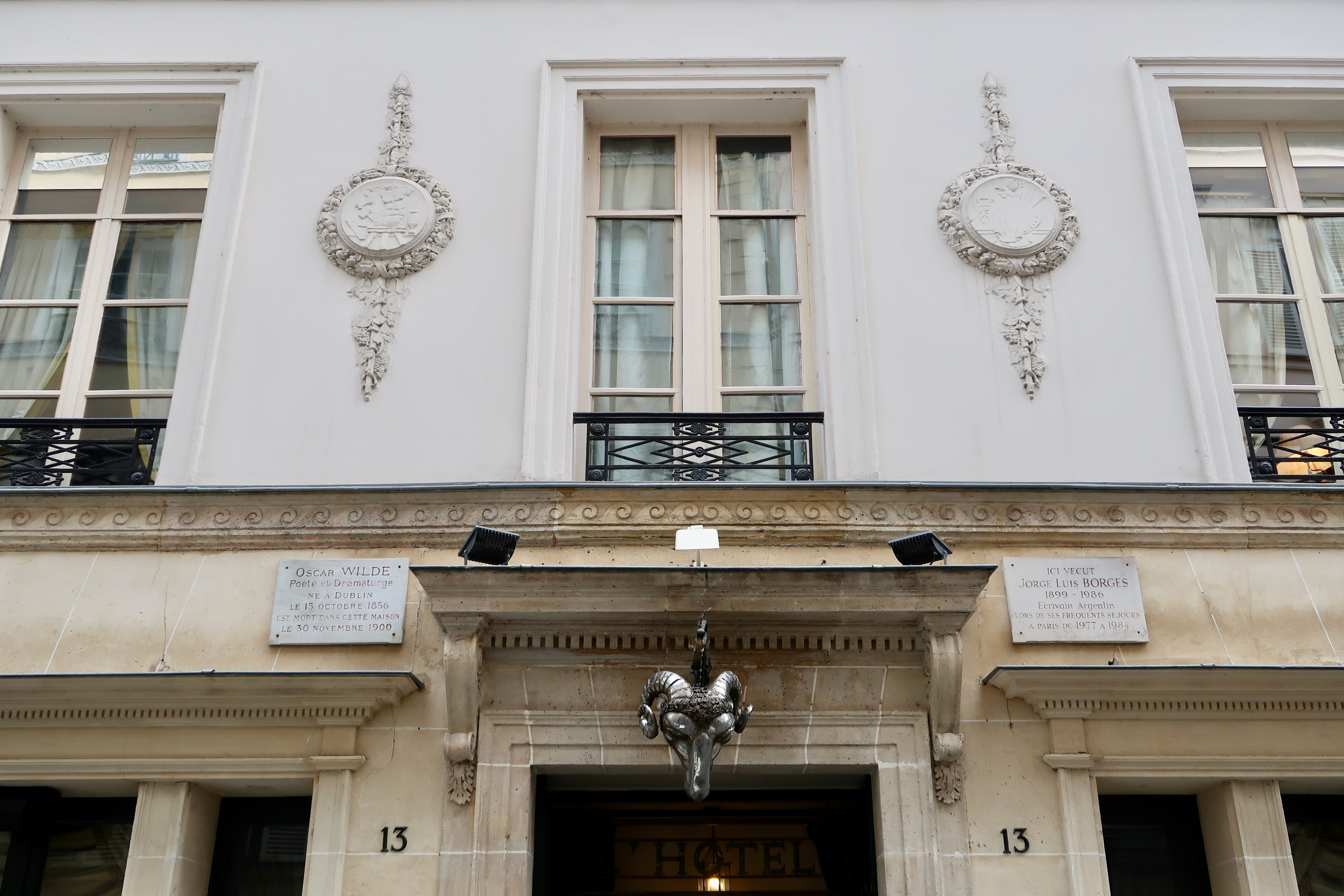
- Exterior facade of the building.

General information
- Location: 13 Rue des Beaux-Arts, 6th arrondissement of Paris, Paris
- Year built: 1828

Technical details
- Floor count: 6

Website
- https://www.l-hotel.com/

L'Hôtel is a 5-star luxury hotel in Saint-Germain-des-Prés, Paris. It was built in the 19th century and has had various names, Hôtel d’Allemagne, then Hôtel d’Alsace (after the Franco-Prussian War), and was renamed L'Hôtel in 1963. The hotel is located along 13 Rue des Beaux Arts, 75006 Paris, France.

Oscar Wilde spent his last months there in 1900, when it was known as the Hôtel d'Alsace. The hotel appears to have been run-down at the time, but Wilde remarked "I am dying beyond my means".

Other former residents included Marlon Brando, actress and singer Mistinguett, and the blind writer Jorge Luis Borges, who said it seemed to have been "sculpted by a cabinet maker". The hosting of Borges in this hotel was not by chance: when he was nine, he translated Wilde's "The Happy Prince" into Spanish and since then he has become a follower of his work; Borges wanted to die where the writer of his childhood had also died. (Borges actually died in Geneva, however.)

American celebrity chef and author Anthony Bourdain wrote that it is the only hotel in Paris which he would stay at, describing it as "a love shack to the tragically hip for ages".

== Gallery ==
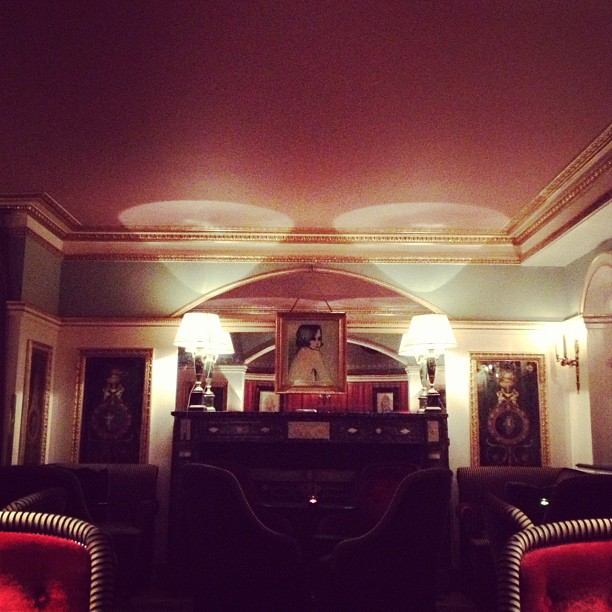
Hotel bar

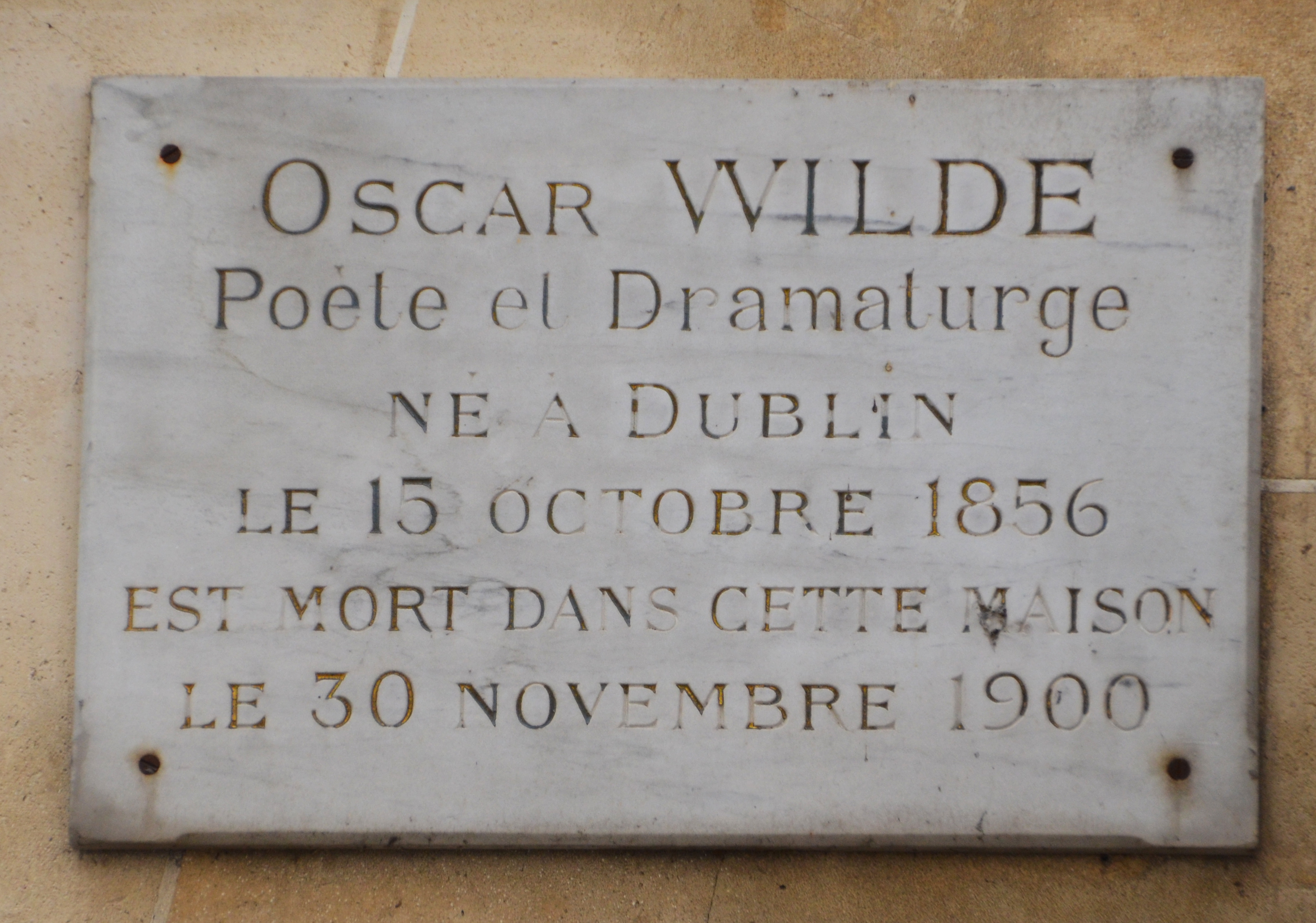
Oscar Wilde's final address was at the then dingy Hôtel d'Alsace (now known as L'Hôtel), in Paris. The plaque has the year of Wilde's birth wrong—he was born in 1854.

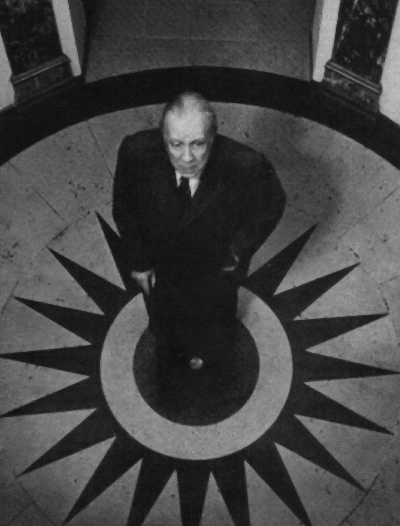
Borges in L'Hôtel (Paris, 1969)
