= Ross Kemp in Afghanistan =

2008 British documentary TV series

- Also known as: Return to Afghanistan; Middle East; Back on the Frontline
- Genre: Documentary
- Directed by: John Conroy and Anuar Arroyo
- Presented by: Ross Kemp
- Country of origin: United Kingdom
- Original language: English
- No. of series: 4
- No. of episodes: 18

Production
- Running time: 60 minutes (inc. adverts)
- Production companies: Tiger Aspect Productions and Mongoose Productions

Original release
- Network: Sky 1
- Release: 21 January 2008 – 12 November 2012

Related
- Ross Kemp on Gangs; Ross Kemp in Search of Pirates

Ross Kemp in Afghanistan is a Sky One British documentary series fronted by actor Ross Kemp about the British soldiers fighting in the War in Afghanistan as part of the International Security Assistance Force (ISAF) mission against the Taliban. The first two series involved Kemp and a small embedded film crew following troops fighting in Helmand Province, documenting their part in the ongoing Operation Herrick.

The first series, first broadcast in January 2008, followed the 2007 deployment of the 1st Battalion (1 Royal Anglians, "The Vikings") of the Royal Anglian Regiment. As a follow-up to the first series, Ross Kemp: Return to Afghanistan, first broadcast from 1 February 2009, followed the 2008 deployment of the Argyll and Sutherland Highlanders (5 Scots), the 5th battalion of the Royal Regiment of Scotland. Kemp and his crew participate in the Vikings' (Royal Anglians) initial training in Britain for the deployment. They then visit the unit during their six-month tour, filming both life at rest and on fighting patrols in Helmand. The series finally covers their return to the UK. In the second series, Kemp returns to Afghanistan to assess how the conflict has changed since his first visit in 2007.

A special two-part third series, entitled Middle East, follows Kemp as he visits soldiers working in Gaza and Israel. In the fourth series, Back on the Frontline, Kemp returns to the frontline with the Royal Marines as he re-visits Afghanistan two years after he last departed, to see how the country has progressed since his last visit. A final special, broadcast in 2012, entitled The Invisible Wounded, follows soldiers as they return home from Afghanistan, some of whom are forced to deal with the aftermath of PTSD.

Unlike a "traditional" war documentary, the first series was firmly positioned by Kemp as being the "soldiers' story", focusing on the experiences of the soldiers at home and abroad, and also features the views of their families. With a personal connection with the Vikings, Kemp is an ardent supporter of the men and the mission, and his film makes many criticisms of the situation the soldiers find themselves in.

During the filming of the first series, in one engagement the crew were pinned down by fire from the Taliban, with Kemp "nearly dying" with bullets passing "within inches". In filming the second series, Kemp runs into a possible minefield. The show was praised for the closeness and realism of the battle footage, and is believed to be the first documentary of its kind filmed in high definition.

== Episode list ==
=== Transmissions ===
| Series | Airdates | # of episodes | DVD release date | DVD notes |
|---|---|---|---|---|
| 1: Ross Kemp in Afghanistan | 21 January — 18 February 2008 | 5 | 7 April 2008 | Contains all five episodes. |
| 2: Return to Afghanistan | 1 February — 1 March 2009 | 5 | 6 April 2009 | Contains all five episodes. |
| 3: Middle East | 3 January — 10 January 2010 | 2 | 19 April 2010 | Contains both episodes. |
| 4: Back on the Frontline | 14 November — 12 December 2011 | 5 | 16 January 2012 | Contains all five episodes. |
| Special: The Invisible Wounded | 12 November 2012 | 1 | —N/a | This special has never been released on DVD. |

== Background ==
=== Motivation ===
Kemp expressed that the a main motivation for the series was to hear from the soldiers who generally don't have a voice compared to other public workers. Kemp stated: "I've got many friends who are in the services, but you never really hear a squaddie giving his point of view. I'd never heard one talk publicly and I wanted to hear that voice." This would be the view of the young men being sent to the foreign climes of Afghanistan from a situation such as being 18 years old and still living at home with mum and dad, as opposed to hearing from officers trained in media relations. The series would examine the experiences of soldiers at home, injured soldiers and the families of serving soldiers. Kemp wanted to ascertain the motivation of the troops, their level of political knowledge about the situation, their views on Muslims. Kemp stated his opinion that the public gaining an understanding of what it's like for the soldiers is a good thing whatever anyone's political views on the war., informing the public what was happening out there and what the soldiers are doing for the people back home who are "fortunate to live in a free country".

=== Setting up ===
The idea of the documentary was first thought of by Kemp around January 2005, after the series on Gangs when he came up with the idea of embedding himself with a unit. Kemp had initially wanted to do a series about troops in Iraq following the 2003 invasion and posed the idea to James Murdoch, head of Sky TV. Due to the prevailing sensitive political situation, the MOD were reluctant. as it was around the time of the controversial death of David Kelly.

After repeated enquiries to the MOD, they suggested and later approved a series in Afghanistan. The program also had support of a brigadier who had gone to school with one of the programme's makers. The commanding officer of the Anglians initially approved filming of the training by the crew on a probationary basis. The crew were subsequently deemed to have "handled ourselves reasonably well" and were allowed to go on the deployment.

=== Kemp's personal link to Anglians ===
The Anglians were chosen as Kemp has a twofold personal interest in the Vikings. His father saw active service as part of the Anglians in the 1950s, and had served in one of the Royal Anglians predecessor units, the Royal Norfolk Regiment, for four years in Cyprus. Kemp also claimed to have an affinity with the soldiers in the Royal Anglians, as having grown up in Essex/East Anglia, he had the same background and possessed shared life experiences as the troops who fall in the Anglians' recruiting area, albeit with an age difference. Kemp at 43 is significantly older than the current generation of front line troops, who are invariably very young, several just 18 years old.

== Series in detail ==
=== Synopsis ===
The series follows the soldiers of B Company of the 1st Battalion on their training for deployment, on fighting operations, as well as examining life and conditions at the Now Zad front line base. At times the Taliban are no more than 50 metres away. The series also features interviews with soldiers and their families while still in England before deployment; with the mother of the Anglians' first casualty in Afghanistan, killed in May 2007 in a firefight at Nawzad; with the family of one of the men killed in the friendly fire incident; and with a corporal who survived the bombing. The series runs until the soldiers return to the UK.

=== Timeline ===
The crew trained with the battalion in January 2007 for eight weeks at Pirbright barracks, Surrey, and Salisbury Plain, Wiltshire, in a cold British winter in freezing temperatures, three months prior to deployment for real. From March - August 2007 as part of 12th Mechanised Brigade, the 1st Battalion was deployed to the Helmand province of Afghanistan as part of Operation Lastay Kulang (Pashto for "pickaxe-handle".), the sixth phase of the ongoing Operation Herrick. During this six-month tour The Battalion's activities ranged from protecting convoys and guarding the Kajaki Dam to house to house clearances in Taliban held villages during major offensives in the Sangin Valley At one point the soldiers are fighting for 23 days straight between rest periods. The crew spent two months in Afghanistan in three separate spells. The crew first arrived at Camp Bastion in Helmand Province, the main British base in Afghanistan, before moving on to forward operating bases at Lashkar Gah, Sangin and Nawzad.

On arrival at Bastion, the crew are given a medical briefing before immediately accompanying an offensive operation in the 'green zone', a thin strip of farm land along the banks of the Helmand River, during which a corporal is killed when an improvised explosive device blows up his vehicle. While the crew is back in England, three soldiers are killed in a friendly fire incident. Eight days after, the crew returned to Afghanistan for a second tour in late August for three weeks. On returning to the UK, Kemp met Defence Secretary Des Browne and gave MPs a preview of the series at the House of Commons.<

=== Training ===
Training consisted among other things of sleeping out with the unit for about a month on Salisbury Plain, mock battles in a cold-war era mock Eastern European village, convoy protection, deployment from Chinook helicopters, military tactics, and what to expect while in country. In mock battles, Kemp and others were judged to have been 'killed'. In an unusual practice not known for embedded journalists with the MOD, the crew were taught how to handle and fire weapons, namely the SA80 personal rifle and .50 calibre machine gun. The crew would not be carrying weapons in the field, but the commanding officer insisted the crew were trained to be able to defend themselves in an emergency.

=== Deployment incidents ===
==== Convoy IED strike ====
On the first operation in Afghanistan, a convoy a few hours out from the main base a Viking armoured vehicle was struck by an IED, which killed a corporal. The crew were in a convoy just ahead of the struck vehicle, and had apparently driven past the location of the IED.

=== Friendly fire incident ===
On Thursday 23 August, in a "blue on blue accident", a fighting patrol north west of Kajaki was struck by friendly fire when the patrol called in close air support after they were attacked from a number of positions. Three soldiers were killed when bombs dropped by two American F-15E Strike Eagle aircraft hit their compound. The three fatalities were declared dead at the scene, while two more that were seriously injured were evacuated by helicopter to the medical facility at Camp Bastion. The series features amateur video footage of the incident taken by the soldiers at the time.

==== Major engagement ====
On his second day in Afghanistan Kemp "nearly got shot" when the crew were pinned down when accompanying B Company were ambushed in broad daylight while on an operation against Taliban compounds near Sangin. The patrol was designed to cause an engagement with the Taliban by patrolling into an area where they knew the Taliban would be likely to attack, allowing the patrol to counterattack and call in the heavy artillery. The contact started as the patrol walked into an area near Jucaylay village. The Taliban were hidden in irrigation channels in the fields and apparently knew the patrol was coming and had prepared an ambush. The contact occurred when the patrol stepped out of cover to go around a compound.

One round passed between Kemp's shoulder and head upon which Kemp stated he wet himself, although on another occasion he later claimed this may have been due to a split water pouch. The crew were pinned down by accurate fire from AK-47s and rocket-propelled grenades (RPGs), with five to seven RPGs flying over their heads by just a metre and bullets passing inches from their heads and hitting the ground either side of them. Only after fierce return fire and a delay of three or four minutes could the crew be extracted.

== Reactions of Kemp ==
On speaking about how he unwound from his experience in Afghanistan, which he described as "an unhealthy environment in many ways", On returning Kemp said "it's difficult to come back and see life the same as it was before going". "I can honestly say, after Afghanistan, I'll never take anything in my life for granted again." Kemp stated he was most proud of this series, more so than any of his previous work. He expressed hope that after the series people would appreciate the soldiers a bit better and see their bravery in coping with hard conditions.

Kemp, as he expected, was the recipient of some piss taking from the soldiers for his acting role as a staff sergeant in the SAS in Ultimate Force, a show he later described as "dreadful". He took it in good humour, recognising it as part of the way the soldiers cope with their time in theatre.

Speaking about the conditions in the theatre, Kemp explained that the soldiers in Afghanistan were experiencing more enemy fire in six months than most soldiers have faced in 25 years in intolerable conditions and stifling heat Soldiers were under "a constant threat of snipers, RPG attacks and land mines", inducing a distinct fear of IEDs or misplaced aircraft strikes. Stating that while the everyday living conditions are bad for the men, in a war zone you "don't complain about the small things" Kemp expressed surprise that his and other's beliefs that wars since the first Gulf War were now fought electronically from a distance were wrong, and combat was still contested in close contact on the ground.

He found the soldiers "intelligent, witty and very aware of the political situation." with many soldiers believe it is possible to defeat the Taliban, an improvement over the situation he perceived in Basra, Iraq. Kemp was moved to tears when told by three seriously wounded soldiers returning to base that their actions were not appreciated back home.

Some of the soldiers he had been deployed with came to see him in the Christmas pantomime season at the end of 2007, stating that it was a good way to relax after what they had been through.

Kemp criticised the "appallingly low" pay the soldiers received. Kemp was also critical of the compensation system for wounded soldiers and the "despicable" shortage of helicopters, the most important thing needed, which were unavailable purely for monetary reasons, but which ultimately had cost lives on the tour. Kemp found that kit was unsuitable for desert ops, such as cold war rations and clothing deteriorating too quickly. Kemp also criticised the unfit state of Pirbright barracks living quarters.

On the time he and the crew were pinned down, Kemp stated he started praying, "cowering in the dirt with fear", wanting the ground to swallow him up "I was so scared..." "The most frightening experience of my life..." I will never forget that day face down in a field for the rest of my life." Speaking about the sound of bullets flying overhead, Kemp stated "you realise that nobody has ever come close to replicating the sound of bullets cutting through the air in films or on television".

However, he said the hardest thing he had to do in the series was not to be shot at in Afghanistan, but to interview the families of the dead men.

== Reception ==
On Kemp's return, even the MoD were said to be surprised when they reviewed the film as to how close to the action the filming had come. Kemp received praise from the Sergeant's Mess and from Prince Harry, who briefly served in Afghanistan as a forward air controller. It also gave some of the soldiers on the ground the chance to see how close some of the situations they were in actually are, something they don't appreciate at the time in the heat of battle.

Commentators praised how the series showed the resourcefulness and humanity of the soldiers who are fighting. Kim Sengupta, a war correspondent who has also been to Afghanistan, stated the footage was "striking and gritty" and "conveys well the sense of isolation and silence punctured by prolonged bursts of sudden ferocious violence, the fear and excitement, one experiences in the type of combat being undertaken by British forces in Afghanistan". He added it was a realistic portrayal of the events of combat, including the sheer relief of survival followed by cathartic stress relief. Sengupta also stated that the prolonged period of filming from before and after deployment allowed Kemp to realistically portray the effects of intensive close combat, where soldiers become fitter and appear to age markedly, weather-beaten, and become introspective with the so-called "thousand yard stare".

The series was criticised for not dealing with the rights or wrongs of British policy in Afghanistan, however Kemp stated "we did not go to make a so-called traditional documentary, we tried to show was what the ordinary soldiers are facing" and "My documentary is about what it is like to be a British soldier in Afghanistan." While the series was not to be a political piece according to Kemp, he did consider the Iraq invasion was "a mistake", but believed the British involvement in Afghanistan to be a just war.

== Production ==
It took a year to make the series Ross Kemp in Afghanistan

In addition to Kemp, the crew consisted of the director a cameraman and sound man with the director doubling as a second cameramen. The crew were embedded with British troops and accompanied the soldiers every single day being "in constant danger" according to Kemp. Of the crew's status in the unit, Kemp commented: "Everyone said, "The soldiers are there to protect you." F*** off! They are looking after themselves. The crew were to get no preferential treatment and experienced the same conditions and routine as the soldiers While the Vikings are a mechanized infantry unit of the 12th Mechanised Brigade, much of the filming followed dismounted operations carried out on foot.

The series was filmed in high-definition and mixed in Dolby Digital 5.1 surround sound. It is believed to be the first time a HD camera has been taken into a war zone and used in this way. The director commented: "We had long discussions about the HD cameras. The advantages are pictures of amazing sharpness, how all the awful things of war are caught in a kind of surreal colour, war in all its terrible detail. There was, of course, a price to pay for this." The HD cameras were approximately four times heavier than the cameras which are usually used for filming of this type. They are also more than 20 times more expensive, costing up to £100,000 each.

The series in Afghanistan took place in sand storms and temperatures of over 50 °C. The caustic sand was so sharp it caused nosebleeds. The crew members carried two stone (12 kg) of body armour, nine litres of water, and provisions Kemp carried the camera batteries In theatre, Kemp went deaf with an ear infection, became near-immobilised with cracked feet, and suffered a cracked tooth. He also lost two stone while making the film Having expressed concerns about his fitness and being able to cope in theatre weighed down with equipment, he stated: "you can run very quickly when someone's trying to kill you. It's very motivational."

== Total casualties of the tour ==
The 1st battalion suffered nine casualties during its tour, five of those due to hostile actions by the Taliban and four due to accidents. Kemp was travelling in a convoy in which a corporal was killed by a mine strike on his vehicle. He also witnessed the death of a private. The film was dedicated to the dead soldiers, and the men and families of the Vikings.

== Series 2 – Return to Afghanistan ==
Following the first series, Kemp's next project was to be a documentary on drugs in Thailand for Sky. Reports in September 2008 that filming of a follow-up series in Afghanistan was underway, and indicated that it as to be a two-part series of 60 minutes each, to be provisionally titled Ross Kemp: Return To Afghanistan. It was later confirmed that the second series like the first was to be a five-part programme, and was to premiere on Sunday 1 February 2009.

In the follow-up series, Kemp is embedded within Delta company of the Argyll and Sutherland Highlanders (5 Scots), the 5th battalion of the Royal Regiment of Scotland, deployed to Afghanistan as part of 16th Air Assault Brigade. In Afghanistan 5 Scots were based in the town of Musa Qala(also spelt Musa Qaleh). Kemp and his crew spent 3 weeks with 5 Scots, arriving in Musa Qala on Sunday 17 August 2008, having recently finished filming in Belize for Ross Kemp on Gangs. Despite being a Scottish Regiment, 5 Scots are based in Canterbury in the county of Kent, in the south east of England, and in a similar vein to the background of series 1 where Kemp had personal roots in East Anglia, Kemp had also previously lived in Maidstone, Kent, for five years from 1989.

5 Scots had been in Helmand Province since March 2008 on a seven-month tour. As well as 5 Scots, in the follow-up series Kemp also spent two weeks with Victor Company of 45 Commando Royal Marines, who had deployed to Afghanistan in October 2008. During the second series he was also thought likely to patrol with soldiers of the Princess of Wales's Royal Regiment (The Tigers), the Royal Irish Regiment and the Afghan National Army. In motivation for creating the second series, Kemp stated that with the follow-up he wanted "to see whether the sacrifice they made was actually worth it, if this is a situation that's winnable, how long this situation will go on and to get to meet 5 Scots".

Musa Qaleh was held by the Taliban during the time of the first series. The town was described by the MOD as "a much sought after target for both ISAF and Taliban forces and scene of the heaviest fighting in the country". It was recaptured in December 2007 by ISAF and the Afghan National Army in the Battle of Musa Qala. While it was held by the Taliban Musa Qala was described by the MOD as "a key staging post for arms and drugs transported to and from Pakistan and Iran", who stated that the Taliban want to regain control of it because of its tactical importance. Producer Matt Bennett said of 5 Scots, "They're very much at the sharp end of pushing back the Taliban and opening up that area around Musa Qala", while Kemp stated "Progress in Helmand rests and falls on what happens in Musa Qaleh. The Taliban surround it on all sides". Kemp was also keen to document how the soldiers worked with the local population of the town.

At the beginning of episode 1 of the second series, 5 Scots and Kemp are ambushed by the Taliban within 30 minutes of his first patrol, targeted by small arms fire and RPG rockets.

Speaking of the situation in Afghanistan since his visits in 2007, "it's a very different war since I was here a year ago but the fighting with the Taliban is as intense as ever. The war's changed in that the Taliban are using far more IEDs (improvised explosive devices) and anti-personnel mines... Kemp described how the Taliban had now apparently taken to engaging from a distance, and planting IEDs and mines in areas where troops are likely to take cover, switching from conventional tactics to a greater use of booby traps and suicide bombers.

5 Scots returned to their Howe Barracks base in Canterbury in October 2008. Meeting them on their return, Kemp said of the soldiers of the battalion that they were "a fantastic bunch of lads with a great sense of humour. They really are a tribute to the British army. There was no point when they did not take the fight to the enemy."

== See also ==
- British Forces casualties in Afghanistan (2001–2021)
- Coalition combat operations in Afghanistan in 2007
- Coalition combat operations in Afghanistan in 2008
- Helmand province campaign
- Operation Herrick order of battle
- Timeline of the War in Afghanistan (2001–2021)
