= Lesley McGuire =

Irish actress

Lesley McGuire (born 1970) is an Irish actress who played Jenny Delaney/Quinnan in The Bill and has also appeared in Kavanagh QC, Silent Witness, Doctors and Shameless.
