= Ross Kemp: Battle for the Amazon =

- Genre: Documentary
- Presented by: Ross Kemp
- Country of origin: United Kingdom
- Original language: English
- No. of series: 1
- No. of episodes: 2

Production
- Running time: 60 minutes (inc. adverts)
- Production companies: Tiger Aspect Productions and Mongoose Productions

Original release
- Network: Sky1
- Release: 20 April – 21 April 2010

Related
- Ross Kemp in Search of Pirates; Ross Kemp: Extreme World

Ross Kemp: Battle for the Amazon is a documentary series shown on Sky1. The show is hosted by actor Ross Kemp, best known for his role of Grant Mitchell in the show EastEnders.
