= Ross Kemp in Search of Pirates =

- Genre: Documentary
- Presented by: Ross Kemp
- Country of origin: United Kingdom
- Original language: English
- No. of series: 1
- No. of episodes: 3

Production
- Running time: 60 minutes (inc. adverts)
- Production companies: Tiger Aspect Productions and Mongoose Productions

Original release
- Network: Sky1
- Release: 8 June – 22 June 2009

Related
- Ross Kemp in Afghanistan; Ross Kemp: Battle for the Amazon

Ross Kemp in Search of Pirates is a documentary series presented by actor Ross Kemp on Sky 1. During filming Kemp was aboard the warship which was deployed to rescue Captain Phillips after his ship the Maersk Alabama was captured off the coast of Somalia by pirates.
