= 2012 in British television =

This is a list of events that took place in 2012 related to British television.

== Events ==
=== January ===
Date	Event
1	Pam St Clement makes her final appearance in EastEnders as Pat Butcher, the character having been killed off in a cancer storyline.
1	BBC One airs Adele Live at the Royal Albert Hall, a programme featuring highlights of a concert given by Adele on 21 September 2011 as part of the singer's Adele Live tour.
1	ITV screens the terrestrial television premiere of Harry Potter and the Half-Blood Prince, the sixth instalment in the Harry Potter film series. The film is watched by 3.5 million viewers, but beaten in the ratings by "A Scandal in Belgravia", the opening episode of BBC One's second series of Sherlock, and EastEnders.
2	1960s-set Inspector Morse prequel Endeavour makes its debut on ITV for the first time, initially as a pilot episode before becoming a full series from April 2013.
7	BBC One airs the first episode of Casualty filmed at its purpose-built studios in Roath Lock, Cardiff, the series having been previously filmed in Bristol. The episode, "Duty of Care", is also the first to be broadcast in HD.
9	Nick Hewer takes over as presenter of Countdown as the game show returns for a new series.
16	Jane McDonald returns to the panel of Loose Women after an 18-month break.
18	A call by BBC Two's Stargazing Live for amateur astronomers to locate possible exoplanets, planets orbiting stars outside the Solar System, leads to the discovery of a new Neptune-sized exoplanet by two viewers, one in Peterborough. The planet is named Threapleton Holmes B in their honour.
18	Producers of Coronation Street defend a storyline in which the character Faye Butler is slapped for misbehaving by her adoptive mother's boyfriend after the episode (aired on 16 January) attracts a number of complaints from viewers to ITV and Ofcom.
20	Press TV, an English language news channel owned by the Iranian Government, is forced off air in the United Kingdom after Ofcom revokes its broadcasting licence for breaching the terms of the Communications Act.
21	Under new guidelines to come into force from 30 April clinics which charge for pregnancy services including abortions will be able to advertise on radio and television after the Broadcast Committee of Advertising Practice ruled there was no justification for barring such clinics from advertising their services.
27	Actress and television presenter Denise Welch wins the ninth series of Celebrity Big Brother.

=== February ===
Date	Event
2	Letitia Dean is to return to EastEnders.
8 – 22	Analogue is switched off in the Hannington area
11	The live televised France versus Ireland match in the 2012 Six Nations Championship is abandoned minutes prior to kick-off, prompting boos to ring out among disgruntled spectators inside a packed Stade de France. It is the first time such an event has happened since 1985.
13	ITV screens the first ever British advert aimed specifically at dogs. The 60-second commercial for the Bakers dog food brand features high-pitched sounds that cannot be heard by humans, and is a send up of the 1969 film The Italian Job.
20	Media regulator Ofcom states that remarks made on Channel 5's The Wright Stuff on 6 December last year in relation to the murder of Liam Aitchison were "clearly capable of causing offence", but that the issue has been "resolved".
20	The ITN produced 5 News bulletins are relaunched, with newscasters Matt Barbet and Emma Crosby retaining their presenting roles.
21	The BBC defends its coverage of Whitney Houston's funeral on the BBC News Channel following a number of complaints from viewers about its duration. The four-hour service was aired on Saturday 18 February following the singer's death the previous weekend.
21	Singer Adele apologises for making a middle finger gesture after her Brit Awards acceptance speech is cut short due to broadcasting time constraints. ITV in turn issues an apology to the singer the following day.
24	At the conference of St Mary's Sexual Assault Referral Centre in Manchester Coronation Street producer Phil Collinson defends a recent storyline involving the rape of Carla Connor by her business partner, but admits mistakes were made in developing the plot.

=== February–March ===
Date	Event
29 February – 14 March	Analogue is switched off in the Midhurst area.

=== March ===
Date	Event
1	BBC News journalist Natalia Antelava is deported from Uzbekistan without official reason.
5	ITV and STV sign a deal which (if approved by Ofcom) could see more networked programmes appearing on television in Scotland. The agreement would end a three-year hiatus which has seen many major ITV programmes absent from schedules in Scotland.
5	The BBC broadcast their first Sports bulletins from the new BBC Sport Centre at MediaCityUK in Salford.
7 – 21	Analogue is switched off in the Rowridge and Whitehawk Hill areas.
9	BBC newsreader Simon McCoy is caught apparently sleeping at the newsdesk as the daily BBC News Channel programming begins at 8:30 am, although he later denied he was asleep.
12	BBC Two airs a programme in its This World strand concerning the Chinese television programme Interviews Before Execution in which death row inmates are interviewed by a reporter shortly before they are executed. Chinese authorities cancel the show following international interest generated by the documentary.
12	Bryan Kirkwood resigns as Executive Producer of the BBC's EastEnders.
14	Man vs. Wild presenter Bear Grylls has reportedly been sacked by the Discovery Channel because of "a continuing contractual dispute".
15	Shelina Permalloo wins the 2012 series of MasterChef.
18	Channel 4 confirms it has secured a four-year deal to broadcast horse racing from 2013, including coverage of the Grand National, the Derby and Royal Ascot which have previously been aired by the BBC.
19	BBC Director-General Mark Thompson tells staff at the broadcaster that he will step down from his position later in the year.
19	The University of Manchester wins the 2011–12 series of University Challenge, beating Pembroke College, Cambridge 180–135.
21	Former soap actress Jenna-Louise Coleman is named as the new Doctor Who sidekick, replacing current assistant Karen Gillan whose character Amy Pond will leave during the 2012 series.
23	The BBC's new television facility at dock10, MediaCityUK is officially opened by the Queen.
24	Harry Hill steps down as presenter of Harry Hill's TV Burp on ITV after 10 or 11 years.
25	Matthew Wolfenden and dance partner Nina Ulanova win the seventh series of Dancing on Ice.
25	With the approaching centenary of the sinking of the RMS Titanic ITV begins airing Julian Fellowes' four-part £11million retelling of the disaster.
26	The BBC's Panorama alleges that a company owned by News Corporation recruited a pay-TV "pirate" to hack a rival's secret codes then post the details online.
27	The BBC announces plans to axe 140 news posts in 2013 as part of cost-cutting measures.
31	Former broadcast journalist Mike Nesbitt is elected leader of the Ulster Unionist Party.
31	Anne Robinson presents the final edition of The Weakest Link on BBC One to concentrate on Watchdog.

=== April ===
Date	Event
3	James Murdoch resigns as Chairman of BSkyB in the wake of the News International phone hacking scandal.
3	Munich-based media regulator BLM announces it is removing Press TV from the SES Astra satellite as they do not have a licence to broadcast in Europe.
4 – 18	Analogue is switched off in London.
5	Sky News admits illegally hacking emails belonging to members of the public on two separate occasions.
6	The EastEnders Omnibus edition is moved to a late night Friday/early Saturday morning slot from Sunday afternoons.
7	The 158th University Boat Race between Oxford and Cambridge is stopped mid-race due to a swimmer in the water. Cambridge go on to win when a clash of oars at the restart leaves Oxford with a broken paddle.
10	BBC Breakfast makes its first broadcast from the BBC's new media complex at Salford Quays in Manchester, having moved there from London.
12	BSkyB signs a deal with MGM for exclusive rights to air the James Bond films in the United Kingdom, beginning from October to coincide with the 50th anniversary of the film franchise. The agreement means the end of ITV's unbroken run as sole holder of the screen rights which began in 1975.
14	The Grand National is shown on the BBC for the last time following a consecutive run of 52 years.
18	In a rare move, television cameras are allowed into the High Court in Edinburgh to film the sentencing of David Gilroy for the murder of Suzanne Pilley.
18	The ETP-1 test card makes one final appearance on Channel 4 to announce the loss of analogue television services in the London region. The card is shown from the Crystal Palace transmitter only, and is the last thing broadcast by analogue Channel 4 before the signal is switched off.
19	Sky News airs a televised debate between the main three candidates in the 2012 London mayoral election.
20	Tetley announce a deal to sponsor family movies on Channel 5.
23	Ofcom launches an investigation into the hacking of private email accounts by Sky News. The announcement comes on the same day that the news channel's boss John Ryley appears before the Leveson Inquiry where he says the company broke the law by hacking emails.
24	Northern Ireland's Social Democratic and Labour Party urges the British government to support calls for Irish broadcaster RTÉ to reverse its decision to close its London office, which is scheduled to shut following 2012 Summer Olympics.
25	The ITV HD channel is beset by a glitch when ITV accidentally cuts away from footage of extra time play during a Champions League match between Real Madrid and Bayern Munich to show news presenter Mark Austin doing up his jacket as he waits to present the delayed News at Ten. It is the broadcaster's third glitch during live football in recent months.
30	The BBC defends its decision to pre-record the Sunday evening results edition of The Voice after receiving 30 complaints because the show had been billed as a live broadcast. The BBC says the programme is too expensive to record live on Sundays and airing it on Saturday evening would mean it clashed with Britain's Got Talent.

=== May ===
Date	Event
2	Cardinal Seán Brady, the Catholic primate of all-Ireland says he will not resign his post as the BBC's This World programme reveals he had details of those being abused by paedophile priest Brendan Smyth, but did not pass the information on to police or parents of the victims.
10	The Channel 5 daytime show The Wright Stuff is being investigated by Ofcom over a survey on 26 April edition of the programme that asked viewers what the most offensive word is to describe someone with learning difficulties.
10	Prince Charles presents the lunchtime weather forecast during a visit to the BBC Scotland headquarters in Glasgow.
12	Ashleigh and Pudsey, a dancing dog trick act, win the sixth series of Britain's Got Talent.
14	The eighth instalment of the Up Series, 56 Up debuts on ITV.
14	Blockbusters returns to Challenge TV for the first time since the death of original host Bob Holness on 6 January. DJ Simon Mayo is chosen as the new host for the revival.
16	The BBC Trust confirms children's programmes will no longer air on BBC One and BBC Two following the completion of the digital switchover. Instead they will move to the dedicated CBBC and CBeebies channels.
19	Absent Friends, a fourth series episode of comedy Dad's Army, is repeated on BBC Two for the first time since its original broadcast in 1970. Before this, the episode was left out of repeat runs because of the controversial appearance of the IRA.
26	Sweden's Loreen wins the 2012 Eurovision Song Contest with "Euphoria".
29	The UK Government confirms that television viewers in Northern Ireland will be able to watch RTÉ One, RTÉ Two and TG4 on Freeview following the digital switchover.

=== May–June ===
Date	Event
30 May – 13 June	Analogue is switched off in the Hastings, Heathfield and Tunbridge Wells areas.

=== June ===
Date	Event
2 – 5	The BBC airs footage of the Diamond Jubilee Celebrations. Events include the Thames Diamond Jubilee Pageant on 3 June and the Diamond Jubilee Concert on 4 June.
2	Leanne Mitchell wins the first series of The Voice.
3	Ricky Martin, a former professional wrestler, wins the eighth series of The Apprentice along with a £250,000 investment from Lord Sugar, who will become his partner in a new business venture.
6	The BBC has received over 2,000 complaints from viewers about its Jubilee coverage. The broadcaster is also criticised by other media for its Thames Diamond Jubilee Pageant coverage, which is branded as "inane" and "tedious".
8	Start of Euro 2012, hosted by Poland and Ukraine.
12	Ranvir Singh and Matt Barbet are announced as the new presenters of the Daybreak news hour from 6 to 7 am.
13	BSkyB signs a £3bn three-year deal to screen Premier League football from 2013 to 2016. BT Vision also secures the rights to show 38 games per season over the same period.
13 – 27	Analogue is switched off in the Bluebell Hill and Dover areas thus completing the switchover for the Meridian area.
14	The Daily Record reports that BSkyB has threatened to cancel their contract to air games from the Scottish Premier League if Rangers are relegated from the division.
19	BBC Director General Mark Thompson tells the Culture, Media and Sport Select Committee that the corporation has "lessons to learn" from its coverage of the Queen's Diamond Jubilee after it received several thousand viewer complaints and heavy media criticism.
24	20.34 million watch the quarter-final match of Euro 2012 between England and Italy on BBC One, the highest number since the equivalent quarter final of Euro 2004. It briefly receives British television's highest audience for any programme for eight years until being overtaken the following month.

=== July ===
Date	Event
1	The BBC unveil their title sequence and marketing campaign for their coverage of the 2012 Summer Olympics.
1	Ukraine hosts the final match of Euro 2012, which sees Spain beat Italy 4–0.
3	Global Radio announce plans to branch into television with the launch of two non-stop music channels; Heart TV and Capital TV, which will go on air from September.
4	Broadcaster George Entwistle is named as the next Director-General of the BBC beginning in autumn 2012.
4	Launch of the IPTV television service YouView.
17	Rogue Traders presenter Dan Penteado is sacked from the programme after being jailed for 12 weeks for benefit fraud.
19	Former England footballer Lee Dixon is leaving the BBC's Match of the Day after eight years, it is reported. Sources such as Digital Spy report he will join ITV to provide football coverage in place of Gareth Southgate, who is leaving the channel to become the Football Association's technical director. ITV confirms the following day that Dixon will be part of its football presenter lineup, providing coverage of the Tuesday night Champions League, Europa League, FA Cup, and England's campaign to qualify for the 2014 World Cup.
19	Alibi HD is launched by UKTV.
23	The Olympic torch features in a special live section of EastEnders when actor Perry Fenwick, in character as Billy Mitchell carries it through the fictional Walford as part of the 2012 Olympic torch relay.
27	The events of the 2012 Summer Olympics begin airing with the opening ceremony in London. At its peak the event is watched by 26.9 million viewers, and with an average of 24.24 million it is the highest rating for anything on British television since 1997.

=== August ===
Date	Event
9	The BBC commissions a one-off drama to celebrate the 50th anniversary of Doctor Who. The film, An Adventure in Space and Time will tell the story of the team behind Doctor Who's creation and will air on BBC Two in 2013.
12	The 2012 Summer Olympics end with the closing ceremony receiving even more viewers than the opening ceremony, an average of 24.46 million. It becomes one of the most watched events in British television history.
12	The BBC's Gabby Logan is forced to apologise after mistakenly telling viewers of the previous evening's edition of BBC One's Olympics Tonight that the mother and sister of British boxing gold medallist Luke Campbell were dead. She had confused him with another boxer whose relatives were deceased.
13	Luke Anderson wins Big Brother 13.
14	Outgoing BBC Director-General Mark Thompson is appointed CEO of The New York Times, taking up his role in November.
19	It is reported that Work and Pensions Secretary Iain Duncan Smith's department has made a formal complaint to the BBC over claims of anti-Government bias, as Duncan Smith himself attacks the Corporation in a Mail on Sunday article for what he perceives to be its negative stance towards the coalition. Economics editor Stephanie Flanders is singled out for particular criticism, with the Minister accusing her of "peeing all over British industry".
28	UTV Media, which owns the ITV franchise for Northern Ireland and the UK-based sports-orientated radio station Talksport, reports a summer of mixed fortunes in terms of advertising revenue. Coverage of UEFA Euro 2012 proved lucrative for Talksport, but television advertising was hit by the 2012 Summer Olympics.
29	The opening ceremony of the 2012 Summer Paralympics is watched by a peak audience of 11.2 million viewers, with an overall average of 8 million.
29	The BBC has received 185 complaints about its new sitcom, Citizen Khan since the first episode aired two days earlier; with many claiming the series, about a Pakistani businessman stereotypes British Muslims.

=== September ===
Date	Event
1	Doctor Who returns for its seventh series with the surprise appearance of Jenna-Louise Coleman in the first episode, Asylum of the Daleks, four months before she is scheduled to make her debut.
3	ITV's breakfast stand Daybreak is relaunched with Aled Jones and Lorraine Kelly as its main presenters. Overnight figures the following day show it was watched by 600,000 viewers, viewer than the one million who tuned in to watch its debut in 2010.
4	Maria Miller is appointed Secretary of State for Culture, Media and Sport, replacing Jeremy Hunt.
4	A£30m Scottish Government campaign to raise cancer awareness will include the first ads in the UK to show real pictures of women's breasts that have been affected by cancer.
5	The updated version of the US soap opera Dallas makes its British television debut on Channel 5.
5	Coronation Street is moved from its Thursday slot to its original Wednesday slot.
7	Comedian Julian Clary wins the tenth series of Celebrity Big Brother.
9	The 2012 Summer Paralympics end with the closing ceremony.
10	Consumer documentary Food Unwrapped makes its debut on Channel 4.
12 – 26	Analogue is switched off in the Tyne Tees region thus completing the switchover for England and making it the 3rd Digital nation in the UK.
17	George Entwistle takes up his role of Director-General of the BBC.
20	The BBC shelves the final episode of its police drama Good Cop following the deaths of two police officers in Manchester.
20	Following an investigation in the wake of the News International phone hacking scandal, the media regulator Ofcom concludes that BSkyB is a "fit and proper" company to hold a broadcasting licence
21	Emma Kennedy wins the 2012 series of Celebrity MasterChef.
28	The BBC confirms that the final episode of Good Cop will air on 13 October.

=== October ===
Date	Event
1	Letitia Herod wins Cycle 8 of Britain & Ireland's Next Top Model.
2	BBC Breakfast presenter Susanna Reid apologises to viewers after a microphone which had been accidentally left on picked up business reporter Steph McGovern swearing shortly after she had finished presenting the programme's business news.
3	ITV airs a documentary, Exposure: The Other Side of Jimmy Savile in which several women allege to have been sexually abused by the late broadcaster Sir Jimmy Savile as teenagers. The following day the Metropolitan Police Service says it will assess the allegations.
4	BBC Four pulls two planned repeats of Top of the Pops from its schedule following recent allegations made against Jimmy Savile. The shows, which featured Savile as presenter, are part of the channel's weekly rerun of archive editions, which have been airing since last year.
5	Sky News presenter Kay Burley is criticised for insensitivity after she broke the news of the probable death of April Jones, a missing five-year-old girl live on air to volunteers who had been assisting in the search for her, and were unaware that the case had become a murder inquiry.
5	Samira Ahmed takes over from Raymond Snoddy as presenter of the BBC's Newswatch.
10 – 24	The last of the UK analogue signals are switched off in Northern Ireland, completing the digital switchover.
12	BBC Director-General George Entwistle asks BBC Scotland Director Ken MacQuarrie to speak to Newsnight journalists to establish why a planned documentary concerning Jimmy Savile child sexual abuse allegations was shelved before it was due to air in December 2011.
12	Channel 4 has announced that T4 would end after 14 years on air.
16	The BBC appoints the heads of two separate inquiries into sexual abuse allegations that have engulfed Jimmy Savile. Former High Court judge Dame Janet Smith will review the culture and practices of the BBC during the time Savile worked there, while Nick Pollard, a former Sky News executive will look at why a Newsnight investigation into Savile's activities was dropped shortly before transmission.
16	John Whaite wins the third series of The Great British Bake Off.
16	Emmerdale celebrates 40 years on air. A live episode is aired to mark the occasion on 17 October, which is watched by 9.2 million viewers. The episode culminates in the surprise death of the character Carl King (played by Tom Lister).
17	ITV's This Morning launches an investigation amid fears it was the victim of a hoax over a story about a celebrity sperm bank on the previous day's edition of the show. The following day ITV apologises to viewers who were misled by the item.
22	The BBC schedules a special edition of Panorama as it attempts to limit the damage done by allegations of sexual abuse by Jimmy Savile during his years with the broadcaster.
22	Peter Rippon, the Newsnight editor responsible for dropping an investigation into allegations against Jimmy Savile steps aside from his role with immediate effect.
22	Jeff Ford, one of the few executives to stay with Channel 5 following its 2010 acquisition by Richard Desmond, is to step down from the role on 1 December, it is confirmed.
23	After 32 years, Pages from Ceefax is shown for the last time during downtime on BBC Two. To mark the occasion the last broadcast is introduced by the symbol the channel was using 32 years earlier, older music is played and a final special image is shown thanking viewers for watching. The Plain English Campaign gives the service a lifetime achievement award for its "clarity" and use of "everyday words".
23	Northern Ireland becomes the final part of the United Kingdom to complete the switchover from analogue to digital television when the analogue signal is switched off at 11.30 pm.
26	Writing in The Guardian, Pointless co-presenter Richard Osman names what he believes to be four of UK TV's worst ever gameshows–24 Hour Quiz, Red or Black, Petrolheads and Shafted.
29	ITV releases a new version of its ITV Player service, enabling it to charge for some online content. The traditional 30-day catch-up service remains free, but viewers can watch the same programmes without adverts for a small payment.

=== November ===
Date	Event
2	The BBC confirms it will air no further episodes of Top of the Pops featuring Jimmy Savile.
6	Conservative MP Nadine Dorries is suspended from the party after her decision to appear on the reality television series I'm a Celebrity...Get Me Out of Here!.
9	ITV faces an investigation by the media regulator Ofcom after This Morning presenter Phillip Schofield handed Prime Minister David Cameron an internet-generated list of suspects in a child abuse case involving a care home during a live interview on the previous day's edition of the programme, and asked him to comment.
9	The BBC issues an apology after a key witness in a Newsnight report aired on 2 November wrongly identified a senior politician as a paedophile.
9	Have I Got News for You marks the tenth anniversary of its first guest presenter following the departure of Angus Deayton.
10	George Entwistle steps down as BBC Director-General following the Newsnight child abuse broadcast controversy. His reign of 54 days is the shortest in the corporation's history.
11	Tim Davie, BBC head of audio and music becomes Acting Director-General following George Entwistle's resignation.
12	Helen Boaden, the BBC's Director of News, and her deputy Steve Mitchell relinquish their roles in the wake of the Newsnight crisis. Fran Unsworth, head of newsgathering, and Ceri Thomas, the editor of Radio 4's Today are named acting director and deputy director of News respectively.
13	Ben Frow, the current Director of Content at Irish commercial broadcaster TV3, is hired by Channel 5 to replace Jeff Ford as Director of Programmes, and will take up the position in February 2013.
19	ITV airs the 8000th episode of Coronation Street.
22	The BBC appoints Tony Hall as its new Director-General. He is expected to start in the role in early March 2013.
23	Tom Barlow-Kay wins the 2012 series of Junior MasterChef.
30	At the age of 90, Baroness Trumpington becomes the oldest guest panelist to appear on Have I Got News for You.

=== December ===
Date	Event
1	The Welsh language HD channel S4C Clirlun closes, with Channel 4 HD taking over its transmission capacity the following day.
1	Actress Charlie Brooks wins the twelfth series of I'm a Celebrity...Get Me Out of Here!.
3	Sky News, Challenge TV and Pick TV are launched on Freesat.
3	The BBC announce plans for a screen adaptation of The Casual Vacancy, the first novel for adults by J. K. Rowling. A script for a three-part series is subsequently written by Sarah Phelps, with the BBC producing the project with HBO, and filming set to begin in Summer 2014.
3	The BBC signs a new four-year contract to air the National Lottery Draw, but will no longer screen the Wednesday and Friday night draws from January 2013. From then, programmes for the Saturday evening draw will be moved to a new purpose-built studio at Pinewood, while results updates will be given on Tuesdays, Wednesdays and Fridays.
4	The BBC announces a revamp of its Red Button service to make it compatible with internet-connected televisions.
5	As part of his Autumn Statement Chancellor George Osborne confirms a TV tax credit of 25% for high end UK TV productions, to be implemented from April 2013.
9	James Arthur wins the ninth series of The X Factor.
12	Actor and comedian Angus Deayton will join the cast of BBC school drama, Waterloo Road from 2013, it is confirmed.
13	Anton Piotrowski and Keri Moss are both named winners of the fifth series of MasterChef: The Professionals, the first time more than one finalist has won a MasterChef title.
16	Cyclist Bradley Wiggins is named this year's BBC Sports Personality of the Year.
18	At the High Court of England and Wales the BBC and ITV apologise to Lord McAlpine for "disastrously" and falsely linking him to allegations of child sex abuse.
19	The Pollard report into practices at the BBC is published, and finds there was a "complete inability" to deal with the Jimmy Savile crisis. Despite being criticised, the BBC Director of News Helen Boaden will return to her post in the wake of the report's publication, but her Deputy, Stephen Mitchell resigns. Peter Rippon is moved aside from his Newsnight post, with the programme having a new senior editorial team. Controller of BBC Radio 5 Live Adrian Van Klaveren also resigns.
20	Ashleigh Porter-Exley wins the third series of Young Apprentice.
21	After 27 years, CBBC airs on BBC One for the last time. All of the children's programmes would become exclusive to their dedicated channels, CBBC and CBeebies.
22	Olympic gymnast Louis Smith and professional dance partner Flavia Cacace win the tenth series of Strictly Come Dancing.
24	The Snowman and the Snowdog premieres on Channel 4.
25	The annual Royal Christmas Message is broadcast in 3D for the first time.
25	EastEnders is the most watched programme of the day with 9.4 million viewers, with Coronation Street second on 8.8 million. Other highlights are The Queen's Speech (8.3 million), Strictly Come Dancing (7.8 million) and The Royle Family (7.7 million).
25	Michael Angelis narrates his final episode of Thomas & Friends, The Christmas Tree Express on Channel 5.
26	Jenni Falconer presents the National Lottery Wednesday Night Draw, which airs on BBC One for the last time.
28	Matt Johnson presents the National Lottery Friday Night Draw, which airs on BBC One for the final time.
29	30 Years of CITV, a documentary made to commemorate the near thirtieth anniversary of Children's ITV, is released.
29	Youth-oriented TV channel T4 was broadcast for the final time after 14 years on air. Original presenters Vernon Kay, Miquita Oliver, Dermot O'Leary and Alexa Chung reunite for the final edition alongside existing presenters Jameela Jamil, Matt Edmondson, Nick Grimshaw, Georgie Okell and Will Best.

== Debuts ==
=== BBC ===
Date	Debut	Channel
4 January	Public Enemies	BBC One
10 January	The Mystery of Edwin Drood	BBC Two
13 January	4 O'Clock Club	CBBC
15 January	Sunday Politics	BBC One
15 January	Call the Midwife	BBC One
22 January	Birdsong	BBC One
23 January	The Estate	BBC One
30 January	Protecting Our Children	BBC One
31 January	Prisoners' Wives	BBC One
2 February	Inside Men	BBC One
6 February	Jedward's Big Adventure	CBBC
6 February	The Diamond Queen	BBC One
7 February	Death Unexplained	BBC One
8 February	Kevin Bridges: What's the Story?	BBC One
20 February	The Tube	BBC Two
20 February	Watson & Oliver	BBC Two
22 February	Winterwatch	BBC Two
23 February	Pramface	BBC Three
24 February	Melvyn Bragg on Class and Culture	BBC Two
25 February	Pop Life	BBC Two
27 February	Empire	BBC One
27 February	The Numtums	CBeebies
7 March	Venice 24/7	BBC Four
8 March	The Sarah Millican Television Programme	BBC Two
8 March	White Heat	BBC Two
12 March	Breakaway	BBC One
12 March	The Lingo Show	CBeebies
17 March	How God Made the English	BBC Two
19 March	The Sheriffs Are Coming	BBC One
24 March	The Voice UK	BBC One
26 March	One Night	BBC One
26 March	World Series of Dating	BBC Three
26 March	Secrets and Words	BBC One
27 March	The Syndicate	BBC One
2 April	Our Crime	BBC One
10 April	The Matt Lucas Awards	BBC One
16 April	The 70s	BBC Two
17 April	Meet the Romans with Mary Beard	BBC Two
24 April	Britain Unzipped	BBC Three
6 May	Planet Earth Live	BBC One
14 May	Chatsworth	BBC One
25 May	The Great British Story: A People's History	BBC Two
28 May	Afghanistan: The Great Game – A Personal View by Rory Stewart	BBC Two
31 May	Britain's Lost Routes with Griff Rhys Jones	BBC One
14 June	Dead Boss	BBC Three
17 June	True Love	BBC One
26 June	Line of Duty	BBC Two
9 July	Volcano Live	BBC Two
5 August	Exploring China: A Culinary Adventure	BBC Two
14 August	Bad Education	BBC Three
24 August	Parade's End	BBC One
26 August	Murder	BBC Two
27 August	Citizen Khan	BBC One
30 August	Good Cop	BBC One
25 September	The Paradise	BBC One
25 September	Cuckoo	BBC Three
26 September	Room at the Top	BBC Four
2 October	Ian Hislop's Stiff Upper Lip – An Emotional History of Britain	BBC Two
4 October	Hunted	BBC One
15 October	Claimed and Shamed	BBC One
18 October	Hebburn	BBC Two
24 October	Brazil with Michael Palin	BBC One
18 November	The Secret of Crickley Hall	BBC One
3 December	Inside Claridge's	BBC Two
26 December	The Girl	BBC Two
30 December	Ripper Street	BBC One

=== ITV ===
Date	Debut	Channel
1 January	My Phone Genie	CITV
2 January	Endeavour	ITV
6 January	Eternal Law	ITV
7 January	The Talent Show Story	ITV
10 January	The Exit List	ITV
15 March	Love Life	ITV
25 March	Titanic	ITV
7 April	Keith Lemon's Lemonaid	ITV
14 April	Saturday Cookbook	ITV
17 May	The Exclusives	ITV2
2 June	You Cannot Be Serious	ITV
10 June	Mark Wright's Hollywood Nights	ITV2
30 June	Mad Mad World	ITV
2 July	Tipping Point	ITV
5 July	Let's Get Gold	ITV
7 July	Superstar	ITV
2 August	Lemon La Vida Loca	ITV2
13 August	Ruth Rendell's Thirteen Steps Down	ITV
20 August	Don't Blow the Inheritance	ITV
1 September	Fool Britannia	ITV
3 September	Paul O'Grady: For the Love of Dogs	ITV
3 September	A Mother's Son	ITV
5 September	Mrs Biggs	ITV
9 September	The Scapegoat	ITV
25 September	The Martin Lewis Money Show	ITV
27 September	Homefront	ITV
15 October	Switch	ITV2
26 November	Britain's Best Bakery	ITV
26 December	That Dog Can Dance	ITV

=== Channel 4 ===
Date	Debut	Channel
2 January	The Bank Job	Channel 4
2 January	8 Out of 10 Cats Does Countdown	Channel 4
26 January	Noel Fielding's Luxury Comedy	E4
9 February	MotherTruckers	Channel 4
15 February	Daddy Daycare	Channel 4
17 February	The Mad Bad Ad Show	Channel 4
19 February	Homeland	Channel 4
1 March	Make Bradford British	Channel 4
1 March	Our Man in...	Channel 4
14 March	Sri Lanka's Killing Fields: War Crimes Unpunished	Channel 4
20 March	Hit the Road Jack	Channel 4
25 March	Sunday Brunch	Channel 4
3 April	The Undateables	Channel 4
24 April	Hidden Talent	Channel 4
27 April	Very Important People	Channel 4
3 May	The Hoarder Next Door	Channel 4
16 May	Secret Eaters	Channel 4
19 May	Extreme A&E	Channel 4
21 May	Love Shaft	E4
21 May	Gok Cooks Chinese	Channel 4
11 June	Secret Removers	Channel 4
26 June	Gordon Behind Bars	Channel 4
6 July	The Midnight Beast	E4
26 July	The Churchills	Channel 4
30 July	Spoof or Die	Channel 4
30 August	The Last Leg	Channel 4
4 September	World Without End	Channel 4
10 September	Food Unwrapped	Channel 4
15 September	Comedy World Cup	Channel 4
7 November	Secret State	Channel 4
12 November	1001 Things You Should Know	Channel 4
12 November	Full English	Channel 4
3 December	The Fear	

=== Channel 5 ===
Date	Debut	Channel
6 January	World's Toughest Trucker	Channel 5
9 January	When Paddy Met Sally	Channel 5
12 June	Killers Behind Bars: The Untold Story	Channel 5

=== Other channels ===
Date	Debut	Channel
1 January	Treasure Island	Sky 1
2 January	Obese: A Year to Save My Life	Sky 1
6 January	Stella	Sky 1
16 January	Gadget Geeks	Sky 1
29 January	Ashley Banjo's Secret Street Crew	Sky 1
27 February	Cleverdicks	Sky Atlantic
9 March	The F1 Show	Sky Sports F1
9 March	F1 Legends	Sky Sports F1
11 March	The Love Machine	Sky Living
18 March	Don't Stop Me Now	Sky 1
2 April	Morgan Spurlock's New Britannia	Sky Atlantic
16 April	Dara Ó Briain: School of Hard Sums	Dave
13 May	Starlings	Sky 1
22 May	Hit & Miss	Sky Atlantic
26 May	Kingdom of Plants 3D	Sky 3D
4 June	Doc McStuffins	Disney Jr.
25 June	Alan Partridge: Welcome to the Places of My Life	Sky Atlantic
6 July	Parents	Sky 1
8 July	Sinbad	Sky 1
26 August	A Touch of Cloth	Sky 1
6 September	The British	Sky Atlantic
10 September	Ronna and Beverley	Sky Atlantic
14 September	Moone Boy	Sky 1

== Channels ==
=== New channels ===
Date	Channel
13 February	MTV HD
9 March	Sky Sports F1
9 March	Sky Sports F1 HD
26 March	More4 +2
16 April	Trace Sports
23 April	MTV Live
3 May	Sony Movie Channel
3 May	Sony Movie Channel +1
30 May	BuzMuzik
3 July	Alibi HD
3 July	Heat
4 July	4seven
25 July	BBC Olympics 1–24
25 July	BBC Olympics 1–24 HD
25 July	British Eurosport HD
30 August	C4 Para 1–3
30 August	C4 Para 1–3 HD
3 September	British Eurosport 2 HD
4 September	TCM HD
20 September	Sky Atlantic +1
2 October	Nick Jr. +1
5 October	Sky Movies 007 HD
12 October	Heart TV
12 October	Capital TV

=== Defunct channels ===
Date	Channel
5 January	NME TV
14 February	Diva TV
21 February	Sky Living Loves
11 March	Current TV
16 April	Channel M
3 May	Movies4Men 2
3 May	Movies4Men 2 +1
26 June	More4 +2
3 July	Bio. HD
3 July	Q
13 August	BBC Olympics 1–24
13 August	BBC Olympics 1–24 HD
10 September	C4 Para 1–3
10 September	C4 Para 1–3 HD
2 October	Nicktoons Replay
1 December	Clirlun
31 December	Renault TV

=== Rebranded channels ===
Date	Old Name	New Name
1 March	Sky Sports HD 1	Sky Sports 1 HD
1 March	Sky Sports HD 2	Sky Sports 2 HD
1 March	Sky Sports HD 3	Sky Sports 3 HD
1 March	Sky Sports HD 4	Sky Sports 4 HD
23 April	MTVNHD	MTV Live HD
1 July	Sky Movies Showcase	Sky Movies Summer
1 July	Sky Movies Showcase HD	Sky Movies Summer HD
26 August	Sky Movies Summer	Sky Movies Showcase
26 August	Sky Movies Summer HD	Sky Movies Showcase HD
2 October	Nickelodeon Replay	Nickelodeon +1
5 October	Sky Movies Showcase	Sky Movies 007
5 October	Sky Movies Showcase HD	Sky Movies 007 HD
5 November	Sky Movies 007	Sky Movies Showcase
5 November	Sky Movies 007 HD	Sky Movies Showcase HD

== Television shows ==
=== Changes of network affiliation ===
Show	Moved from	Moved to
Fifth Gear	Channel 5	Discovery Channel
Match of the Day 2	BBC Two	BBC One
Mount Pleasant	Sky1	Sky Living
Fireman Sam	CITV	Channel 5
Pocoyo	CITV	Nick Jr.
Paralympic Games	BBC One / BBC Two / BBC Three	Channel 4

=== Returning this year after a break of one year or longer ===
Programme	Date(s) of original removal	Original channel(s)	Date of return	New channel(s)
Room 101	9 February 2007	BBC Two	20 January 2012	BBC One
Blockbusters	4 June 1993; 30 September 1994; 28 August 1997; 23 March 2001	ITV; Sky1; BBC Two; Sky1	14 May 2012	Challenge
All Star Mr & Mrs	2 July 1999; 4 April 2010	ITV	5 September 2012	N/A (Same channel as original)
Pocoyo	6 May 2007	La 2	10 September 2012	Nick Jr.
Red Dwarf	5 April 1999; 12 April 2009	BBC Two; Dave	4 October 2012	Dave
Surprise Surprise	26 December 2001	ITV	21 October 2012	N/A (Same channel as original)

== Continuing television shows ==
=== 1920s ===
Programme	Date
BBC Wimbledon	1927–1939, 1946–2019, 2021–present

=== 1930s ===
Programme	Date
Trooping the Colour	1937–1939, 1946–2019, 2023–present
The Boat Race	1938–1939, 1946–2019, 2021–present

=== 1950s ===
Programme	Date
Panorama	1953–present
The Sky at Night	1957–present
Blue Peter	1958–present

=== 1960s ===
Programme	Date
Coronation Street	1960–present
Points of View	1961–present
Songs of Praise	1961–present
University Challenge	1962–1987, 1994–present
Doctor Who	1963–1989, 1996, 2005–present
Top of the Pops	1964–present
Match of the Day	1964–present

=== 1970s ===
Programme	Date
Question of Sport	1970–present
Upstairs, Downstairs	1971–1975, 2010–2012
Emmerdale	1972–present
Mastermind	1972–present
Newsround	1972–present
Arena	1975–present
One Man and His Dog	1976–present
Top Gear	1977–present
Ski Sunday	1978–present
Antiques Roadshow	1979–present
Question Time	1979–present

=== 1980s ===
Programme	Date
Family Fortunes	1980–1985, 1987–2002, 2006–present
Children in Need	1980–present
Timewatch	1982–present
Channel 4 Racing	1984–2016
Thomas and Friends	1984–present
EastEnders	1985–present
Comic Relief	1985–present
Casualty	1986–present
This Morning	1988–present
Countryfile	1988–present
Red Dwarf	1988–1999, 2009, 2012–present
The Simpsons	1989–present

=== 1990s ===
Programme	Date
Have I Got News for You	1990–present
MasterChef	1990–2001, 2005–present
BBC World News	1991–present
Absolutely Fabulous	1992–1996, 2001–2004, 2011–2012
Junior MasterChef	1994–1999, 2010–2014
Room 101	1994–2007, 2012–2018
Time Team	1994–2013
The National Lottery Draws	1994–2017
Top of the Pops 2	1994–2017
Hollyoaks	1995–present
Never Mind the Buzzcocks	1996–2015
Silent Witness	1996–present
Midsomer Murders	1997–present
Teletubbies	1997–2012
Y Clwb Rygbi, Wales	1997–present
Bob the Builder	1998–present
Who Wants to Be a Millionaire?	1998–present
British Soap Awards	1999–2019, 2022–present
Holby City	1999–2022

=== 2000s ===
Programme	Date
2000
Big Brother	2000–2018
Bargain Hunt	2000–2018
BBC Breakfast	2000–2018
Click	2000–2018
Doctors	2000–2018
A Place in the Sun	2000–2018
Shipwrecked	2000–2002, 2006–2009, 2011–2012
The Unforgettable	2000–present
Unreported World	2000–present
2001
Celebrity Big Brother UK	2001–2018
BBC South East Today	2001–2018
Football Focus	2001–2018
Real Crime	2001–2018
Rogue Traders	2001–2018
Property Ladder	2001–2018
2002
Cash in the Attic	2002–2012
Escape to the Country	2002–present
Fifth Gear	2002–present
Flog It!	2002–present
Foyle's War	2002–2015
High Hopes	2002–present
I'm a Celebrity...Get Me Out of Here!	2002–present
In It to Win It	2002–2016
Inside Out	2002–present
Outtake TV	2002–present
River City	2002–2026
Saturday Kitchen	2002–present
Serious	2002–present
Sport Relief	2002–present
The Story Makers	2002–present
Tikkabilla	2002–present
2003
Daily Politics	2003–present
QI	2003–present
Peep Show	2003–2015
This Week	2003–2015
Celebrity Mastermind	2003–2015
Eggheads	2003–2015
Extraordinary People	2003–2015
Grumpy Old Men	2003–2015
Homes Under the Hammer	2003–2015
New Tricks	2003–2015
Traffic Cops	2003–present
2004
Match of the Day 2	2004–present
Shameless	2004–2013
Supernanny	2004–2008, 2010–present
Strictly Come Dancing	2004–present
The X Factor	2004–2018
10 Years Younger	2004–present
60 Minute Makeover	2004–present
Agatha Christie's Marple	2004–2013
The Big Fat Quiz of the Year	2004–present
Car Booty	2004–present
The Culture Show	2004–present
Doc Martin	2004–2022
Football First	2004–present
Funky Valley	2004–present
The Gadget Show	2004–present
Haunted Homes	2004–present
Jimmy's Farm	2004–present
Live at the Apollo	2004–present
NewsWatch	2004–present
Peppa Pig	2004–present
SadlerVision	2004–present
Strictly Come Dancing: It Takes Two	2004–present
Who Do You Think You Are?	2004–present
2005
Coach Trip	2005–2006, 2009–2012, 2014–present
8 out of 10 Cats	2005–present
Deal or No Deal	2005–2016
The Andrew Marr Show	2005–present
The Adventure Show	2005–present
The Apprentice	2005–present
The Biggest Loser	2005–present
Britain and Ireland's Next Top Model	2005–2013
Dragons' Den	2005–present
The F Word	2005–present
Fifi and the Flowertots	2005–present
The Hotel Inspector	2005–present
The Jeremy Kyle Show	2005–present
Ladette to Lady	2005–present
Missing Live	2005–present
Mock the Week	2005–present
Pocoyo	2005–present
Springwatch	2005–present
The Thick of It	2005–2012
Ukwia	2005–present
2006
Dancing on Ice	2006–2014
Waterloo Road	2006–2015
The Album Chart Show	2006–present
Animal Spies!	2006–present
The Apprentice: You're Fired!	2006–present
Banged Up Abroad	2006–present
Charlie Brooker's Screenwipe	2006–present
Codex	2006–present
Cricket AM	2006–present
Dickinson's Real Deal	2006–present
Don't Get Done, Get Dom	2006–present
Freshly Squeezed	2006–2012
Ghosthunting With...	2006–present
How to Look Good Naked	2006–present
The IT Crowd	2006–2012
Lewis	2006–2015
Little Princess	2006–present
Mama Mirabelle's Home Movies	2006–present
Monkey Life	2006–present
Most Annoying People	2006–present
The One Show	2006–present
People & Power	2006–present
Peschardt's People	2006–present
The Real Hustle	2006–present
Secret Millionaire	2006–present
The Slammer	2006–2015
Soccer Aid	2006–present
Something for the Weekend	2006–2012
Waterloo Road	2006–2015, 2023–present
Wild at Heart	2006–2012
2007
Britain's Got Talent	2007–present
Outnumbered	2007–2014
Skins	2007–2013
Trapped	2007–present
Would I Lie to You?	2007–present
The Alan Titchmarsh Show	2007–2014
Benidorm	2007–present
The Big Questions	2007–present
Britain's Best Dish	2007–present
Diddy Dick and Dom	2007–present
Don't Tell the Bride	2007–present
Embarrassing Bodies	2007–present
Escape from Scorpion Island	2007–present
Game60	2007–present
The Graham Norton Show	2007–present
Harry & Paul	2007–present
Heir Hunters	2007–present
Helicopter Heroes	2007–present
Inside Sport	2007–present
Inspector George Gently	2007–present
An Island Parish	2007–present
Jeff Randall Live	2007–present
London Ink	2007–present
Mary Queen of Shops	2007–present
Mister Maker	2007–present
Postcode Challenge	2007–present
Rapal	2007–present
The Real MacKay	2007–present
Real Rescues	2007–present
2008
An Là	2008–present
Are You an Egghead?	2008–present
Argumental	2008–present
Basil's Swap Shop	2008–present
Being Human	2008–2013
Big & Small	2008–present
Bizarre ER	2008–present
CCTV Cities	2008–present
Celebrity Juice	2008–present
Chinese Food Made Easy	2008–present
Chop Socky Chooks	2008–present
Chuggington	2008–present
Country House Rescue	2008–present
Dani's House	2008–present
The Family	2008–present
Famous 5: On the Case	2008–present
Gimme a Break	2008–present
The Hot Desk	2008–present
House Guest	2008–present
It Pays to Watch!	2008–present
The Live Desk	2008–present
Marvo the Wonder Chicken	2008–present
Merlin	2008–2012
Nightwatch with Steve Scott	2008–present
Only Connect	2008–present
Police Interceptors	2008–present
Richard Hammond's Engineering Connections	2008–present
Rubbernecker	2008–present
Rude Tube	2008–present
Seachd Là	2008–present
Sesame Tree	2008–2013
Snog Marry Avoid?	2008–2013
Supersize vs Superskinny	2008–2014
The Supersizers...	2008–present
UK Border Force	2008–present
Unbreakable	2008–present
Wallander	2008–2016
2009
The Impressions Show with Culshaw and Stephenson	2009–present
Miranda	2009–2015
PhoneShop	2009–2013
Pointless	2009–present
Russell Howard's Good News	2009–2015
Angelina Ballerina: The Next Steps	2009–present
The Chase	2009–present
The Cube	2009–2015
Alan Carr: Chatty Man	2009–2016
Angelina Ballerina: The Next Steps	2009–present
Bang Goes the Theory	2009–2014
Bookaboo	2009–present
Cast Offs	2009–present
Chris Moyles' Quiz Night	2009–present
Copycats	2009–present
Countrywise	2009–present
Cowboy Trap	2009–present
Crash	2009–present
Dating in the Dark	2009–present
Don't Get Screwed	2009–present
Ed and Oucho's Excellent Inventions	2009–present
Fern Britton Meets...	2009–present
Film Xtra	2009–present
The Football League Show	2009–2015
Four Weddings	2009–present
Grow Your Own Drugs	2009–present
Heston's Feasts	2009–present
Horrible Histories	2009–present
The Hour	2009–present
How the Other Half Live	2009–present
I Can Cook	2009–present
The Impressions Show with Culshaw and Stephenson	2009–present
Inside Nature's Giants	2009–present
Katie	2009–present
Land Girls	2009–present
Piers Morgan's Life Stories	2009–present
Peter Andre: The Next Chapter	2009–2013
Rip Off Britain	2009–present

=== 2010s ===
Programme	Date
2010
Accused	2010–2012
Celebrity Coach Trip	2010–2012, 2019–present
Come Fly with Me	2010–present
Dave's One Night Stand	2010–2012
Daybreak	2010–2014
DCI Banks	2010–2016
Dirty Sexy Funny	2010–present
Downton Abbey	2010–2015
Eddie Stobart: Trucks & Trailers	2010–2014
Facejacker	2010–2012)
Frank Skinner's Opinionated	2010–present
Grandma's House	2010–2012
The Great British Bake Off	2010–present
Great British Railway Journeys	2010–present
Him & Her	2010–2013
An Idiot Abroad	2010–2012
ITV Breakfast	2010–present
James May's Man Lab	2010–2013
Junior Apprentice	2010–present
Junior Doctors: Your Life in Their Hands	2011–2013
Lip Service	2010–2012
Late Kick Off	2010–present
A League of Their Own	2010–present
Lee Nelson's Well Good Show	2010–present
Little Crackers	2010–present
Lorraine	2010–present
Luther	2010–present
The Million Pound Drop	2010–2015
The Nightshift	2010–present
The Only Way Is Essex	2010–present
Pen Talar	2010–present
Pocket tv	2010–present
Rev.	2010–2014
The Rob Brydon Show	2010–2012
Roger & Val Have Just Got In	2010–2012
Scream! If You Know the Answer	2010–present
Sherlock	2010–present
So You Think You Can Dance	2010–present
Stand Up for the Week	2010–2013
Stargazing Live	2010–present
Strike-back	2010–present
STV Sports Centre	2010–present
Sunday Morning Live	2010–present
Take Me Out	2010–2020
Tracy Beaker Returns	2010–2012
The Trip	2010–present
Turn Back Time – The High Street	2010–present
The Zone	2010–present
2011
All Over the Place	2011–present
Bedlam	2011–2012
Episodes	2011–2017
Four Rooms	2011–2017
Fresh Meat	2011–2016
Friday Night Dinner	2011–present
Hacker Time	2011–2016
Home for the Holidays	2011–present
Horrible Histories: Gory Games	2011–2018
Junior Bake Off	2011–present
Junior Doctors: Your Life in Their Hands	2011–present
King Of...	2011–present
Made in Chelsea	2011–present
Match of the Day Kickabout	2011–present
Mad Dogs	2011–2013
Monroe	2011–2012
Perfection	2011–2015
Red or Black?	2011–2012
Ross Kemp: Extreme World	2011–2017
Sadie J	2011–2013
Scott & Bailey	2011–2016
The Sparticle Mystery	2011–2015
Sun, Sex and Suspicious Parents	2011–present
Text Santa	2011–2015
Top Boy	2011–2013, 2019–present
The Jonathan Ross Show	2011–present
Vera	2011–2025
White Van Man	2011–2012

== Ending this year ==
Date(s)	Programme	Channel(s)	Debut(s)
2 January	Treasure Island	Sky 1	2012
6 January	Public Enemies	BBC One	2012
16 January	When Paddy Met Sally	Channel 5	2012
27 January	Celebrity Coach Trip	Channel 4	2010
29 January	Shipwrecked	E4	2000, 2006 & 2011
9 February	Eternal Law	ITV	2012
17 February	Hustle	BBC One	2004
28 February	The Exit List	ITV	2012
9 March	Coach Trip	Channel 4 & More4	2005 & 2009
18 March	Something for the Weekend	BBC Two	2006
19 March	Dirk Gently	BBC Four	2010
23 March	Tracy Beaker Returns	CBBC	2010
24 March & 7 April	Harry Hill's TV Burp & Harry Hill's Best of TV Burp	ITV	2002
25 March	Upstairs Downstairs	ITV & BBC One	1971 & 2010
29 March	White Van Man	BBC Three	2011
31 March	The Weakest Link	BBC One & BBC Two	2000
31 March	Dani's House	CBBC	2008
6 April	Cleverdicks	Sky Atlantic	2012
12 April	White Heat	BBC Two	2012
15 April	Titanic	ITV	2012
1 May	Facejacker	Channel 4	2010
1 June	Very Important People	Channel 4	2012
13 July	The Ricky Gervais Show	E4	2010
3 August	Parents	Sky 1	2012
4 August	It's Me or the Dog	Channel 4, More4 & Pick TV	2005
5 August	Supernanny	Channel 4 & E4	2004 & 2010
20 August	Ruth Rendell's Thirteen Steps Down	ITV	2012
5 September	A Mother's Son	ITV	2012
18 September	The Rob Brydon Show	BBC Two	2010
21 September	In with the Flynns	BBC One	2011
23 September	Sinbad	Sky 1	2012
3 October	Mrs Biggs	ITV	2012
15 October	Ian Hislop's Stiff Upper Lip – An Emotional History of Britain	BBC Two	2012
27 October	The Thick of It	BBC Four & BBC Two	2005
1 November	Homefront	ITV	2012
19 November	Switch	ITV2	2012
22 November	Hunted	BBC One	2012
23 November	Me and Mrs Jones	BBC One	2012
28 November	Secret State	Channel 4	2012
2 December	The Secret of Crickley Hall	BBC One	2012
13 December	The Hour	BBC Two	2011
21 December	An Idiot Abroad	Sky 1	2010
21 December	Freshly Squeezed	Channel 4	2006
24 December	Merlin	BBC One	2008
25 December	The Royle Family	BBC Two & BBC One	1998 & 2006
30 December	T4	Channel 4 & E4	1998
30 December	Wild at Heart	ITV	2006
31 December	Total Wipeout	BBC One	2009

== Deaths ==
Date	Name	Age	Broadcast credibility
January	Bryan Daly	91	Theme tune composer (Postman Pat, Gran, Bertha the Machine)
3 January	Jenny Tomasin	73	Actress (Upstairs, Downstairs, Emmerdale)
4 January	Kerry McGregor	37	Singer-songwriter and actress
6 January	Bob Holness	83	Game show host (Take a Letter, Blockbusters, Raise the Roof, Call My Bluff)
10 January	Lila Kaye	82	Actress
22 January	Sarah Cullen	62	Television and radio journalist (ITN News)
26 January	Ian Abercrombie	77	Actor (Seinfeld, Army of Darkness, Star Wars: The Clone Wars, Wizards of Waverly Place)
26 January	Colin Tarrant	59	Actor (The Bill) aka Andrew Monroe
12 February	David Kelly	82	Actor (Me Mammy, The Italian Job, Charlie and the Chocolate Factory, Fawlty Towers)
15 February	James Whitaker	71	Journalist, specialising in the British royal family
22 February	Frank Carson	85	Comedian
1 March	Gemma McCluskie	29	Actress (EastEnders)
5 March	Philip Madoc	77	Actor (Dad's Army, Doctor Who, The Life and Times of David Lloyd George)
3 May	Charlotte Mitchell	85	Actress (The Adventures of Black Beauty, ...And Mother Makes Five)
17 May	Colin McIntyre	85	Founding editor of the BBC's Ceefax teletext service
5 June	Caroline John	71	Actress (Doctor Who)
17 June	Brian Hibbard	65	Actor, singer (Coronation Street, Emmerdale)
4 July	Eric Sykes	89	Comedian (Sykes)
20 July	Sir Alastair Burnet	84	Journalist and broadcaster (News at Ten)
20 July	Simon Ward	70	Actor and Stage.
21 July	Angharad Rees	68	Actress (Poldark).
26 July	Mary Tamm	62	Actress (Doctor Who).
27 July	Geoffrey Hughes	68	Actor (Coronation Street, Keeping Up Appearances, The Royle Family, Heartbeat) aka Eddie Yeats
11 August	Sid Waddell	72	Sports commentator and television personality
31 August	Max Bygraves	89	Comedian, singer, actor and variety performer (Crackerjack, Family Fortunes)
6 September	Terry Nutkins	66	British TV presenter and naturalist
22 September	Mike Baker	55	BBC journalist
27 September	Herbert Lom	95	Actor (The Pink Panther, Spartacus, Gambit, The Ladykillers)
22 October	Mike Morris	66	British TV presenter and journalist
6 November	Clive Dunn	92	Actor and entertainer (Dad's Army)
9 November	Bill Tarmey	71	Actor (Coronation Street) aka Jack Duckworth
9 December	Patrick Moore	89	Astronomer and broadcaster (The Sky at Night)
14 December	Kenneth Kendall	88	BBC's first in-vision newsreader
21 December	Daphne Oxenford	93	Radio presenter and actress (Listen with Mother, Coronation Street)
26 December	Gerry Anderson	83	Producer, writer and director (Supercar, Fireball XL5, Thunderbirds, Stingray, Captain Scarlet and the Mysterons, Joe 90, Space: 1999)
29 December	Tony Greig	66	Former England Cricket Captain and sports commentator

== See also ==
- 2012 in British music
- 2012 in British radio
- 2012 in the United Kingdom
- List of British films of 2012
