= Dominic Sandbrook =

British historian and television presenter

Dominic Sandbrook FRHistS
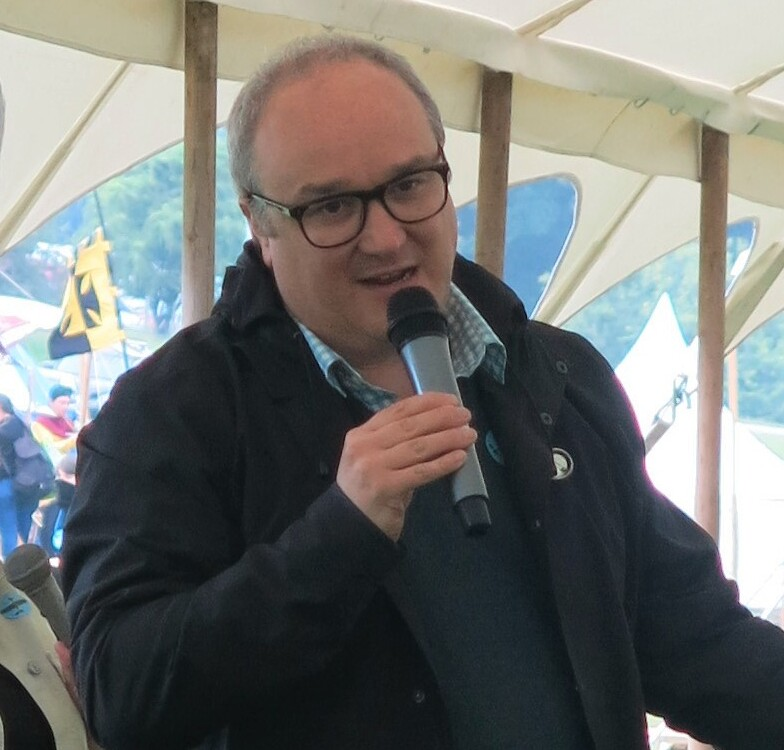
- Sandbrook in 2021
- Born: Dominic Christopher Sandbrook; 2 October 1974 (age 52); Bridgnorth, Shropshire, England
- Education: Balliol College, Oxford (BA) University of St Andrews (MLitt) Jesus College, Cambridge (PhD)
- Occupations: Author; historian; podcaster; radio and television presenter
- Spouse: Catherine Morley (m. 2007)
- Children: 1
- Website: dominicsandbrook.com

Dominic Christopher Sandbrook (born 2 October 1974) is a British popular historian. He has written numerous popular history books and newspaper articles, presented historical programmes on BBC Television and Radio, and, since 2020, has co-hosted the The Rest Is History podcast with historian and author Tom Holland. He also co-hosts The Book Club alongside Tabitha Syrett.

== Early life and education ==
He was born in October 1974 in Bridgnorth, Shropshire. He was educated at Malvern College, then an all-boys independent school in Worcestershire.

He studied history and French at Balliol College, Oxford. He subsequently obtained a Master of Letters (MLitt) degree in history from the University of St Andrews and a Doctor of Philosophy (PhD) degree from Jesus College, Cambridge. His doctoral thesis, entitled "The political career of Senator Eugene McCarthy", was completed in 2002.

== Academia ==
Previously a lecturer in history at the University of Sheffield, Sandbrook has been a senior fellow of the Rothermere American Institute at the University of Oxford and a member of its history faculty. He was a visiting professor at King's College London, and a freelance writer and newspaper columnist.

In 2007 he was named one of Waterstones' 25 Authors for the Future. In July 2021 he was elected a Fellow of the Royal Historical Society (FRHistS).

During his academic career he lectured left-wing activist Owen Jones.

== Writing career and reception ==
=== Eugene McCarthy (2004) ===
Sandbrook's first book was a biography of the United States presidential candidate Eugene McCarthy.

The historian David Stebenne gave it a mixed review, writing that "Although Sandbrook's book describes McCarthy's life and work with outstanding grace and clarity, using him as a vehicle to explain the odyssey of American liberalism since World War II poses some problems". The historian Doug Rossinow was more positive, writing that "This is a very fine account in many ways, very skillfully written and exhaustively researched. Eugene McCarthy is an excellent and provocative work, one I heartily recommend". Both David Stebenne and Jennifer Delton particularly praised the initial sections of the book on McCarthy's early career and formative influences. Delton wrote that “While the author does a great job of tying the early McCarthy to his historical moment, he is less successful in doing the same with the later McCarthy".

McCarthy himself told journalists that he "liked the early part of the book, which described his early life as a college professor and his early battles in Minnesota Democratic-Farmer-Labor politics" but disliked the later sections. McCarthy said that "What Sandbrook writes about the early years is pretty good, but every page after the first 50 is trash", calling the book "almost libellous".

=== Never Had It So Good (2005) ===
In 2005 Sandbrook published Never Had It So Good, a history of Britain from the Suez Crisis to the Beatles, 1956–63. It received mixed reviews.

The historian Jim Tomlinson wrote that Sandbrook was "inclined to a rather unreflective declinism" in the work and criticised the lack of a serious analysis of Macmillan's 'Never Had it So Good' speech which gave the book its title, but nonetheless commended the "breadth of coverage of social and cultural issues". In his review Anthony Howard criticised some of the characterisations of politicians but overall described Never Had it so Good as a "rich treasure chest of a book", writing of his "respect for the sweep and scope of the author's knowledge". The historian Arthur Marwick criticised the book, writing that it worked as an introduction to the period and a "compendium of references", but failed to produce any novel, original research. Marwick wrote that "The book has little structure, no sense of movement through time, and certainly fails to make the author's much-advertised case".

=== White Heat (2006) ===
The sequel, White Heat, covering the years 1964–70 and the rise and fall of Harold Wilson's Labour government, was published in August 2006.

The historian Peter Clarke praised the book's comprehensiveness. Even while in Clarke's view Sandbrook sometimes flitted between topics, Clarke wrote that "this is history of a commendably inclusive range...There is something for everybody." He particularly praised the sections of the book on George Brown. Vernon Bogdanor wrote that the book was a good introduction to the period, but was more critical: "It seeks to be comprehensive, covering not just politics, but the arts, social trends, fashion and popular culture. But it does not dig very deep." Leo McKinstry in The Times wrote that "Sandbrook's book could hardly be more impressive in its scope", "He writes with authority and an eye for telling detail." James Buchan observed, "For all the charm of Dominic Sandbrook's book, with its minute anatomy of social forms and brilliant parade of charlatans and fools, it is hard not to feel that somehow time has not been well used."

Unlike some historians of the 1960s, Sandbrook argues it was marked by conservatism and conformity. His books attempt to debunk what he sees as myths associated with the period, from the sexual revolution to student protest, and he challenges the "cultural revolution" thesis associated with historians like Arthur Marwick. Charles Shaar Murray in The Independent, noting that Sandbrook had criticised older historians who "found it hard to separate their own private memories from their interpretation of the subject", called him "the Hoodie Historian" and imagined him "slouching into shot while throwing whatever passes for gang signs in the history department of the University of Sheffield, and announcing to Arthur Marwick, Jonathon Green et al. that 'You is all mi bitches nuh.'"

In November 2009 it was named by The Daily Telegraph as "one of the books that defined the Noughties".

=== State of Emergency (2010) ===
Sandbrook continued the history of postwar Britain with State of Emergency (2010), covering the period 1970–74, and Seasons in the Sun, which took the story up to the election of Margaret Thatcher as prime minister in 1979.

Many reviewers praised the portrait painted of Ted Heath in the book and the narrative of the political events and crises of the period. D.J. Taylor wrote approvingly of the book's analysis of the "renewed love-affair with an idealised national past" that marked a "cultural tendency of the early 1970s".

David Edgar, who had previously written a sustained critique of Sandbrook's analysis of literature in his early books, had a more positive review, writing that "State of Emergency is kinder to the artistic life of the 1970s, praising its literature, noting the excellence of its television drama...[that it was] a golden period for the theatre...on the wider cultural front, there is evidence that he has mellowed".

The literary critic Sean O'Brien criticised State of Emergency for over-simplification, writing that "Matters were more complex and varied socially than Sandbrook has space or perhaps inclination to suggest. Those of an age to test memory against his account will naturally dispute some of his emphases". O'Brien pointed out Sandbrook's failure to analyse 1970s subcultures, the impact of Motown and black British music, and the impact of Marxist ideas in sufficient depth.

The historian James Cronin, while largely praising the political narrative, similarly criticised Sandbrook's analyses of sub-cultures and social movements, writing that the book was overly-dismissive of the novelty and creativity of the sub-cultures of the era: it "does not help that Sandbrook is so ready to judge, so moralistic in his assessments. He clearly lacks sympathy for the groups and people whose claims were so central to the moment"

=== Mad as Hell (2011) ===
In 2011, before he had finished his book series about Britain, Sandbrook published Mad as Hell about American populism in the 1970s, discussing cultural influences such as disco, the Ford and Carter presidencies, Bruce Springsteen and the Dallas Cowboys. In The Wall Street Journal, Michael C. Moynihan identified several sentence fragments that had been closely paraphrased from sources, which he considered plagiarism. Moynihan later said he was surprised Sandbrook had not suffered serious career repercussions. Sandbrook rejected the allegations and maintained that he "footnoted his sources, and if popular history books sometimes sound familiar that is because there are only so many ways to say things".

=== Seasons in the Sun (2012) ===
The historian Peter Clarke gave Seasons in the Sun a mixed review. Clarke criticised Sandbrook's poor handling of statistics, but complimented the book on its combination of popular culture and politics, writing that Seasons in the Sun showed the author "notably comfortable with the idioms of the popular culture of the 1970s, which receive full scrutiny in many of the chapters. These are skilfully juxtaposed with other sections chronicling high politics with a similarly shrewd appreciation of the telling detail or the revealing anecdote." Clarke particularly praised how the political narrative was "shown in graphic detail by Sandbrook, mining with telling effect the copious diaries left by Labour insiders... in particular, Bernard Donoughue".

=== The Great British Dream Factory (2015) ===
The Great British Dream Factory, The Strange History of our National Imagination covered a broad cultural history of Britain from the late 19th century through to the early 21st century.

=== Who Dares Wins (2019) ===
A fifth volume, Who Dares Wins, covering the period 1979–1982, was published in October 2019. Ewan Gibbs, a historian of de-industrialisation, while positive about certain aspects of the book, also had criticisms, writing that in his view Sandbrook wrongly "presents Thatcherism as the only feasible route" out of the UK's decline: "Sandbrook is firmly committed to a central Thatcherite myth: there is no alternative". Gibbs also challenged the book's over-reliance on newspapers of the time, writing that "replicating the hysteria of contemporary reporting, Sandbrook betrays the limitations of his sources".

Other reviews were more positive. The political philosopher John Gray referred to the book as "a magnificent history" and "indispensable to anyone who wants to understand these pivotal years". For The Sunday Times the historian Piers Brendon said it was "a rich mixture of political narrative and social reportage ... scholarly, accessible, well written, witty and incisive."

=== Children's non-fiction ===
Sandbrook has written a series of children's non-fiction books on historical topics.

- Adventures in Time: The Second World War (2021)
- Adventures in Time: The Six Wives of Henry VIII (2021)
- Adventures in Time: Alexander the Great (2021)
- Adventures in Time: The First World War (2021)
- Adventures in Time: Cleopatra, Queen of the Nile (2022)
- Adventures in Time: Fury of The Vikings (2022)
- Adventures in Time: The Fall of the Aztecs (2023)
- Adventures in Time: Nelson, Hero of the Seas (2024)

=== Further writings ===
Sandbrook has written articles and reviews for the Daily Mail, The Sunday Times, The Sunday Telegraph, The Observer and The Daily Telegraph, and has appeared on BBC radio and television. His Radio Four series SlapDash Britain, charting the rise and fall of British governance since the Second World War, was described by the radio critic Miranda Sawyer as "very brilliant".

== Television and radio ==
Year	Title	Broadcaster	Notes
2009	Caravans: A British Love Affair	BBC 4	Documentary about the love affair between the British and their caravans, which transformed the holiday habits of generations of families from the 1950s through to the present day.
2009	Archive on 4: "The Anniversary Anniversary"	Radio 4	An examination of people's obsessions with anniversaries
2009	Archive on 4: "Pinter On Air"	Radio 4	Discussing the role of television and radio dramas in establishing Harold Pinter's reputation
2010	SlapDash Britain	Radio 4	A 2-part series examining bureaucracy and incompetence in British government since the 1950s
2010	Archive on 4: "A Working-class Tory Is Something To Be"	Radio 4	With David Davis. An exploration of the history of British working-class Conservatives
2011	Archive on 4: "Mind Your PMQs"	Radio 4	The history and role of Prime Minister's Questions
2011	The People's Post: A Narrative History of the Post Office	Radio 4	A 15-part series examining the history of the Royal Mail
2012	Archive on 4: "Tuning in"	Radio 4	The history of British radio entertainment
2012	The 70s	BBC Two	A 4-part history of Britain during the 1970s
2013	Das Auto: The Germans, Their Cars and Us	BBC Two	The ascendence of the post-war automotive industry in Germany
2013	Strange Days: Cold War Britain	BBC Two	A history of Britain during the Cold War
2014	Learning to Listen	Radio 4	The development of radio listening habits through the 1920s and 1930s
2014	Tomorrow's Worlds: The Unearthly History of Science Fiction	BBC Two	A 4-part history of science fiction
2014	Archive on 4: "The Eccentric Entrepreneur"	Radio 4	The life of Captain Leonard Plugge
2015	Let Us Entertain You	BBC Two	A 4-part history of British post-war culture
2015	Archive on 4: "The Future of the BBC: A History"	Radio 4	A history of the BBC and how it may need to change to survive
2016	The 80s with Dominic Sandbrook	BBC Two	A 3-part history of Britain during the 1980s
2016	Future Tense – The Story of H.G. Wells	BBC One	Examines how H. G. Wells's lower-middle class upbringing in the suburban counties of South East England influenced his early science fiction writing.

== Podcasts ==
Since 2020, Sandbrook has co-presented a podcast with the historian Tom Holland called The Rest is History.

In 2026, Sandbrook began co-presenting The Book Club, alongside The Rest is History producer Tabitha Syrett.

Both podcasts are produced by Goalhanger.

== Personal life ==
As of 2024, Sandbrook lives in Chipping Norton, Oxfordshire, with his wife, Catherine, and their son.

He is a supporter of Wolverhampton Wanderers F.C.

== Bibliography ==
- Eugene McCarthy: The Rise and Fall of Postwar American Liberalism. New York: Alfred A. Knopf. 2004. ISBN 978-1-400-04105-3. OCLC 53831429.
- Never Had It So Good: A History of Britain from Suez to the Beatles. London: Little, Brown. 2005. ISBN 978-0-316-86083-3. OCLC 57355011.
- White Heat: A History of Britain in the Swinging Sixties. London: Little, Brown. 2006. ISBN 978-0-316-72452-4. OCLC 475427807.
- State of Emergency: The Way We Were: Britain, 1970–1974. London: Allen Lane. 2010. ISBN 978-1-846-14031-0. OCLC 762352562.
- Mad As Hell: The Crisis of the 1970s and the Rise of the Populist Right. New York: Alfred A. Knopf. 2011. ISBN 978-1-400-04262-3. OCLC 711985081.
- Seasons in the Sun: The Battle for Britain, 1974–1979. London: Allen Lane. 2012. ISBN 978-1-846-14032-7. OCLC 823589868.
- The Great British Dream Factory: The Strange History of Our National Imagination. London: Allen Lane. 2015. ISBN 978-0-241-00465-4. OCLC 928387209.
- Who Dares Wins: Britain, 1979–1982. London: Allen Lane. 2019. ISBN 978-1-846-14737-1. OCLC 1123871965.
