= Ceri Thomas =

British executive

Ceri Thomas is a British journalist and editor, currently at Tortoise Media. Previously, he also worked as the director of public affairs and communication at Oxford University. A former radio news producer and media executive, he is a former editor of the BBC Radio 4's Today programme and BBC One's Panorama.

== Education ==
Thomas attended St Bartholomew's School in Newbury. In 1985, he took a BA, majoring in French from the then Victoria University of Manchester (now the University of Manchester).

== Career ==
=== LBC and BBC Radio ===
Thomas began his career in broadcasting at London's LBC in 1989 as a producer, remaining with the station until 1991.

He moved to BBC Radio 4 to work as a junior producer with the Today programme in 1995, working on the programme from 1991 to 1997. He was promoted to a senior role on Today in 1995, before later moving to BBC Radio 5 Live in 1998. Initially, a producer for the breakfast programme, Thomas later became Head of News at 5 Live, leaving in 2004. He was subsequently appointed as the BBC's Editor of Newsgathering, before taking a year-long sabbatical to work as a Nieman Fellow in Journalism at Harvard University. On returning to the BBC in 2006, he became editor of Radio 4's Today programme.

In March 2010, while discussing the domination of male presenters on the Today programme during an interview on Radio 4's Feedback (only one out of five was then female), he suggested the show was too tough an environment for women, although he did also say the mix of male and female on the programme was "not ideal". Shortly afterwards, he wrote in a Guardian article that the comments had been meant in the context of "a wider news world in which women have not been well represented in senior positions".

=== BBC Television ===
In November 2012, Thomas was appointed Acting Deputy Director of News at the BBC after the then-incumbent, Stephen Mitchell, stepped aside in the wake of the controversy surrounding a report on the BBC Two current affairs programme Newsnight. A clandestine visit to North Korea in March 2013 for an edition of Panorama involving the journalist John Sweeney and a group of students from the London School of Economics led to discontent between the BBC and the university with claims that the students lives had been put at risk without their consent. Thomas described the programme as "an important piece of public interest journalism" and defended putting the students lives at risk.

In October 2014, Thomas began work formally as Editor of Panorama. He had been acting editor since the previous May when his predecessor, Tom Giles, had stepped down.

It was announced in June 2016 that he was leaving the BBC to take up a post as the director of public affairs and communication at Oxford University. He assumed this role in the autumn of 2016. Thomas was succeeded by Rachel Jupp as the editor of Panorama.

=== Tortoise Media ===
Since 2019, Thomas has been at Tortoise Media, where he heads up the audio team.

Media offices
Preceded by Tom Giles	Editor of Panorama; 2014–2016	Succeeded by Rachel Jupp
Preceded by Stephen Mitchell	BBC Deputy Director of News; 2012–2014	Succeeded by ?
Preceded by Kevin Marsh	Editor of Today; 2006–2012	Succeeded by Jamie Angus
Preceded by ?	BBC Radio 5 Live Head of News; 2001–2004	Succeeded by ?
Preceded by ?	Editor of 5 Live Breakfast; 1998–2001	Succeeded by ?
