= Kevin Marsh =

English news editor (born 1954)

Kevin Marsh (born 14 November 1954) is the Editor of the BBC College of Journalism.

== Early life ==
Marsh was born in 1954 in Doncaster, West Riding of Yorkshire to John and Elizabeth Jill Marsh. He attended Doncaster Grammar School from 1966–73 and became Captain of School, as well as Captain of Cricket. He read Classics and English at Christ Church, Oxford and gained an MA in 1978. He also wrote for Isis magazine.

== Career ==
=== BBC ===
He joined the BBC as a news trainee in 1978. After working in Blackburn, Birmingham, and Belfast, he joined the BBC Radio 4 Programme, The World at One - then presented by Sir Robin Day.

In 1986, he joined ITN and returned to the BBC at the beginning of 1988 as Deputy editor of The World at One. In August 1989 he became Editor of PM, moving on three years later to edit The World at One. In 1996, he became joint editor of both The World at One and PM and in 1998, launched the new Sunday morning news programme Broadcasting House, presented by Eddie Mair.

=== Today programme ===
He became editor of the Today programme in November 2002, succeeding Rod Liddle who had resigned the previous September. In May 2003, Today became embroiled in a row with the Government over an early morning claim made by reporter Andrew Gilligan that the Government "probably knew" that one of the key claims made in its September 2002 dossier detailing Iraq's WMD "was wrong". Marsh did not give evidence to Lord Hutton during the subsequent inquiry; Hutton criticised the editing procedures on Today.

=== BBC College of Journalism ===
In April 2006, Marsh left Today to become Editor at the BBC College of Journalism, a new venture that was set up in 2005 in the wake of the Hutton report and the recommendations of the Neil committee which examined the BBC's response to the inquiry's findings. The College is not a physical entity but an e-learning online set of courses.

Marsh was a participant and panellist at the World Economic Forum annual meetings in Davos in 2004, 2005 and 2006, is a visiting fellow at Bournemouth University Media School, a fellow of the Royal Society of Arts and a member of Chatham House.

== Personal life ==
He married Melissa Sue Fletcher in 1979, and they have a son and daughter.

Media offices
Preceded by Rod Liddle	Editor of Today; 2002–2006	Succeeded by Ceri Thomas
