= Obese: A Year to Save My Life =

British documentary show

- Also known as: Fat: The Fight of My Life
- Genre: Documentary
- Directed by: Luke Campbell
- Starring: Jessie Pavelka
- Country of origin: United Kingdom
- Original language: English
- No. of series: 1
- No. of episodes: 9

Production
- Producer: Luke Campbell
- Cinematography: Luke Campbell
- Running time: 60 mins (inc. adverts)

Original release
- Network: Sky1
- Release: 2 January – 27 February 2012

Obese: A Year to Save My Life is a British documentary, reality, weight loss show that was broadcast on Sky1 from 2 January to 27 February 2012, produced, directed and filmed by Luke Campbell and Adam Kaleta. Nine episodes were originally created for the first series, which starred American fitness expert Jessie Pavelka. Pavelka helped nine morbidly obese British men and women help battle against their weight over the length of a year. The program finished after one series but was renamed and brought back in 2013 as Fat: The Fight of My Life which ran for another 10 episodes.

== Series ==
=== Obese: A Year to Save My Life ===
Episode	Air Date	Person	Start Weight	End Weight
01	2 January 2012	Julie	25 stone	16 stone
02	9 January 2012	Jack		
03	16 January 2012	Liz	34 stone	24 stone 2 pounds
04	23 January 2012	Claire		
05	30 January 2012	Dean		
06	6 February 2012	Bev		
07	13 February 2012	Sandy		
08	20 February 2012	Lee		
09	27 February 2012	Sharon		
