= Nancy Nova =

British singer

- Born: Carol Ann Holness
- Origin: London, England
- Genres: Disco, new wave
- Occupation(s): Singer, songwriter
- Labels: FX Records
- Website: nancynova.com

Carol Ann Holness, better known by her stage name Nancy Nova, is a British former singer and songwriter who was mostly active from 1978 to 1983. She is the daughter of former Blockbusters host Bob Holness and sister of Ros Holness, who was a member of 1980s new-wave group Toto Coelo.

== Biography ==
Nova attended Bristol Old Vic Theatre School for three years from the age of 18. She initially found success as a songwriter for Jesse Green, writing the single "Flip". She was a featured artist on the Italian television programme Non Stop for six weeks and her single, "Akiri Non Stop", was used as the theme music for the show. Her 1981 single, "The Force", received radio airplay and was a hit in the dance charts. She was a founder member of Toto Coelo, but left before they achieved popularity due to her signing a worldwide recording contract with EMI.

She has also written songs and sang backing vocals for Lena Zavaroni and Cleo Laine. Though quiet for most of the 1980s and 1990s, in 2004 Nova released through her FX records label a compilation album of her 1980s songs on CD, entitled The Force. A year later, an album of new material in a jazz style was released, entitled Nancy Sings Jazz. Her latest album, Blowout (2007), was only available through iTunes. In 2010 FX records released Super Nova, a compilation of new versions of 8 older songs (from the 1980s, with and extra remix of The Force) and 5 newer songs (1 from Nancy Sings Jazz and 4 from Blowout, same versions as on these albums).

She was noted in the Guinness Book of British Hit Singles & Albums for being in the charts the same week as her sister (4 September 1982).

== Discography ==
=== Albums ===
- Akiri Non Stop (1978, Derby)
- The Force (CD) (2004, FX Records)
- Nancy Sings Jazz (2005, FX Records)
- Blowout (2007, iTunes only, FX Records)
- Super Nova (CD) (2010, FX Records)

=== Singles ===
- "No Way" (1978, Vogue)
- "Akiri Non Stop" (1978, Derby)
- "Heaven" (1979, Ritz/Derby)
- "Heaven" (1980, Hansa)
- "The Force" (1981, Ritz/Hansa)
- "Made in Japan" (1982, EMI)
- "No, No, No" (1982, EMI) – UK #63; Portugal No. 3
- "Lifeline" (1983, EMI)

=== Compilation appearances ===
- Modern Heroes (TV Records 1982) - featured "Made in Japan"
- Twelve Inches of Pleasure (Proto Records 1983) – featured "The Force"

== Releases as songwriter ==
=== Singles ===
- Jesse Green – "Flip" (co-writer) (EMI Records, 1976) – UK No. 26
- Sue - "Tip for the Top" (co-writer)
- Richard E Grant & Orpheus - "To Be Or Not To Be" (co-writer) (Avex, 1997)

=== Albums ===
- Cleo Laine – Return to Carnegie – "Direction" (co-writer)
- Geordie – Save The World – "You Do This To Me" (co-writer)
