= Helen Hayes (politician) =

British politician

Helen Hayes MP
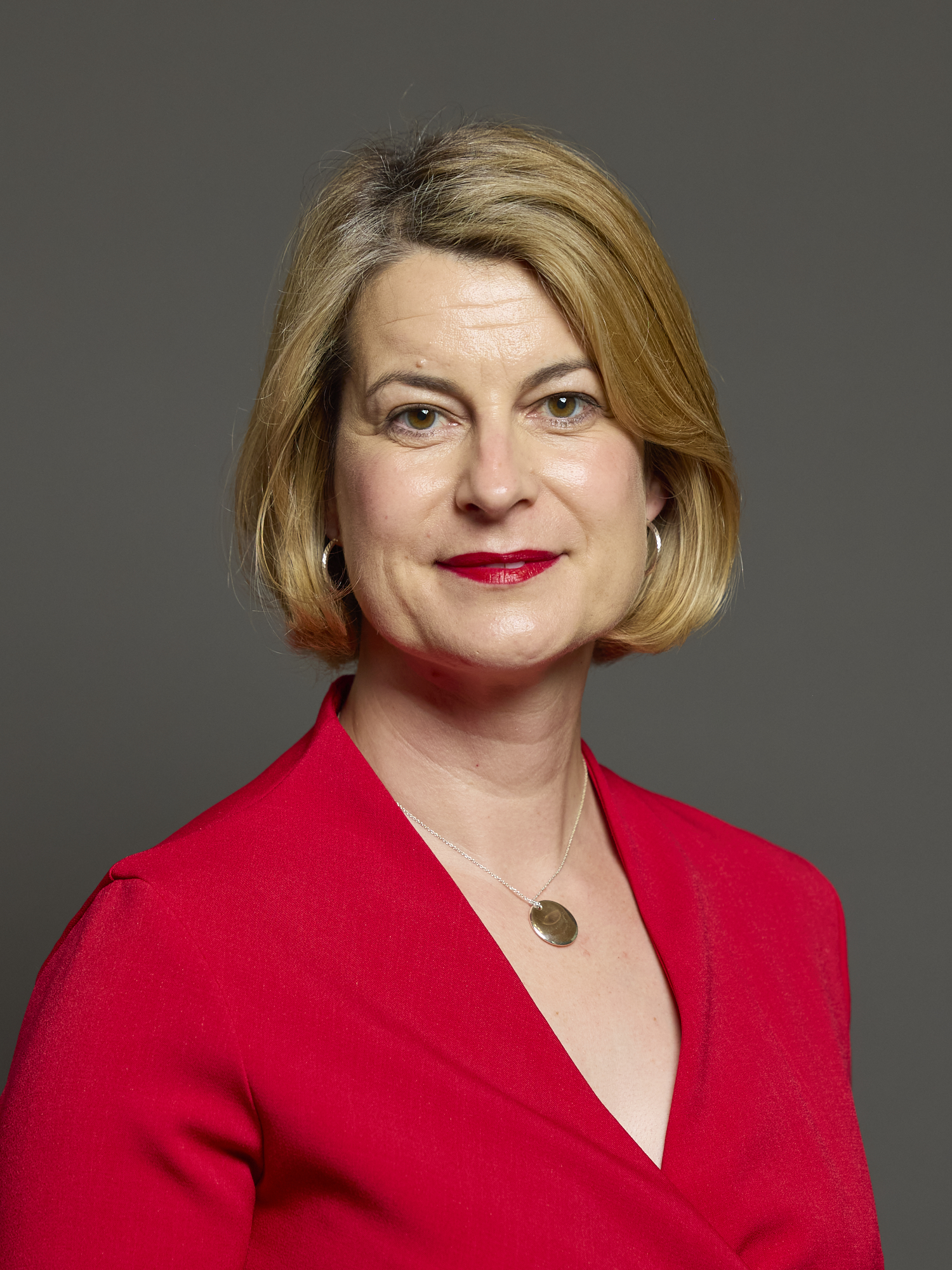
- Official portrait, 2024

Chair of the Education Committee
- Incumbent
- Assumed office 11 September 2024
- Preceded by: Robin Walker

Member of Parliament for Dulwich and West Norwood
- Incumbent
- Assumed office 7 May 2015
- Preceded by: Dame Tessa Jowell
- Majority: 18,789 (41.4%)

Personal details
- Born: Helen Elizabeth Hayes; 8 August 1974 (age 52) Liverpool, England
- Party: Labour
- Education: Balliol College, Oxford
- Website: www.helenhayes.org.uk

Helen Elizabeth Hayes (born 8 August 1974) is a British Labour Party politician who has been Member of Parliament (MP) for Dulwich and West Norwood since 2015. She was elected chair of the House of Commons Education Select Committee in September 2024.

== Early life and career ==
Helen Hayes was born on 8 August 1974 in Liverpool and attended Ormskirk Grammar School. She was an undergraduate at Balliol College, Oxford.

After university, Hayes worked as a town planner. She became managing partner of her own town planning company, Urban Practitioners, before becoming a partner at London architectural practice Allies and Morrison.

Hayes is a Chartered Member of the Royal Town Planning Institute, a member of the King's College Hospital NHS Foundation Trust and is also a trustee of Turner Contemporary art gallery in Margate.

Before being elected as an MP, Hayes was elected as a councillor for the College ward of Southwark Council in 2010 and in 2014. Following her election as an MP in 2015 she held both roles for 10 months before resigning as a councillor in March 2016 to focus on her Parliamentary duties.

== Parliamentary career ==
Hayes was elected to Parliament at the 2015 general election as MP for Dulwich and West Norwood with 54.1% of the vote and a majority of 16,122.

Hayes has served on the Housing, Communities and Local Government Committee since July 2015.

She supported Remain in the EU referendum in June 2016 and voted against the triggering of Article 50 in February 2017.

She was a critic of former Labour leader Jeremy Corbyn and supported Owen Smith in the failed attempt to replace him in the 2016 leadership election.

At the snap 2017 general election, Hayes was re-elected as MP for Dulwich and West Norwood with an increased vote share of 69.6% and an increased majority of 28,156.

In 2018, Hayes criticised the closure of two Royal Mail delivery offices in her constituency.

Hayes was again re-elected at the 2019 general election, with a decreased vote share of 65.5% and a decreased majority of 27,310.

In the November 2021 British shadow cabinet reshuffle, she returned to the frontbench as Shadow Minister for Children and Early Years, replacing Tulip Siddiq.

At the 2024 general election, Hayes was again re-elected with a decreased vote share of 60.3% and a decreased majority of 18,789. She was subsequently elected Chair of the House of Commons Education Select Committee in September 2024.

In November 2024, Hayes voted against the Terminally Ill Adults (End of Life) Bill, which proposes to legalise assisted dying.

In the 2025 Labour Party deputy leadership election, she supported Lucy Powell.

== Personal life ==
Hayes is married to Ben Jupp; the couple have two children. Her sister-in law is Rachel Jupp, director of BBC News

Parliament of the United Kingdom
Preceded by Tessa Jowell	Member of Parliament for Dulwich and West Norwood; 2015–present	Incumbent
