= Sitara Hewitt =

Canadian actress

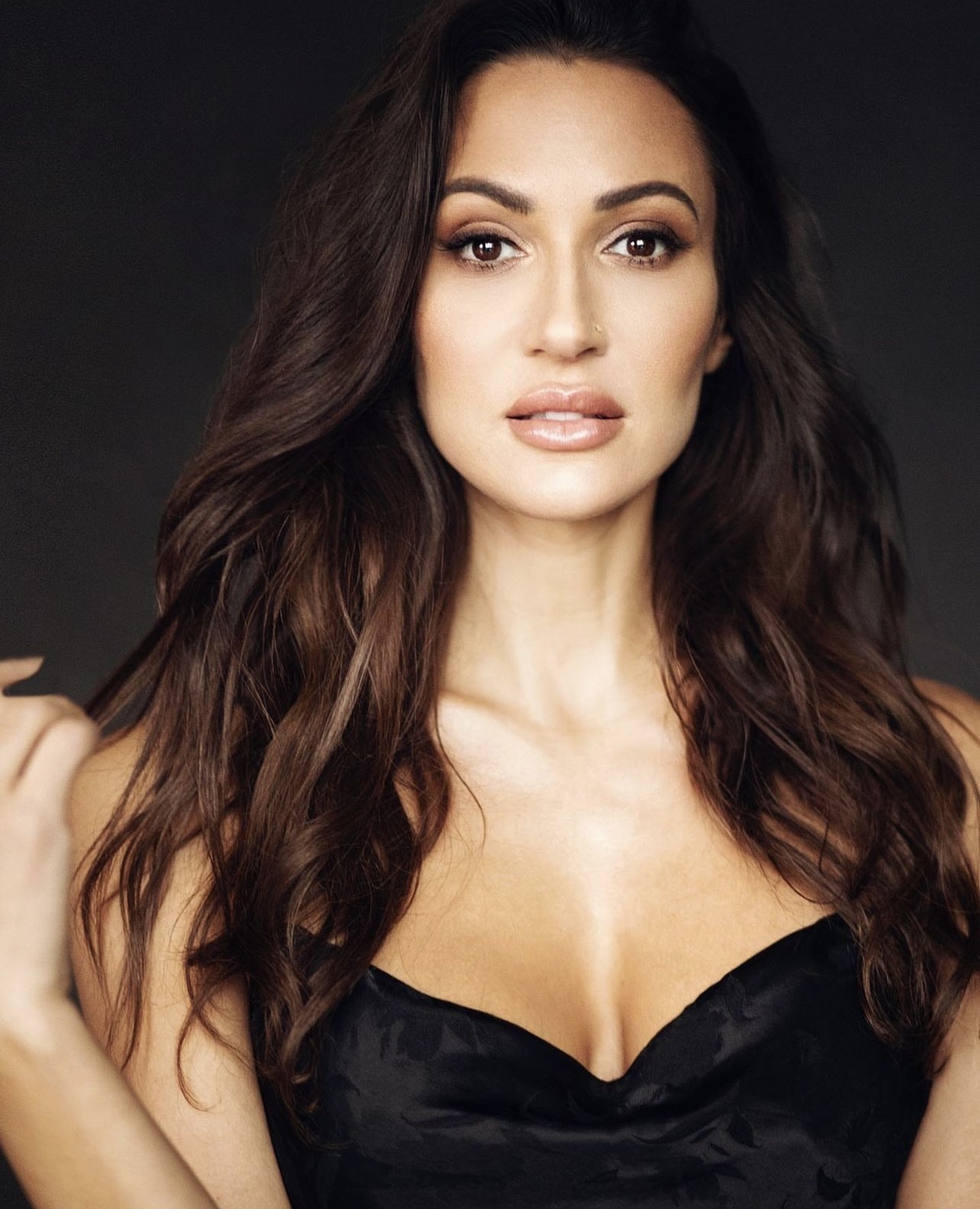
- Hewitt in 2021
- Born: December 27, 1981 (age 44); Elora, Ontario, Canada
- Other name: Tara Hewitt
- Occupations: Actress, model
- Years active: 2002–present
- Spouse: Jessie Pavelka (m. 2008; div. 2016)
- Children: 1

Sitara Hewitt (also known as Tara Hewitt; born December 27, 1981) is a Canadian-American film and television actress and model.

== Background ==
Sitara Hewitt is the daughter of a Pakistani mother, Farida Hewitt and a Welsh father, Kenneth Hewitt. Her parents are professors at Wilfrid Laurier University. Sitara was raised primarily in Elora, Ontario, where she attended St. John's-Kilmarnock School. During her childhood she spent time living in the Himalayan mountains, specifically in the Hunza Valley of Gilgit-Baltistan where her parents did their academic field research on both the glaciers and in the small villages in the valleys.

Hewitt was married to American actor Jessie Pavelka and they have a son, Rowan, who was born in 2010. Pavelka and Hewitt separated in 2015 and divorced late 2016. She is fluent in both Urdu, and English and is semi-fluent in Balti. Hewitt was raised Christian as both of her parents are Anglican Christians. Her first name "Sitara", means "star" in Urdu.

Hewitt revealed in a post that she had been a citizen of the United States for some time.

== Career ==
In Canada Hewitt starred on CBC Television's Little Mosque on the Prairie as Dr. Rayyan Hamoudi for 6 seasons. She is known across America as the Spokesperson for Hughesnet internet. She was a recurring on CBS's The Young and the Restless as well as on All Rise and plays the lead in several Hallmark Movies. She was also a co-host on the Comedy Network's pop-culture game show You Bet Your Ass.

She owns a Meditation company, and is a wellness expert. Hewitt also hosted TV shows for Sportsnet and TSN while studying acting in Toronto and trained with World Wrestling Entertainment in the United States.

== Filmography ==
Television and film roles
Year	Title	Role	Notes
2002	Bollywood/Hollywood	Dancer	
2003	Code	Sara	Short
2005	Sohni Sapna	Evil Sister	Short
2005	Fragile	Zahra	
2006	Bolly Double	Cham-Cham	
2007–2012	Little Mosque on the Prairie	Rayyan Hamoudi	Lead Role
2011	Lost Girl	Lita	Episode: Can't See the Fae-Rest
2013	Cracked	Juvina Kapoor	Episode: Inquest
2013	Torment	Deputy	
2017	My Crazy Sex	Sara	Episode: Love Hurts
2017	Escape the Night	Blue Harpy	Episodes: The Gingerbread Woman and Endless Winter Night
2017	Criminal Minds	Billie Williams	Episode: Lucky Strikes
2017-2018	Past Malice	Adelle Fisher	Episodes: Site Unseen: An Emma Fielding Mystery and Past Malice: An Emma Fielding Mystery
2018	The Young and the Restless	Helen Wallace	3 episodes
2018	Dirty John	Casey	Episode: Red Flags and Parades
2019	The Fusion Generation	Catherine	Teejay Sahota
2019	All Rise	Priya Chavan	Episode: A View from the Bus
2019	The Michael Jackson Magical Moon-Tour	Eve Zarifa	
2020	Hudson & Rex	Vanessa Maddox	Episode: Old Dog, New Tricks
