= Jessie Pavelka =

American fitness expert and television host

- Born: September 26, 1982 (age 43); Corpus Christi, Texas, U.S.
- Occupations: Fitness expert, television host
- Spouse: Sitara Hewitt (m. 2008; div. 2016)
- Children: 1
- Relatives: Jake Pavelka (cousin)
- Website: jessiepavelka.com

Jessie Pavelka (born September 26, 1982) is an American health and well-being expert, author, coach, and TEDx speaker. He is the co-founder of Pavelka Wellness. Pavelka is known as a fitness professional and television host.

In the United Kingdom, he was the presenter of Obese: A Year to Save My Life on Sky1 and Fat: The Fight of My Life on Sky Living HD. He joined the 16th season of The Biggest Loser as a new trainer in the fall of 2014.

== Personal life ==
Pavelka was educated at Calallen High School in northwest Corpus Christi, Texas (1997–2001) and the University of North Texas (2001–2003). At UNT, he studied business and was certified as a trainer.

Pavelka had been involved in athletics from an early age; his mother took him to the track from 4th grade and he played football in both his senior year and at college, although he later gave this up after sixteen years devoted to the sport. This choice allowed him to put more effort into health and fitness.

Pavelka states that Ed Conners gave him his first break in the industry, encouraging him to enter his first bodybuilding competition at the age of 20, where he came in fourth.

He frequently flew to Los Angeles from this point on, to continue bodybuilding/shoots and started a personal training business. Having become disenchanted with a bodybuilding lifestyle, Pavelka gave it up and worked for a commercial construction company in Texas for about a year.

On July 7, 2007, Pavelka decided to move to California, citing a "spiritual experience"—spurred on to write a five and ten-year career plan. He eventually moved to Long Beach, California on September 2, 2007, where he has since emphasized promoting a holistic healthy lifestyle.

Since then, he has appeared in numerous fitness magazines, and, by October 2008, had appeared as a cover model on three titles in the space of only six months.

In October 2013, Pavelka launched his Pavelka Health Revolution brand with his UK publicist Jill Tipping. The company delivers well-being workshops and seminars throughout the UK.

Pavelka has several tattoos: a Japanese character on his left shoulder, a cross on his right arm, an inscription for 'Tomb Digger' in Chinese characters on his stomach, the words 'For My Brother' on his side, the Greek letters alpha and omega on his wrist, a cross ring on his left ring finger, and flame patterns on his back by his shoulders.

Pavelka was married to Canadian film and television actress Sitara Hewitt. They have a son, Rowan, who was born in 2010. Pavelka's parents are divorced; his mother lives in Corpus Christi and his father in Denton. He is a cousin of television personality and former The Bachelor participant Jake Pavelka. Pavelka separated from his wife Sitara Hewitt in mid-2015 and divorce was final late 2016. They co-parent and remain friends.

== Film and television ==
Pavelka has recently increased his media profile via his work as a trainer on the Lifetime reality series DietTribe. He originally did not want to do a reality show, but realized DietTribe's concept could have a significant impact on its audience. His agent, Gar Lester, suggested he audition - which also involved him putting together a diet and exercise program. The first season was shown on Lifetime from January 5, 2009, 10/9c and a second season aired 2009.

In October 2008, Pavelka announced he would appear in a comedy web series The Rise and Fall of Tuck Johnson, playing the character Peter Porker.

On January 19, 2009, Pavelka appeared as himself in an episode of the Lifetime sitcom Rita Rocks, titled "It's My Party".

Pavelka appeared as a lead motivator in the British TV series Obese: A Year to Save My Life in 2012. The series focuses on super morbidly obese individuals who transform their lives over a one-year period involving diet and exercise.

In July 2013, he hosted the Sky Living docu-series Fat: The Fight of My Life, in which he once again motivates and supports ten morbidly obese people as they lose weight, get healthier and improve their quality of life.

In January 2014, he co-hosted a number of segments called "Motivation Nation" for the ITV Breakfast programme Daybreak in the United Kingdom.

On June 30, 2014, Pavelka was announced as one of two new trainers on the 16th season of The Biggest Loser, which will air in the United States this fall/autumn.

In January 2015, he joined the team on Good Morning Britain to launch their campaign of 'Sugar Free GMB'. He then returned again at the end of May to see what progress has been done 6 months on.

== Filmography ==
Year	Title	Role	Notes
2006	Friday Night Lights	Team captain	Uncredited; episode: "Pilot"
2009	DietTribe	Himself	13 episodes
2009	Rita Rocks	Jessie	Episode: "It's My Party"
2009	The Rise and Fall of Tuck Johnson	Peter Porker	Web series; 5 episodes
2009	12 Men of Christmas	Henry	Television film
2012	Obese: A Year to Save My Life	Himself	Host; 9 episodes
2012	The Charon Incident	Clay Davidson	Short film
2013	Fat: The Fight of My Life	Himself	Host; 10 episodes
2014	ITV Daybreak - Motivation Nation	Himself	Trainer, Presenter
2014	The Biggest Loser	Himself	Trainer, Season 16
