= DietTribe =

American television series

- Genre: Documentary; Reality
- Country of origin: United States
- Original language: English
- No. of seasons: 2
- No. of episodes: 13

Production
- Executive producers: Annie Price; Jennifer Davidson; Kris Curry; Scott Templeton; Tara Sandler
- Producer: Courtney Paulson
- Production company: Pie Town Productions

Original release
- Network: Lifetime
- Release: January 5 – November 20, 2009

DietTribe is an American documentary-reality series on Lifetime. The series chronicles the weight loss efforts of groups of friends suffering from obesity, and debuted on January 5, 2009.

== Overview ==
Each 60-minute episode follows the weight-loss efforts of a group of five friends, coached by personal trainer Jessie Pavelka and psychotherapist Stacy Kaiser. In each season the group is followed for 120 days, given specific diet and exercise guidelines and regular weigh-ins to monitor their progress.

== Episodes ==
=== Season 1 (2009) ===
No.	Title	Original release date
1	"The Diet Begins"	January 5, 2009
2	"Formal Wear and Football"	January 12, 2009
3	"Climb Every Mountain"	January 19, 2009
4	"What Happens in Vegas?"	January 26, 2009
5	"The Final Weigh-In"	February 2, 2009

=== Season 2 (2009) ===
No.	Title	Original release date
1	"Leap of Faith"	October 2, 2009
2	"Temptations"	October 9, 2009
3	"The Cold Hard Truth"	October 16, 2009
4	"Intervention"	October 23, 2009
5	"Greatest Fears"	October 30, 2009
6	"Starting Over"	November 6, 2009
7	"No Turning Back"	November 13, 2009
8	"The Finish Line"	November 20, 2009
