= Nick Pollard =

British journalist (born 1950)

- Born: 15 November 1950 (age 75); Birkenhead, England
- Education: Birkenhead School
- Occupation: Journalist
- Known for: Former head of Sky News

George Nicholas Pollard (born 15 November 1950) is a British journalist and the former head of Sky News.

== Early life and education ==
Pollard was born in Birkenhead and attended Birkenhead School, an independent school in the town.

== Career in journalism ==
Pollard started his career in journalism as a reporter at the Birkenhead News, and later worked for the BBC from 1977 to 1980 in Liverpool and London.

=== ITN ===
He was executive producer at ITN from 1987 to 1992 on the News at Ten. He was a television journalist at ITN from 1980 to 1992. He produced ITN's coverage for the elections in 1987 and 1992.

=== Sky News ===
He joined Sky News, where he worked from 1996 to 2006. In 2009, he was appointed as chief executive of the Services Sound and Vision Corporation (SSVC), responsible for providing broadcasting and cinema services to British forces and their families.

In October 2012, Pollard was appointed to lead an inquiry into the BBC following allegations of sexual abuse by the late broadcaster and disc jockey Jimmy Savile. Pollard's remit was to look at why an investigation into Savile's activities by journalists on the BBC Two news programme Newsnight was dropped shortly before it was due to be transmitted. His report was published in December 2012 and concluded that the decision to drop the original Newsnight report in December 2011 was "flawed", but that it had not been done to protect programmes prepared as tributes to Savile. His report criticised George Entwistle, at that time Director of BBC Vision, for apparently failing to read emails warning him of Savile's "dark side", and stated that, after the allegations against Savile eventually became public, the BBC fell into a "level of chaos and confusion [that] was even greater than was apparent at the time".

In July 2014, Pollard launched Forces TV, run by Services Sound and Vision Corporation (SSVC).

=== China Global Television Network ===
In December 2018, he joined China Global Television Network (CGTN) as a consultant and advisor. He resigned in September 2019, citing CGTN's failure to comply with Ofcom's rules on impartiality in connection to its coverage of the Hong Kong anti-extradition bill protests.

Media offices
Preceded by	Head of Sky News; 1996 – June 2006	Succeeded by John Ryley
