= Bob Holness =

South African broadcaster (1928–2012)

- Holness in 1989
- Born: Robert Wentworth John Holness; 12 November 1928; Vryheid, Natal, South Africa
- Died: 6 January 2012 (aged 83); Pinner, London, England
- Education: Maidstone College of Art
- Occupations: Presenter; actor
- Years active: 1955–2006
- Television: Take a Letter; Blockbusters; Raise the Roof; Call My Bluff
- Spouse: Mary Rose Clifford (m. 1955)
- Children: 3, including Carol

Robert Wentworth John Holness (12 November 1928 – 6 January 2012) was a South African radio and television presenter. He presented the British version of Blockbusters.

== Early life ==
Holness was born in Vryheid, Natal, South Africa. His grandfather had been a mining engineer and prospector; Holness's father succeeded him in these mining activities, "and regularly drove across Natal, paying out the wages at the mines, and returning with lumps of gold that had been discovered". When he was seven, his family moved to England, initially to Herne Bay, Kent, where his grandfather Nathaniel had been brought up, then later to Ashford, Kent. After attending Ashford Grammar School and briefly Eastbourne College, Holness went on to Maidstone College of Art (now the University for the Creative Arts). He then returned to South Africa and worked for a printing company.

== Career ==
After moving back to South Africa in the 1950s, Holness took a printing job but gave it up after only two months to join a British repertory company in Durban.

=== Radio career ===
In 1955, Holness took his first job as a radio presenter and a year later became the second actor to portray James Bond (after Barry Nelson in the 1954 television special Casino Royale) in a radio production of Moonraker for the SABC's Springbok Radio.

Holness joined the BBC as a presenter on Late Night Extra, initially on the BBC Light Programme and later on Radio 1 and Radio 2, presenting alongside Terry Wogan, Michael Parkinson and Keith Fordyce. From 1971, the show was broadcast solely on Radio 2. He moved to independent radio and co-presented the award-winning breakfast-time AM Programme alongside Douglas Cameron on London's LBC radio station between 1975 and 1985. Holness originally joined the station as an airborne traffic reporter, later progressing to reading networked news bulletins for IRN. He won the Variety Club Award for 'Joint Independent Radio Personality of the Year' in both 1979 and 1984.

From 1985 to 1997, Holness returned to Radio 2, presenting many shows including Bob Holness Requests the Pleasure and Bob Holness and Friends, as well as covering various weekday shows for holidaying presenters. From the late 1960s until 1998, he presented the request programme Anything Goes on the BBC World Service.

=== Television career ===
In 1962, Holness became the host of UK game show Take a Letter, and relief host of Thames Television's magazine programme Today in 1968. From 1983 until 1995 he presented the British version of Blockbusters, for which he is probably best known. Holness starred in a celebrity special of Catchphrase in 1988, and later appeared again with his daughter, Carol, in a Christmas version of Family Catchphrase, he was also on the 1988 Christmas edition of Bullseye partnered with Eric Bristow. In 1990 he was the subject of This Is Your Life.

Holness hosted Yorkshire Television's big-budget game show flop Raise the Roof, in 1995, before becoming the chairman of a revived Call My Bluff for the BBC. Holness appeared on one episode of Ant and Dec's Saturday Night Takeaway in 2004, when he presented the last round of Ant and Dec's Blockbusters, with Ant as a contestant.

Aside from presenting, Holness had an occasional acting career in television shows including Thriller, Rex the Runt and The Impressionable Jon Culshaw.

== "Baker Street" ==
Holness was the subject of an urban myth, claimed to have been initiated in the 1980s by broadcaster Stuart Maconie who, writing for the New Musical Express in a section called 'Believe It or Not', said that Holness had played the saxophone riff on Gerry Rafferty's 1978 song "Baker Street". The actual performer was Raphael Ravenscroft. Tommy Boyd has disputed Maconie's claim to authorship of the rumour, however, saying he was the first to make the claim, while a DJ on London's LBC, looking for false stories for a quiz.

== Personal life and death ==
Holness met his wife, former actress Mary Rose Clifford, in repertory theatre in South Africa. The couple married in 1955 before they returned to England in 1961, originally living with Mary's family in London, before moving to Manchester. Three years later, the family relocated to north-west London, settling in Pinner. The pair had three children: a son, Jonathan, and two daughters, Carol Ann (aka Nancy Nova) and Ros, singers and members of the band Toto Coelo.

Holness gave his support to many charities, including the children's charities Teenage Cancer Trust, Young People's Trust for the Environment and National Children's Home (now Action for Children), of which he was vice-president from 1994.

On 24 November 2002, Holness suffered a major stroke, following which a brain scan revealed he had previously suffered a number of transient ischaemic attacks over several years. He also suffered from hearing loss. Holness was diagnosed with coeliac disease in 2005. In the last few years of his life he suffered from vascular dementia and was cared for by his family at their home in Pinner until the last two weeks of his life when he entered Denville Hall nursing home. On 6 January 2012, Holness' family announced that he had died earlier that day, in his sleep, at the age of 83. His wife died on 26 June 2020 in Pinner, London. He had seven grandchildren.

== See also ==
- List of people diagnosed with coeliac disease
