= Raise the Roof (game show) =

- Genre: Game show
- Created by: Stephen Leahy; Andrew O'Connor
- Presented by: Bob Holness
- Voices of: Charles Foster
- Country of origin: United Kingdom
- Original language: English
- No. of series: 1
- No. of episodes: 17

Production
- Running time: 30 minutes (inc. adverts)
- Production companies: Yorkshire Television and Action Time

Original release
- Network: ITV
- Release: 2 September 1995 – 13 January 1996

Raise the Roof was a British television game show which ran from 2 September 1995 to 13 January 1996 for ITV and was hosted by Bob Holness.

== History and gameplay ==
Raise the Roof was one of the first game shows to exploit the lifting of the Independent Television Commission's prize limits, by having a large, valuable house as the star prize. The format featured several rounds of questions which progressively whittled the contestant pool from six to one. The final round offered the house as the grand prize. Eliminated contestants kept whatever money they earned; in addition, the lowest-scoring player in each round also received "Bob's Bungalow" – a cottage-shaped teapot.

=== Format ===
==== Round 1: The Lucky Seven ====
The six contestants answered seven true/false statements of increasing value: £50, £55, £60, £70, £80, £85, and £100. A correct response added the value to the contestant's score, but a miss reset their score to zero. At the end of the round, the three highest-scoring contestants advanced to the second round. If there was a tie for low score, the contestant with the most correct answers advanced. If they were tied in this respect as well, one last true/false tiebreaker was asked and the contestant who responded correctly in the shortest time would advance. Contestants could win up to £500 in this round. Contestants who tied for low scores and were eliminated each received Bob's Bungalow.

==== Round 2: Bid and Break ====
The three remaining contestants were each given £500 to wager on six toss-up questions, with a maximum wager of £100 per question. The category for each question was announced before the contestants made their wagers. A correct buzz-in added the contestant's wager to their score and deducted the opponents' wagers from theirs. A miss penalized the contestant accordingly and gave the other two a chance to buzz-in and respond. No contestant could be penalized more than once on any single question. At the end of the round, the contestant with the lowest total for the round was eliminated; the other two advanced. If there was a tie for low score, a tiebreaker toss-up was asked to determine who advanced. Contestants could win up to £1,100 in this round.

==== Round 3 ====
The two remaining contestants were each given £1,000 to wager on five questions, with a maximum wager of £200 per question, and entered separate isolation booths so that they could hear the host but not each other. As in round two, the category for each question was given before the contestants made their wagers. Each contestant gave an answer; a correct answer added the wager to the contestant's score, while a miss deducted it. The contestant with the higher total from this round advanced to the final. If the round ended in a tie, a final question was asked. Contestants could win up to £2,000 in this round, for a potential maximum of £3,600 over the entire game.

If a contestant with mobility impairments advanced to this round, both contestants were sequestered in their isolation booths during the commercial break preceding the round; otherwise, contestants would not be sequestered until the rules of the round were explained.

==== Endgame ====
The contestant chose five categories from a board of 54, each of which contained one question, and had 60 seconds to answer the questions in any order. The clock began to run only after the contestant selected one of the five categories and Holness finished reading its question, and stopped only when the contestant either answered or passed. An incorrect answer put the question out of play, but the contestant could return to passed questions later if time allowed. Four correct answers were needed to win the house; if the contestant ran out of time or missed two questions, they won a consolation prize and Bob's Bungalow instead.

=== Ratings ===
The programme made little impact with the public and was not recommissioned after one series of 17 episodes. A typical audience was 6.1 million viewers as opposed to 13.8 million for BBC1's Casualty. Raise the Roof has since been described as the last example of the era when it was seen as "vulgar" to give away large sums of money and more appropriate to give away prizes of the same value instead. Another criticism was that the questions were too easy to generate real suspense, and the pacing was too slow to keep viewers interested.

Early episodes of the show had both a sponsorship deal with Express Newspapers and a viewer competition where gamecards could be collected freely from all major newsagents and viewers could play along with the show for the chance to win a new house of their own. By the time the series finished however, both the sponsorship and competition were discontinued due to the poor reception of the show, resulting in the final few episodes being edited to remove all traces of the competition.
