= Pop Life (TV series) =

British documentary series about pop music

Pop Life is a British documentary series about pop music, shown on BBC Two, narrated by Suranne Jones. It comprises three episodes, each of which is an hour in duration.

== Episode 1: I'm in a Boy Band! ==
Focusing on Boy Bands from The Beatles to One Direction.

- Air date – 25 February 2012

== Episode 2: I'm in a Girl Group! ==
Focusing on the equivalent female acts.

- Air date – 3 March 2012

== Episode 3: I'm a Pop Star! ==
Focusing on solo acts.

- Air date – 10 March 2012
