= Venice 24/7 =

- Country of origin: United Kingdom
- Original language: English
- No. of series: 1
- No. of episodes: 6 (list of episodes)

Production
- Production location: Venice
- Running time: 30 minutes

Original release
- Network: BBC Four
- Release: 7 March 2012 – present

Venice 24/7 is a British documentary series about the emergency services in Venice. It is shown on BBC Four and comprises six episodes.

== Episode list ==
No.	Title	Original release date
1	"Winter in Venice"	7 March 2012
2	"Carnival"	14 March 2012
3	"City Fit for a Pope"	21 March 2012
4	"The Biennale"	28 March 2012
5	"When the Boats Come In"	4 April 2012
6	"The Grand Finale"	11 April 2012
