= Rachel Jupp =

British television producer (born 1977)

Rachel Jupp (born 1977) is a British television news and current affairs producer who is the current director of BBC News on £400,000 salary. She was the editor of the BBC's Panorama current affairs series from 2016 to 2020 and later led the BBC's editorial work on generative AI.

== Early life ==
Jupp was raised in Twickenham and attended Orleans Park School and Richmond upon Thames College. She read social and political sciences at King's College, Cambridge and studied for an MA in public administration at Columbia University. She worked as an intern for ITN in the United States and a researcher and project manager at the Demos think tank.

== Career ==
Jupp joined Channel 4 News in 2005, where her last post was Head of Home News. She became a Deputy Editor of Newsnight at the BBC in 2013, shortly after Ian Katz became its Editor.

In September 2016, she was appointed Editor of Panorama. She was the second female Editor (the first was Glenwyn Benson 1992 to 1995). Since 2024, she has been involved in developing guidance on the use of generative AI at the BBC.

In October 2026, Jupp was appointed director of BBC News. In this role she has responsibility for 4,500 staff and serves as a member of the BBC's executive committee.

== Personal life ==
Jupp's husband works for ITV News; the couple have children.

Ben, her brother, is Director of Social Finance and was previously head of public services strategy and innovation in the Cabinet Office. He is married to the Labour MP Helen Hayes.

Rachel Jupp is a granddaughter of Rev. Tom Jupp, the Anglican vicar whose involvement was instrumental in the Jewish refugee community's acquisition of the former vicarage that became an early home of Belsize Square Synagogue.
