= The 70s (TV series) =

- Genre: Documentary
- Presented by: Dominic Sandbrook
- Theme music composer: Reigns
- Country of origin: United Kingdom
- Original language: English
- No. of series: 1
- No. of episodes: 4

Production
- Executive producer: Dominic Crossley-Holland
- Producers: Steve Condie; Mary Crisp; Tom McCarthy; Fatima Salaria; Paul Tilzey
- Editors: Damian Leask; Michael Nollet; Rick Barker; Paul Hodgson; Steve Scales
- Camera setup: Justin Evans; Louis Caulfield; Oliver Cheesman

Original release
- Network: BBC Two
- Release: 16 April – 7 May 2012

Related
- The 80s with Dominic Sandbrook

The 70s is a British documentary television series about the 1970s. It was broadcast on BBC Two in four episodes and was presented by Dominic Sandbrook.

== Episode 1: Get It On, 70–72 ==
Air date: 16 April 2012

During this time, homeownership increased and house prices rocketed. More people went abroad on holidays than in previous years. Tens of thousands of Ugandan Asians move to the UK, having been expelled by its dictator Idi Amin. Coal miners caused major problems for the government of Prime Minister Edward Heath.

== Episode 2: Doomwatch, 73–74 ==
Air date: 23 April 2012

During these years, the UK joined what is now the European Union and there were large increases in inflation and the oil price. The sexual revolution gathered pace and environmental awareness became more common.

== Episode 3: Goodbye Great Britain, 75–77 ==
Air date: 30 April 2012

New laws against sex discrimination were introduced, giving women the same rights at work as men. Football hooliganism, the Queen's silver jubilee and punk rock were other features of these years.

== Episode 4: The Winner Takes It All, 77–79 ==
Air date: 7 May 2012

== Reception ==
The first episode was watched by around 2.7 million people (an audience share of 10.3%).

Nigel Farndale of the Sunday Telegraph gave it four stars out of five, saying Sandbrook "knows his subject", with the series being entertaining as well as having "a big idea at the core" — that the decade inspired Thatcherism.
