= Our Man in... =

2012 British documentary television series

- Genre: Documentary
- Country of origin: United Kingdom
- Original language: English
- No. of series: 1
- No. of episodes: 3

Production
- Production company: Screenchannel TV

Original release
- Network: Channel 4
- Release: 1 March – 15 March 2012

Our Man in... is a British documentary television series, filmed in 2011 and broadcast on Channel 4 in 2012. It follows the activities of British consulates in Spain.

== Episode 1 ==
- Ibiza – air date 1 March 2012

== Episode 2 ==
- The Costas – air date 8 March 2012

== Episode 3 ==
- Barcelona and Tenerife – air date 15 March 2012
