= Our Crime =

- Country of origin: United Kingdom
- No. of episodes: 4

Original release
- Network: BBC Three
- Release: April 2 – April 23, 2012

Our Crime is a British documentary series shown on BBC Three about youth crime. The docuseries explores the consequences of youth crime.

== Episode 1: Robbed ==
Air date – 2 April 2012

Teenage robbing sprees.

== Episode 2: Riot ==
Air date – 9 April 2012

The August 2011 riots.

== Episode 3: Speed ==
Air date – 16 April 2012

Car crime being recorded and uploaded online.

== Episode 4: Attacked ==
Air date – 23 April 2012

Camera phones, CCTV and social networking's role in crime.
