= Make Bradford British =

British television documentary series

Make Bradford British is a British television documentary programme broadcast on Channel 4 that looks at the level of integration between Muslim and non-Muslim communities in Bradford, West Yorkshire, England.

It has two episodes, first broadcast on 1 and 8 March 2012.

Ian Greenwood, the leader of Bradford City Council, criticised the programme as reinforcing the idea that Bradford is deeply segregated.

Channel 4 aired a similar documentary, Make Leicester British, on 3 November 2014.
