= Take a Letter (British game show) =

British TV game show (1962–1964)

- Created by: David Housham
- Presented by: Bob Holness
- Country of origin: United Kingdom
- No. of series: 1
- No. of episodes: 128

Production
- Running time: 30 minutes (inc. adverts)
- Production company: Granada

Original release
- Network: ITV
- Release: 10 January 1962 – 24 June 1964

Take a Letter is a game show aired on ITV from 10 January 1962 to 24 June 1964 and is hosted by Bob Holness (then billed as Robert).
