= Ian Hislop's Stiff Upper Lip – An Emotional History of Britain =

- Genre: Documentary
- Directed by: Ian Hislop
- Presented by: Ian Hislop
- Country of origin: United Kingdom
- Original language: English
- No. of seasons: 1
- No. of episodes: 3

Production
- Running time: 55 minutes

Original release
- Network: BBC Two
- Release: 2 October – 15 October 2012

Ian Hislop's Stiff Upper Lip: An Emotional History of Britain is a series of reality television programs originally made in the United Kingdom in 2012. The show involves Private Eye editor Ian Hislop narrating through Victorian England and how they bottled up or let out their feelings, influencing British history.

The documentary consists of three episodes of around 55 minutes each. The presenter explores a range of aspects of Victorian Britain as well as returning to his former school, Ardingly College, where he explains the effect of the English public school in shaping men.

== Episodes ==
No.	Title	Directed by	Original release date
1	"Emergence"	Deborah Lee	2 October 2012
2	"Heyday"	Sally Benton	9 October 2012
3	"Last Hurrah?"	Tom McCarthy	15 October 2012 (Note: First broadcast on BBC Two Scotland. Aired on 16 October 2012 on BBC Two.)

== See also ==
- Stiff upper lip
