= Archive on 4 =

- Other names: The Archive Hour (1998–2009)
- Running time: 57 minutes
- Country of origin: United Kingdom
- Language: English
- Home station: BBC Radio 4
- Original release: 11 April 1998
- No. of episodes: 425
- Website: www.bbc.co.uk/programmes/b00hg8dq/episodes/player

Archive on 4, previously The Archive Hour, is a BBC Radio 4 documentary series. The hour-long programme draws on archive sources from the BBC Sound Archive and beyond, to explore a variety of subjects.

The series features a range of guest presenters and occasionally takes the form of a montage documentary without a presenter.

The programme is broadcast on Saturday evenings at 20:00 in the United Kingdom, with previous editions available on the BBC Sounds website.

The first edition of The Archive Hour, presented by Claire Rayner, was broadcast on 11 April 1998. The programme was renamed Archive on 4 on 3 January 2009.
