= Death Unexplained =

- Country of origin: United Kingdom
- Original language: English
- No. of series: 1
- No. of episodes: 3

Original release
- Network: BBC One
- Release: 7 February 2012 – present

Death Unexplained is a British documentary series about the investigation of deaths in West London. It was shown on BBC One in February 2012 and follows coroner Alison Thompson, pathologists and other staff who deal with over 4,000 cases per year. The team works in co-operation with her to determine the cause of initially unexplained deaths which occur in her jurisdiction. Each episode is 40 minutes long.

== Episode 1 ==
Air date – 7 February 2012

The team investigate three cases. One case was of a man who died in his flat where he lived alone and whose body was not discovered until many weeks later. Despite initial difficulties because of the decomposing condition he was in, his death was determined to have been caused by cirrhosis. Thus an inquest did not need to be held. Both the other cases were young women whose deaths were ruled as suicides at their inquests. Petra (1982–2010), who had anorexia nervosa, died of an overdose of anti-depressants she ordered from abroad on the Internet. Jessica (1983–2011), who had bipolar disorder and was a frequent self-harmer, died of potassium cyanide poisoning in the flat where she lived with her partner.

== Episode 2 ==
Air date – 14 February 2012

The team investigate two cases each of man who has died of external causes:

- A 41-year-old whose body was found in his flat after a fire there. Examination of the deceased showed that he died before the fire spread, and that he died of an overdose of prescription medication. At his inquest, a verdict of suicide was recorded.
- An elderly Spanish restaurateur who, while walking across a road, was accidentally hit by a cyclist and later died of his injuries. A verdict of accidental death was recorded.

== Episode 3 ==
Air date – 21 February 2012

- A Polish, self-employed carpenter in his late 20s was killed by a train after he walked onto the tracks at Hanger Lane Underground station during the early evening of 14 December 2010. The deceased was not a heavy drinker, but had drunk a lot of alcohol on the day of his death. A verdict of accidental death was recorded.
- A retired plasterer in his mid-sixties who had pneumonia is brought to the team because exposure to asbestos was thought to have contributed to his death.
- A 41 year old British man died in New Zealand of injuries he sustained in the 2011 Christchurch earthquake.
