= Fat – The Fight of My Life =

2013 British television series

Fat: The Fight of My Life
- Presented by: Jessie Pavelka
- Country of origin: United Kingdom

Original release
- Release: 2013 – 2013

Fat: The Fight of My Life is a television series where obese people lose weight. Each episode follows a year in the life of an obese person trying to lose weight. Trained by host Jessie Pavelka. It was originally aired in the United Kingdom. The personal trainer John Cammish worked with Leanne Probert for eight months so that she would lose weight. In Probert's episode on the show, the producers checked in with her every other months, giving her challenges to determine what progress she made in losing weight. In another episode, the personal trainer Jade Heath worked with Geoff Trainer, who used to be a taxi driver, for a year to help him lose weight. Trainer's weight loss plan included gym workouts, swimming, walking, and dieting.

== Episodes ==
1. "Bejamin"
2. "Jeni"
3. "Darren"
4. "Alison"
5. "David"
6. "John"
7. "Sarah"
8. "Leanne"
