= John Ryley =

British television producer and head of Sky News

John Hamilton Ryley OBE (born 21 December 1961) is a British media executive, and the former head of Sky News.

== Early life ==
He grew up in East Sussex.

He went to Eastbourne College. He attended Durham University (Hild & Bede) from 1981 to 1984, studying Latin, English and Russian Studies. He planned on becoming a barrister. He later attended the Wharton School of Business in 2006.

== Career ==
He was a radio journalist from 1985 to 1987 at Invicta FM in Kent. His BBC career began as a graduate news trainee in 1987, subsequently working on the BBC's Nine O'Clock News and went on to programme edit ITV's News at Ten. He started at Sky News as executive producer in 1995, moving on to being executive editor and became Head of Sky News in 2006. The UK Press Gazette described him as "The most talented news executive of his generation". In 2009 he launched a successful campaign for Britain's first live televised leaders' debates in the run-up to the 2010 UK general election. " Ryley has changed elections for all our lifetimes," wrote the former Guardian editor Peter Preston. John was recognised by the British television industry with Broadcasts' Individual Achievement Award in 2010. John also played a critical role in the successful campaign for camera's to be introduced into courts in England and Wales, arguing the jury system won't survive if the public are unaware of the way courts work. In 2021 John was given the Royal Television Society's Outstanding Contribution award for journalism. The judges said," He has effected genuine change in our business...his style is innovative, idiosyncratic. His integrity, influence, and authority colossal. He is a Fellow of The Royal Television Society, a Trustee for the National Council for the Training of Journalists, and a former Trustee of The Media Trust, the UK's leading communications charity. He is the chair-elect of the Geddes Trust, set up to encourage high quality journalism in students at Oxford University.

Ryley was appointed Officer of the Order of the British Empire (OBE) in the 2024 New Year Honours for services to journalism.

== Personal life ==
He married Harriet Constable in 1987 and they have one son and two daughters. He lives in Witney in Oxfordshire. His wife (now deceased) was a former reporter for Central South.
