= Stephen Mitchell (journalist) =

British journalist (born 1949)

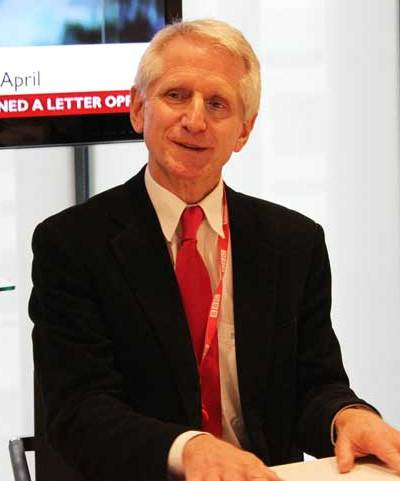
Mitchell in 2012

Stephen Graham Mitchell (born 14 July 1949) is a British journalist who has been Head of News Programmes, BBC, since 2007 and deputy director, BBC News, since 2008. He announced his retirement without payment from the position of Head of BBC news programmes in December 2012 in the wake of the Pollard Report into the Jimmy Savile scandal.

He was educated at Loughborough Grammar School and Manchester University.

He began his journalistic career in newspapers, working for The Times 1971–1974, before moving to the BBC, where he worked in Radio news.
