= Royal Television Society Programme Awards =

Annual British Television Awards

RTS Programme Awards
- Current: #2024 winners
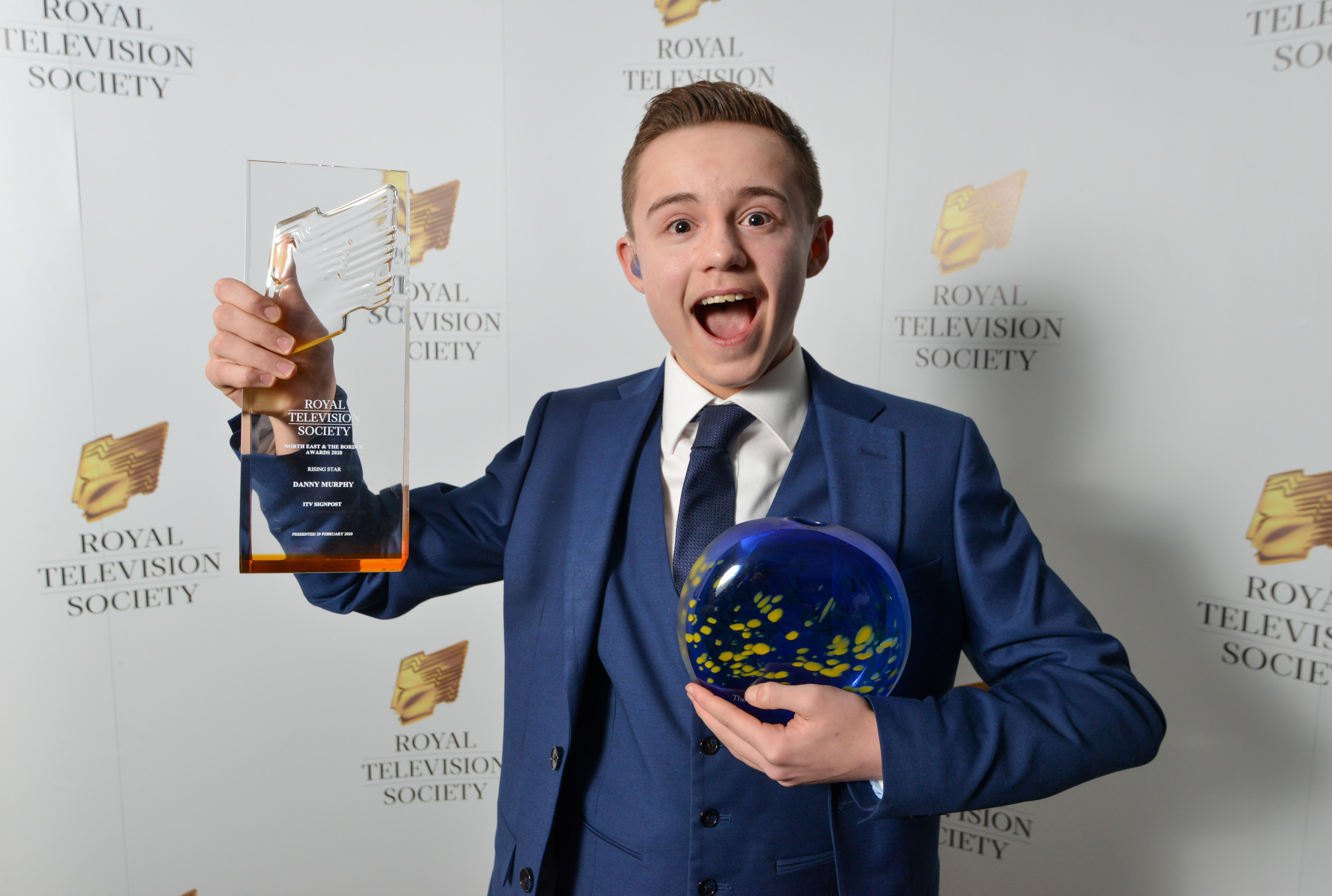
- Actor Danny Murphy in 2020 with an RTS regional award for Rising Star
- Sponsored by: Audio Network
- Location: Grosvenor House Hotel, London
- Country: United Kingdom and Ireland
- Hosted by: Tom Allen
- First award: 1975; 51 years ago
- Website: rts.org.uk/awards/programme-awards

The Royal Television Society Programme Awards, (often referred to as the RTS Awards) seek to recognise programmes or individuals who have made a positive and material contribution to their genre: either because their content or originality in form has in some way moved the genre forward, or perhaps even created a new genre; or because their quality has set standards which other programme-makers can emulate and learn from.

In addition to the national awards and the Craft & Design Awards, the Royal Television Society also hosts a number of regional award ceremonies throughout the UK and Ireland.

== Award categories ==
The original Royal Television Society Programme Awards can be traced back to 1975, when there were just seven categories. In 1989, the categories were revised and awards in these new categories conferred for the award year of 1988. It was also in this year that nominations for some categories were introduced for the very first time. Since 2016, the awards have been primarily focussed on home-grown output, with Fargo, the final winner of the International category in 2015. In 2023, the number of award categories stood at 30.

== Controversies ==
In February 2017 broadcaster Piers Morgan pulled out as host after only three days, citing a public campaign branding him as damaging and inappropriate for the event.

== Judging ==
The RTS Programme Awards winners are selected not by public vote but decided via judging panels composed of industry experts and professionals. In 2016 the make up of the judging panels was adjusted to include more women and people from minority backgrounds. From approximately 200 jurors, 52% were now female and 27% from BAME backgrounds. The move towards more diversity came in the wake of the #OscarsSoWhite campaign. At the time of the 2020 awards, the overall jury composition was 56% female and 32% came from BAME backgrounds.

== Winners: 1998–present ==
2025 winners

Presented: 25 March 2025 – Host: Tom Allen
Award	Winners	Nominees
Outstanding Achievement Award	Claudia Winkleman	–
Judges' Award	Ruth Jones and James Corden	–
Arts	My Sexual Abuse: The Sitcom (Channel 4)	In My Own Words: Alison Lapper (BBC); Camden (Disney+)
Breakthrough Award	Josh Tedeku – Boarders (BBC)	Michelle de Swarte – Spent (BBC); Bethany Asher – Sherwood (BBC)
Children's Programme	Quentin Blake's Box of Treasures (BBC)	Dodo (Sky Kids); BMX All Stars (BBC)
Comedy Drama	Alma's Not Normal (BBC)	Boarders (BBC); Ludwig (BBC)
Comedy Entertainment	Junior Taskmaster (Channel 4)	Have I Got News for You (BBC); Sorry, I Didn't Know (ITV1)
Comedy Performance: Female	Sophie Willan – Alma's Not Normal (BBC)	Aimee Lou Wood – Daddy Issues (BBC); Michelle de Swarte – Spent (BBC)
Comedy Performance: Male	Oliver Savell – Changing Ends (ITV1)	Jim Howick – Here We Go (BBC); Nabhaan Rizwan – Kaos (Netflix)
Daytime Programme	Loose Women (ITV1)	Clive Myrie's Caribbean Adventure (BBC); BBC Breakfast (BBC)
Documentary Series	The Push: Murder on the Cliff (Channel 4)	To Catch a Copper (Channel 4); On Thin Ice: Putin v Greenpeace (BBC)
Drama Series	Industry (BBC and HBO)	Wolf Hall: The Mirror and the Light (BBC and Masterpiece); Supacell (Netflix)
Entertainment	The Traitors (BBC)	Ant & Dec's Saturday Night Takeaway (ITV1); RuPaul's Drag Race UK (BBC)
Entertainment Performance	Anthony McPartlin and Declan Donnelly – Ant & Dec's Saturday Night Takeaway (ITV1)	Steven Frayne – Miracles (Sky Max); Claudia Winkleman – The Traitors (BBC)
Formatted Popular Factual	Freddie Flintoff's Field of Dreams on Tour (BBC)	The Jury: Murder Trial (Channel 4); The Martin Lewis Money Show Live (ITV1)
History	Atomic People (BBC)	Miners' Strike 1984: The Battle for Britain (Channel 4); Helmand: Tour of Duty (BBC)
Leading Actor: Female	Anna Maxwell Martin – Until I Kill You (ITV1)	Ambika Mod – One Day (Netflix); Monica Dolan – Mr Bates vs The Post Office (ITV1)
Leading Actor: Male	Lennie James – Mr Loverman (BBC)	Adeel Akhtar – Showtrial (BBC); Ben Whishaw – Black Doves (Netflix)
Limited Series and Single Drama	This Town (Netflix)	Mr Bates vs The Post Office (ITV1); Breathtaking (ITV1)
Live Event	D Day 80: Tribute to the Fallen (BBC)	Coldplay at Glastonbury 2024 (BBC); The Martin Lewis Money Show Live – Budget Special (ITV1)
Presenter	Liz Carr – Better Off Dead? (BBC)	Joe Tracini – Me and the Voice in My Head (Channel 4); Zuhair Hassan – Big Zuu Goes to Mecca (BBC)
Science & The Natural World	Billy & Molly: An Otter Love Story (National Geographic and Disney+)	Silverback (BBC); Living with Leopards (Netflix)
Scripted Comedy	Things You Should Have Done (BBC)	We Are Lady Parts (Channel 4); Gavin & Stacey: The Finale (BBC)
Single Documentary	Hell Jumper (BBC)	Undercover: Exposing the Far Right (Channel 4); Tell Them You Love Me (Sky Documentaries)
Soap and Continuing Drama	Casualty (BBC)	EastEnders (BBC); Hollyoaks (Channel 4)
Sports Presenter, Commentator or Pundit	Rose Ayling-Ellis and Clare Balding – Paris 2024 Paralympics (Channel 4)	Ian Wright – Euro 2024 (ITV Sport); Michael Johnson – Paris 2024 Olympics (BBC Sport)
Sports Program	Paris 2024 Paralympics (Channel 4)	Paris 2024 Olympics (BBC Sport); London Marathon 2024 (BBC Sport)
Supporting Actor – Female	Jessica Gunning – Baby Reindeer (Netflix)	Monica Dolan – Sherwood (BBC); Katherine Parkinson - Rivals (Disney+)
Supporting Actor – Male	Danny Dyer – Rivals (Disney+)	McKinley Belcher III – Eric (Netflix); Sonny Walker – The Gathering (Channel 4)
Writer – Comedy	Sophie Willan – Alma's Not Normal (BBC)	Writing team – Cunk on Life (BBC and Netflix); Nida Manzoor – We Are Lady Parts (Channel 4)
Writer – Drama	Dominic Treadwell-Collins and Laura Wade – Rivals (Disney)+	Will Smith – Slow Horses (Apple TV+); Peter Straughan – Wolf Hall: The Mirror and the Light (BBC)

2024 winners

Presented: 26 March 2024 – Host: Tom Allen
Award	Winners	Nominees
Outstanding Achievement Award	Stephen Lambert	–
Judges' Award	Mr Bates vs The Post Office (ITV)	–
Arts	Fight the Power: How Hip Hop Changed the World (BBC)	Becoming Frida Kahlo (BBC); Lewis Capaldi: How I'm Feeling Now (Netflix)
Breakthrough Award	Lucy Edwards – Japan - The Way I See It – The Travel Show (BBC)	Ashley Thomas – Great Expectations (BBC One); Hamza Yassin – Hamza: Strictly Birds of Prey (BBC)
Children's Program	A Kind of Spark (CBBC)	FYI Investigates: Kids Who Vape (Sky Kids & Sky News); Tabby McTat (CBBC)
Comedy Drama	Juice (BBC Three)	Big Boys (Channel 4); There She Goes (BBC Two)
Comedy Entertainment	Rob & Romesh Vs (Sky Max)	Taskmaster (Channel 4); The Graham Norton Show (BBC One)
Comedy Performance: Female	Gbemisola Ikumelo – Black Ops (BBC One)	Máiréad Tyers – Extraordinary (Disney+); Kat Sadler – Such Brave Girls (BBC Three)
Comedy Performance: Male	Hammed Animashaun – Black Ops (BBC One)	Freddie Meredith – Such Brave Girls (BBC Three); Jon Pointing – Big Boys (Channel 4)
Daytime Program	Scam Interceptors (BBC One)	Good Morning Britain - Matt Hancock Interview (ITV); Junior Bake Off (Channel 4)
Documentary Series	Once Upon a Time in Northern Ireland (BBC Two)	Evacuation (Channel 4); Kids (Channel 4)
Drama Series	Happy Valley (BBC One)	The Gold (BBC One & Paramount+); Top Boy (Netflix)
Entertainment	Squid Game: The Challenge (Netflix)	Michael McIntyre's The Wheel (BBC One); Strictly Come Dancing (BBC One)
Entertainment Performance	Hannah Waddingham – Eurovision Song Contest 2023 (BBC One)	Noel Fielding and Alison Hammond – The Great British Bake Off (Channel 4); Rob Beckett and Romesh Ranganathan - Rob & Romesh Vs. (Sky Max)
Formatted Popular Factual	Sort Your Life Out (BBC)	Banged Up (Channel 4); The Piano (Channel 4)
History	White Nanny, Black Child (Channel 5)	Britain's Human Zoos (Channel 4); The Man Who Played With Fire (Sky Documentaries)
Leading Actor: Female	Tamara Lawrance – Time (BBC One)	Jodie Whittaker – Time (BBC One); Sarah Lancashire – Happy Valley (BBC One)
Leading Actor: Male	Kane Robinson – Top Boy (Netflix)	Gary Oldman – Slow Horses (Apple TV+); Timothy Spall – The Sixth Commandment (BBC One)
Limited-Series	The Sixth Commandment (BBC One)	Best Interests (BBC One); Boiling Point (BBC One)
Live Event	Eurovision Song Contest 2023 (BBC One)	The Coronation Concert (BBC Studios Event Productions for BBC); The Coronation of TM The King and Queen Camilla (BBC)
Presenter	Chris Packham – Inside Our Autistic Minds (BBC)	Rhod Gilbert – Rhod Gilbert: A Pain in the Neck (Channel 4); Stacey Solomon – Sort Your Life Out (BBC)
Science & The Natural World	Chimp Empire (Netflix)	Inside Our Autistic Minds (BBC); Planet Earth III (BBC One)
Scripted Comedy	Extraordinary (Disney+)	Black Ops (BBC One); Such Brave Girls (BBC Three)
Single Documentary	Otto Baxter: Not A F***ing Horror Story (Sky Documentaries)	Anorexic (Channel 5); The Price of Truth (Channel 4)
Single Drama	Partygate (Channel 4)	Consent (Channel 4); Men Up (BBC One)
Soap and Continuing Drama	EastEnders (BBC One)	Casualty (BBC One); Waterloo Road (BBC iPlayer)
Sports Presenter, Commentator or Pundit	Alex Scott – FIFA Women's World Cup (BBC)	Gabby Logan – FIFA Women's World Cup (BBC); Nasser Hussain – The Ashes (Sky Sports Cricket)
Sports Program	All Ireland Senior Football Championship Final (BBC Northern Ireland)	2023 Rugby World Cup (ITV1 & ITV4); The Ashes (Sky Sports Cricket)
Supporting Actor – Female	Bella Ramsey – Time (BBC One)	Jasmine Jobson – Top Boy (Netflix); Ronke Adékoluẹjo - Rain Dogs (BBC One)
Supporting Actor – Male	Éanna Hardwicke – The Sixth Commandment (BBC One)	Araloyin Oshunremi – Top Boy (Netflix); Mark Gatiss – Nolly (ITVX)
Writer – Comedy	Jack Rooke – Big Boys (Channel 4)	Bridget Christie – The Change (Channel 4); Joe Tucker, Lloyd Woolf, Gbemisola Ikumelo & Akemnji Ndifornyen – Black Ops (BBC Studios Comedy Productions and Mondo Deluxe Productions for BBC)
Writer – Drama	Sarah Phelps – The Sixth Commandment (BBC One)	Emma Dennis-Edwards – Consent (Channel 4); Sally Wainwright – Happy Valley (BBC One)

2023 winners

This year saw the introduction of two new performance categories: supporting actor male and supporting actor female.

Presented: 28 March 2023 – Host: Tom Allen
Award	Winners	Nominees
Outstanding Achievement Award	Sarah Lancashire	–
Judges' Award	Charlotte Moore (BBC)	–
Arts	The Evolution of Black British Music (BET UK)	The Ghost of Richard Harris (Sky Arts); This Is Joan Collins (BBC)
Breakthrough Award	Lenny Rush – Am I Being Unreasonable? (BBC One)	Nicôle Lecky – Mood (BBC Three); Eddie Kadi – Sorry, I Didn't Know (ITV)
Children's Program	Dodger (CBBC)	COP27: Six Ways to Save Our Planet (Sky Kids / Sky News); Corpse Talk (YouTube Originals)
Comedy Drama	Brassic (Sky Max)	Am I Being Unreasonable? (BBC One); Cheaters (BBC Three)
Comedy Entertainment	Friday Night Live (Channel 4)	Joe Lycett vs David Beckham, A Got Your Back Special (Channel 4); Sorry, I Didn't Know (ITV)
Comedy Performance: Female	Daisy May Cooper as Nic in Am I Being Unreasonable? (BBC One)	Leah Brotherhead as Toni in Hullraisers (Channel 4); Rose Matafeo as Jessie in Starstruck (BBC One)
Comedy Performance: Male	Lenny Rush as Ollie in Am I Being Unreasonable? (BBC One)	Samson Kayo as Maleek in Bloods (Sky Comedy); Jon Pointing as Danny in Big Boys (Channel 4)
Daytime Program	Loose Men (ITV)	Come Dine With Me: The Professionals (Channel 4); Scam Interceptors (BBC One)
Documentary Series	Gazza (BBC Two)	Big Oil vs The World (BBC Two); Jeremy Kyle Show: Death On Daytime (Channel 4)
Drama Series	Sherwood (BBC One)	The Responder (BBC One); Top Boy (Netflix)
Entertainment	The Traitors (BBC One)	Joe Lycett’s Big Pride Party (Channel 4); The Lateish Show with Mo Gilligan (Channel 4)
Entertainment Performance	Claudia Winkleman – The Traitors (BBC One)	Jordan Stephens – Don't Hate The Playaz (ITV2); Mo Gilligan – The Lateish Show with Mo Gilligan (Channel 4)
Formatted Popular Factual	Gogglebox (Channel 4)	Idris Elba's Fight School (BBC Two); The Repair Shop: A Royal Visit (BBC One)
History	Our Falklands War: A frontline story (BBC Two)	Aids: The Unheard Tapes (BBC Two); Italia 90: Four Weeks that Changed the World (Sky Documentaries)
Leading Actor: Female	Kate Winslet as Ruth in I Am Ruth (Channel 4)	Billie Piper as Suzie Pickles in I Hate Suzie Too (Sky Atlantic); Monica Dolan as Anne Darwin in The Thief, His Wife and the Canoe (ITV)
Leading Actor: Male	Kit Connor as Nick Nelson in Heartstopper (Netflix)	Kane Robinson as Gerard "Sully" Sullivan in Top Boy (Netflix); Chaske Spencer as Sgt. Eli Whipp / Wounded Wolf in The English (BBC Two)
Limited-Series	Mood (BBC Three)	Anne (ITV); Chloe (BBC One)
Live Event	The State Funeral of HM The Queen Elizabeth II (BBC)	Glastonbury 2022 (BBC Two); Platinum Party at the Palace (BBC)
Presenter	Ramita Navai – Afghanistan: No Country for Women (ITV)	Huw Edwards – The State Funeral of HM The Queen Elizabeth II (BBC); Martin Lewis – The Martin Lewis Money Show Live (ITV)
Science & The Natural World	The Green Planet (BBC One)	My Dead Body (Channel 4); My Garden of a Thousand Bees (Sky Nature)
Scripted Comedy	Derry Girls (Channel 4)	Big Boys (Channel 4); Cunk On Earth (BBC Two / Netflix)
Single Documentary	The Tinder Swindler (Netflix)	Dying to Divorce (Sky Documentaries); Will Young: Losing My Twin Rupert (Channel 4)
Single Drama	Life and Death in the Warehouse (BBC Three)	The House (Netflix); Then Barbara Met Alan (BBC Two)
Soap and Continuing Drama	Casualty (BBC One)	EastEnders (BBC One); Hollyoaks (Channel 4)
Sports Presenter, Commentator or Pundit	Ade Adepitan – 2022 Winter Paralympics (Channel 4)	Gabby Logan – Women's EURO 2022 (BBC Sport); Roy Keane – FIFA World Cup 2022 (ITV Sport)
Sports Program	Birmingham 2022 Commonwealth Games (BBC Sport)	Winter Paralympics: "Today in Beijing" (Channel 4); Women's EURO 2022 (BBC Sport)
Supporting Actor – Female	Ambika Mod as Shruti Acharya in This Is Going to Hurt (BBC One)	Saffron Hocking as Lauryn Lawrence in Top Boy (Netflix); Adelayo Adedayo as Rachel Hargreaves in The Responder (BBC One)
Supporting Actor – Male	Adeel Akhtar as Andy Fisher in Sherwood (BBC One)	Stephen Walters as Steve Williams in Anne (ITV); Stephen Merchant as Stephen Port in Four Lives (BBC One)
Writer – Comedy	Lisa McGee for Derry Girls (Channel 4)	Jack Rooke for Big Boys (Channel 4); Sam Leifer and Tom Basden for Plebs: Soldiers of Rome (ITVX)
Writer – Drama	Lucy Prebble for I Hate Suzie Too (Sky Atlantic)	Sharon Horgan for Bad Sisters (Apple TV+); Will Smith for Slow Horses (Apple TV+)

2022 winners

This year saw the return to a live audience event after the lifting of COVID-19 restrictions. Comedian Graham Norton was presented the outstanding achievement award for 2020 which he had been unable to collect at that time due to having COVID-19.

Presented: 29 March 2022 – Host: Tom Allen
Award	Winners	Nominees
Outstanding Achievement Award 2020	Graham Norton (awarded retroactively)	–
Outstanding Achievement Award	Jack Thorne	–
Judges' Award	Strictly Come Dancing (BBC One)	–
Actor: Female	Gabrielle Creevy as Bethan in In My Skin (BBC Three)	Sharlene Whyte as Doreen Lawrence in Stephen (ITV); Keeley Hawes as Valerie Tozer in It's a Sin (Channel 4)
Actor: Male	Callum Scott Howells as Colin "Gladys Pugh" Morris-Jones in It's a Sin (Channel 4)	Tahar Rahim as Charles Sobhraj in The Serpent (BBC One); Olly Alexander as Ritchie Tozer in It's a Sin (Channel 4)
Arts	Lady Boss: The Jackie Collins Story (BBC)	African Apocalypse (BBC); Freddie Mercury: The Final Act (BBC Two)
Breakthrough Award	Adjani Salmon – Dreaming Whilst Black (BBC Three)	Callum Scott Howells – It's a Sin (Channel 4); Anjana Vasan – We Are Lady Parts (Channel 4)
Children's Programme	The Rubbish World of Dave Spud (CITV)	Newsround: "Let's Talk About Periods" (CBBC); The World According to Grandpa (Channel 5)
Comedy Entertainment	The Lateish Show with Mo Gilligan (Channel 4)	The Graham Norton Show (BBC One); The Last Leg (Channel 4)
Comedy Performance: Female	Anjana Vasan as Amina in We Are Lady Parts (Channel 4)	Sophie Willan as Alma Nuthall in Alma's Not Normal (BBC Two); Katy Wix as Carole Collins in Stath Lets Flats (Channel 4)
Comedy Performance: Male	Samson Kayo as Maleek in Bloods (Sky Comedy)	Nick Mohammed as Joseph Harries in Intelligence (Sky1); Adeel Akhtar as Billy in Back to Life (BBC One)
Daytime Programme	The Great House Giveaway (Channel 4)	Richard Osman's House of Games (BBC); Expert Witness (BBC One)
Documentary Series	9/11: One Day in America (National Geographic / Hulu)	Undercover Police: Hunting Paedophiles (Channel 4); Liverpool Narcos (Sky Documentaries)
Drama Series	In My Skin (BBC Three)	Manhunt The Night Stalker (ITV); Unforgotten (ITV)
Entertainment	The Big Breakfast (Channel 4)	Big Zuu's Big Eats (Dave); The Masked Singer (ITV)
Entertainment Performance	AJ Odudu and Mo Gilligan – The Big Breakfast (Channel 4)	Rosie Jones – Trip Hazard: My Great British Adventure (Channel 4); Victoria Coren Mitchell – Only Connect (BBC)
Formatted Popular Factual	The Dog House (Channel 4)	The Repair Shop (BBC Two); The Rap Game UK (BBC Three)
History	Uprising (BBC Two)	9/11: Life Under Attack (ITV); 9/11: Inside the President's War Room (BBC / Apple TV+)
Live Event	The Earthshot Prize 2021 (BBC)	The Funeral of HRH The Prince Philip, Duke of Edinburgh (BBC); YouTube Pride 2021 (YouTube Originals)
Limited Series	It's a Sin (Channel 4)	Stephen (ITV); Time (BBC One)
Presenter	Munya Chawawa – Race Around Britain (YouTube Originals)	Steph McGovern – Steph's Packed Lunch (Channel 4); Joe Lycett – Joe Lycett vs the Oil Giant (Channel 4)
RTS Network of the Year	BBC One	ITV; Sky Arts
Science & Natural History	David Harewood – Why is Covid Killing People of Colour? (BBC)	Horizon: "The Vaccine" (BBC Two); Baby Surgeons: Delivering Miracles (Channel 4)
Scripted Comedy	Alma's Not Normal (BBC Two)	Bloods (Sky Comedy); We Are Lady Parts (Channel 4)
Single Documentary	Rape: Who's on Trial? (Channel 4)	The Return: Life After ISIS (Sky Documentaries); Grenfell: The Untold Story (Channel 4)
Single Drama	Help (Channel 4)	Death of England: Face to Face (Sky Arts); Romeo and Juliet (Sky Arts)
Soap and Continuing Drama	Hollyoaks (Channel 4)	Casualty (BBC One); Coronation Street (ITV)
Sports Presenter, Commentator or Pundit	Gary Neville – Sky Sports Premier League (Sky Sports)	Emma Hayes – UEFA Euro 2020 (ITV); Gabby Logan – London Marathon (BBC Sport)
Sports Programme	Tokyo 2020 Olympics (BBC Sport)	The Hundred (Sky Sports); The Paralympics: Tokyo 2020 (Channel 4) Tokyo 2020 Olympics (BBC Sport)
Writer: Comedy	Nida Manzoor for We Are Lady Parts (Channel 4)	Mae Martin & Joe Hampson for Feel Good (Channel 4); Holly Walsh, Helen Serafinowicz and Barunka O'Shaughnessy for Motherland (BBC Two)
Writing: Drama	Russell T Davies for It's a Sin (Channel 4)	Richard Warlow for The Serpent (BBC One); Jack Thorne for Help (Channel 4)

2021 winners

For the second year running, due to COVID-19 related restrictions the 2021 winners ceremony was held behind closed doors and without a live audience. In 2021 a new award category for comedy entertainment programme was established. A special award was bestowed on John McVay, Sara Geater, Max Rumney, Hakan Kousetta and their team at PACT (Producers Alliance for Cinema and Television) in this year to recognise the difficulties and challenges for the independent production sector during the pandemic year.

Presented: 16 March 2021 (livestreamed event) – Host: Jonathan Ross
Award	Winners	Nominees
Outstanding Achievement Award	Russell T Davies	–
Judges' Award	Anne Mensah	–
Special Award	PACT (John McVay, Sara Geater, Max Rumney, Hakan Kousetta and team)	–
Actor: Female	Michaela Coel as Arabella Essiedu in I May Destroy You (BBC One)	Daisy Edgar-Jones as Marianne Sheridan in Normal People (BBC Three); Glenda Jackson as Maud Horsham in Elizabeth Is Missing (BBC One)
Actor: Male	Shaun Parkes as Frank Crichlow in Small Axe (BBC One)	Lennie James as Nelson "Nelly" Rowe in Save Me Too (Sky Atlantic); Paul Mescal as Connell Waldron in Normal People (BBC Three)
Arts	Grayson's Art Club (Channel 4)	African Renaissance: When Art Meets Power (BBC Four); Keith Haring: Street Art Boy (BBC Two)
Breakthrough Award	Mae Martin – Feel Good (Channel 4)	Big Zuu – Big Zuu's Big Eats (Dave); Robert Softley Gale – CripTales: "Hamish" (BBC Four)
Children's Programme	IRL with Team Charlene (CITV)	FYI Investigates: "Brazil: Children Caught in the Crossfire" (Sky Kids); JoJo & Gran Gran: "It's Time to Go to the Hairdresser's" (CBeebies)
Comedy Entertainment	The Ranganation (BBC Two)	Charlie Brooker's Antiviral Wipe (BBC Two); The Big Narstie Show (Channel 4)
Comedy Performance: Female	Gbemisola Ikumelo as various characters in Famalam (BBC Three)	Ruth Jones as Vanessa Shanessa "Nessa" Jenkins in Gavin & Stacey: "Christmas Special" (BBC One); Sophie Willan as Alma Nuthall in Alma's Not Normal (BBC Two)
Comedy Performance: Male	Youssef Kerkour as Sami Ibrahim in Home (Channel 4)	O. T. Fagbenle as Maxxx in Maxxx (Channel 4); Paul Chahidi as Rev. Francis Seaton in This Country (BBC Three)
Daytime Programme	Loose Women (ITV)	Junior Bake Off (Channel 4); The Bidding Room (BBC One)
Documentary Series	Once Upon a Time in Iraq (BBC Two)	Hospital: Fighting Covid-19 (BBC Two); The School That Tried to End Racism (Channel 4)
Drama Series	In My Skin (BBC Three)	I Hate Suzie (Sky Atlantic); Save Me Too (Sky Atlantic)
Entertainment	The Masked Singer (ITV)	Beat the Chasers (ITV); Big Zuu's Big Eats (Dave)
Entertainment Performance	Big Narstie & Mo Gilligan – The Big Narstie Show (Channel 4)	Rob Beckett & Romesh Ranganathan – Rob & Romesh Vs (Sky One); Yung Filly – Hot Property (BBC Three)
Formatted Popular Factual	Joe Lycett's Got Your Back (Channel 4)	Long Lost Family: Born Without Trace (ITV); The Rap Game UK (BBC Three)
History	Damilola: The Boy Next Door (Channel 4)	Lost Home Movies of Nazi Germany (BBC Four); The World's Biggest Murder Trial: Nuremberg (Channel 5)
Live Event	The Third Day: "Autumn" (Sky Atlantic / HBO)	ENO's Drive & Live: La Bohème (Sky Arts); Election 2019 Live: The Results (ITV)
Mini Series	I May Destroy You (BBC One)	Adult Material (Channel 4); Small Axe (BBC One)
Presenter	Joe Lycett – The Great British Sewing Bee (BBC One)	Grayson Perry – Grayson's Art Club (Channel 4); Yinka Bokinni – Damilola: The Boy Next Door (Channel 4)
RTS Channel of the Year	BBC One	ITV; Sky Arts
Science & Natural History	The Surgeon's Cut (Netflix)	Surviving the Virus: My Brother & Me (BBC One); Brain Surgeons: Between Life and Death (Channel 4)
Scripted Comedy	The Young Offenders (BBC Three / RTÉ)	Brassic (Sky1); Sex Education (Netflix)
Single Documentary	Anton Ferdinand: Football, Racism & Me (BBC One)	Surviving Covid (Channel 4); The Family Secret (Channel 4)
Single Drama	Elizabeth Is Missing (BBC One)	Anthony (BBC One); Sitting in Limbo (BBC One)
Soap and Continuing Drama	Casualty (BBC One)	Coronation Street (ITV); Holby City (BBC One)
Sports Presenter, Commentator or Pundit	Michael Holding – England v West Indies (Sky Sports)	Bryan Habana – 2019 Rugby World Cup Final (ITV Sport); Gabby Logan – London Marathon 2020 (BBC Sport)
Sports Programme	England v West Indies First Test: "Black Lives Matter" (Sky Sports)	London Marathon 2020 (BBC One); The Open For The Ages (Sky Sports)
Writer: Comedy	Mae Martin and Joe Hampson for Feel Good (Channel 4)	Peter Foott for The Young Offenders (BBC Three / RTÉ); Writing team for Ghosts (BBC One)
Writing: Drama	Michaela Coel for I May Destroy You (BBC One)	Lucy Prebble for I Hate Suzie (Sky Atlantic); Steve McQueen and Alastair Siddons for Small Axe (BBC One)

2020 winners

Due to COVID-19 related restrictions the 2020 winners ceremony was held behind closed doors and without a live audience. The outstanding achievement award was not awarded as comedian Graham Norton had COVID-19, (it would be retroactively awarded in 2022 once the ceremony returned as a live audience event).

Presented: 17 March 2020 (livestreamed event) – Host: Paul Merton
Award	Winners	Nominees
Outstanding Achievement Award	Graham Norton (not awarded)	–
Judges' Award	Jane Featherstone	–
Actor: Female	Tamara Lawrance as July in The Long Song (BBC One)	Niamh Algar as Dinah in The Virtues (Channel 4); Suranne Jones as Anne Lister in Gentleman Jack (BBC One)
Actor: Male	Stephen Graham as Joseph in The Virtues (Channel 4)	Jared Harris as Valery Legasov in Chernobyl (Sky Atlantic / HBO); Micheal Ward as Jamie Tovell in Top Boy (Netflix)
Arts	Bros: After the Screaming Stops (BBC Four)	Imagine: "James Graham - In the Room Where It Happens" (BBC One); Superkids: Breaking Away From Care (Channel 4)
Breakthrough Award	Tanya Moodie – Motherland (BBC Two)	Aisling Bea – This Way Up (Channel 4); Tim Renkow – Jerk (BBC Three)
Children's Programme	Zog (BBC One)	The Athena (Sky Kids); Step Up to the Plate (CBBC)
Comedy Performance: Female	Saoirse-Monica Jackson as Erin Quinn in Derry Girls (Channel 4)	Diane Morgan as Liz in Motherland (BBC Two); Phoebe Waller-Bridge as Fleabag in Fleabag (BBC One)
Comedy Performance: Male	Ncuti Gatwa as Eric Effiong in Sex Education (Netflix)	Alex Murphy as Conor MacSweeney and Chris Walley as Jock O'Keeffe in The Young Offenders (BBC Three / RTÉ); Youssef Kerkour as Sami Ibrahim in Home (Channel 4)
Daytime Programme	The Repair Shop (BBC Two)	Beat the Chef (Channel 4); Good Morning Britain (ITV)
Documentary Series	The Choir: Our School By The Tower (BBC Two)	Crime and Punishment (Channel 4); Hometown: A Killing (BBC Three)
Drama Series	Gentleman Jack (BBC One)	Ackley Bridge (Channel 4); The Capture (BBC One)
Entertainment	RuPaul's Drag Race UK (BBC Three)	Britain's Got Talent (ITV); Love Island (ITV2)
Entertainment Performance	London Hughes – Don't Hate The Playaz (ITV2)	Mo Gilligan – The Lateish Show with Mo Gilligan (Channel 4); Stephen Mulhern – In for a Penny (ITV)
Formatted Popular Factual	The British Tribe Next Door (Channel 4)	Celebrity Gogglebox (Channel 4); The Circle (Channel 4)
History	Jade: The Reality Star Who Changed Britain (Channel 4)	Spotlight on The Troubles: A Secret History (BBC One Northern Ireland); The Last Survivors (BBC One)
Live Event	Stormzy at Glastonbury 2019 (BBC Two)	The BRIT Awards 2019 (ITV); The Royal British Legion Festival of Remembrance (BBC One)
Mini Series	The Long Song (BBC One)	Chernobyl (Sky Atlantic / HBO); Years and Years (BBC One)
Presenter	Mobeen Azhar – Hometown: A Killing (BBC Three)	Fred Brathwaite – A Fresh Guide to Florence (BBC Two); Vicky McClure – Our Dementia Choir with Vicky McClure (BBC One)
RTS Channel of the Year	Channel 5	BBC Three; Sky Atlantic
Science & Natural History	The Parkinson's Drug Trial: A Miracle Cure? (BBC Two)	8 Days: To the Moon and Back (BBC Two); The Planets (BBC Two)
Scripted Comedy	Fleabag (BBC One)	Derry Girls (Channel 4); Stath Lets Flats (Channel 4)
Single Documentary	War in the Blood (BBC Two)	David Harewood: Psychosis and Me (BBC Two); Undercover: Inside China's Digital Gulag (ITV)
Single Drama	The Left Behind (BBC Three / BBC Wales)	Brexit: The Uncivil War (Channel 4); Doing Money (BBC Two)
Soap and Continuing Drama	Casualty (BBC One)	EastEnders (BBC One); Coronation Street (ITV)
Sports Presenter, Commentator or Pundit	Alex Scott – 2019 FIFA Women's World Cup (BBC One)	Gareth Thomas – 2019 Rugby World Cup (ITV Sport); Nasser Hussain – The Ashes (Sky Sports)
Sports Programme	ICC Cricket World Cup Final (Sky Sports)	2019 Rugby World Cup (ITV sport); FIFA Women's World Cup 2019: "Semi Final: England v USA" (BBC One)
Writer: Comedy	Phoebe Waller-Bridge for Fleabag (BBC One)	Danny Brocklehurst for Brassic (Sky1); Laurie Nunn for Sex Education (Netflix)
Writing: Drama	Craig Mazin for Chernobyl (Sky Atlantic / HBO)	Neil Forsyth for Guilt (BBC Two); Roy Williams for Soon Gone: A Windrush Chronicle (BBC Four)

2019 winners

In 2019 the comedy performance award was split into two (male and female) for the first time.

Presented: 19 March 2019 – Host: Shappi Khorsandi
Award	Winners	Nominees
Outstanding Achievement Award	Lorraine Kelly	–
Judges' Award	Ben Frow	–
Actor: Female	Jodie Comer as Oksana Astankova / Villanelle in Killing Eve (BBC Three)	Michaela Coel as Kate Ashby in Black Earth Rising (BBC Two); Sandra Oh as Eve Polastri in Killing Eve (BBC Three)
Actor: Male	Lucian Msamati as Tobi Akindele Kiri (Channel 4)	Ben Whishaw as Norman Josiffe / Norman Scott in A Very English Scandal (BBC One); Lennie James as Nelson "Nelly" Rowe in Save Me (Sky Atlantic)
Arts	The Art of Drumming (Sky Arts)	Black Hollywood: "They've Gotta Have Us" (BBC Two); Germaine Bloody Greer (BBC Two)
Breakthrough Award	Nabhaan Rizwan – Informer (BBC One)	Alice Feetham – Save Me (Sky Atlantic); Mo Gilligan – The Big Narstie Show (Channel 4)
Children's Programme	Prosiect Z (S4C)	Jacqueline Wilson's Katy (CBBC); My Life: "Locked in Boy" (CBBC)
Comedy Performance: Female	Lesley Manville as Cathy Walker in Mum (BBC Two)	Daisy May Cooper as Kerry Mucklowe in This Country (BBC Three); Sian Gibson as Kayleigh Kitson in Peter Kay's Car Share: "The Finale" (BBC One)
Comedy Performance: Male	Steve Pemberton and Reece Shearsmith as various characters in Inside No. 9 (BBC Two)	Alex Murphy as Conor MacSweeney and Chris Walley as Jock O'Keeffe in The Young Offenders (BBC Three / RTÉ); Samson Kayo as various characters in Famalam (BBC Three)
Daytime Programme	The Repair Shop (BBC Two)	Moving On: "Invisible" (BBC One); Murder, Mystery and My Family (BBC One)
Documentary Series	Prison (Channel 4)	Drugsland (BBC Three); Love and Hate Crime (BBC One)
Drama Series	Save Me (Sky Atlantic)	Killing Eve (BBC Three); Peaky Blinders (BBC Two)
Entertainment	The Last Leg (Channel 4)	Britain's Got Talent (ITV); Don't Hate The Playaz (ITV2)
Entertainment Performance	Big Narstie & Mo Gilligan – The Big Narstie Show (Channel 4)	Jennifer Hudson – The Voice UK (ITV); Michael McIntyre – Michael McIntyre's Big Show (BBC One)
Formatted Popular Factual	The Real Full Monty: Ladies Night (ITV)	Gordon, Gino and Fred: Road Trip: "The French Connection" (ITV); Mortimer & Whitehouse: Gone Fishing (BBC Two)
History	A Dangerous Dynasty: The House of Assad (BBC Two)	Secret History: "Holocaust – The Revenge Plot" (Channel 4); The Ruth Ellis Files: A Very British Crime Story (BBC Four)
Live Event	The Royal Wedding: Prince Harry and Meghan Markle (BBC)	Glyndebourne Opera Cup (Sky Arts); The Real Full Monty Live (ITV)
Mini Series	A Very English Scandal (BBC One)	Butterfly (ITV); The Cry (BBC One)
Presenter	Romesh Ranganathan – The Misadventures of Romesh Ranganathan (BBC Two)	Bobby Friction – Pump Up the Bhangra: The Sound of Asian Britain (BBC Four); Michael Palin – Michael Palin in North Korea (Channel 5)
RTS Channel of the Year	CBeebies	BBC One; Channel 5
Science & Natural History	Drowning in Plastic (BBC One)	Blue Planet II (BBC One); The Secret Life of Landfill: A Rubbish History (BBC Four)
Scripted Comedy	Derry Girls (Channel 4)	Famalam (BBC Three); Detectorists (BBC Four)
Single Documentary	Raped: My Story (Channel 5)	Grenfell (BBC One); Married to a Paedophile (Channel 4)
Single Drama	Killed by My Debt (BBC Three)	Black Mirror: "USS Callister" (Netflix); Mother's Day (BBC Two)
Soap and Continuing Drama	Hollyoaks (Channel 4)	Casualty (BBC One); Coronation Street (ITV)
Sports Presenter, Commentator or Pundit	Osi Umenyiora – The NFL Show/NFL This Week (BBC Two)	Gary Lineker – MOTD: "World Cup 2018" (BBC One); Roy Keane – 2018 FIFA World Cup (ITV)
Sports Programme	MOTD: "2018 World Cup - Quarter Final – England v Sweden" (BBC One)	2018 Ryder Cup (Sky Sports); Winter Paralympic Games (Channel 4)
Writer: Comedy	Stefan Golaszewski for Mum (BBC Two)	Jamie Demetriou and Robert Popper for Stath Lets Flats (Channel 4); Lisa McGee for Derry Girls (Channel 4)
Writing: Drama	Lennie James for Save Me (Sky Atlantic)	David Nicholls for Patrick Melrose (Sky Atlantic); Russell T Davies for A Very English Scandal (BBC One)

2018 winners

In 2018 Netflix's historical drama The Crown was bestowed a special recognition award.

Presented: 20 March 2018 – Host: Vernon Kay
Award	Winners	Nominees
Lifetime Achievement Award	Jimmy McGovern	–
Judges' Award	Charlie Brooker and Annabel Jones	–
Special Recognition Award	The Crown (Netflix)	–
Actor: Female	Sinéad Keenan as Melanie Jones in Little Boy Blue (ITV)	Thandie Newton as Roz Huntley in Line of Duty (BBC Two); Wunmi Mosaku as Gloria Taylor in Damilola, Our Loved Boy (BBC One)
Actor: Male	Stephen Graham as Detective Superintendent Dave Kelly in Little Boy Blue (ITV)	Jack Rowan as Sam Woodford in Born To Kill (Channel 4); Sean Bean as Father Michael Kerrigan in Broken (BBC One)
Arts	Paula Rego, Secrets & Stories (BBC Two)	Basquiat: Rage to Riches (BBC Two); Grayson Perry: Divided Britain (Channel 4)
Breakthrough Award	Daniel Lawrence Taylor – Timewasters (ITV2)	Daisy May Cooper and Charlie Cooper for This Country (BBC Three); Molly Windsor – Three Girls (BBC One)
Children's Programme	Newsround: "Inside My Head" (CBBC)	Apple Tree House: "Talking Books" (CBeebies); Jamie Johnson: "End Game" (CBBC)
Comedy Performance	Daisy May Cooper as Kerry Mucklowe and Charlie Cooper as Lee "Kurtan" Mucklowe in This Country (BBC Three)	Michaela Coel as Tracey Gordon in Chewing Gum (E4); Tom Davis as DI Sleet in Murder in Successville (BBC Three)
Daytime Programme	Moving On: "Eighteen" (BBC One)	Good Morning Britain (ITV); The Question Jury (Channel 4)
Documentary Series	Hospital (BBC Two)	Catching a Killer (Channel 4); The Detectives: "Murder on the Streets" (BBC Two)
Drama Series	The End of the F***ing World (Channel 4 / Netflix)	Ackley Bridge (Channel 4); The Crown (Netflix)
Entertainment	Love Island (ITV2)	Ant & Dec's Saturday Night Takeaway (ITV); Murder in Successville (BBC Three)
Entertainment Performance	Adam Hills, Alex Brooker and Josh Widdicombe – The Last Leg (Channel 4)	Ant & Dec – I'm a Celebrity... Get Me Out of Here! (ITV); Claudia Winkleman – Strictly Come Dancing (BBC One)
Formatted Popular Factual	Muslims Like Us (BBC One)	Rich House Poor House (Channel 5); The Big Life Fix with Simon Reeve (BBC Two)
History	Elizabeth I's Secret Agents (BBC Two)	Black and British: A Forgotten History (BBC Two); My Family, Partition and Me: India 1947 (BBC One)
Live Event	World War One Remembered: Passchendaele – For The Fallen (BBC Two)	One Love Manchester (BBC One); ITV News: "Election Night: The Results" (ITV)
Mini Series	Three Girls (BBC One)	Born To Kill (Channel 4); The State (Channel 4)
Presenter	Anita Rani – My Family, Partition and Me: India 1947 (BBC One)	Grayson Perry – Grayson Perry: Divided Britain (Channel 4); Gordon Ramsay – Gordon Ramsay on Cocaine (ITV)
RTS Channel of the Year	BBC One	CBBC; Channel 5
Science & Natural History	Planet Earth II	Dogs: An Amazing Animal Family (Sky1); Guy Martin vs The Robot Car (Channel 4)
Scripted Comedy	This Country (BBC Three)	Chewing Gum (E4); People Just Do Nothing (BBC Three)
Single Documentary	Rio Ferdinand: Being Mum and Dad (BBC One)	Chris Packham: Aspergers and Me (BBC One); The Accused (Channel 5)
Single Drama	Murdered for Being Different (BBC Three)	Damilola, Our Loved Boy (BBC One); King Charles III (BBC Two)
Soap and Continuing Drama	Coronation Street (ITV)	EastEnders (BBC One); Holby City (BBC One)
Sports Presenter, Commentator or Pundit	Michael Johnson – World Athletics Championships (BBC Sport)	Kelly Cates – Friday Night Football (STV); Osi Umenyiora – The NFL Show/NFL This Week (BBC Two)
Sports Programme	Anthony Joshua vs. Wladimir Klitschko (Sky Sports)	2017 FA Cup Final (BBC Sport); UEFA Women's EURO: "England v Netherlands Semi-Final" (Channel 4)
Writer: Comedy	Daisy May Cooper and Charlie Cooper for This Country (BBC Three)	Michaela Coel for Chewing Gum (E4); Steve Stamp and Allan Mustafa for People Just Do Nothing (BBC Three)
Writing: Drama	Nicole Taylor for Three Girls (BBC One)	Charlie Covell for The End of the F***ing World (Channel 4 / Netflix); Jeff Pope for Little Boy Blue (ITV)

2017 winners

This year saw the drama serial award retired to make way for two new awards: the mini-series award and the RTS channel of the year award.

Presented: 21 March 2017 – Host: Sandy Toksvig
Award	Winners	Nominees
Lifetime Achievement Award	Julie Walters	–
Judges' Award	Sally Wainwright	–
Actor: Female	Sophie Okonedo as Maya Cobbina in Undercover (BBC One)	Jodie Comer as Ivy Moxam in Thirteen (BBC Three); Julie Walters as Marie Finchley in National Treasure (Channel 4)
Actor: Male	Robbie Coltrane as Paul Finchley in National Treasure (Channel 4)	Adeel Akhtar as Shahzad in Murdered by My Father (BBC One); James Nesbitt as Colin Howell in The Secret (ITV)
Arts	Grayson Perry: All Man (Channel 4)	Bricks! (BBC Four); One Night in 2012: An Imagine Special (BBC One)
Breakthrough Award	Phoebe Waller-Bridge – Fleabag (BBC Three)	Nadiya Hussain – The Chronicles of Nadiya (BBC One); Phillip Wood – Chasing Dad: A Lifelong Addiction (BBC Three)
Children's Programme	CBeebies A Midsummer Night's Dream (CBeebies)	Lily's Driftwood Bay (Nick Jr.); My Life: "The Boy on the Bicycle" (CBBC)
Comedy Performance	Asim Chaudhry as Chabud "Chabuddy G" Gul in People Just Do Nothing (BBC Three)	Sharon Horgan as Sharon Morris and Rob Delaney as Rob Norris in Catastrophe (Channel 4); Steve Coogan as Alan Partridge in Alan Partridge's Scissored Isle (Sky Atlantic)
Daytime Programme	Find it, Fix it, Flog it (Channel 4)	Matron, Medicine and Me: 70 Years of the NHS (BBC One); The Question Jury (Channel 4)
Documentary Series	Exodus: Our Journey to Europe (BBC Two)	Inside Obama's White House (BBC Two / AL Jazeer America / Arte France); The Murder Detectives (Channel 4)
Drama Series	Happy Valley (BBC One)	Line of Duty (BBC Two); The Durrells (ITV)
Entertainment	Ant & Dec's Saturday Night Takeaway (ITV)	Strictly Come Dancing (BBC One); Taskmaster (Dave)
Entertainment Performance	Adam Hills, Alex Brooker and Josh Widdicombe – The Last Leg (Channel 4)	Ant & Dec – I'm a Celebrity... Get Me Out of Here! (ITV); Romesh Ranganathan – Asian Provocateur: Mum's American Dream (BBC Three)
History	The Aberfan Young Wives' Club (ITV)	Secret History: "Saddam Goes to Hollywood" (Channel 4); Challenger Disaster: Lost Tapes (National Geographic)
Live Event	Stand Up to Cancer (Channel 4)	The Centenary of the Battle of the Somme (BBC One / BBC Two); The Sound of Music Live! (ITV)
Mini Series	National Treasure (Channel 4)	London Spy (BBC Two); Thirteen (BBC Three)
Popular Factual and Features	Employable Me (BBC Two)	First Dates (Channel 4); SAS: Who Dares Wins (Channel 4)
Presenter	Grayson Perry – Grayson Perry: All Man (Channel 4)	Sir David Attenborough – Attenborough and The Giant Dinosaur (BBC One); Richard Ayoade – Travel Man: "48 Hours in Vienna" (Channel 4)
RTS Channel of the Year	BBC Three	BBC One; Channel 4
Science & Natural History	First Contact: Lost Tribe of the Amazon (Channel 4)	The Hunt: "The Hardest Challenge" (BBC One); The Secret Life of 4, 5 & 6 Year Olds (Channel 4)
Scripted Comedy	People Just Do Nothing (BBC Three)	Catastrophe (Channel 4); The Windsors (Channel 4)
Single Documentary	The Murder of Sadie Hartley (ITV)	Hillsborough (BBC Two); The Forgotten Children (ITV)
Single Drama	Murdered by My Father (BBC One)	A Midsummer Night's Dream (BBC One); Reg (BBC One)
Soap and Continuing Drama	Emmerdale (ITV)	EastEnders (BBC One); Hollyoaks (Channel 4)
Sports Presenter, Commentator or Pundit	Osi Umenyiora – Race to Super Bowl 50, The NFL Show/NFL This Week (BBC Two)	Clare Balding – Rio Paralympics (Channel 4); Nasser Hussain (Sky Sports)
Sports Programme	Rio Paralympics (Channel 4)	Twenty20 International: "England v Pakistan" (Sky Sports); The Open (Sky Sports)
Writer: Comedy	Phoebe Waller-Bridge for Fleabag (BBC Three)	Graham Linehan, Sharon Horgan, Helen Serafinowicz, Holly Walsh for Motherland (BBC Two); Stefan Golaszewski for Mum (BBC Two)
Writing: Drama	Sally Wainwright for Happy Valley (BBC One)	Jack Thorne for National Treasure (Channel 4); Jed Mercurio for Line of Duty (BBC Two)

2016 winners

In 2016 a single breakthrough award was revived to replace the two awards (behind the scenes and on-screen) that were last bestowed in 2008. The children's fiction award was retired as was the international award.

Presented: 22 March 2016 – Host: Richard Madeley
Award	Winners	Nominees
Lifetime Achievement Award	Joan Bakewell	–
Judges' Award	Lenny Henry	–
Actor: Female	Suranne Jones as Dr. Gemma Foster in Doctor Foster (BBC One)	Claire Foy as Anne Boleyn in Wolf Hall (BBC Two); Claire Rushbrook as Pat Simms in Home Fires (ITV)
Actor: Male	Anthony Hopkins as "Sir" in The Dresser (BBC Two)	Adam Long as Tom in Don't Take My Baby (BBC Three); Tom Courtenay as Eric Slater in Unforgotten (ITV)
Arts	Handmade (BBC Four)	Grayson Perry's Dream House (Channel 4); Hockney (BBC Two)
Breakthrough Award	Michaela Coel – Chewing Gum (E4)	Richard Bentley – The Stranger on the Bridge (Channel 4); Sian Gibson – Peter Kay's Car Share (BBC One)
Children's Programme	My Life: "I Am Leo" (CBBC)	Lily's Driftwood Bay: "Goodbye Seabird" (Nick Jr.); The Dumping Ground (CBBC)
Comedy Performance	Michaela Coel as Tracey Gordon in Chewing Gum (E4)	Nick Helm as Andy King in Uncle (BBC One); Sharon Horgan as Sharon Morris and Rob Delaney as Rob Norris in Catastrophe (Channel 4)
Daytime Programme	Judge Rinder (ITV)	Posh Pawnbrokers (Channel 4); This Morning (ITV)
Documentary Series	The Romanians are Coming (Channel 4)	Reggie Yates' Extreme Russia (BBC Three); The Detectives (BBC Two)
Drama Serial	The Lost Honour of Christopher Jefferies (ITV)	Wolf Hall (BBC Two); This Is England '90 (Channel 4)
Drama Series	No Offence (Channel 4)	Humans (Channel 4; The Last Kingdom (BBC Two)
Entertainment	Release the Hounds (ITV2)	The Graham Norton Show (BBC One); The Last Leg (Channel 4)
Entertainment Performance	Ant & Dec – I'm a Celebrity... Get Me Out of Here! / Britain's Got Talent / Ant & Dec's Saturday Night Takeaway (ITV)	Adam Hills – The Last Leg (Channel 4); Jack Whitehall – A League of Their Own (Sky1)
History	Holocaust: Night Will Fall (Channel 4)	Britain's Forgotten Slave Owners (BBC Two); Dagrau o Waed: Rhyfel Corea/Tears of Blood: Korean War (S4C)
Live Event	VE Day 70: The Nation Remembers (BBC One)	Alternative General Election with Jeremy Paxman (Channel 4); BRIT Awards 2015 (ITV)
Popular, Factual and Features	DIY SOS: "Homes For Veterans" (BBC One)	First Dates (Channel 4); SAS: Who Dares Wins (Channel 4)
Presenter	Reggie Yates – Reggie Yates' Extreme Russia (BBC Three)	David Olusoga – Britain's Forgotten Slave Owners (BBC Two); Grayson Perry – Grayson Perry's Dream House (Channel 4)
Science & Natural History	Oak Tree: Nature's Greatest Survivor (BBC Four)	Big Blue Live (BBC Two); Japan: Earth's Enchanted Islands (BBC Two)
Scripted Comedy	Catastrophe (Channel 4)	Peter Kay's Car Share (BBC One); People Just Do Nothing (BBC Three)
Single Documentary	Storyville: "India's Daughter" (BBC Four)	Going Clear: Scientology and the Prison of Belief (Sky Atlantic); My Son the Jihadi (Channel 4)
Single Drama	Coalition (Channel 4)	Black Mirror: "White Christmas" (Channel 4); Cyberbully (Channel 4)
Soap and Continuing Drama	Emmerdale (ITV)	Coronation Street (ITV); EastEnders (BBC One)
Sports Presenter, Commentator or Pundit	David Coulthard (BBC Sport)	Alan Shearer (BBC Sport); Gary Neville – Monday Night Football (Sky Sports)
Sports Programme	Monday Night Football (Sky Sports)	Champions League Goals Show (BT Sport); The Ashes (Sky Sports)
Writer: Comedy	Rob Delaney and Sharon Horgan for Catastrophe (Channel 4)	Michaela Coel for Chewing Gum (E4); Peter Kay, Sian Gibson, Paul Coleman and Tim Reid for Peter Kay's Car Share (BBC One)
Writing: Drama	Peter Morgan for The Lost Honour of Christopher Jefferies (ITV)	Russell T Davies for Cucumber (Channel 4); Shane Meadows and Jack Thorne for This Is England '90 (Channel 4)

2015 winners

Presented: 17 March 2015 – Host: John Sargeant
Award	Winners	Nominees
Lifetime Achievement Award	Melvyn Bragg	–
Judges' Award	Ben Stephenson	–
Actor: Female	Sarah Lancashire as Sgt Catherine Cawood in Happy Valley (BBC One)	Georgina Campbell as Ashley Jones in Murdered by My Boyfriend (BBC Three); Sheridan Smith as Cilla Black in Cilla (ITV)
Actor: Male	Tom Hollander as Dylan Thomas in A Poet in New York (BBC Two)	Adeel Akhtar as Wilson Wilson inUtopia (Channel 4); Toby Jones as Neil Baldwin in Marvellous (BBC Two)
Arts	Grayson Perry: Who Are You? (Channel 4)	Messiah at the Foundling Hospital (BBC Two); Our Gay Wedding: The Musical (Channel 4)
Children's Fiction	4 O'Clock Club: "Christmas" (CBBC)	Hank Zipzer (CBBC); Katie Morag: "Katie Morag and the Tiresome Ted" (CBeebies)
Children's Programme	The Big Performance: "Finale" (CBBC)	Marrying Mum and Dad (CBBC); Swashbuckle: "Pirate Pampering" (Cbeebies)
Comedy Performance	Reece Shearsmith and Steve Pemberton as various characters in Inside No. 9 (BBC Two)	Harry Enfield as various characters in Harry & Paul's Story of the Twos (BBC Two); Sarah Hadland as Trish Collingwood in The Job Lot (ITV2)
Daytime Programme	Couples Come Dine with Me (Channel 4)	Superstar Dogs (Channel 4); This Morning (ITV)
Documentary Series	Life and Death Row (BBC Three)	Bedlam (Channel 4); Protecting Our Parents (BBC Two)
Drama Serial	The Honourable Woman (BBC Two)	Prey (ITV); The Driver (BBC One)
Drama Series	Line of Duty (BBC Two)	Happy Valley (BBC One); Peaky Blinders (BBC Two)
Entertainment	The Graham Norton Show (BBC One)	A League of Their Own (Sky1); Ant & Dec's Saturday Night Takeaway (ITV)
Entertainment Performance	Claudia Winkleman – Strictly Come Dancing (BBC One)	Graham Norton – The Graham Norton Show (BBC One); Keith Lemon – Celebrity Juice (ITV2)
History	Our World War (BBC Three)	The First Georgians: The German Kings Who Made Britain (BBC Four); The World's War: Forgotten Soldiers of Empire (BBC Two)
International	Fargo (Channel 4)	The Big Bang Theory (E4); True Detective (Sky Atlantic)
Live Event	D-Day: The Heroes Return (BBC One)	The Grand National (Channel 4 Racing); WW1 Remembered – From The Battlefield & From Westminster Abbey (BBC Two)
Popular Factual and Features	The Island with Bear Grylls (Channel 4)	50 Ways To Kill Your Mammy (Sky1); The Great British Bake Off (BBC One)
Presenter	Billy Connolly – Billy Connolly's Big Send Off (ITV)	Lucy Worsley – The First Georgians: The German Kings Who Made Britain (BBC Four); Grayson Perry – Grayson Perry: Who Are You? (Channel 4)
Science & Natural History	Live From Space: Lap of the Planet (Channel 4)	Life Story (BBC One); The Girl Who Talked to Dolphins (BBC Four)
Scripted Comedy	Harry & Paul's Story of the Twos (BBC Two)	Him & Her: The Wedding (BBC Three); Moone Boy (Sky One)
Single Documentary	The Paedophile Hunter (Channel 4)	Baby P: The Untold Story (BBC One); This World: "Terror at The Mall" (BBC Two)
Single Drama	Murdered by My Boyfriend (BBC Three)	Common (BBC One); Marvellous (BBC Two)
Soap and Continuing Drama	Casualty (BBC One)	Coronation Street (ITV); EastEnders (BBC One)
Sports Presenter, Commentator or Pundit	Gary Neville (Sky Sports)	Gary Lineker (BBC Sport); Hazel Irvine (BBC Sport)
Sports Programme	The 2014 Ryder Cup (Sky Sports)	British Grand Prix (BBC Two); World Cup: "Germany vs Brazil" (BBC One)
Writer: Comedy	Harry Enfield, Paul Whitehouse and Charlie Higson for Harry & Paul's Story of the Twos (BBC Two)	Jessica Knappett for Drifters (E4); Sam Leifer and Tom Basden for Plebs (ITV2)
Writing: Drama	Peter Bowker for Marvellous (BBC Two)	Jimmy McGovern for Common (BBC One); Sally Wainwright for Happy Valley (BBC One)

2014 winners

In 2014 the nations & regions programme award was dropped to make room for two sports-related awards; sports programme and sports presenter, commentator or pundit.

Presented: 18 March 2014 – Host: Tim Vine
Award	Winners	Nominees
Lifetime Achievement Award	David Suchet	–
Judges' Award	Janice Hadlow	–
Actor: Female	Olivia Colman as DR Ellie Miller in Broadchurch (ITV) / as Carol in Run (Channel 4)	Jodie Whittaker as Beth Latimer in Broadchurch (ITV); Sharon Rooney as Rachel "Rae" Earl in My Mad Fat Diary (E4)
Actor: Male	Idris Elba as DCI John Luther in Luther (BBC One)	Lennie James as Richard in Run (Channel 4); Stephen Dillane as Det. Chief Inspector Karl Roebuck in The Tunnel (Sky Atlantic)
Arts	Imagine: "Vivian Maier: Who Took Nanny's Pictures?" (BBC One)	Inside the Mind of Leonardo (Sky Arts); Rebuilding The World Trade Center (Channel 4)
Children's Fiction	The Dumping Ground (CBBC)	The Ugly Duckling (CBeebies); Wolfblood (CBBC)
Children's Programme	Newsround: "Hard Times" (CBBC)	Absolute Genius with Dick and Dom (CBBC); Swashbuckle (Cbeebies)
Comedy Performance	Brendan O'Carroll as Agnes Brown in Mrs. Brown's Boys (BBC One)	Rebecca Front as the Therapist in Psychobitches (Sky Arts); Ryan Sampson as Grumio in Plebs (ITV2)
Daytime Programme	Four Rooms (Channel 4 / More4)	Pointless (BBC One); The Chase (ITV)
Documentary Series	Educating Yorkshire (Channel 4)	Her Majesty's Prison: Aylesbury (ITV); The Call Centre (BBC Three)
Drama Serial	Broadchurch (ITV)	In the Flesh (BBC Three); Top of the Lake (BBC Two)
Drama Series	Peaky Blinders (BBC Two)	My Mad Fat Diary (E4); Utopia (Channel 4)
Entertainment	The Last Leg (Channel 4)	A League of Their Own (Sky1); Ant & Dec's Saturday Night Takeaway (ITV)
Entertainment Performance	Alan Carr – Alan Carr: Chatty Man (Channel 4)	Leigh Francis – Celebrity Juice (ITV2) / Through the Keyhole (ITV); Ant & Dec – Britain's Got Talent / Ant & Dec's Saturday Night Takeaway (ITV)
History	Richard III: King in the Car Park (Channel 4)	Secrets From The Workhouse (ITV); The Story of the Jews (BBC Two)
International	Game of Thrones (Sky Atlantic)	Storyville: "Pussy Riot: A Punk Prayer" (BBC Four); The Returned (More4)
Live Event	The Ashes – 2013 (Sky Sports)	Bollywood Carmen Live (BBC Three); Wimbledon: "Men's Final" (BBC Sport)
Popular Factual and Features	Gogglebox (Channel 4)	Gadget Man (Channel 4); Long Lost Family (ITV)
Presenter	Stephen Fry – Stephen Fry: Out There (BBC Two)	David Attenborough – Galapagos 3D (Sky 3D); Davina McCall – Long Lost Family (ITV)
Science & Natural History	Africa (BBC One)	How To Win The Grand National (Channel 4); Planet Ant: Life Inside the Colony (BBC Four)
Scripted Comedy	Plebs (ITV2)	A Touch of Cloth: "Undercover Cloth" (Sky1); Toast of London (Channel 4)
Single Documentary	The Murder Trial (Channel 4)	Dogging Tales (Channel 4); The Unspeakable Crime: Rape (BBC One)
Single Drama	The Challenger (BBC Two)	Burton & Taylor (BBC Four); Our Girl (BBC One)
Soap and Continuing Drama	Coronation Street (ITV)	Casualty (BBC One); Emmerdale (ITV)
Sports Presenter, Commentator or Pundit	Gary Neville (Sky Sports)	Clare Balding – Channel 4 Racing (Channel 4); Gabby Logan – World Athletics (BBC Sport)
Sports Programme	World Athletics: "Mo Farah's Double Gold Win (BBC Sport)	Andy Murray: The Man Behind the Racquet (BBC One); FA Cup Final (ITV Sport)
Writer: Comedy	James Corden, Mathew Baynton and Tom Basden for The Wrong Mans (BBC Two)	Sam Leifer and Tom Basden for Plebs (ITV2); Writing team for Psychobitches (Sky Arts)
Writing: Drama	Marlon Smith and Daniel Fajemisin-Duncan for Run (Channel 4)	Chris Chibnall for Broadchurch (ITV); Dennis Kelly for Utopia (Channel 4)

2013 winners

In 2013 the award for live event was revived having been lasted bestowed in 2004. This year was also notable for the RTS television awards in that two judges' awards were bestowed for the very first time.

Presented: 19 March 2013 – Host: Jo Brand
Award	Winners	Nominees
Lifetime Achievement Award	Dave Gordon (Head of sporting events: BBC)	–
Judges' Award	Danny Boyle	–
Judges' Award	London Paralympics 2012 (Channel 4)	–
Actor: Female	Olivia Colman as Sue in Accused (BBC One)	Anne-Marie Duff as Mo Murray in Accused (BBC One); Sheridan Smith as Charmian Biggs in Mrs Biggs (ITV)
Actor: Male	Sean Bean as Simon / Tracie in Accused (BBC One)	Lennie James as Tony Gates in Line of Duty (BBC Two); Oliver Lansley as Kenny Everett in Best Possible Taste: The Kenny Everett Story (BBC One)
Arts	Lucian Freud: Painted Life (BBC Two)	All in the Best Possible Taste with Grayson Perry (Channel 4); The South Bank Show: "Grime, Bow & How UK Hip Hop Found Its Voice" (Sky Arts)
Children's Drama	Wolfblood (CBBC)	Mr Stink (BBC One); Teulu Tŷ Crwn (The 'Tŷ Crwn' Family) (S4C)
Children's Programme	Room on the Broom (BBC One)	Newsround: "Up and Away" (CBBC); Horrible Histories (CBBC)
Comedy Performance	Jessica Hynes as Siobhan Sharpe in Twenty Twelve (BBC Two)	Jack Whitehall as Jonathan "J.P." Pembersley in Fresh Meat (Channel 4); Ruth Jones as Stella Jackson / Morris / Kosh in Stella (Sky One)
Daytime Programme	Remembrance Week (BBC One)	Jamie's 15-Minute Meals (Channel 4); The Chase (ITV)
Documentary Series	Protecting Our Children (BBC Two)	Our War (BBC Three); The Year the Town Hall Shrank (BBC Four)
Drama Serial	Good Cop (BBC One)	Parade's End (BBC Two); Room at the Top (BBC Four)
Drama Series	Sherlock (BBC One)	Call the Midwife (BBC One); Line of Duty (BBC Two)
Entertainment	Celebrity Juice (ITV2)	Britain's Got Talent (ITV); Dynamo: Magician Impossible (Watch)
Entertainment Performance	Ant & Dec – I'm a Celebrity... Get Me Out of Here! (ITV)	Charlie Brooker – 10 O'Clock Live (Channel 4); will.i.am – The Voice UK (BBC One)
History	The Secret History of Our Streets (BBC Two)	The Plot To Bring Down Britain's Planes (Channel 4); Words of Captain Scott (ITV)
International	Girls (Sky Atlantic)	Borgen (BBC Four); Homeland (Channel 4)
Live Event	The London Olympics 2012 (BBC Sport)	The London Paralympics 2012 (Channel 4); The Queen's Diamond Jubilee Concert (BBC One)
Nations and Regions Programme	The Bank of Dave: "Episode 1" (Channel 4)	Born to Lose (STV); The Story of Wales (BBC One Wales)
Popular Factual and Features	Long Lost Family (ITV)	Make Bradford British (Channel 4); The Great British Bake Off (BBC Two)
Presenter	Clare Balding – The Olympics (BBC)	Dr James Fox – History of Art in Three Colours (BBC Four); Grayson Perry – All in the Best Possible Taste with Grayson Perry (Channel 4)
Science & Natural History	Operation Iceberg (BBC Two)	Earthflight (BBC One); The Plane Crash (Channel 4)
Scripted Comedy	Alan Partridge: Welcome to the Places of My Life (Sky Atlantic)	Fresh Meat (Channel 4); Twenty Twelve (BBC Two)
Single Documentary	7/7: One Day in London (BBC Two)	Fy Chwaer A Fi / My Sister and Me (S4C); Lifers (Channel 4)
Single Drama	The Hollow Crown: "Richard II" (BBC Two)	Everyday (Channel 4); My Murder (BBC Three)
Soap and Continuing Drama	Coronation Street (ITV)	EastEnders (BBC One); Hollyoaks (Channel 4)
Writer: Comedy	Writing Team for The Thick of It (BBC Two)	Jo Brand, Vicki Pepperdine and Joanna Scanlan for Getting On (BBC Four); John Morton for Twenty Twelve (BBC Two)
Writing: Drama	Steven Moffat for Sherlock (BBC One)	Jed Mercurio for Line of Duty (BBC Two); Robert Jones for Murder (BBC Two)

2012 winners

Presented: 20 March 2012 – Host: Rob Brydon
Award	Winners	Nominees
Lifetime Achievement Award	Beryl Vertue	–
Judges' Award	Laura Mackie (Director of drama: ITV)	–
Actor: Female	Emily Watson as Janet Leach in Appropriate Adult (ITV)	Ruth Negga as Shirley Bassey in Shirley (BBC Two); Vicky McClure as Frances Lorraine "Lol" Jenkins in This Is England '88 (Channel 4)
Actor: Male	Dominic West as Fred West in Appropriate Adult (ITV)	Daniel Rigby as Eric Morecambe in Eric and Ernie (BBC Two); John Simm as Tom Ronstadt in Exile (BBC One)
Arts	Graffiti Wars (Channel 4)	Arena: Produced by George Martin (BBC Two); The Impressionists (BBC Two)
Children's Drama	The Story of Tracy Beaker (CBBC)	The Sarah Jane Adventures (CBBC)
Children's Programme	Newsround: "My Autism & Me" (CBBC)	Horrible Histories (CBBC); The Amazing World of Gumball: "The Quest" (Cartoon Network)
Comedy Performance	Russell Tovey as Steve Marshall and Sarah Solemani as Becky Williams in Him & Her (BBC Three)	Darren Boyd as Tim Elliot in Spy (Sky1); Tom Hollander as Adam Smallbone in Rev. (BBC Two)
Daytime Programme	Deal or No Deal (Channel 4)	Antiques Road Trip (BBC Two); Operation Hospital Food with James Martin (BBC One)
Documentary Series	24 Hours in A&E (Channel 4)	Educating Essex (Channel 4); Fighting on the Frontline (Channel 4)
Drama Serial	Top Boy (Channel 4)	The Crimson Petal and the White (BBC Two); The Promise (Channel 4)
Drama Series	Luther (BBC One)	Scott & Bailey (ITV); The Fades (BBC Three)
Entertainment	Derren Brown: The Experiments (Channel 4)	The Million Pound Drop (Channel 4); The Graham Norton Show (BBC One)
Entertainment Performance	Ant & Dec – I'm a Celebrity... Get Me Out of Here! / Red or Black? / Push the Button / Britain's Got Talent (ITV)	James Corden – A League of Their Own (Sky1); Keith Lemon – Celebrity Juice (ITV2)
History	Dambusters: Building The Bouncing Bomb (Channel 4)	If Walls Could Talk – The History of the Home (BBC Four); The Life of Muhammad (BBC Two)
International	Modern Family (Sky1)	The Killing (BBC Four); The Slap (BBC Four)
Nations and Regions Programme	The Scheme (BBC One Scotland)	Frankenstein's Wedding...Live in Leeds (BBC Three); Wil a Cêt (S4C)
Popular Factual and Features	Hugh's Big Fish Fight (Channel 4)	An Idiot Abroad 2 (Sky1); The Great British Bake Off (BBC Two)
Presenter	Gareth Malone – The Choir: Military Wives (BBC Two)	Hugh Fearnley-Whittingstall – Hugh's Big Fish Fight (Channel 4); Karl Pilkington – An Idiot Abroad 2 (Sky1)
Science & Natural History	Mummifying Alan: Egypt's Last Secret (Channel 4)	Frozen Planet (BBC One); Stargazing Live (BBC Two)
Scripted Comedy	Fresh Meat (Channel 4)	PhoneShop (Channel 4); Rev. (BBC Two)
Single Documentary	Terry Pratchett: Choosing to Die	The Life and Loss of Karen Woo (ITV); True Stories: "Hell and Back Again" (Channel 4)
Single Drama	Eric and Ernie (BBC Two)	Random (Channel 4); United (BBC Two)
Soap and Continuing Drama	Coronation Street (ITV)	EastEnders (BBC One); Emmerdale (ITV)
Writer: Comedy	Sam Bain and Jesse Armstrong for Fresh Meat (Channel 4)	James Wood for Rev. (BBC Two); Robert Popper for Friday Night Dinner (Channel 4)
Writing: Drama	Peter Bowker for Eric and Ernie (BBC Two)	Neil McKay for Appropriate Adult (ITV); Steven Moffat for Doctor Who (BBC One)

2011 winners

2011 saw a reversal of the 2009 decision with two documentary categories reinstated and the constructed factual series award removed along with the multi-channel programme award.

Presented: 15 March 2011 – Host: Dara Ó Briain
Award	Winners	Nominees
Lifetime Achievement Award	Peter Bennett-Jones	–
Judges' Award	Steven Moffat	–
Actor: Female	Vicky McClure as Frances Lorraine "Lol" Jenkins in This Is England '86 (Channel 4)	Julie Walters as Mo Mowlam in Mo (Channel 4); Natalie Press as Paula Clennell in Five Daughters (BBC One)
Actor: Male	Jim Broadbent as Logan Mountstuart in Any Human Heart (Channel 4)	David Tennant as Dave Tiler in Single Father (BBC One); Johnny Harris as Michael "Mick" Jenkins in This Is England '86 (Channel 4)
Arts	Alan Bennett and the Habit of Art (More4)	Alan Bennett and the Habit of Art (More4); Genius of British Art: "Howard Jacobson 'Flesh'" (Channel 4)
Children's Drama	The Sarah Jane Adventures (CBBC)	The Story of Tracy Beaker (CBBC)
Children's Programme	Horrible Histories (CBBC)	Something Special (CBeebies); Diwrnod Mawr – Sion Pyrs (My Big Day – Sion Pyrs) (S4C)
Comedy Performance	Miranda Hart as Miranda in Miranda (BBC One)	James Buckley as Jay Cartwright in The Inbetweeners (E4); Tom Hollander for Adam Smallbone in Rev. (BBC Two)
Daytime / Early-peak Programme	The Indian Doctor (BBC One)	Deal or No Deal (Channel 4); Moving On: "Sauce for the Goose" (BBC One)
Documentary Series	Welcome to Lagos (BBC Two)	One Born Every Minute (Channel 4); Wormwood Scrubs (ITV)
Drama Serial	Five Daughters (BBC One)	Any Human Heart (Channel 4); This Is England '86 (Channel 4)
Drama Series	Sherlock (BBC One)	Downton Abbey (ITV); Misfits (E4)
Entertainment	The X Factor (ITV)	The Cube (ITV); The Million Pound Drop (Channel 4)
Entertainment Performance	Ant & Dec – I'm a Celebrity... Get Me Out of Here! / Britain's Got Talent (ITV)	Charlie Brooker – Newswipe with Charlie Brooker (BBC Four); Graham Norton – The Graham Norton Show (BBC One)
Features and Lifestyle Series	Pineapple Dance Studios (Sky1)	Don't Tell the Bride (BBC Three); The Great British Bake Off (BBC Two)
History	The Secret Life of the National Grid (BBC Four)	At Home with the Georgians (BBC Two); Words of the Blitz (ITV)
International	True Stories: "The Cove" (Channel 4)	Justified (5USA); Mad Men (BBC Four)
Nations and Regions Programme	Breaking the Silence (BBC One Northern Ireland)	Snowdonia 1890 (BBC One Wales); Taggart (STV)
Presenter	Brian Cox – Wonders of the Solar System (BBC Two)	Piers Morgan – Piers Morgan's Life Stories (ITV); Reggie Yates – Autistic Superstars (BBC Three)
Science & Natural History	Wonders of the Solar System (BBC Two)	How Earth Made Us: "Deep Earth" (BBC Two); Lost Land of the Tiger (BBC One)
Scripted Comedy	Miranda (BBC One)	Rev. (BBC Two); The Inbetweeners (E4)
Single Documentary	Between Life and Death (BBC One)	My Big Fat Gypsy Wedding (Channel 4); The Dancing Boys of Afghanistan (More4)
Single Drama	The Road to Coronation Street (BBC Four)	Mo (Channel 4); The Song of Lunch (BBC Two)
Soap and Continuing Drama	EastEnders (BBC One)	Casualty (BBC One); Coronation Street (ITV)
Writer: Comedy	Jo Brand, Vicki Pepperdine and Joanna Scanlan for Getting On (BBC Four)	Graham Linehan for The IT Crowd (Channel 4); Sam Bain and Jesse Armstrong for Peep Show (Channel 4)
Writing: Drama	Jack Thorne and Shane Meadows for This Is England '86 (Channel 4)	Neil McKay for Mo (Channel 4); Stephen Butchard for Five Daughters (BBC One)

2010 winners

Presented: 16 March 2010 – Host: Rob Brydon
Award	Winners	Nominees
Lifetime Achievement Award	Tony Warren	–
Judges' Award	Norma Percy	–
Actor: Female	Naomie Harris as Hortense Roberts in Small Island (BBC One)	Julie Walters as Dr Anne Turner in A Short Stay in Switzerland (BBC One); Suranne Jones as Ruth Slater in Unforgiven (ITV)
Actor: Male	David Oyelowo as Gilbert Joseph in Small Island (BBC One)	Stephen Graham as Shay Ryan in The Street (BBC One); Tom Hardy as Freddie Jackson Jr. in The Take (Sky1)
Arts	Baroque! (BBC Four)	The First Movie (More4); What is Beauty? (BBC Two)
Children's Drama	Roy (CBBC)	M.I. High (CBBC); The Sarah Jane Adventures (CBBC)
Children's Programme	Big & Small: "Blame it on the Drain" (Cbeebies)	Bookaboo (CITV); Horrible Histories (CBBC)
Comedy Performance	Miranda Hart as Miranda in Miranda (BBC Two)	Peter Capaldi as Malcolm Tucker in The Thick of It (BBC Two); Ruth Jones as Vanessa Shanessa "Nessa" Jenkins in Gavin & Stacey (BBC One)
Constructed Factual Series	Famous, Rich and Homeless (BBC One)	The World's Strictest Parents (BBC Three); Victorian Farm (BBC Two)
Daytime / Early-peak Programme	Come Dine with Me (Channel 4)	Coach Trip (Channel 4); The Hairy Bikers' Food Tour of Britain (BBC Two)
Documentary	Wounded (BBC One)	True Stories: "Afghan Star" (More4); The Force (Channel 4)
Drama Serial	Unforgiven (ITV)	Occupation (BBC One); Red Riding (Channel 4)
Drama Series	The Street (BBC One)	Cast Offs (Channel 4); Misfits (E4)
Entertainment	Newswipe with Charlie Brooker (BBC Four)	Britain's Got Talent (ITV); The X Factor (ITV)
Entertainment Performance	Harry Hill – Harry Hill's TV Burp (ITV)	Ant & Dec – I'm a Celebrity... Get Me Out of Here! / Britain's Got Talent (ITV); Michael McIntyre – Michael McIntyre's Comedy Roadshow (BBC One)
Features and Lifestyle Series	Heston's Feasts: "Heston's Victorian Feast" (Channel 4)	Don't Tell the Bride (BBC Three); The Sex Education Show vs Pornography (Channel 4)
History	Garrow's Law (BBC One)	1066 The Battle for Middle Earth (Channel 4); Iran and the West (BBC Two)
International	Mad Men (BBC Four)	Damages (BBC One); Generation Kill (FX)
Multi-Channel Programme Award	Dating in the Dark (Living)	True Stories: "Here's Johnny" (More 4); Micro Men (BBC Four)
Nations and Regions Programme	A History of Scotland (BBC One Scotland)	Deep Wreck Mysteries: Death of a Battleship (UTV); Shameless (Channel 4)
Presenter	Louis Theroux – A Place for Paedophiles (BBC Two)	James May – James May's Toy Stories (BBC Two); Piers Morgan – Piers Morgan's Life Stories (ITV)
Science & Natural History	Inside Nature's Giants (Channel 4)	The Great Sperm Race (Channel 4); Yellowstone: "Winter" (BBC Two)
Scripted Comedy	The Thick of It (BBC Two)	Miranda (BBC Two); The Inbetweeners (E4)
Single Drama	Five Minutes of Heaven (BBC Two)	A Short Stay in Switzerland (BBC One); Endgame (Channel 4)
Soap and Continuing Drama	EastEnders (BBC One)	Casualty (BBC One); The Bill (ITV)
Writer: Comedy	Iain Morris and Damon Beesley for The Inbetweeners (E4)	Jo Brand, Joanna Scanlan and Vicki Pepperdine for Getting On (BBC Four); Miranda Hart, James Cary and Richard Hurst for Miranda (BBC Two)
Writing: Drama	Peter Bowker for Occupation (BBC One)	Guy Hibbert for Five Minutes of Heaven (BBC Two); Howard Overman for Misfits (E4)

2009 winners

In 2009 the two separate awards for documentaries were merged to make room for an award for constructed factual series, created to recognise the growth and popularity of the reality TV series genre.

Presented: 17 March 2009 – Host: Rory Bremner
Award	Winners	Nominees
Lifetime Achievement Award	Bruce Forsyth	–
Judges' Award	Richard Holloway	–
Actor: Female	Andrea Riseborough as Angelica Fanshawe in The Devil's Whore (Channel 4)	Anna Maxwell Martin as N in Poppy Shakespeare (Channel 4); Claire Foy as Amy Dorrit "Little Dorrit" in Little Dorrit (BBC One)
Actor: Male	Ben Whishaw as Ben Coulter in Criminal Justice (BBC One)	Matthew Macfadyen as Arthur Clennam in Little Dorrit (BBC One); Rafe Spall as Frank Taylor in He Kills Coppers (ITV)
Arts	Arena: "The Agony and The Ecstasy of Phil Spector" (BBC Two)	True Stories: "Derek" (More4); The Mona Lisa Curse (Channel 4)
Children's Drama	M.I. High (CBBC)	The Sarah Jane Adventures (CBBC); Summerhill (CBBC)
Children's Programme	ABC (S4C)	Get Squiggling (BBC Two); Lifeproof (Channel 4)
Comedy Performance	Peter Kay as Geraldine McQueen in Britain's Got the Pop Factor... (Channel 4)	James Corden as Neil "Smithy" Smith in Gavin & Stacey (BBC One); Simon Bird as Will McKenzie in The Inbetweeners (E4)
Constructed Factual Series	The Choir: Boys Don't Sing (BBC Two)	Banged Up (Channel 5); Britain's Missing Top Model (BBC Three)
Daytime / Early-peak Programme	The Estate We're In (BBC One)	MasterChef: The Professionals (BBC One); Missing (BBC One)
Digital Channel Programme	Charlie Brooker's Screenwipe (BBC Four)	Katy Brand's Big Ass Show (ITV2); Stanley Kubrick's Boxes (More4)
Documentary	The Fallen (BBC Two)	True Stories: "Chosen" (More4); Cutting Edge: "A Boy Called Alex" (Channel 4)
Drama Serial	The Devil's Whore (Channel 4)	Criminal Justice (BBC One); A Place of Execution (ITV)
Drama Series	The Fixer (ITV)	City of Vice (Channel 4); Con Passionate (S4C)
Entertainment	Harry Hill's TV Burp (ITV)	Strictly Come Dancing (BBC One); The X Factor (ITV)
Entertainment Performance	Alan Carr and Justin Lee Collins – The Sunday Night Project (Channel 4)	Harry Hill – Harry Hill's TV Burp (ITV); Paul O'Grady – The Paul O'Grady Show (ITV)
Features and Lifestyle Series	How to Look Good Naked (Channel 4)	Kevin McCloud and The Big Town Plan (Channel 4); Mary Queen of Shops (BBC Two)
History	Victorian Sex Explorer (Channel 4)	The American Future: A History (BBC Two); Black Power Salute (bbc fOUR)
International	Mad Men (BBC Four)	Summer Heights High (More4); The Daily Show with Jon Stewart (BBC Three)
Nations and Regions Programme	A Poem for Harry (BBC West)	Carefree (Channel M); High Times (STV)
Presenter	Bruce Parry – Amazon with Bruce Parry (BBC Two)	Mary Portas – Mary Queen of Shops (BBC Two); Phillip Schofield and Fern Britton – This Morning (ITV)
Science & Natural History	Lost Land of the Jaguar (BBC One)	Life in Cold Blood (BBC One); The Genius of Charles Darwin (BBC One)
Scripted Comedy	Outnumbered (BBC One)	Lead Balloon (BBC Two); Peep Show (Channel 4)
Single Drama	The Curse of Steptoe (BBC Four)	Margaret Thatcher: The Long Walk to Finchley (BBC Four); The Shooting of Thomas Hurndall (Channel 4)
Soap and Continuing Drama	EastEnders (BBC One)	Coronation Street (ITV); The Bill (ITV)
Writer: Comedy	Sam Bain and Jesse Armstrong for Peep Show (Channel 4)	Graham Linehan for The IT Crowd (Channel 4); Sharon Horgan and Dennis Kelly for Pulling (BBC Three)
Writing: Drama	Peter Flannery for The Devil's Whore (Channel 4)	Peter Moffat for Criminal Justice (BBC One); Simon Block for The Shooting of Thomas Hurndall (Channel 4)

2008 winners

In 2008 the RTS Gold Medal was superseded by the lifetime achievement award. The two breakthrough awards (behind the scenes and on-screen) were retired in this year as was the award for nations & regions presenter.

Presented: 19 March 2008 – Host: Eamonn Holmes
Award	Winners	Nominees
Lifetime Achievement Award	Sir David Attenborough	–
Judges' Award	Glenwyn Benson	–
Actor: Female	Sally Hawkins as Anne Elliot in Persuasion (ITV)	Janet McTeer as DS Amy Foster in Five Days (BBC One); Penelope Wilton as Barbara Wilton in Five Days (BBC One)
Actor: Male	Matthew Macfadyen as Charlie in Secret Life (Channel 4)	Andrew Garfield as Jack Burridge in Boy A (Channel 4); David Tennant (Recovery / as the Doctor in Doctor Who (BBC One)
Arts	Genius of Photography (BBC Four)	How We Built Britain (BBC One) This is Civilisation (Channel 4)
Children's Drama	My Life as a Popat (CITV)	Desperados (CBBC); The Sarah Jane Adventures (CBBC)
Children's Programme	Serious Andes (CBBC)	Pocoyo (CITV); Shaun the Sheep (BBC One)
Comedy Performance	David Mitchell as Mark Corrigan / Robert Webb as Jeremy "Jez" Usborne in Peep Show (Channel 4)	Jack Dee as Rick Spleen in Lead Balloon (BBC Two); Peter Capaldi as Malcolm Tucker in The Thick of It (BBC Four)
Daytime Programme	Come Dine with Me (Channel 4)	Loose Women (ITV); Wanted Down Under (BBC One)
Digital Channel Programme	Fonejacker (E4)	Charlie Brooker's Screenwipe (BBC Four); The Trial of Tony Blair ()
Drama Serial	Britz (Channel 4)	Five Days (BBC One); Torn (ITV)
Drama Series	The Street (BBC One)	Doctor Who (BBC One); Skins (E4)
Entertainment	QI (BBC Two)	Strictly Come Dancing (BBC One); The Armstrong & Miller Show (BBC One)
Entertainment Performance	Harry Hill – Harry Hill's TV Burp (ITV)	Ant & Dec – I'm a Celebrity... Get Me Out of Here! / Ant & Dec's Saturday Night Takeaway (ITV); Stephen Fry – QI (BBC Two)
Features and Lifestyle Series	Top Gear (BBC Two)	Gordon Ramsay's F Word (Channel 4); How to Look Good Naked (Channel 4)
Formatted Documentary	Meet the Natives (Channel 4)	Filthy Rich and Homeless (BBC Three); The Secret Millionaire (Channel 4)
History	Andrew Marr's History of Modern Britain (BBC Two)	A Very British Sex Scandal (Channel 4); The Relief of Belsen (Channel 4)
International	Flight of the Conchords (BBC Four)	Heroes (Sci Fi); Ugly Betty (Channel 4)
Nations and Regions Programme	Boys Behind Bars (BBC Scotland)	The Bullseye Belles (BBC Northern Ireland); Routemaster: Goodbye London, Hello World (ITV London)
Observational Documentary	You're Not Splitting Up My Family (Channel 4)	Beautiful Young Minds (BBC Two); Panorama: "Taking on the Taliban – The Soldiers' Story" (BBC One)
Presenter	Andrew Marr – Andrew Marr's History of Modern Britain (BBC Two)	Kevin McCloud – Grand Designs (Channel 4); Stephen Nolan – Nolan Live (BBC Northern Ireland)
Science & Natural History	Parallel Worlds, Parallel Lives (BBC Four)	Horizon: "Everest – Doctors in the Death Zone" (BBC Two); The Human Footprint (Channel 4)
Single Drama	Stuart: A Life Backwards (BBC Two)	Boy A (Channel 4); The Mark of Cain (Channel 4)
Situation Comedy and Comedy Drama	The Mighty Boosh (BBC Three)	Peep Show (Channel 4); The Thick of It (BBC Four)
Soap and Continuing Drama	The Bill (ITV)	Coronation Street (ITV); Holby City (BBC One)
Writer: Comedy	Graham Linehan for The IT Crowd (Channel 4)	Sam Bain and Jesse Armstrong for Peep Show (Channel 4); Armando Iannucci, Simon Blackwell, Jesse Armstrong, Tony Roche and Ian Martin for The Thick of It (BBC Four)
Writing: Drama	Heidi Thomas for Cranford (BBC One)	Gwyneth Hughes for Five Days (BBC One); Mark O'Rowe for Boy A (Channel 4)

2007 winners

Presented: 14 March 2007 – Host: Mark Austin
Award	Winners	Nominees
RTS Gold Medal	Clive Jones (MD: ITV network)	–
Judges' Award	Richard Curtis	–
Actor: Female	Helen Mirren as DCI Jane Tennison in Prime Suspect (ITV)	Julia Davis as Fanny Cradock in Fear of Fanny (BBC Four); Susan Lynch as Penny in Soundproof (BBC Two)
Actor: Male	Michael Sheen as Kenneth Williams in Kenneth Williams: Fantabulosa! (BBC Four)	Jim Broadbent as Lord Longford in Longford (Channel 4); Philip Glenister as Gene Hunt in Life on Mars (BBC One)
Arts	9/11: Out of the Blue (Channel 5)	Peter & the Wolf (Channel 4); Simon Schama's Power of Art: "Bernini" (BBC Two)
Breakthrough Award – Behind the Scenes	Lee Mack and Andrew Collins – Not Going Out (BBC One)	Bart Layton – Banged Up Abroad (Channel 4); Lisa Gilchrist – See No Evil: The Moors Murders (ITV)
Breakthrough Award – On Screen	Sacha Dhawan as Karim in Bradford Riots (Channel 4)	Joseph Mawle as Dean Whittingham in Soundproof (BBC Two); Russell Brand – Russell Brand's Got Issues (E4)
Children's Drama	Young Dracula (CBBC)	Jackanory: "Muddle Earth" (CBBC); That Summer Day (CBBC)
Children's Programme	Newsround: "The Wrong Trainers" (CBBC)	Charlie and Lola: "Welcome to Lolaland" (CBeebies); Evacuation (CBBC)
Comedy Performance	Stephen Merchant as Darren Lamb in Extras (BBC Two)	Catherine Tate as various characters in The Catherine Tate Show (BBC Two); Kevin Bishop as various roles in Star Stories (Channel 4)
Daytime Programme	Through Hell and High Water (BBC One)	The New Paul O'Grady Show (ITV); This Morning (ITV)
Documentary Series	Anatomy of a Crime (BBC Two)	Cult of the Suicide Bomber II (Channel 4); Stephen Fry: The Secret Life of the Manic Depressive (BBC Two)
Digital Channel Programme	Death of a President (More4)	Charlie Brooker's Screenwipe (BBC Four); Manchester Passion (BBC Three)
Drama Serial	Low Winter Sun (Channel 4)	Prime Suspect (ITV); Terry Pratchett's Hogfather (Sky1)
Drama Series	The Street (BBC One)	Doctor Who (BBC One); Life on Mars (BBC One)
Entertainment	How Do You Solve a Problem like Maria? (BBC One)	Friday Night Project (Channel 4); I'm a Celebrity... Get Me Out of Here! (ITV)
Entertainment Performance	Simon Amstell – Never Mind the Buzzcocks (BBC Two)	Harry Hill – Harry Hill's TV Burp (ITV); Justin Lee Collins and Alan Carr – Friday Night Project (Channel 4)
Features and Factual Entertainment	The Apprentice (BBC Two)	Dragons' Den (BBC Two); The Real Hustle (BBC Three)
History	Who Do You Think You Are? (BBC One)	Nuremberg: Nazis on Trial (BBC Two); The War of the World (Channel 4)
International	Entourage (ITV2)	Baghdad ER (More4); Spiral (BBC Four)
Nations and Regions Presenter	Jim McColl – The Beechgrove Garden (BBC One)	Darryl Grimason – Supergoose / Secret Gardens / Earthworks / Waterworld (BBC Northern Ireland); Fearghal McKinney (UTV)
Nations and Regions Programme	Inside Out: "Iceman" (BBC Yorkshire)	Holloway Hairdo (ITV London); Life's Too Short (BBC Scotland)
Presenter	Bruce Parry – Tribe (BBC Two)	Gordon Ramsay – Gordon Ramsay's F Word (Channel 4); Jeremy Clarkson, James May & Richard Hammond – Top Gear (BBC Two)
Science & Natural History	Planet Earth: "From Pole to Pole" (BBC One)	Horizon: "Bye Bye Planet Pluto" (BBC Two); How William Shatner Changed the World (Five)
Single Documentary	True Stories: "Sisters in Law" (More4)	Rain in My Heart (BBC Two); 9/11: The Falling Man (Channel 4)
Single Drama	Housewife, 49 (ITV)	Longford (Channel 4); The Road to Guantánamo (Channel 4)
Situation Comedy and Comedy Drama	The Royle Family: "The Queen of Sheba" (BBC Two)	Extras (BBC Two); Green Wing (Channel 4)
Soap and Continuing Drama	Coronation Street (ITV)	Emmerdale (ITV); The Bill (ITV)
Writer: Comedy	Caroline Aherne, Craig Cash and Phil Mealey for The Royle Family (BBC Two)	Sharon Horgan and Dennis Kelly for Pulling (BBC Three); Victoria Pile & Team for Green Wing (Channel 4)
Writing: Drama	Peter Morgan for Longford (Channel 4)	Abi Morgan for Tsunami: The Aftermath (HBO / BBC Two); Simon Donald for Low Winter Sun (Channel 4)

2006 winners (Programme Awards 2005)

In 2006 the two newcomer awards (behind the scenes and on-screen) were each renamed as the breakthrough awards. No RTS Gold Medal recipient is recorded for this year.

Presented: 14 March 2006 – Host: Phillip Schofield
Award	Winners	Nominees
Judges' Award	Jon Plowman	–
Actor: Female	Lesley Sharp as Alison Mundy in Afterlife (ITV)	Anne-Marie Duff as Fiona McBride in Shameless (Channel 4); Julie Walters as Marie, Lady Stubbs in Ahead of the Class (ITV)
Actor: Male	David Threlfall as Frank Gallagher in Shameless (Channel 4) / & The Queen's Sister)	Charles Dance as Mr. Tulkinghorn in Bleak House (BBC One); Martin Clunes as Martin Ellingham in Doc Martin (ITV)
Arts	Holocaust: A Music Memorial Film from Auschwitz (BBC Two)	A Picture of Britain: "The Mystical West" (BBC One); DV8 – The Cost of Living (Channel 4)
Breakthrough Award – Behind the Scenes	Jonathan Smith – Only Human: "Make Me Normal" (Channel 4)	Finn McGough – Country Strife (BBC Three); Justin Chadwick – Bleak House (BBC One)
Breakthrough Award – On Screen	Phil Beadle – The Unteachables (Channel 4)	Bruce Parry – Tribe (BBC Two); Zoë Tapper as Jenny Maple in Twenty Thousand Streets Under the Sky (BBC Four)
Children's Drama	My Parents Are Aliens (CITV)	Last Rights (Channel 4); The Story of Tracy Beaker (CBBC)
Children's Programme	Serious Arctic (CBBC)	Charlie and Lola: "I Am Not Sleepy and I Will Not Go to Bed" (Cbeebies); Sticks and Stones (Channel 4)
Comedy Performance	Catherine Tate as various characters in The Catherine Tate Show (BBC Two)	David Walliams and Matt Lucas – Little Britain (BBC One); Peter Capaldi as Malcolm Tucker in The Thick of It (BBC Four)
Daytime Programme	Deal or No Deal (Channel 4)	Beaten (BBC One); Coach Trip (Channel 4)
Documentary Series	Jamie's School Dinners (Channel 4)	Cocaine (Channel 4); Tribe (BBC Two)
Digital Channel Programme	Brainiac (Sky One)	The House of Tiny Tearaways (BBC Three); The Match (Sky One)
Drama Serial	Bleak House (BBC One)	Elizabeth I (Channel 4); To the Ends of the Earth (BBC Two)
Drama Series	Bodies (BBC Three)	Doctor Who (BBC One); Shameless (Channel 4)
Entertainment	The Catherine Tate Show (BBC Two)	I'm a Celebrity... Get Me Out of Here! (ITV); The X Factor (ITV)
Entertainment Performance	Paul O'Grady – The Paul O'Grady Show (ITV)	Ant & Dec – Ant & Dec's Saturday Night Takeaway (ITV); Derren Brown – Derren Brown: Tricks of the Mind (Channel 4)
Features and Factual Entertainment	Springwatch with Bill Oddie (BBC Two)	Dragons' Den (BBC Two); Rock School (Channel 4)
History	Trafalgar Battle Surgeon (Channel 4)	Israel and the Arabs: Elusive Peace (BBC Two); Trafalgar Battle Surgeon (Channel 4)
International	Weeds (Sky One)	Desperate Housewives (Channel 4); Lost (Channel 4)
Nations and Regions Presenter	Stephen Nolan – Nolan Live (BBC Northern Ireland)	Carol Malia (BBC Look North); Emily Maitlis – BBC London News (BBC One)
Nations and Regions Programme	From Belfast to Dachau (BBC Northern Ireland)	New Found Land: "Elephant Boy" (STV and Grampian); New Found Land: "IM" (STV and Grampian)
Presenter	Lorraine Kelly – LK Today, GMTV (GMTV)	Bruce Parry – Tribe (BBC Two); Jeremy Clarkson – Top Gear (BBC Two)
Science & Natural History	Anatomy for Beginners (Channel 4)	Life Before Birth (Channel 4); Extraordinary People: "The Boy with the Incredible Brain" (Five)
Single Documentary	Children of Beslan (BBC Two)	Make Me Normal (Channel 4); Taxidermy: Stuff the World (BBC Two)
Single Drama	The Government Inspector (Channel 4)	Ahead of the Class (ITV); A Waste of Shame (BBC Four)
Situation Comedy and Comedy Drama	The Thick of It (BBC Four)	ShakespeaRe-Told: "Much Ado About Nothing" (BBC One); Peep Show (Channel 4)
Soap and Continuing Drama	Emmerdale (ITV)	Coronation Street (ITV); EastEnders (BBC One)
Writer: Comedy	Sam Bain and Jesse Armstrong for Peep Show (Channel 4)	Brian Dooley for The Smoking Room (BBC Three); The Writing Team for The Thick of It (BBC Four)
Writing: Drama	Andrew Davies for Bleak House (BBC One)	Jed Mercurio for Bodies (BBC Three); Paul Abbott for Shameless (Channel 4)

2005 winners (Programme Awards 2004)

In 2005 the event award was once again dropped to make way for a new digital channel programme award and the writing award was split into two awards; writer: comedy, and writer: drama. No RTS Gold Medal recipient is recorded for this year.

Presented: 15 March 2005 – Host: Kate Thornton
Award	Winners	Nominees
Judges' Award	Paul Abbott	–
Actor: Female	Anamaria Marinca as Elena Visinescu in Sex Traffic (Channel 4)	Lia Williams as Ella Wilson in May 33rd (BBC One); Shirley Henderson as Charlotte in Dirty Filthy Love (ITV)
Actor: Male	Gerard McSorley as Michael Gallagher in Omagh (Channel 4)	Michael Sheen as Mark in Dirty Filthy Love (ITV); Steven Mackintosh as Ray Knight in England Expects (BBC One)
Arts	The South Bank Show: "Robert Frank" (ITV)	Flashmob The Opera (BBC Three); The Prince, The Showgirl and Me (BBC Four)
Children's Drama	Tracy Beaker: The Movie of Me (Channel 4)	My Life as a Popat (CITV); Shoebox Zoo (CBBC)
Children's Programme	No Girls Allowed (Shake!)	Kirsten Goes the Extra Mile to India (BBC); The Stables (CBBC)
Comedy Performance	Tamsin Greig as Dr. Caroline Todd in Green Wing (Channel 4)	Matt Lucas and David Walliams – Little Britain (BBC Three); Peter Kay as various characters in Max and Paddy's Road to Nowhere (Channel 4)
Daytime Programme	The Paul O'Grady Show (ITV)	A Place in the Sun (Channel 4)
Documentary Series	The Power of Nightmares (BBC Two)	My Crazy Parents (Channel 4); The Trouble with Black Men (BBC Three)
Digital Channel Programme	Virtual History: Secret Plot to Kill Hitler (Discovery Channel)	Flashmob The Opera (BBC Three); The Heart of a Lioness (Animal Planet)
Drama Serial	Sex Traffic (Channel 4)	Blackpool (BBC One); Conviction (BBC Three)
Drama Series	Shameless (Channel 4)	Bodies (BBC Three); Life Begins (ITV)
Entertainment	Strictly Come Dancing (BBC One)	Ant & Dec's Saturday Night Takeaway (ITV); Derren Brown: Tricks of the Mind (Channel 4)
Entertainment Performance	Ant & Dec – Ant & Dec's Saturday Night Takeaway (ITV)	Derren Brown – Séance (Channel 4); Jonathan Ross – Friday Night with Jonathan Ross (BBC One)
Features and Factual Entertainment	Supernanny (Channel 4)	Grand Designs Abroad (Channel 4); Ramsay's Kitchen Nightmares (Channel 4)
History	The Guinea Pig Club (BBC Four)	D-Day: The Ultimate Conflict (Channel 5); Virtual History: Secret Plot to Kill Hitler (Discovery Channel)
International	The Sopranos (Channel 4)	City of Men (BBC Four); The Apprentice (BBC Two)
Nations and Regions Presenter	Stephen Nolan – Nolan Live / Fair Play / The Right Move (BBC Northern Ireland)	Samantha Poling – Frontline Scotland: "Security Wars" (BBC); Stephen Jardine (STV)
Nations and Regions Programme	My Name is Paul (BBC Northern Ireland)	Gutted (BBC Scotland); Hidden Gifts: The Mystery of Angus MacPhee (Grampian)
Newcomer – Behind the Scenes	Patrick Collerton – The Boy Whose Skin Fell Off (Channel 4)	Damian Fitzsimmons – The Afternoon Play: "Viva Las Blackpool" (BBC One); Kate Lewis – Blackpool (BBC One) and The Alan Clark Diaries (BBC Four)
Newcomer – On Screen	Catherine Tate as various characters in The Catherine Tate Show (BBC Two)	Sam Aston as Chesney Brown in Coronation Street (ITV); Thomas Morrison as Danny Holden in Blackpool (BBC One)
Presenter	Michael Palin – Himalaya with Michael Palin (BBC One)	Bill Oddie – Britain Goes Wild with Bill Oddie (BBC Two); Fern Britton and Phillip Schofield – This Morning (ITV)
Science & Natural History	Your Life in Their Hands (BBC One)	Horizon: "Atkins Diet" (BBC Two); Secret Intersex (Channel 4)
Single Documentary	Stealing a Nation: A Special Report by John Pilger (ITV)	The Boy Whose Skin Fell Off (Channel 4); The Orphans of Nkandla (BBC Four)
Single Drama	Dirty Filthy Love (ITV)	Hawking (BBC Two); Omagh (Channel 4)
Situation Comedy and Comedy Drama	Nighty Night (BBC Three)	Green Wing (Channel 4); Peep Show (Channel 4)
Soap and Continuing Drama	Coronation Street (ITV)	EastEnders (BBC One); Emmerdale (ITV)
Writer: Comedy	Julia Davis for Nighty Night (BBC Three)	Sam Bain and Jesse Armstrong for Peep Show (Channel 4); Victoria Pile & the Green Wing writing team for Green Wing (Channel 4)
Writing: Drama	Paul Abbott for Shameless (Channel 4)	Guy Hibbert and Paul Greengrass for Omagh (Channel 4); Jed Mercurio for Bodies (BBC Three)

2004 winners (Programme Awards 2003)

In 2004 the acquired award introduced the previous year was redesignated as the international award and the serials & single drama award was once again split back into two separate awards, namely the drama serial award and the single drama award. No RTS Gold Medal recipient is recorded for this year.

Presented: 16 March 2004 – Host: Jimmy Carr
Award	Winners	Nominees
Judges' Award	Greg Dyke	–
Actor: Female	Kate Ashfield as Sadie MacGregor in This Little Life (BBC Two)	Bronagh Gallagher as Sarah Norton in Holy Cross (BBC One); Joanne Froggatt as Danielle Cable in Danielle Cable: Eyewitness (ITV)
Actor: Male	David Morrissey as Gordon Brown in The Deal (Channel 4)	Antony Sher as Gerald Ballantyne in Home (BBC Four); Bill Nighy as Cameron Foster in State of Play (BBC One)
Arts	Operatunity (Channel 4)	George Orwell: A Life in Pictures (BBC Two); Jump London (Channel 4)
Children's Drama	Girls in Love (CITV)	Bus Life: "Bad Hair Day" (Disney Channel); The Illustrated Mum (Channel 4)
Children's Programme	UP2U (BBC)	Dick & Dom in da Bungalow (CBBC); Jungle Run (CITV)
Comedy Performance	David Walliams and Matt Lucas – Little Britain (BBC Three)	Jocelyn Jee Esien – 3 Non-Blondes (BBC Three); Ricky Gervais as David Brent in The Office: "Christmas Specials" (BBC Two)
Daytime Programme	Britain's Secret Shame (BBC One)	Richard & Judy (Channel 4); Trisha (ITV)
Documentary Series	The Last Peasants (Channel 4)	National Trust (BBC Four); Surviving Extremes (Channel 4)
Drama Serial	State of Play (BBC One)	The Lost Prince (BBC One); The Second Coming (ITV)
Drama Series	Spooks (BBC One)	At Home with the Braithwaites (ITV); Teachers (Channel 4)
Entertainment	Little Britain (BBC Three)	Ant & Dec's Saturday Night Takeaway (ITV); Bo' Selecta! (Channel 4)
Entertainment Performance	Jonathan Ross – Friday Night with Jonathan Ross (BBC One)	Ant & Dec – Saturday Night Takeaway / I'm a Celebrity... Get Me Out of Here! / Pop Idol (ITV); Mark Steel – The Mark Steel Lectures (BBC Four)
Event	Comic Relief: "The Big Hair Do" (BBC Two)	-
Features and Factual Entertainment	Holiday Showdown (ITV)	How Clean Is Your House? (Channel 4); Wife Swap (Channel 4)
History	Georgian Underworld: "Invitation to a Hanging" (Channel 4)	Colosseum: A Gladiator's Story (BBC One); Killing Hitler (BBC Two)
International Award	24 (BBC Two / BBC Three)	Sex and the City (Channel 4); Six Feet Under (E4 / Channel 4)
Nations and Regions Presenter	Gerry Anderson – Anderson in... (BBC Northern Ireland)	Lucinda Lambton – Sublime Suburbia (Carlton); Michele Newman – It's Your Shout / Pulling Power (ITV Central)
Nations and Regions Programme	Christine's Children (BBC Northern Ireland)	Chancers (BBC Scotland)
Newcomer – Behind the Scenes	Sarah Gavron – This Little Life (BBC Two)	Avie Luthra – Canterbury Tales: "The Sea Captain's Tale" (BBC One); Helen Blakeman – Pleasureland (Channel 4)
Newcomer – On Screen	Katie Lyon as Joanna Mosscroft in Pleasureland (Channel 4)	Harry Eden as Russell Wade in Real Men (BBC Two); Marc Wootton in My New Best Friend (Channel 4)
Presenter - Factual	Melvyn Bragg – The Adventure of English (ITV) / The South Bank Show (ITV)	Ben Lewis – Art Safari (BBC Four); Nigel Marven – Sea Monsters / Land of Giants (BBC)
Science & Natural History	Motherland (BBC Two)	DNA (Channel 4); Seven Wonders of the Industrial World (BBC Two)
Single Documentary	The Secret Policeman (BBC One)	Living with Michael Jackson (ITV); One Life: "Size Doesn't Matter" (BBC One)
Single Drama	This Little Life (BBC Two)	Larkin: Love Again (BBC Two); The Deal (Channel 4)
Situation Comedy and Comedy Drama	The Office: "Christmas Specials" (BBC Two)	Marion and Geoff (BBC Two); Peep Show (Channel 4)
Soap and Continuing Drama	Coronation Street (ITV)	Doctors (BBC One); EastEnders (BBC One)
Writing	Paul Abbott for State of Play (BBC One)	Russell T Davies for The Second Coming (ITV); Terry Cafolla for Holy Cross (BBC One)

2003 winners (Programme Awards 2002)

2003 saw two completely new categories introduced in the shape of the acquired programme award and the comedy performance award. An event award was also reintroduced, similar to the live event award that had been last bestowed in 1998. The team award was retired in this year.

Presented: 18 March 2003 – Host: Kirsty Young
Award	Winners	Nominees
RTS Gold Medal	David Liddiment	–
Judges' Award	Peter Bazalgette	–
Acquired Programme	Six Feet Under (HBO / Channel 4)	In Memoriam (HBO); My Sperm Donor Dad (BBC Four)
Actor: Female	Julie Walters as Angela Maurer in Murder (BBC Two)	Jessica Stevenson as Victoria in Tomorrow La Scala! (BBC Two); Lesley Manville as Mandy Greenfield in Bodily Harm (Channel 4)
Actor: Male	Christopher Eccleston as Joe Broughton in Flesh and Blood (BBC Two)	Albert Finney as Winston Churchill in The Gathering Storm (BBC Two); Timothy Spall as Mitchel Greenfield in Bodily Harm (Channel 4)
Arts	The Strange World of Barry Who? (BBC Four)	The Man Who Destroyed Everything (BBC Four); When She Died... (Death of a Princess) (Channel 4)
Children's Factual	Serious Jungle (CBBC)	RAD: The Grommets Tour (Channel 5); Stuff: "Episode 2" (CITV)
Children's Fictional	Double Act (4Learning)	My Parents Are Aliens (CITV); The Story of Tracy Beaker (CBBC)
Comedy Performance	Ricky Gervais as David Brent in The Office (BBC Two)	Peter Kay as Brian Potter in Phoenix Nights (Channel 4); Steve Coogan as Alan Partridge in I'm Alan Partridge (BBC Two)
Daytime Programme	Today with Des and Mel (ITV)	Cash in the Attic (BBC One); GMTV
Documentary Series	The Hunt for Britain's Paedophiles (BBC Two)	The Century of the Self (BBC Two); The Trust (Channel 4)
Drama Series	Clocking Off (BBC One)	Cutting It (BBC One); Spooks (BBC One)
Entertainment	Pop Idol: "The Final" & "Results Show" (ITV)	2DTV (ITV); Friday Night with Jonathan Ross (BBC One)
Entertainment Performance	Jonathan Ross – Friday Night with Jonathan Ross (BBC One) / They Think It's All Over (BBC One)	Ant & Dec – I'm a Celebrity... Get Me Out of Here! (ITV); Graham Norton – V Graham Norton (Channel 4)
Event	The Jubilee Weekend (BBC One)	The Autopsy (Channel 4); Test the Nation (BBC One)
Features Primetime	Lads' Army (ITV)	Jamie's Kitchen (Channel 4); What Not to Wear (BBC Two)
History	Dambusters: Revealed (Channel 5)	A History of Britain (BBC Two); Battle of the Atlantic (BBC Two)
Nations and Regions Presenter	Dewi Pws – Byd Pws (S4C)	Jane Harvey – X-Ray (BBC Wales); Mark Carruthers – BBC Newsline / Let's Talk / Spotlight (BBC Northern Ireland)
Nations and Regions Programme	Ar Y Stryd (S4C)	Do Armed Robbers Have Love Affairs? (BBC Northern Ireland); Silence of the Lambs (Yorkshire Television)
Newcomer – Behind the Scenes	David Modell – Young, Nazi and Proud (Channel 4)	Diederick Santer – Cutting It (BBC One)
Newcomer – On Screen	Jimmy Carr – Your Face or Mine? (E4)	Charles Hazlewood – BBC Proms (BBC One); Lucy Gaskell as Ruby Ferris in Cutting It (BBC One)
Presenter	Susannah Constantine and Trinny Woodall – What Not to Wear (BBC Two)	Dan Cruickshank – Omnibus: "The Lost Treasure of Kabul" (BBC Two); Fern Britton – This Morning (ITV)
Science & Natural History	Superfly (BBC Four)	Death (Channel 4); Weird Nature: "Marvellous Motion" (BBC One)
Serials and Single Drama	Out of Control (BBC One)	Bloody Sunday (ITV); Tomorrow La Scala! (BBC Two)
Single Documentary	House of War (Channel 4)	SAS – Embassy Siege (BBC Two); Smallpox 2002: Silent Weapon (BBC Two)
Situation Comedy and Comedy Drama	Phoenix Nights (Channel 4)	Auf Wiedersehen, Pet (BBC One); The Office (BBC Two)
Soap and Continuing Drama	Coronation Street (ITV)	Doctors (BBC One); Emmerdale (ITV)
Writing	Peter Bowker for Flesh and Blood (BBC Two)	Paul Greengrass for Bloody Sunday (ITV); David Wolstencroft and Howard Brenton for Spooks (BBC One)

2002 winners (Programme Awards 2001)

In 2002 three new awards were introduced; the soap and continuing drama award; the science & natural history award; and the history award. Other changes saw the children's drama and the children's entertainment categories merged to become the children's fictional award; and the drama serial award merged with the single drama award. Awards for documentary strand and regional documentary were retired.

Presented: 19 March 2002 – Host: Graham Norton
Award	Winners	Nominees
RTS Gold Medal	BBC Natural History Unit	–
Judges' Award	Nick Elliott (ITV network head of drama)	–
Actor: Female	Diane Parish as Lesley Bailey in Babyfather (BBC Two)	Lesley Sharp as Rose Cooper in Bob & Rose (ITV); Shirley Henderson as Marie Melmotte in The Way We Live Now (BBC One)
Actor: Male	David Suchet as Augustus Melmotte in The Way We Live Now (BBC One)	Ken Stott as Inspector Pat Chappel in The Vice (ITV); Ricky Gervais as David Brent in The Office (BBC Two)
Arts	Arena: "James Ellory's Feast of Death" (BBC Two)	Omnibus: "The Billy Elliot Boy" (BBC One); The South Bank Show: "Joanna MacGregor" (ITV)
Children's Factual	Nick News: "WisedUp" (Nickelodeon)	Finger Tips (CITV); Newsround: "Sierra Leone: The Battle for Childhood" (CBBC)
Children's Fictional	My Parents Are Aliens (CITV)	Eddy & The Bear (ITV); Out of the Ashes (BBC One)
Daytime Programme	The Weakest Link (BBC Two)	The Wright Stuff (Channel 5)
Documentary Series	Living with Cancer (BBC One)	Lifters (BBC Two); Testing God (Channel 4)
Drama Series	Clocking Off (BBC One)	At Home with the Braithwaites (ITV); Teachers (Channel 4)
Entertainment	Banzai (E4)	Comic Relief (BBC Two); The Kumars at No. 42 (BBC Two)
Entertainment Performance	Alistair McGowan – Alistair McGowan's Big Impression (BBC One)	Graham Norton – So Graham Norton (Channel 4); Jonathan Ross – They Think It's All Over (BBC One)
Features Primetime	Faking It (Channel 4)	Grand Designs: "Huddersfield" (Channel 4); Would Like to Meet (BBC Two)
History	Fire, Plague, War and Treason (Channel 4)	Endgame in Ireland (BBC Two); Time of Our Lives (ITV)
Nations and Regions Presenter	Tam Cowan – Taxi for Cowan / Offside (BBC Scotland)	Christine Bleakley (BBC Northern Ireland); Sarah Mack (Grampian Television)
Nations and Regions Programme	Tartan Shorts: "Cry for Bobo" (BBC Scotland)	Close Up North: "Railing Against It" (BBC Yorkshire); The Bench (BBC Wales)
Newcomer – Behind the Scenes	Marc Isaacs – The Lift (Channel 4)	Daniel Brocklehurst – Clocking Off (BBC One) / Linda Green (BBC One)
Newcomer – On Screen	Johnny Vegas as Charlie Doyle in Happiness (BBC Two)	Holly Scourfield as Chloe in When I Was 12 (BBC Two); Omid Djalili in Bloody Foreigners (Channel 4)
Presenter	Ant & Dec – SMTV Live (ITV)	Louis Theroux – When Louis Met... (BBC Two); Rolf Harris – Rolf on Art (BBC)
Science & Natural History	Congo (BBC Two)	Horizon: "What Sank The Kursk?" (BBC Two); The Blue Planet (BBC One)
Serials and Single Drama	Perfect Strangers (BBC Two)	Bob & Rose (ITV); The Navigators (Channel 4)
Single Documentary	Kelly and Her Sisters (ITV)	Cutting Edge: "Brian's Story" (Channel 4); One Day of Terror: New York Witnesses (BBC Two)
Situation Comedy and Comedy Drama	The Office (BBC Two)	Brass Eye (Channel 4); Phoenix Nights (Channel 4)
Soap and Continuing Drama	EastEnders (BBC One)	Doctors (BBC One); Hollyoaks (Channel 4)
Team	Kumbh Mela: The Greatest Show on Earth (Channel 4)	Last Night of The Proms (BBC One); My Family (BBC One)
Writing	Stephen Poliakoff for Perfect Strangers (BBC Two)	Andrew Davies for The Way We Live Now (BBC One); Sally Wainwright for At Home with the Braithwaites (ITV)

2001 winners (Programme Awards 2000)

No RTS Gold Medal recipient is recorded for this year.

Presented: 20 March 2001
Award	Winners	Nominees
Judges' Award	John Willis (MD: LWT & United Productions)	–
Actor: Female	Katy Murphy as Lucy Pannick in Donovan Quick (BBC Scotland)	Lesley Manville as Nadine in Other People's Children (BBC One); Sophie Okonedo as Jo Weller in Never Never (Channel 4)
Actor: Male	Steven Mackintosh as Davey Younger in Care (BBC One)	Alun Armstrong as George Oldfield on This Is Personal: The Hunt for the Yorkshire Ripper (ITV); Phil Davis as Peter McLeish in North Square (Channel 4)
Arts	Arena: "Wisconsin Death Trip" (BBC Two)	Howard Goodall's Big Bangs (Channel 4)
Children's Drama	My Parents Are Aliens (CITV)	Microsoap (CBBC)
Children's Entertainment	SMTV Live (ITV)	Grizzly Tales for Gruesome Kids (ITV); The Rottentrolls (CITV)
Children's Factual	Blue Peter (BBC One)	Short Change (CBBC); The Investigators (Channel 4)
Documentary Series	15 (Channel 4)	Love is Not Enough (BBC One); The Day the World Took Off (Channel 4)
Documentary Strand	Correspondent (BBC Two)	Horizon (BBC Two); Real Life (ITV)
Drama Serial	Nature Boy (BBC Two)	Never Never (Channel 4); This Is Personal: The Hunt for the Yorkshire Ripper (ITV)
Drama Series	Clocking Off (BBC One)	At Home with the Braithwaites (ITV); Hearts and Bones (BBC One)
Entertainment	Da Ali G Show (Channel 4)	The Frank Skinner Show (ITV); Trigger Happy TV (Channel 4)
Features Daytime	Watercolour Challenge (Channel 4)	A Place in the Sun (Channel 4); Live Talk (ITV)
Features Primetime	Big Brother (Channel 4)	Scrapheap Challenge (Channel 4); The Naked Chef (BBC Two)
Newcomer – Behind the Scenes	Liza Marshall – The Sins (BBC One)	–
Newcomer – On Screen	Rob Brydon in Marion and Geoff (BBC Two)	Dom Joly in Trigger Happy TV (Channel 4); James Corden as Jamie Rymer in Fat Friends (ITV)
Presenter	Graham Norton – So Graham Norton (Channel 4)	Chris Tarrant – Who Wants to Be a Millionaire? (ITV); Davina McCall – Big Brother (Channel 4)
Regional Documentary	Spotlight: "Capitol Hill" (BBC Northern Ireland)	Ex-S: "The Drowned Village" (BBC Scotland); Showing Off (BBC East)
Regional Presenter	Stephen Jardine (STV)	Alastair Stewart – Who Wants To Be A London Mayor? (Carlton); Donna Traynor (BBC Northern Ireland)
Regional Programme	'New Found Land: "I Saw You" (STV / Grampian)	Chewin' the Fat (BBC Scotland); Just Desserts (HTV)
Single Documentary	True Stories: "100% White" (Channel 4)	News from Number 10 (BBC Two); The Man Who Bought Mustique (Channel 4)
Single Drama	Storm Damage (BBC Two)	Care (BBC One); Donovan Quick (BBC Scotland)
Situation Comedy and Comedy Drama	The Royle Family (BBC Two)	Cold Feet (ITV); One Foot in the Grave (BBC One)
Team	Big Brother (Channel 4)	Castaway 2000 (BBC One); Children in Need: "21st Birthday Edition" (BBC One)
Television Performance	Julia Davis – Human Remains (BBC Two)	Dom Joly – Trigger Happy TV (Channel 4); Rob Brydon – Marion and Geoff (BBC Two)
Writing	Paul Abbott for Clocking Off (BBC One)	Kieran Prendiville for Care (BBC One); Tony Marchant for Never Never (Channel 4)

2000 winners (Programme Awards 1999)

Presented: 21 March 2000
Award	Winners	Nominees
RTS Gold Medal	BSkyB	–
Judges' Award	Peter Symes (BBC director)	–
Actor: Female	Thora Hird as Annie in Lost for Words (ITV)	Lindsay Duncan as Marilyn Truman in Shooting the Past (BBC Two); Marianne Jean-Baptiste as Doreen Lawrence in The Murder of Stephen Lawrence (ITV)
Actor: Male	Michael Gambon as Squire Hamley in Wives and Daughters (BBC One)	Ken Stott as Inspector Pat Chappel in The Vice (ITV); Matthew Macfadyen as Private Alan James in Warriors (BBC One)
Arts	This is Modern Art (Channel 4)	Renaissance (BBC Two); The South Bank Show: "Javier de Frutos" (ITV)
Children's Drama	See How They Run (BBC)	My Parents Are Aliens (CITV); Pig-Heart Boy (CBBC)
Children's Entertainment	SMTV Live (ITV)	Jungle Run (CITV); Miami 7 (CBBC)
Children's Factual	Nick News: "WisedUp" (Nickelodeon)	North Hollywood High (Channel 4); Wise Up (Channel 4)
Documentary Series	The Decision (Channel 4)	Station X (Channel 4); The Second World War in Colour (ITV)
Documentary Strand	Horizon (BBC Two)	Secret History (Channel 4); Natural World (BBC Two)
Drama Serial	Shooting the Past (BBC Two)	Queer as Folk (Channel 4); Trust (ITV)
Drama Series	The Cops (BBC Two)	The Vice (ITV)
Entertainment	The League of Gentlemen (BBC Two)	Have I Got News for You (BBC One); Smack the Pony (Channel 4)
Features Daytime	Show Me the Money (Channel 4)	City Hospital (BBC One); Nick Ross (BBC Two)
Features Primetime	The 1900 House (Channel 4)	Ground Force (BBC One); The Naked Chef (BBC Two)
Newcomer – Behind the Scenes	David Wolstencroft – Psychos (Channel 4)	Bille Eltringham – Kid in the Corner (Channel 4); John McKay – Psychos (Channel 4)
Newcomer – On Screen	Jamie Oliver presenting The Naked Chef (BBC Two)	Eric Byrne as Daniel Letts in Kid in the Corner (Channel 4); Nigel Marven presenting Giants (ITV)
Presenter	Johnny Vaughan – The Big Breakfast (Channel 4)	Chris Tarrant – Who Wants to Be a Millionaire? (ITV); Donal MacIntyre – MacIntyre Undercover (BBC One)
Regional Documentary	Spinners and Losers (STV)	Close Up North: "Dying To Get There" (BBC North); Landladies (Carlton Central)
Regional Presenter	Roy Noble – Common Ground / The Shed (BBC Wales)	Mike Bushell – South Today (BBC South); Noel Thompson – BBC Newsline / Hearts and Minds (BBC Northern Ireland)
Regional Programme	Nuts and Bolts (HTV)	Soul Music (Carlton Central); Voices of a Nation (BBC Wales)
Single Documentary	Malcolm and Barbara: A Love Story (ITV)	Divorce Iranian Style (Channel 4); Gulag (BBC Two)
Single Drama	Warriors (BBC One)	Dockers (Channel 4); Lost for Words (ITV)
Situation Comedy and Comedy Drama	People Like Us (BBC Two)	Coming Soon (Channel 4); The Royle Family (BBC Two)
Team	Walking with Dinosaurs (BBC One)	The 1900 House (Channel 4); Warriors (BBC One)
Television Performance	Rory Bremner – Bremner, Bird and Fortune (Channel 4)	Graham Norton – So Graham Norton (Channel 4); Sacha Baron Cohen – Ali G (Channel 4)
Writing	Caroline Aherne & Craig Cash for The Royle Family (BBC Two)	Leigh Jackson for Warriors (BBC One); Stephen Poliakoff – Shooting the Past (BBC Two)

1999 winners (Programme Awards 1998)

This year saw a special recognition award for the Channel 4 comedy series Father Ted to mark Dermot Morgan's passing in February 1998. The features award was split into two categories: Daytime and Primetime, and the live event award was discontinued.

Presented: 29 March 1999 – Host: Trisha Goddard
Award	Winners	Nominees
RTS Gold Medal	Roger Laughton	–
Judges' Award	Andrea Wonfor	–
Special Recognition Award	Father Ted	–
Actor: Female	Thora Hird as Violet in Talking Heads: "Waiting for the Telegram" (BBC Two)	Ger Ryan as Rose in Amongst Women (BBC Two); Natasha Little as Becky Sharp in Vanity Fair (BBC One)
Actor: Male	Ray Winstone as Woody Williamson in Our Boy (BBC One)	Tony Doyle as Moran in Amongst Women (BBC Two); Tony Maudsley as Stefan Kiszko in A Life for A Life (ITV)
Arts	Close Up: "This England" (BBC Two)	Arena: "The Brian Epstein Story" (BBC Two); Vile Bodies: "Naked" (Channel 4)
Children's Drama	Microsoap (CBBC)	Blabbermouth & Stickybeak (Channel 4); The Worst Witch (CITV)
Children's Entertainment	The First Snow of Winter (BBC)	The Bear (Channel 4)
Children's Factual	The Fame Game (BBC One)	The Really Wild Show (CBBC); Wise Up (Channel 4)
Documentary Series	Windrush (BBC Two)	The Clintons: A Marriage of Power (Channel 4); The 50 Years War: Israel and the Arabs (BBC Two)
Documentary Strand	Natural World (BBC Two)	Inside Story (BBC One); Return of the Ba Ba Zee (Channel 4)
Drama Serial	The Young Person's Guide to Becoming a Rock Star (Channel 4)	Amongst Women (BBC Two); Our Mutual Friend (BBC Two)
Drama Series	Jonathan Creek (BBC One)	Hornblower (ITV); Playing the Field (BBC One)
Entertainment	Who Wants to Be a Millionaire? (ITV)	Big Train (BBC Two); So Graham Norton (Channel 4)
Features Daytime	City Hospital (BBC One)	Lowri (BBC Two)
Features Primetime	Time Team (Channel 4)	Deadly Crocodiles with Steve Irwin (ITV); Two Fat Ladies (BBC Two)
Newcomer – Behind the Scenes	Damien O'Donnell – Thirty Five Aside (BBC Two)	Anil Gupta – Goodness Gracious Me (BBC Two); Leo Regan – Don't Get High On Your Own Supply (Channel 4)
Newcomer – On Screen	Tony Maudsley as Stefan Kiszko in A Life for A Life (ITV)	Ian Wright presenting Friday Night's All Wright (LWT); Sanjeev Bhaskar as various characters in Goodness Gracious Me (BBC Two)
Presenter	David Attenborough – The Life of Birds (BBC One)	Alan Titchmarsh – Ground Force (BBC One) / Gardeners' World (BBC Two); Mel and Sue – Late Lunch (Channel 4)
Regional Documentary	Put to the Test (BBC Northern Ireland)	Ex-S: "Frankie Miller: Stubborn Kinda Fella" (BBC Scotland); Paying for the Piper (STV)
Regional Presenter	Noel Thompson (BBC Northern Ireland)	Marsali Stewart – Up For It! (BBC Scotland); Vincent Kane – Kane / Week In Week Out Special (BBC Wales)
Regional Programme	A Light in the Valley (BBC Wales)	Making a Difference (BBC Northern Ireland); Scotland's Larder: "From Angus to Andalucia" (STV)
Single Documentary	Modern Times: "Drinking for England" (BBC Two)	Everyman: "Surviving Lockerbie" (BBC One; Under the Sun: "What Sort of Gentleman Are You After?" (BBC)
Single Drama	A Rather English Marriage (BBC Two)	Our Boy (BBC One); Talking Heads: "Playing Sandwiches" (BBC Two)
Situation Comedy and Comedy Drama	Cold Feet (ITV)	Ted and Ralph (BBC Two); The Royle Family (BBC Two)
Team	Goodness Gracious Me (BBC Two)	The Cops (BBC Two); The Human Body (BBC One)
Television Performance	Rory Bremner – Rory Bremner, Who Else? (Channel 4)	Peter Kay – Comedy Lab: "The Services" (Channel 4 / E4); Simon Pegg – Big Train (BBC Two)
Writing	Peter Berry for A Life for A Life (ITV)	Bryan Elsley for The Young Person's Guide to Becoming a Rock Star (Channel 4); Frank Deasy for Looking After Jo Jo (BBC Two)

1998 winners (Programme Awards 1997)

In 1998 the following new awards were instituted: Documentary strand; Features; Newcomer – behind the scenes; and Newcomer – on screen.

Presented: March 1998
Award	Winners	Nominees
RTS Gold Medal	Trevor McDonald	-
Judges' Award	Michael Wearing	-
Actor: Female	Sinéad Cusack as Charlotte Dawson in Have Your Cake and Eat It (BBC One)	Miranda Richardson as Pamela Flitton A Dance to the Music of Time (Channel 4); Patsy Palmer as Bianca Jackson in EastEnders (BBC One)
Actor: Male	Simon Russell Beale as Widmerpool in A Dance to the Music of Time (Channel 4)	David Morrissey as Shaun in Holding On (BBC Two); Robson Green as D.I. Dave Creegan in Touching Evil (ITV) / as Owen Spinger in Reckless (ITV)
Arts	The South Bank Show: "Gilbert & George" (LWT)	Bookmark: "Stevie Smith – Not Waving but Drowning" (BBC Two); Dancing for Dollars: The Bolshoi in Vegas (Channel 4)
Children's Drama	Sunny's Ears (Carlton)	Knight School (Granada Television)
Children's Entertainment	Teletubbies (BBC Two)	Get Your Own Back (BBC One); Wolves, Witches and Giants: "The Three Wishes" (Carlton)
Children's Factual	Newsround: "Bullying" (BBC One)	As Seen on TV: "Reading" (BBC Two); The Lowdown: "Strictly Wimbledon" (BBC One)
Documentary Series	Breaking Point (BBC Two)	Ian Hislop's School Rules (Channel 4); The Nazis: A Warning from History (BBC Two)
Documentary Strand	Witness (Channel 4)	Equinox (Channel 4); Picture This (BBC Two)
Drama Serial	Holding On (BBC Two)	Born to Run (BBC One); The Lakes (BBC One)
Drama Series	This Life (BBC Two)	Touching Evil (ITV); Where the Heart Is (ITV)
Entertainment	Harry Enfield & Chums (BBC One)	An Audience with Elton John (LWT); Brass Eye (Channel 4)
Features	Back to the Floor (BBC Two)	Light Lunch (Channel 4); Mrs Cohen's Money (Channel 4)
Live Event	Funeral of Diana, Princess of Wales (BBC One)	The Funeral of Diana, Princess of Wales (ITV); Handover of Hong Kong (BBC One)
Newcomer – Behind the Scenes	Paul McGuigan – The Granton Star Cause (Channel 4)	Jane Featherstone – Touching Evil (ITV)
Newcomer – On Screen	Adam Buxton & Joe Cornish – The Adam and Joe Show (Channel 4)	Alan Davies as Jonathan Creek in Jonathan Creek (BBC One); Max Beesley as Tom Jones in The History of Tom Jones: A Foundling (BBC One)
Presenter	Jeremy Clarkson – Top Gear (BBC Two)	Mark Lamarr – Never Mind the Buzzcocks (BBC Two); Michael Palin – Full Circle with Michael Palin (BBC One)
Regional Documentary	Tales from the Health Service: A Doctor's Tale (BBC Wales)	The Last Invasion (S4C / BBC Wales); There's Only One Barry Fry (Anglia)
Regional Presenter	Noel Thompson – Hearts and Minds (BBC Northern Ireland)	Anna Richardson – Love Bites (LWT); Shelley Jofre – Frontline Scotland (BBC Scotland)
Regional Programme	Food For Ravens (BBC Wales)	Northern Lights: "The Freesia of Eden" (BBC Northern Ireland); Tartan Shorts: "Gasman" (BBC Scotland)
Single Documentary	True Stories: "The Grave" (Channel 4)	Dunblane: Remembering our Children (Meridian)
Single Drama	The Granton Star Cause (Channel 4)	Bumping The Odds (BBC Two); Trial & Retribution (ITV)
Situation Comedy and Comedy Drama	The Vicar of Dibley (BBC One)	Cold Feet (ITV); I'm Alan Partridge (BBC Two)
Team	Time Team Live (Channel 4)	BBC Bristol Observational Documentaries Team (BBC One / BBC Two); Night Fever (Channel 5)
Television Performance	Chris Morris – Brass Eye (Channel 4)	Harry Enfield – Harry Enfield & Chums (BBC One); Steve Coogan – The Tony Ferrino Phenomenon (BBC Two) / I'm Alan Partridge (BBC Two)
Writing	Tony Marchant for Holding On (BBC Two)	Debbie Horsfield for Born to Run (BBC One); Paul Abbott for Touching Evil (ITV) / Reckless (ITV)

== Winners: 1989–1997 ==
In 1989 the awards categories underwent a major revision and several new categories were created. These new awards were retrospectively conferred for the award year of 1988. It was also in 1989 that nominations were introduced in certain categories for the very first time.

Single Drama

- 1988: Tumbledown
- 1989: Nobody Here but us Chickens (Channel 4)
- 1990: Shoot to Kill
- 1991: Prime Suspect
- 1992: Hedd Wyn
- 1993: The Snapper
- 1994: Screen Two – Criminal
- 1995: 11 Men Against 11 (Channel Four)
- 1996: Hillsborough

Drama Series

- 1988: Blind Justice (BBC)
- 1989: A Bit of a Do
- 1990: Inspector Morse
- 1991: Casualty
- 1992: Between the Lines: "Out of the Game"
- 1993: Cracker
- 1994: Common As Muck
- 1995: All Quiet on the Preston Front
- 1996: Ballykissangel

Drama Serial

- 1988: A Very British Coup
- 1989: Nice Work
- 1990: Oranges Are Not The Only Fruit
- 1991: Children of the North
- 1992: Goodbye Cruel World
- 1993: Tales of the City
- 1994: Common as Muck
- 1995: Hearts and Minds
- 1996: Our Friends in the North

Single Documentary

- 1988: Afghantsi
- 1989: Four Hours in My Lai
- 1990: Red Hot (Central TV)
- 1991: The Leader, His Driver and the Driver's Wife
- 1992: Katie and Eilish: Siamese Twins (Yorkshire TV)
- 1993: Disappearing World: "We Are All Neighbours"
- 1994: 25 Bloody Years: "The Dead" (BBC)
- 1995: True Stories: The Betrayed (Channel Four)
- 1996: True Stories: Crime of the Wolf (Channel Four)

Documentary Series

- 1988: Armada (BBC South and East)
- 1989: Around the World in 80 Days with Michael Palin
- 1990: Hello Do You Hear Us? (Channel 4)
- 1991: Secret History
- 1992: Pandora's Box: "The League of Gentleman"
- 1993: The Plague (Channel 4)
- 1994: Network First
- 1995: The Factory (Channel Four)
- 1996: The System (BBC)

Situation Comedy (Situation Comedy & Comedy Drama from 1994)

- 1988: The Comic Strip Presents... "The Strike"
- 1989: Blackadder Goes Forth
- 1990: Rab C. Nesbitt
- 1991: One Foot in the Grave: "The Man in the Long Black Coat"
- 1992: One Foot in the Grave: "The Worst Horror of All"
- 1993: One Foot in the Grave
- 1994: Drop the Dead Donkey
- 1995: Men Behaving Badly
- 1996: Only Fools and Horses

Entertainment

- 1988: Alexei Sayle's Stuff
- 1989: Whose Line Is It Anyway?
- 1990: French and Saunders
- 1991: Vic Reeves Big Night Out
- 1992: Victoria Wood's All Day Breakfast
- 1993: Barrymore
- 1994: Don't Forget Your Toothbrush (Channel Four)
- 1995: Shooting Stars
- 1996: The Fast Show

Arts

- 1988: Omnibus: "Whale Nation"
- 1989: Arena: "Tales from Barcelona"
- 1990: Bookmark: "From Moscow to Pietushki"
- 1991: Bookmark: "Dostoevsky's Travels"
- 1992: Bookmark: "Miss Pym's Day Out"
- 1993: The Wonderful, Horrible Life of Leni Riefenstahl
- 1994: Shakespeare on the Estate (BBC)
- 1995: The Homecoming (BBC)
- 1996: Arena: "The Burger and the King"

Outside Broadcast (Live Event from 1993)

- 1988: Scrumdown (Yorkshire TV)
- 1989: Lord Olivier Memorial Service (BBC)
- 1990: 90 Glorious Years (BBC)
- 1991: As it Happens – Moscow New Year (Channel 4)
- 1992: Last Night of the Proms
- 1993: Stiffelio (BBC)
- 1994: D-Day Remembered (BBC)
- 1995: VJ50: The Final Tribute (BBC)
- 1996: Christmas with the Royal Navy (West Country TV)

Regional Programme

- 1988: The Calendar Fashion Show (Yorkshire TV)
- 1989: Charlie Wing (Television South)
- 1990: First Sight: "Baby Alex" (BBC South and East)
- 1991: Scotch and Wry (BBC Scotland)
- 1992: The Snow Show (BBC Scotland)
- 1993: Selected Exits (BBC Wales)
- 1994: The Empire Laughs Back (BBC Northern Ireland)
- 1995: Two Ceasefires and a Wedding (BBC Northern Ireland)
- 1996: Tartan Shorts – The Star (BBC Scotland)

Performance Award: male (Male Actor Award from 1994)

- 1988: Colin Firth (Tumbledown)
- 1989: Alfred Molina (Screen Two: "Virtuoso" / Screen One: "The Accountant")
- 1990: Ian Richardson (House of Cards)
- 1991: Robert Lindsay (G.B.H.)
- 1992: David Jason
- 1993: Robbie Coltrane
- 1994: Tom Wilkinson
- 1995: Robert Carlyle
- 1996: David Jason

Performance Award: female (Female Actor Award from 1994)

- 1988: Maggie Smith (Talking Heads)
- 1989: Janet McTeer (Precious Bane)
- 1990: Charlotte Coleman (Oranges Are Not the Only Fruit)
- 1991: Helen Mirren (Prime Suspect)
- 1992: Julia Sawalha
- 1993: Kathy Burke
- 1994: Jane Horrocks
- 1995: Helen McCrory
- 1996: Stella Gonet

Children's Award: Drama & Light Entertainment (Drama from 1992)

- 1989: Maid Marian and Her Merry Men
- 1990: Press Gang
- 1991: Dodgem (BBC)
- 1992: The Borrowers
- 1993: Just Us (Yorkshire TV)
- 1994: Children's Ward
- 1995: The Queen's Nose
- 1996: Retrace (ITV)

Children's Award: Factual

- 1989: The Lowdown: "Brave Heart"
- 1990: The Lowdown: "Today I am a Man"
- 1991: Mozart is Alive and Well in Milton Keynes (BBC)
- 1992: Newsround Special "SOS; The Suffering of Somalia"
- 1993: It'll Never Work?
- 1994: As Seen on TV: "Sheffield" (BBC)
- 1995: Short Change
- 1996: Wise Up

Children's Award: Entertainment

- 1992: What's The Noise! (BBC)
- 1993: Old Bear Stories
- 1994: ZZZap!
- 1995: Wolves, Witches and Giants
- 1996: The Ant & Dec Show (BBC)

Technique

- 1988: Stephen Seddon – How to Be Cool (Granada)
- 1989: Brendan Shore – Theatre Night: "Metamorphosis"
- 1990: Mike Blakely – Disappearing World: "The Kalasha: Rites of Spring"
- 1991: Stephen Seddon – How to Be Cool (Granada)
- 1992: Lee Eynon – Barcelona Olympics British Medals Sequence (BBC)
- 1993–1995: No awards made

Writer's Award

- 1990: Ben Elton
- 1991: Lynda La Plante
- 1992: Andy Hamilton and Guy Jenkin (Drop the Dead Donkey)
- 1993: Roddy Doyle (The Snapper)
- 1994: Donna Franceschild (Takin' Over the Asylum)
- 1995: Jimmy McGovern and Paul Powell (Love Bites - Go Now)
- 1996: Peter Flannery

Regional Documentary

- 1991: Summer on the Estate: Episode 1 (LWT)
- 1992: The Tuesday Special: "Caution – Our Hands Are Tied"
- 1993: This Mine is Ours (STV)
- 1994: O Flaen Dy Lygaid / Y Ffordd Galeta (S4C)
- 1995: Being There: "Last Post on the River Kwai" (Granada)
- 1996: Home Truths: "A Woman in Twelve" (BBC Northern Ireland)

Team Award

- 1992: The Big Breakfast
- 1993: This Morning
- 1994: Desmond's
- 1995: EastEnders
- 1996: Gulliver's Travels

Presenter

- 1993: Male – Chris Evans (The Big Breakfast)
- 1993: Female – Margi Clarke (The Good Sex Guide)
- 1994: Jon Snow
- 1995: John Tusa
- 1996: Cilla Black

Regional Presenter

- 1993: Eddie Ladd – The Slate (BBC Wales)
- 1994: Jane Franchi (BBC Scotland)
- 1995: Paddy Kielty (BBC Northern Ireland)
- 1996: Kaye Adams

Television Performance (Entertainment Performance from 2001)

- 1994: Rory Bremner
- 1995: Caroline Hook
- 1996: Paul Whitehouse

RTS Gold Medal

- 1989: Owen Edwards
- 1990: David Attenborough
- 1991: Paul Fox
- 1992: Charles Wheeler
- 1993: Dennis Potter
- 1994: Coronation Street and Cilla Black
- 1995: Bill Cotton
- 1996: Michael Grade

Network Newcomer

- 1996: Francesca Joseph

Cyril Bennett Award (merged with Judges' Award in 1994)

- 1989: Roger Bolton
- 1990: Bill Ward
- 1991: Liz Forgan
- 1992: Charles Wheeler
- 1993: Betty Willingale

Judges' Award

- 1988: John Lloyd
- 1989: George Jesse Turner
- 1990: Alan Clarke
- 1991: David Croft
- 1992: Lewis Rudd and Anna Home
- 1993: Brian Large
- 1994: Ted Childs
- 1995: Alan Yentob
- 1996: Tony Garnett

== Winners: 1975–1988 ==
These are the list of winners since the establishment of the RTSP.

Original Programme Award

- 1975: The Burke Special: "The Brian" (BBC)
- 1976: On the Move (BBC)
- 1977: Rock Follies (Thames TV)
- 1978: Horizon 2002 (BBC)
- 1979: The Kenny Everett Video Show (Thames TV)
- 1980: Circuit Eleven Miami (BBC Two)
- 1981: The Hitchhiker's Guide to the Galaxy (BBC)
- 1982: Whoops Apocalypse (LWT)
- 1983: Jane (BBC)
- 1984: The Skin Horse (Central TV)
- 1985: 28 Up (Michael Apted)
- 1986: The Max Headroom Show
- 1987: Phil Cool (BBC)
- 1988: V (Channel 4)

Performance Award

- 1975: Gordon Jackson (Upstairs, Downstairs)
- 1976: Tom Conti (The Glittering Prizes)
- 1977: Siân Phillips (I, Claudius)
- 1978: Peter Barkworth (Professional Foul / Secret Army / The Country Party)
- 1979: Ian Holm (The Lost Boys)
- 1980: Timothy West (Churchill and the Generals)
- 1981: Celia Johnson and Michael Hordern (All's Well that Ends Well)
- 1982: Ian Richardson (Private Schulz)
- 1983: Ian McKellen (Walter)
- 1984: Alan Bates (An Englishman Abroad)
- 1985: Jean Alexander (Coronation Street)
- 1986: Anna Massey (Hotel du Lac / Sacred hearts) and David Suchet (Blott on the Landscape / A Song for Europe / Freud)
- 1987: Joan Hickson (Miss Marple) and Michael Gambon (The Singing Detective)
- 1988: Miranda Richardson (Sweet As You Are) and Ray McAnally (The Perfect Spy)

Regional Programme Award

- 1975: Oh to be in Ulster (BBC Northern Ireland)
- 1976: A Man Between Three Rivers (Anglia TV)
- 1977: It's No Joke Living in Barnsley (Yorkshire TV)
- 1978: Beneath the Pennines: Pippikin Pot (BBC North)
- 1979: From the Roots came the Wrapper (BBC North West)
- 1980: Lancaster Legend – A Pilot's Story (BBC North)
- 1981: Valentine's Day (Tyne Tees TV)
- 1982: Recipe for Disaster (Television South West)
- 1983: Cavalcade: A Backstage Story (BBC South)
- 1984: I Can Hear you Smile (STV)
- 1985: The Dying Swan (BBC East)
- 1986: Living with CF (BBC Midlands)
- 1987: All Change at Evercreech Junction (BBC West)
- 1988: Paper Kisses (BBC Leeds)

Writer's Award

- 1975: Stan Barstow (South Riding / A Raging Calm / Joby)
- 1976: Ron Downing (A Man Between Three Rivers)
- 1977: Jack Rosenthal
- 1978: Tom Stoppard (Professional Foul)
- 1979: Andrew Birkin (The Lost Boys)
- 1980: Elaine Morgan (Testament of Youth)
- 1981: Peter Ransley (Minor Complications)
- 1982: Jack Pulman (Private Schulz)
- 1983: Alan Bleasdale (Boys from the Blackstuff)
- 1984: Alan Bennett (An Englishman Abroad) and Ken Taylor (The Jewel in the Crown)
- 1985: Alan Plater (On Your Way, Riley / The Beiderbecke Affair)
- 1986: Alan Bennett (The Insurance Man) and Graham Reid (Ties of Blood)
- 1987: Andrew Davies (A Very Peculiar Practice)
- 1988: Bill Nicholson (Life Story / Sweet As You Are)

Technique Award

- 1975: Jimmy Boyers (Anthony and Cleopatra)
- 1976: David Multon (BBC)
- 1977: Vic Finch (LWT)
- 1978: Philip Bonham-Carter (Americans / The Long Search)
- 1979: BBC (The Light Princess)
- 1980: Thames TV (Quincy's Quest)
- 1981: STV (Eternal Spiral)
- 1982: Dave Jervis, Bert Postlethwaite, Dick Coles, Norman Brierley and Peter Ware (Gulliver in Lilliput)
- 1983: LWT (Outside Edge)
- 1984: Bill Millar (The Hot Shoe Show)
- 1985: Robin Lobb / BBC Special Effects team (The Box of Delights)
- 1986: Roger Pratt (Dutch Girls – LWT)
- 1987: John Fyfe and Colin Innes-Hopkins (Fire and Ice – LWT)
- 1988: John Hooper (Cariani and the Courtesans – BBC)

Design Award

- 1975: Fred Pusey
- 1976: David Myerscough-Jones (The Flying Dutchman – BBC)
- 1977: Thames TV (Rock Follies)
- 1978: Roy Stonehouse (Hard Times)
- 1979: Barry Newbery (The Lost Boys)
- 1980: Sally Hulke (Testament of Youth)
- 1981: Andrew Drummond (Blade on a Feather)
- 1982: Tim Harvey (The Borgias)
- 1983: Juanita Waterson (The Barchester Chronicles)
- 1984: Vic Symonds / Alan Pickford (The Jewel in the Crown)
- 1985: Jan Spoczynski (A Month in the Country / Much Ado About Nothing)
- 1986: The Design Team (The Max Headroom Show)
- 1987: The Design Team (The Singing Detective)
- 1988: the design award was spun off into the Craft & Design Awards

Outstanding Achievement – Behind the camera

- 1975: Diana Edwards-Jones
- 1976: John Willis
- 1977: Production team of Sailor
- 1978: John Irvin
- 1979: Christopher Ralling
- 1980: Jonathan Powell
- 1981: Jonathan Miller
- 1982: Innes Lloyd
- 1983: Ronald Neil
- 1984: Margaret Matheson
- 1985: Richard Taylor
- 1986: Edward Barnes
- 1987: Kenith Trodd
- 1988: John Willis

RTS Gold Medal

- 1975: Lord Aylestone
- 1976: Huw Wheldon
- 1977: Cyril Bennett (posthumous), Aubrey Buxton, Charles Curran, Bernard Sendall
- 1978: Geoffrey Cox
- 1979: The Open University
- 1980: Robin Scott
- 1981: John Freeman
- 1982: Hugh Greene
- 1983: Howard Steele
- 1984: William Brown
- 1985: Richard Taylor
- 1986: Production team of Survival
- 1987: Denis Forman, Tony Pilgrim, Bill McMahon
- 1988: David Rose

Outstanding Achievement – In front of camera

- 1975: Ronnie Barker
- 1976: John Cleese
- 1977: Bernard Hepton
- 1978: Huw Wheldon
- 1979: Bryan Magee

Judges Award

- 1984: BBC Micro computer project team
- 1985: Shaun Sutton for the BBC Shakespeare plays
- 1986: Mersey Television for Brookside
- 1987: Ken Westbury and Dennis Potter
- 1988: Betty Willingale

Children's Programme Award

- 1986: Look at Me (ITV)
- 1987: Odysseus (BBC)
- 1988: Bad Boyes (BBC)

The Cyril Bennett Award

- 1977: Lord Grade
- 1978: Huw Wheldon
- 1979: Shaun Sutton
- 1980: Denis Forman
- 1981: Granada TV – Drama Documentary Unit
- 1982: BBC Bristol – Natural History Unit
- 1983: Jeremy Isaacs
- 1984: Paul Fox
- 1985: David Nicholas
- 1986: James Hawthorne
- 1987: Alasdair Milne
- 1988: David Plowright

Popular Arts Award

- 1988: Cilla Black
