= Producers Alliance for Cinema and Television =

The Producers Alliance for Cinema and Television (PACT) is the UK trade association for independent content producers in feature film, television, animation, children's and digital media.

Pact campaigns on issues of relevance to its members, including intellectual property, diversity (Pact's members are invited to sign a voluntary Diversity Pledge), and international issues.

As of 2023, the organisation's Chief Executive is John McVay.
