= John McVay (producer) =

British film and television producer (born 1960)

John McVay (born 1960) is a British film and television producer. As of 2001, he is the Chief Executive of the UK's Producers Alliance for Cinema and Television (Pact). He also chairs the Creative Diversity Network and is the director of the British Television Distributors Association.

He was previously the first director of the Research Centre for Television and Interactivity, based in Glasgow, and has also worked at Scottish Screen and Scottish Broadcast and Film Training.

He was awarded a Royal Television Society Fellowship in 2016, for his "outstanding contribution to the television industry".
