= List of Gogglebox cast members =

The following is a list of cast members of the British reality television programme Gogglebox, and its two spin-off shows, Gogglesprogs and Celebrity Gogglebox.

== Gogglebox (2013–present) ==
=== Current ===
This is a list of the current cast members appearing in the show in order of their first appearance.

Cast members		Series	Year
Siddiqui family (Sid, Umar, Baasit and Raza)		1–present	2013–present
Jenny Newby and Lee Riley		4–present	2014–present
The Malone Family (Tom Sr., Julie, Vanessa and Shaun)		4–present	2014–present
Giles Wood and Mary Killen		5–present	2015–present
Ellie and Izzi Warner		6–present	2015–present
David and Shirley Griffiths		6–present	2015–present
Plummer family (Tremaine, Twaine and Tristan)		8–present (Note: Amira and Amani and the Plummer family also appeared in the Celebrity Gogglebox Black to Front special (series 3, episode 9).)	2016–present
Amira Rota	Iqra	10–12 (Note: Amira originally appeared alongside friend Iqra from series 10 to 12, until Iqra was replaced by Amira's sister Amani.)	2017–2018
Amira Rota	Amani Rota	13–present	2018–present
Worthington family (Alison, George and Helena)		10–present	2017–present
Pete and Sophie Sandiford		10–present	2017–present
Abbie Lynn and Georgia Bell		12–present	2018–present
Sue and Steve Sheehan		14–present	2019–present
Simon and Jane Minty		18–present	2021–present
Ronnie and Annie		18–present	2021–present
Danielle and Daniella		20–present	2022–present
Teresa and Anita		23–present	2024–present
Michael, Sally, Jake and Harry		24–present	2024–present
Andrew and Alfie		26–present	2025–present
Jake and Calum		26–present	2025–present
Sara and Lara		26–present	2025–present
Sarah, Cheé and Andre		26–present	2025–present
Susie and Rosie		26–present	2025–present

=== Former ===
This is a list of former cast members appearing in the show in order of their last appearance.

Cast members		Series	Year
Roisin Kelly and Joe Kyle		19–25	2022–2025
Elaine and Seb		22-23	2023–2024
Stephen Webb	Christopher Steed	1–10	2013–2017
Stephen Webb	Pat Webb†	10–12	2017–2018
Stephen Webb	Daniel Lustig-Webb	13–21	2018–2023
Marcus Luther and Mica Ven		11–20 (Note: Marcus and Mica also appeared in the Celebrity Gogglebox Black to Front special (series 3, episode 9).)	2018–2022
Anne and Ken†		15–19	2020–2022
Baggs family (Terry, Lisa, Joe and George)		16, 18–19	2020–2022
Michael family (Andrew†, Carolyne, Louis, Alex, Katie and Pascal)		1–4, 6–17	2013–2021
Paige Deville and Sally Hayward		14–17	2019–2021
Mary Cook† and Marina Wingrove		8–17	2016–2021
Linda and Pete McGarry†		2–3, 7–16	2013–2014, 2016–2020
Tom Malone Jnr		4–16	2014–2020
Walker family (Chantelle, Monique and Elizabeth)		16	2020
Emma and David		14–15	2019–2020
Woerdenweber family		2–14	2013–2019
John and Beryl		12–14	2018–2019
Sachelle and Shuggy		11–14	2018–2019
Lampard Family (Jackie, Olivia and Grace)		13	2019
Andrew and Fawn		12	2018
Iqra		10–12	2017–2018
George Gilbey†		2–3, 7—11	2013–2014, 2016–2018
Kathy, Cilla and Elvie		11	2018
Bill Hartston and Josef Kollar		2-14	2013-2019
Tapper family (Jonathan, Nikki and Amy)		1–11	2013–2018
Patrice and Savion		9–10	2017
Leon† and June Bernicoff†		1–10	2013–2017
Josh Tapper		1–10	2013–2017
Sandra Martin		1–9	2013–2017
Chanez Martin		8–9	2016–2017
Delaney-Ellwoods family (Jeffrey, Toni, Elizabeth and Jess)		8–9	2016–2017
Johnson-Aley family (Vernal, Shirley and Olivia)		8–9	2016–2017
Sandi Bogle		1–8	2013–2016
Moffatt family (Mark, Betty, Scarlett and Ava-Grace)		3–8	2014–2016
Stephanie and Dominic Parker		1–7	2013–2016
Kate and Graham Bottley		3–7	2014–2016
Manuel family (Charles, Donna and Grant)		7	2016
David Hopkin, Kye Machin and James Smith		4–5	2014–2015
Da Silva family		5	2015
Annie Curthoys and Marc Miller		3	2014
Audrey and Brenda		2	2013
Jeff and Tracey Rawlings		2	2013
Steven Dermott and Michael Wilcock		1–2	2013
Allen family (Charlotte, Gemma and Louise)		1–2	2013
Chris and Colin Staples		1	2013
Gill Gibson and Helen Tait		1	2013

=== Duration ===
Current	Series																				
Current	1 (2013)	2 (2013)	3 (2014)	4 (2014)	5 (2015)	6 (2015)	7 (2016)	8 (2016)	9 (2017)	10 (2017)	11 (2018)	12 (2018)	13 (2019)	14 (2019)	15 (2020)	16 (2020)	17 (2021)	18 (2021)	19 (2022)	20 (2022)	21 (2023)
Stephen Webb																					
Siddiqui family																					
Malone family																					
Jenny and Lee																					
Giles and Mary																					
Ellie and Izzi																					
David and Shirley																					
Plummer family																					
Amira Rota																					
Alison, George and Helena																					
Pete and Sophie																					
Abbie and Georgia																					
Amani Rota																					
Daniel Lustig-Webb																					
Sue and Steve																					
Simon and Jane																					
Ronnie and Annie																					
Roisin and Joe																					
Danielle and Daniella																					
Former	Series																				
Former	1 (2013)	2 (2013)	3 (2014)	4 (2014)	5 (2015)	6 (2015)	7 (2016)	8 (2016)	9 (2017)	10 (2017)	11 (2018)	12 (2018)	13 (2019)	14 (2019)	15 (2020)	16 (2020)	17 (2021)	18 (2021)	19 (2022)	20 (2022)	21 (2023)
Allen family																					
Amy Tapper																					
Jonathan and Nikki Tapper																					
Josh Tapper																					
Chris and Colin Staples																					
Christopher Steed																					
Gill Gibson and Helen Tait																					
Leon and June																					
Michael family																					
Sandy Channer																					
Sandra Martin																					
Steph and Dom Parker																					
Steven Dermott and Michael Wilcock																					
Audrey and Brenda																					
Bill and Josef																					
George Gilbey																					
Jeff and Tracey Rawlings																					
Linda and Pete McGarry																					
Woerdenweber family																					
Annie and Marc																					
Kate and Graham Bottley																					
Moffatt family																					
David, Kye and James																					
Tom Malone Jnr																					
Da Silva family																					
Manuel family																					
McCormick family																					
Mary and Marina																					
Chanchez Martin																					
Delaney-Ellwoods family																					
Johnson-Aley family																					
Patrice and Savion																					
Iqra																					
Kathy, Cilla and Elvie																					
Pat Webb																					
Sachelle and Shuggy																					
Marcus and Mica																					
Andrew and Fawn																					
John and Beryl																					
Lampard family																					
Emma and David																					
Paige and Sally																					
Anne and Ken																					
Walker family																					
Baggs family																					

== Gogglesprogs (2016–2019) ==
A version of the show featuring only children, called Gogglesprogs, launched as a Christmas special on Christmas Day 2015, and was followed by a full-length series, which began airing on 17 June 2016. Two Christmas specials followed, in 2018 and 2019, however no subsequent series nor Christmas specials have followed since.

=== Former ===
This is a list of the former cast members appearing in the show in order of their last appearance.

Cast members	Series	Year
Stephanie and Christina	1–2	2015–2019
Shuaib and Janai	1–2	2015–2019
Molly, William and Beth	1–2	2015–2019
Brooke and Emma	1–2	2015–2019
Ashton, Cari and Darcie	1–2	2016–2019
Macy and Dotty	1–2	2016–2019
Eli and Orin	2	2016–2019
Zac and Lorenzo	–	2018–2019
Brooke and Hayden	–	2018–2019
Ollie and Ollie	–	2019
Romeo, Fraser and Harrison	–	2019
Roque and Willow	–	2019

Cast members	Series	Year
Sam, James and Toby	1–2	2015–2018
Will, Max, Spencer, Harry and Daniel	1–2	2015–2018
Geet and Hanson	1–2	2016–2018
Joel and Roma	2	2017–2018
Jack, Sadie and Declan	2	2017–2018
Valencia and Taya	1–2	2015–2017
Connor and Jacob	1–2	2015–2017
Amelinda and Yoanna	2	2017
Holly and Grace	–	2016
Edie and Teanna	1	2016
Mia and Charlotte	–	2015
Kalim, Anthony and Harry	–	2015

=== Duration ===
Former	Series					
Former	Xmas (2015)	1 (2016)	Xmas (2016)	2 (2017)	Xmas (2018)	Xmas (2019)
Stephanie and Christina						
Shuaib and Janai						
Molly, William and Beth						
Brooke and Emma						
Ashton, Cari and Darcie						
Dotty and Macy						
Eli and Orin						
Zac and Lorenzo						
Brooke and Hayden						
Ollie and Ollie						
Romeo, Fraser and Harrison						
Roque and Willow						
Sam, James and Toby						
Will, Max, Spencer, Harry and Daniel						
Geet and Hanson						
Joel and Roma						
Jack, Sadie and Declan						
Valencia and Taya						
Connor and Jacob						
Amelinda and Yoanna						
Holly and Grace						
Edie and Teanna						
Mia and Charlotte						
Kalim, Anthony and Harry						

== Celebrity Gogglebox (2014–present) ==
This is a list of the celebrities that have appeared on Celebrity Gogglebox, including the original specials and regular series, as well as Stand Up to Cancer, Black to Front, and pride specials.

Cast member(s)		Special(s)	Series	Year(s)
Noel Gallagher, Naomi Campbell and Kate Moss		1	—N/a	2014
Paul O'Grady† and Kathy Burke		1	—N/a	2014
Miranda Hart	Sarah Hadland and Tom Ellis	1	—N/a	2014
Miranda Hart	Diana Margaret Luce and Patricia Hodge	2	—N/a	2015
Jamie Dornan and Nick Frost		2	—N/a	2015
Boy George, Marilyn and Geri Horner		2	—N/a	2015
Sally Bretton, Lee Mack and Bobby Ball†		2	—N/a	2015
Steve Coogan and Anna Friel		3	—N/a	2016
Olly Murs and Niall Horan		3	—N/a	2016
Jamie Vardy		3	1	2016, 2019
Alex Oxlade-Chamberlain and Daniel Sturridge		3	—N/a	2016
Ed Sheeran		4	3	2017, 2021
Big Narstie		4	—N/a	2017
Example		4	1	2017, 2019
Jeremy Corbyn and Jessica Hynes		4	—N/a	2017
Liam, Peggy and Gene Gallagher		4	—N/a	2017
Sharon and Ozzy Osbourne†		4	—N/a	2017
Freddie Flintoff and Jamie Redknapp		4	—N/a	2017
Liam Payne† and Louis Tomlinson		5	—N/a	2018
Dele Alli and Eric Dier		5	—N/a	2018
Peter Crouch, Abbey and Geoff Clancy		5	—N/a	2018
Danny and Dani Dyer		5	6	2018, 2024
Gyles Brandreth	Sheila Hancock	—N/a	1	2019
Gyles Brandreth	Maureen Lipman	—N/a	2–3	2020–2021
Gyles Brandreth	Carol Vorderman	—N/a	4	2022
Gyles Brandreth	Joanna Lumley	—N/a	4–5	2022–2023
Gyles Brandreth	Susie Dent	—N/a	5	2023
Gyles Brandreth	Lulu	—N/a	6	2024
Nick and Liv Grimshaw		—N/a	1–6	2019–2024
Martin and Roman Kemp (Note: Joined in one series 4 episode by Shirlie Kemp.)		—N/a	1–6	2019–2024
Eamonn Holmes and Ruth Langsford		—N/a	1–3	2019–2021
Denise van Outen	Eddie Boxshall	—N/a	1–3	2019–2021
Denise van Outen	Duncan James	—N/a	4–5	2022–2023
Denise van Outen	Johnny Vaughan	—N/a	6	2024
Bez and Shaun Ryder		—N/a	1–6	2019–2024
Sunetra Sarker and Georgia Taylor		—N/a	1–3	2019–2021
Chris Eubank Sr. and Jr.		—N/a	1, 3	2019, 2021
Olly Alexander	Vicki Thornton	—N/a	1	2019
Olly Alexander	MNEK	—N/a	3	2021
Rylan and Linda Clark		—N/a	1–2, 4–6	2019–2020, 2022–2024
Stacey Solomon and Joe Swash		—N/a	1–4, 6	2019–2022, 2024
Emilia Fox	Laurence Fox	—N/a	1	2019
Emilia Fox	Joanna David	—N/a	2	2020
Nicole Appleton	Melanie Blatt	—N/a	1	2019
Nicole Appleton	Gene Gallagher	—N/a	5	2023
Oti Mabuse	Motsi and Phemelo Mabuse	—N/a	1	2019
Oti Mabuse	Bill Bailey	—N/a	4	2022
Rachel Riley and Pasha Kovalev		—N/a	1	2019
Kelly Osbourne, Sammy Barrett-Singh and Fleur		—N/a	1	2019
Stanley Johnson and Georgia Toffolo		—N/a	1	2019
Little Mix (Leigh-Anne, Jesy, Perrie and Jade)		—N/a	1	2019
Jessie J and Jamal Edwards†		—N/a	1	2019
Westlife (Shane, Kian, Nicky and Mark)		—N/a	1	2019
Emily Atack and Kate Robbins		—N/a	1	2019
Rebekah Vardy		—N/a	1	2019
Vicki Thornton		—N/a	1	2019
Chris Ramsey		—N/a	1	2019
Mark Ronson and Serge Pizzorno		—N/a	1	2019
Nicola Stephenson and Lisa Faulkner		—N/a	1	2019
Bananarama (Sara and Keren)		—N/a	1	2019
Loyle Carner and Jean Coyle-Larner		—N/a	1	2019
Chris, Ben and Jack Kamara		—N/a	1	2019
Professor Green		—N/a	1	2019
Jack Whitehall, Michael Whitehall and Hilary Gish		6	—N/a	2019
Yungblud and Jack Saunders		6	—N/a	2019
Steve Pemberton and Reece Shearsmith		6	—N/a	2019
Grayson, Philippa and Flo Perry		6	—N/a	2019
Zoe Ball and Woody Cook (Note: Joined in one series 4 episode and one series 5 episode by Johnny Ball.)		—N/a	2–6	2020–2024
KSI	Craig David	7	—N/a	2020
KSI	S-X	—N/a	2–3	2020–2021
Mo Gilligan and Babatunde Aléshé		7	2–6	2020–2024
Vic Reeves and Jools Holland		—N/a	2–3	2020–2021
Nigel Havers and Denis Lawson		—N/a	2–4	2020–2022
Laura Whitmore and Iain Stirling		—N/a	2–3	2020–2021
Jack McManus and Martine McCutcheon		—N/a	2–3	2020–2021
Nicola Adams and Ella Baig		—N/a	2	2020
Harry and Sandra Redknapp		—N/a	2	2020
Johnny Vegas and Beverley Dixon		—N/a	2	2020
Ashley Roberts and Jamie Theakston		—N/a	2	2020
Robert Rinder and Susanna Reid		—N/a	2	2020
Paul and Daisy May Cooper		—N/a	2	2020
Anita Rani and Bal Singh Nazran		—N/a	2	2020
Pixie Lott and Oliver Cheshire		—N/a	2	2020
Adrian Dunbar, Vicky McClure and Martin Compston		7	—N/a	2020
Victoria Coren and David Mitchell		7	—N/a	2020
John Bishop and Roger Daltrey		7	—N/a	2020
Clare Balding and Alice Arnold		—N/a	3–6	2021–2024
Melanie C and Paul O'Neill		—N/a	3–6	2021–2024
Andi and Miquita Oliver		—N/a	3–6	2021–2024
Micah Richards and Jamie Carragher		—N/a	3–5	2021–2023
Lorraine Kelly and Rosie Smith		—N/a	3–4	2021–2022
Anne-Marie	Sir Tom Jones	—N/a	3	2021
Anne-Marie	Ed Sheeran	—N/a	3	2021
Anne-Marie	Samantha Nicholson	—N/a	4	2022
Clara and Andy Amfo		—N/a	3	2021
Joel Dommett and Hannah Cooper		—N/a	3	2021
Saoirse-Monica Jackson and Jamie-Lee O'Donnell		—N/a	3	2021
Kadeena Cox	Adam Gemili	—N/a	3	2021
Kadeena Cox	Lauren Steadman	—N/a	6	2024
Jonathan, Honey and Harvey Ross, and Zane Saz		—N/a	3	2021
Jeremy Vine and Snoochie Shy		—N/a	3	2021
Judi Love and Charlene White		—N/a	3 (Note: Appeared in series 3 only in episode 9, the Black to Front special.)–6	2021–2024
Ashley and Jordan Banjo and Perri Kiely		—N/a	3	2021
Tia Kofi	Tayce	—N/a	3	2021
Tia Kofi	Lawrence Chaney	—N/a	4 (Note: Appeared in series 4 only in episode 4, the pride special.)	2022
Mr Motivator and Rustie Lee		—N/a	3	2021
Wretch 32 and Ghetts		—N/a	3	2021
Jourdan and Anton Dunn		—N/a	3	2021
Rudolph Walker and Tameka Empson		—N/a	3	2021
Fatima Timbo and Kimmy Soko		—N/a	3	2021
Michael Dapaah and Eddie Kadi		—N/a	3	2021
Tinie Tempah and Lost Girl		—N/a	3	2021
Maya Jama and Munya Chawawa		—N/a	3	2021
Michael Sheen and Anna Lundberg		8	—N/a	2021
Aisling Bea and Rob Delaney		8	—N/a	2021
Matt and Diana Williams Lucas		8	—N/a	2021
Graham Norton and Michelle Visage		8	—N/a	2021
Suranne Jones and Adam James		8	—N/a	2021
Aitch and Kalvin Phillips		8	—N/a	2021
Sam Ryder and Scott Mills		—N/a	4–5	2022–2023
Guz Khan and Jamali Maddix		—N/a	4–5	2022–2023
Fearne Cotton and Gok Wan		—N/a	4–6	2022–2024
Jon Richardson and Lucy Beaumont		—N/a	4–5	2022–2023
Fred Sirieix and Fruitcake		—N/a	4	2022
Sophie Ellis-Bextor	Janet Ellis	—N/a	4	2022
Sophie Ellis-Bextor	Richard Jones	—N/a	4	2022
Johannes Radebe and John Whaite		—N/a	4	2022
Big Zuu, Tubsey and Hyder		—N/a	4–5	2022–2023
Rob Beckett and Tom Allen		—N/a	4–6	2022–2024
Paul Sinha and Olly Levy		—N/a	4–5	2022–2023
Anna Richardson and Charles Martin		—N/a	4	2022
Craig Revel Horwood and Ben Goddard		—N/a	4	2022
Lolly Adefope and Mae Martin		—N/a	4	2022
Helen and Kate Richardson-Walsh		—N/a	4	2022
Bimini and Self Esteem		—N/a	4	2022
Claire Richards, Faye Tozer and Ian "H" Watkins		—N/a	4	2022
Kit Connor, Yasmin Finney, William Gao and Joe Locke		—N/a	4	2022
Matt and Emma Willis		—N/a	4	2022
Mel B	Ruby Wax	9	—N/a	2022
Mel B	Phoenix Brown	—N/a	6	2024
Charlotte Church and Luke Evans		9	—N/a	2022
Tom Daley and Dustin Lance Black		9	—N/a	2022
Gordon and Tilly Ramsey		9	—N/a	2022
Davina McCall and Michael Douglas		—N/a	5	2023
Jane McDonald and Sue Ravey		—N/a	5–6	2023–2024
Chris Packham and Megan McCubbin		—N/a	5–6	2023–2024
Katherine Ryan and Bobby Kootstra		—N/a	5	2023
Tom and Martin Grennan		—N/a	5	2023
Stephen and Anita Mangan		—N/a	5–6	2023–2024
Munroe Bergdorf and Leomie Anderson		—N/a	5	2023
Adam Lambert and Beverley Knight		—N/a	5	2023
Ricky Tomlinson and Sue Johnston		—N/a	5–6	2023–2024
Richie Anderson and Ellie Simmonds		—N/a	5–6	2023–2024
Gregg Wallace and Greg James		—N/a	5	2023
N-Dubz (Tulisa, Dappy and Fazer)		—N/a	5	2023
Deborah Meaden and Peter Jones		—N/a	5	2023
Rita and Elena Ora		—N/a	5	2023
Jeff and Bobby Brazier		10	6	2023–2024
Jennifer Saunders and Beattie Edmondson		10	6	2023–2024
Richard Ayoade and Bob Mortimer		10	—N/a	2023
Harry Hill and Tim Vine		10	—N/a	2023
Nicole Scherzinger and Thom Evans		10	—N/a	2023
Stephen Graham, Hannah Walters, Grace and Alfie		10	—N/a	2023
Rio Ferdinand and Kate Wright		—N/a	6	2024
Annie Mac and Sara Cox		—N/a	6	2024
Fearne Cotton and Georgia Tennant		—N/a	7	2025
Georgia and David Tennant		11	—N/a	2025
