= Religion for Atheists =

2012 book by Alain de Botton

- Author: Alain de Botton
- Audio read by: Kris Dyer
- Language: English
- Subject: Atheism, Religious philosophy
- Published: 2012
- Media type: Print (hardback & paperback)
- Pages: 320
- Dewey Decimal: 200
- LC Class: BL2776

Religion for Atheists: A non-believer's guide to the uses of religion is a book by Alain de Botton published in 2012. It argues that while supernatural claims made by religion are false, some aspects of religion are still useful and can be applied in secular life and society. Religion for Atheists was published in the UK in hardback edition by Hamish Hamilton, and in the US by Pantheon. Religion for Atheists was a New York Times non-fiction bestseller, and has been widely reviewed, with mixed results.

== Content ==
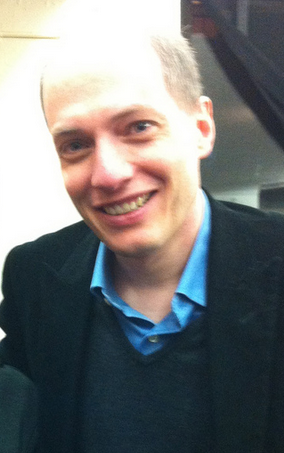
Alain de Botton, c. 2012

Religion for Atheists has a general format in which de Botton describes a problem in society, discusses how religions (particularly Christianity, Judaism and Buddhism) have attempted to solve this problem, and proposes secular alternatives. Religion for Atheists draws on the work of the 19th century philosophers Auguste Comte, Matthew Arnold and John Stuart Mill. Religion for Atheists particularly pays attention to the way religions draw people's minds to ideas through annual ceremonies and rituals such as Christmas or the Day of Atonement. Religion for Atheists asserts that religions know that people are fundamentally children, in need of comforting and repeated guidance on how to live. The book is divided into ten chapters: Wisdom without Doctrine, Community, Kindness, Education, Tenderness, Pessimism, Perspective, Art, Architecture and Institutions. In an interview with New Scientist, de Botton stated his aim for atheists reading the book: "I want to make sure atheists are deriving some of the benefits of religion."

The chapter on "Kindness" discusses the tensions between libertarianism and paternalism. It argues that freedom has become vital in Western political thinking, and discusses suspicion of the idea that the state should talk about how we should behave to each other. De Botton contrasts this with religions, which he describes as having ambitious ideals about how people should treat each other. He suggests that religious ethics grew out of pragmatic needs, and that, because they were key to our survival, it became important to protect them by pretending that they were divinely inspired. He sums up by saying that people simply have to be reminded that "the most mature and reasonable parts of us" (p. 80) want us to live this way. De Botton suggests the example of the Scrovegni Chapel, which has paintings of the "cardinal virtues" and their corresponding vices. People sitting in the church would think about their own relationships to these virtues and vices while they sat under a painting of God. De Botton suggests that advertising for values should be displayed in public spaces.

The chapter on "Pessimism" asserts that modern society, with its continual message of progress and improvement, seems to promise permanent happiness, but that we are still vulnerable to heartbreak and despair, even as our ancestors were. De Botton argues that religious pessimism allows religious people to be grateful for small successes, whereas "the secular world is not well versed in the art of gratitude" (p. 188).

In the "Institutions" chapter, De Botton describes organised religions as being efficient at spreading their message, having financial clout and enacting social change, and compares them to corporations.

== Publication ==
Religion for Atheists was published in the UK in hardback edition by Hamish Hamilton (later also by its parent Penguin), and in the US by Pantheon and Vintage International. A Greek translation has been published by Pataki, and a Swedish translation has been published by Brombergs.

== Reception ==
Critical reception of the book has been mixed. It was the most-reviewed book of the week in January 2012, according to The Bookseller. David Brooks finds that the book makes atheism "kind of boring", like a "spiritual handicap". Terry Eagleton describes the book as an attempt to "hijack other people's beliefs, empty them of content and redeploy them in the name of moral order, social consensus and aesthetic pleasure". Angus Wood says that de Botton's proposed solutions feel "trite or feel crassly commercial", and that transferring the authoritarian methods of religion to a secular world looks "like indoctrination". Martha Gill, after reading Religion for Atheists, feels that "as a spiritual guide, de Botton offers as much opportunity for growth as a hard-boiled egg". Joe Winkler recommends A.C. Grayling's The Good Book, The Joys of Secularism, and Bertrand Russell's A Free Man's Worship over this book. Winkler finds the omission of positive psychology confusing in the book, and criticises de Botton's assumption that "because the mechanics used in a religious setting work, and have worked for thousands of years, they will work in a secular setting", and describes this assumption as naive at best and "slightly totalitarian" at worst. Despite his criticisms, Winkler recommends Religion for Atheists because he finds the book eloquent and thought-provoking. Christopher Hirst writes of the book: "De Botton has reduced religion to a mechanism", and describes the tone of the book as "bossy, but readable". James Croft describes the book as having a lack of balance, and under-valuing the achievements of humanity.

Barney Zwartz says "De Botton selects areas of need – community, kindness, education, tenderness, perspective, architecture and art – and draws out detailed, practical lessons." José Teodoro suggests the book is "subtly condescending in the way it demands that everything in our shared environment constantly remind us that we're not alone in our anxieties and disappointments". The Economist, in a comparison with Roger Scruton's The Face of God, writes that de Botton "often stretches a good idea beyond its elastic limit". John Armstrong regards this book as not being part of 'militant Atheism', not arguing whether religion is true or not, but looking at its effects in people's daily lives. Stephen Cave, writing for the Financial Times, regards a theme of Religion for Atheists to be "we are less grown-up than liberal societies assume we are and frequently in need of guidance, reassurance and tenderness". Richard Holloway, writing for the Literary Review, notes that when examining the purpose of religion in life, de Botton "rethinks the nature and purpose of higher education and national cultural policy" Holloway felt that the audience of the book is the mass of "uneasy believers", whom he argues will likely "welcome it like a well of water in a dry place".

Marc Mohan suggests that an "ideal reader" of this book would be a religious person who doubts, but is hesitant to stop being religious because they fear that a life without religion is a life without ethics. The Telegraph's Tom Payne writes that the author continues from Ovid's assertion on the utility of gods: "It's useful that there are gods, and that's why we believe in them". According to Payne, de Botton argues that religion provides useful boundaries, in addition to inspiring a sense of awe. Payne praises de Botton's prose and charm, but notes that de Botton seems to find libertarianism distasteful. Payne describes the book as being both prescriptive and optimistic, but sums it up in the book's central premise – the hope that religion can be made to "really suit us". Charles Moore, writing for The Telegraph, states that de Botton's purpose in the book is to study religions and learn from them. Moore states that de Botton "has an instinctively religious grasp of the power of paradox" in that the concept of original sin is depicted in the book as "comforting". Moore suggests that de Botton knows that his suggested secular solutions to the problems of life are "mostly a bit silly", and notes that while de Botton discusses failed attempts at secular religion, like August De Comte's, de Botton "does not seem to ask himself why" they failed. For Moore, religious "uses" come from the "truth" at the heart of religions, and de Botton does not recognise this.

When published in the United States, the book placed on the New York Times best-seller list for hardcover non-fiction.

The reviewer for Bookmarks notes that critics have considered de Botton to be closer to C.S. Lewis and Augustine in his views, rather than the atheists Richard Dawkins and Sam Harris, and that de Botton seems to delight in being subversive in Religion for Atheists, giving the book three stars out of five. A.N. Wilson, who had been an atheist but converted to Christianity, criticized first the amount of illustrations and blank pages in the book. Wilson sums up de Botton's argument as being that religion is too serious to be confined to the General Synod, and describes this argument as attractive – although noting that the 'Education' chapter is the least convincing. Still, Wilson is glad for the optimism in the book. An early review by Kirkus suggests that de Botton's message is that religions take care of two important needs which secular society has not been able to – the need for community and the need for consolation in the face of life's problems.

The reviewer describes de Botton's examples from religions as being "cherry-pick[ed]", and states that de Botton's secular alternatives are less than persuasive, and "insulting". The reviewer notes that de Botton discounts the achievements of civic culture such as libraries, and regards it as a poorer work than de Botton's The Pleasures and Sorrows of Work and The Architecture of Happiness. Jeremy Biles considers de Botton's goal to be to keep philosophy in everyday life. Biles compares Religion for Atheists unfavorably to de Botton's The Consolations of Philosophy, saying that Religion for Atheists seems at times "willfully blind" to aspects of reality, describing the book as a "hopeful fantasy". Biles criticizes the generalizations in the book, and de Botton failing to address how "politics and power" keep the dogmatic parts of religion together with the parts of religion de Botton says should be emulated in a secular fashion. James DeRoche, writing for Library Journal, states that many of de Botton's benefits of religion may have escaped atheists' view before, although religious people might take "some of [the book] for granted". It is described as a book that will promote discussion between atheists and religious people. The reviewer for the Journal of Ecumenical Studies recommends Faitheist: How an Atheist Found Common Ground with the Religious over Religion for Atheists, criticizing Religion for Atheists for not providing citations for its quotes, and describes the book as a "glib and finally unconvincing proposal".

== See also ==
- The School of Life, a project by Alain de Botton which aims to offer instruction on how to lead a fulfilled life.
