= The Singh Twins =

British sibling artists

The Singh Twins (twin sisters Amrit Singh MBE and Rabindra Kaur Singh MBE) are British artists who work together on their artworks. Their work draws on both traditional Indian (in particular, Sikh) tradition, Western medieval illuminated manuscripts and contemporary Western culture, often 'pop culture'. Their work has been shown in galleries and museums such as the National Portrait Gallery in London. Both sisters were conferred with the Most Excellent Order of the British Empire (MBE) in 2011.

== Early life ==
Twin sisters Amrit and Rabindra Kaur Singh are British artists of Sikh heritage. They were born in Richmond, Surrey, and raised in Birkenhead. They were the only non-Catholics to attend their Catholic convent school, Holt Hill Convent. In the mid-1980s to 1991 they studied art together at University College, Chester, followed by Manchester University.

== Work ==
They combine traditions from both Eastern and Western art to make provocative and sharply political work.

The sisters' work is always credited to The Singh Twins, even if the sisters have worked alone on a piece. The Singh Twins work from their studio near Liverpool, which is next to the family home they share with their extended family.

The Singh Twins' work is influenced by Indian miniature paintings, but deals with British contemporary culture, as well as topics such as globalisation and migration.

In 2002, their work was the subject of an exhibition at the National Gallery of Modern Art in New Delhi, making them only the second British-born artists, after Henry Moore, to be accorded such an honour.

In 2009 their work was the subject of an exhibition, "The Singh Twins: Art in Motion" at Leamington Spa Art Gallery. The following year the National Portrait Gallery featured 27 of their works as part of an exhibition, and Sunderland Museum and Winter Gardens held a retrospective of the previous two decades' worth of their work.

In 2011, the sisters were conferred with the Most Excellent Order of the British Empire (MBE) by Queen Elizabeth II for their ‘services to the Indian miniature tradition of painting within Contemporary Art’. The sisters' other achievements and awards include the UK Asian Achievers Awards for Media, Arts and Culture, three honorary doctorates, and Honorary Citizenships of Liverpool.

In 2018 they curated the ‘Slaves of Fashion’ exhibition at the Walker Art Gallery in Liverpool.

In 2020 they were featured in Grayson's Art Club, hosted by Grayson Perry on Channel 4, and a work of theirs is in the accompanying exhibition at Manchester Art Gallery. Perry said of the twins, whose work he admires: 'They combine traditions from both Eastern and Western art to make provocative and sharply political work.'

== See also ==
- Sikh art
- Sikh painting
