= Philippa Perry =

British psychotherapist and author (born 1957)

Philippa, Lady Perry
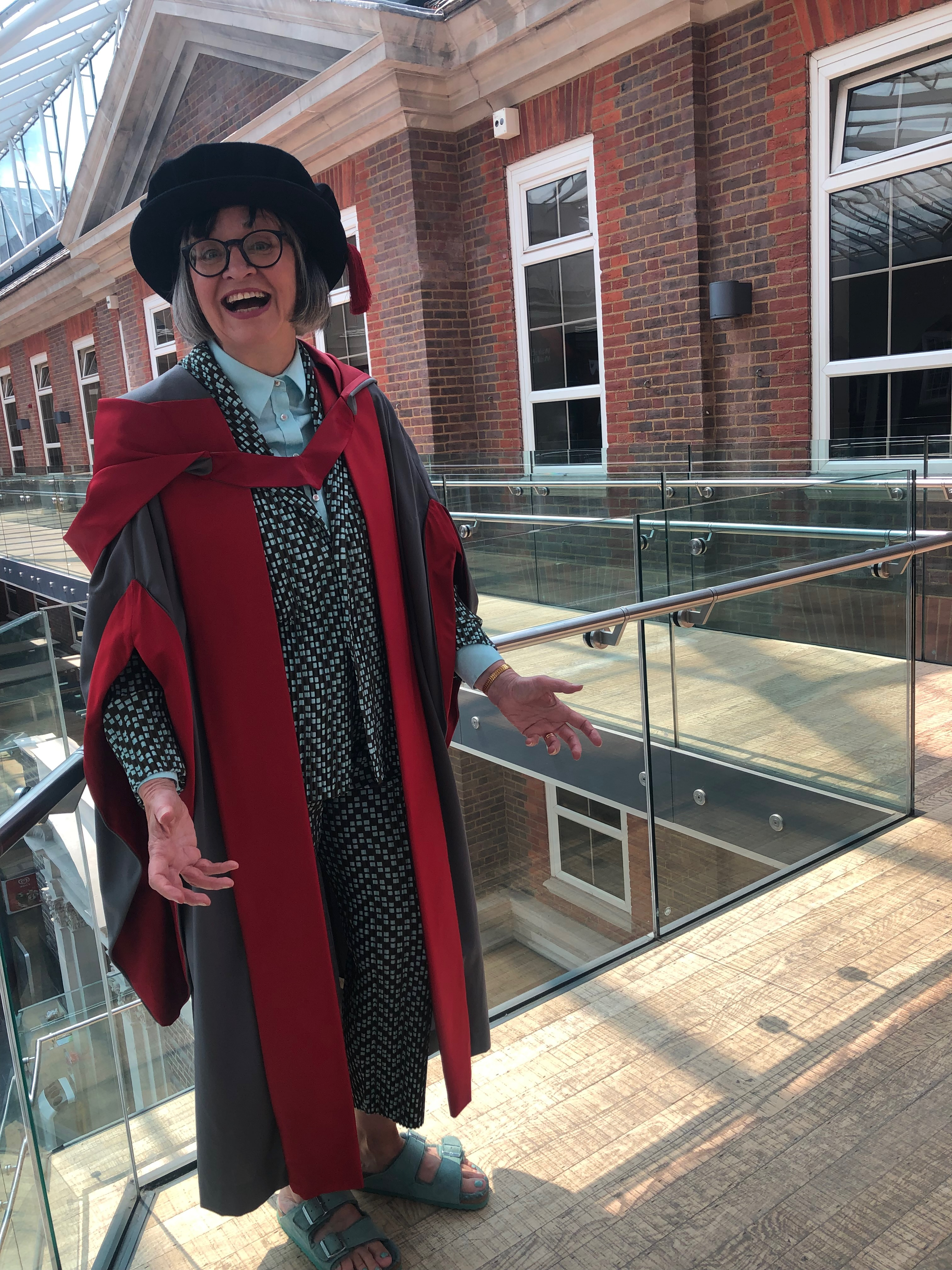
- Born: Philippa Fairclough; 1 November 1957 (age 69); Warrington, Cheshire, England
- Education: Middlesex Polytechnic
- Occupation: Artist
- Employer(s): Samaritans; The School of Life; Psychologies
- Spouse: Grayson Perry
- Children: Flo Perry

Philippa, Lady Perry (née Fairclough; born 1 November 1957), is an English psychotherapist, artist, writer, television presenter and personality. She has written the graphic novel Couch Fiction: A Graphic Tale of Psychotherapy (2010) books How to Stay Sane (2012), The Book You Wish Your Parents Had Read (and Your Children Will be Glad That You Did) (2019), The Book You Want Everyone You Love* To Read *(and maybe a few you don't) (2023) and the crime novel Shrink Solves Murder (2026).

== Early life ==
Lady Perry was born in Warrington, Cheshire. Her mother's family owned a cotton mill and her father inherited a civil engineering company and a farm. She was educated at Abbots Bromley School for Girls and at a Swiss finishing school where she learnt to ski.

Perry worked as a litigation clerk, an enquiry agent, and at McDonald's. She went to Middlesex Polytechnic where she gained a degree in Fine Art as a mature student.

== Work ==
In 1985, Perry trained and volunteered for the British and Irish mental health charity Samaritans, after which she trained as a psychotherapist, and was a member of the UK Association of Humanistic Psychology Practitioners. Perry worked in the mental health field for 20 years, 10 in private practice, before being published. From 2010 she spent time on the faculty of The School of Life, but she subsequently discontinued this.

Perry had a regular column about psychotherapy in Psychologies women's magazine for two years. In September 2013 she became Red Magazine's agony aunt. She also works as a freelance journalist specialising in psychology and was an occasional presenter for The Culture Show on BBC Two. Perry has presented various documentaries including: Sex, Lies and Lovebites: The Agony Aunt Story (BBC Four); Being Bipolar (Channel 4); The Truth About Children Who Lie (BBC Radio 4); How to be a Surrealist (BBC 4); and The Great British Sex Survey (Channel 4).

In 2010 the academic publisher Palgrave Macmillan published Perry's book, Couch Fiction: A Graphic Tale of Psychotherapy. It is a graphic novel that tells a tale of a psychotherapist and her client, from both their perspectives. Underneath the graphic novel boxes, Perry takes the position of commentator and provides footnotes on what might be going on between them and what theories the therapist is drawing on or should be drawing on. There is an afterword by Andrew Samuels. The book was positively reviewed by newspapers and academic journals.

Perry appeared on BBC Radio 4's The Museum of Curiosity in November 2019. Her hypothetical donation to this imaginary museum was "A swarm of fruit flies".

In 2019, Perry and her family appeared on Channel 4's 2019 Celebrity Gogglebox Stand Up To Cancer special. In 2021, Perry appeared on the Celebrity Great British Bake Off special, also for Stand Up to Cancer.

In 2020, Perry co-presented Grayson's Art Club with her husband. The series had over a million viewers a week. It ran to a third series.

In 2023, Perry was awarded an honorary doctorate degree by her alma mater, Middlesex University.

Perry is a monthly agony aunt for Red magazine and, between June 2021 and 2025, wrote for The Observer, until its sale to Tortoise Media. Perry joined other former Observer writers in moving to the online publication The Nerve. In 2026, she released the crime novel Shrink Solves Murder.

== Books ==
- Couch Fiction: a Graphic Tale of psychotherapy. Palgrave Macmillan, 2010. With an afterword by Andrew Samuels.
- How to Stay Sane. The School of Life Self Help Series. Pan Macmillan, 2012. Edited by Alain de Botton.
- The Book You Wish Your Parents Had Read (and Your Children Will be Glad That You Did). London: Penguin, 2019.
- The Book You Want Everyone You Love* To Read *and maybe a few don't Cornerstone Press, 2023.
- Shrink Solves Murder Cornerstone Press, 2026.

== Personal life ==
She is married to the artist Sir Grayson Perry, and they have a daughter, Flo Perry, born in 1992. The Perrys live in London. She has often been asked what it is like being married to a transvestite and says, "Being the wife of a trannie is great, he always makes me look fantastic". When asked the same question by a Buckingham Palace press officer when the Perrys went to a reception there in 2005, she said, "As obsessions go, it's better than football".
