= Grayson's Art Club =

British television series

Grayson's Art Club is a Channel 4 television documentary series focused on the COVID-19 pandemic and the lockdown. It was hosted by artist Grayson Perry and his wife Philippa Perry. Its first broadcast was during the early months of the COVID-19 pandemic, between 27 April and 1 June 2020.

== Format ==
In the context of the coronavirus pandemic and the resulting lockdown measures, Perry asked viewers to submit artworks on a given theme each week. Perry selected several pieces each week to be part of an exhibition to be held after the lockdown ended, and spoke via video link to the creators. Both Perry and his wife were also filmed using mainly static cameras placed around the studio making artworks for the exhibition. In addition, Perry conducted remote interviews with artists including Maggi Hambling, Antony Gormley, and The Singh Twins, and with celebrities with artistic hobbies, including Noel Fielding, Jessica Hynes, and Jim Moir.

Pieces from the celebrities and professional artists were also to be included in the exhibition, which was to be held at Manchester Art Gallery from 25 November 2020 – 18 April 2021. A further exhibition was held at Midlands Art Centre, Birmingham in 2023.

By 22 May 2020, part-way through the series, the programme had already received over 10,000 artwork submissions. The first series had over a million viewers a week.

The music for the series was by Alexander Parsons and is available to buy in digital formats only.

Writing about the first series in The Guardian, Claire Armitstead noted "Grayson's Art Club was conceived as a quickfire reaction to the pandemic, with Grayson repeatedly emphasising the creative potential of boredom and confinement. Perry said of the art 'We're saying the finished thing doesn't have to be good, but the process has to be genuine. And it has to be heartfelt and enjoyable. We're not saying make art like a professional, we're saying get stuck in and lose yourself a while in it ... I am trying to democratise art, but I'm not saying it means a drop in quality. It just means upping the accessibility and entertainment. Entertainment and humour are often denigrated, but they take just as much skill as the so-called intellectual level of high culture'."

== Series and episodes ==
=== Series 1 ===
Series 1 comprised six one-hour weekly episodes:

1. Portraits, featuring artist Chantal Joffe, who painted a self portrait in her studio; comedian (and guest judge) Joe Lycett, who painted a portrait of England's Chief Medical Officer Chris Whitty (with the caption 'Wash your filthy pig hands'); and presenter Keith Lemon, who made a iPad portrait of Pharrell Williams. Perry worked on a portrait of his wife Philippa which he then painted on to a large ceramic plate, and started work on a large ceramic 'protective figure' of his totem, Alan Measles, work on which went on through all six episodes. The public's artworks included a ceramic bust of Chris Whitty and a painting of a drag queen, Aquaria by Miranda Noszkiewicz. First broadcast Monday 27 April 2020.
2. Animals, featuring artist Dame Maggi Hambling, who painted a magnolia surrounded by the virus, titled 'April 2020', in her studio; comedian and television presenter (and guest judge) Harry Hill, who carved a wooden dog called Soloman; and actor and comedian Noel Fielding, who made a pastel crayon drawing of 'Acid Mouse and a sexy cooking apple'. Perry made a ceramic 'plague cat covered in decorative boils and pustules' based on an Islamic incense burner, and continued work on his protective figure of Alan Measles. Philippa made a ceramic cat based on the work of Aldo Londi for Bitossi. Both the Perrys' works were inspired by their cat, Kevin, who was in the studio as they worked. The public's artworks included an embroidery of penguins at an aquarium, some wire garden birds, and a photograph by frontline nurse Hannah Grace Deller of a dog show. First broadcast Monday 4 May 2020.
3. Fantasy, featuring sculptor Sir Antony Gormley, who made a dot painting with crude oil in his studio; a visit to the studio of artist Raqib Shaw; actor (and guest judge) Jessica Hynes, who made a decorated lampshade; and actor and comedian Noel Fielding (again), who this time made a cardboard fantasy cocktail party, with guests including The Beatles, Grace Jones, Andy Warhol and Jean-Michel Basquiat. Perry worked on an albarello, decorated with 'fears and imaginings about the situation we're in', including Alan Measles, Perry's alter ego Claire, and Chris Whitty, and Philippa made a ceramic bowl based on the television series A Place in the Sun. The public's artworks included a painted pregnant belly and modelled cartoon figurines. First broadcast Monday 11 May 2020.
4. View from your window, featuring artist Jeremy Deller, who made a 'Thank God For Immigrants' poster; comedian (and guest judge) Jim Moir, who painted UK birds, including a bearded tit, using oil sticks; and comedian Lolly Adefope, who painted an abstract view 'then no-one can say it's wrong or bad'. Perry worked on a slab-built plant holder based on his house, with a miniature poster of Chris Whitty on the side, and Philippa made a bowl with a view from the studio, including all the tv recording wires and equipment, and a cameraman outside the window. The public's artworks included a window into a fridge, a drawing by a blind artist, and a painting of council refuse bins, one with the slogan 'Nuts about life' written on the side. First broadcast Monday 18 May 2020.
5. Home, featuring artist David Shrigley, who drew a comic drawing 'I'm so lucky'; comedian (and guest judge) Jenny Eclair, who drew an oil pastel and wax crayon drawing of her living room sofa; actor and comedian Noel Fielding (his third appearance), who built a comedy club in his garden shed with a painted audience (with a MC appearance by Rich Fulcher); and television presenter Kevin McCloud, who built a model dream home. Perry worked on a Covid-inspired tea towel he designed on his computer (featuring Chris Whitty), and Philippa made a bowl based on their daughter Flo's flatshare. The public's artworks included a drawing of a caravan, an installation of 'Barbie in lockdown', and a photo collage of a family in their living room, the parents in Gucci and the three brothers present. First broadcast Monday 25 May 2020.
6. Britain, featuring artists The Singh Twins, who made a digital artwork based on St George and the dragon that paid tribute to the NHS; photographer Martin Parr, who photographed socially-distanced queues; and actor and presenter Liza Tarbuck, who made a cloth UK suspended in a mosaic-decorated box. NHS nurse Hannah Grace Deller, whose Marin Parresque photo of a dog show had been featured in the second episode, was commissioned by the programme to take photos at her workplace, St Mary's Hospital in London. Alex Robinson, whose cartoon figurines were featured in the third episode, made an Alan Measles and a Kevin the cat for the Perrys. Perry finished his 'protective spirit' Alan Measles, and made a flagon decorated with scenes of Britain under COVID-19, including the Queen and Chris Whitty, while Philippa made a set of flowerpots decorated with quotes from the first five episodes of the series. The public's artworks included a street scene of people clapping for the NHS, and a decorated cast of a radiotherapy mask. The series ended with a virtual drinks party for the celebrity artists, who talked about what making the art had meant for them. First broadcast Monday 1 June 2020.

Well, here we are at the end of Art Club. And what have I learned? We've painted a strange panel-picture of Britain, now. And I've, I am actually feeling quite hopeful. You know, because I think that I've seen a generous side of Britain, I've seen a tolerant side of Britain, I've seen a vulnerable side of Britain. These are all good qualities. They're great qualities for making art, and they're great qualities for being citizens of the future. — Spoken by Grayson Perry at the end of the final Grayson's Art Club programme.

These six episodes were followed on 4 December 2020 by a one-hour follow-up episode, Grayson's Art Club: The Exhibition, featuring the post-lockdown preparations for the exhibition of the selected Art Club works at Manchester Art Gallery. The preparations were interrupted by the imposing of the second lockdown on 5 November 2020, which was lifted on 2 December. The date of the exhibition has not yet been settled due to the ongoing nature of the pandemic.

On 4 December 2020 Perry tweeted that "Art Club will be back in the New Year".

=== Series 2 ===
On 4 January 2021 England entered its third lockdown period. A preliminary hour-long programme, Grayson's Art Club: Get Creating was broadcast on Sunday 31 January 2021, recapping what had happened in the previous series and giving the six themes for the second series, for which artwork was requested from the public:

1. Family featuring Yinka Ilori and Boy George
2. Nature featuring Andy Goldsworthy, Holly Walsh and Banksy
3. Food featuring Rose Wylie, Lucy Sparrow, Sue Perkins and Nigella Lawson
4. Dreams featuring Johnny Vegas and Frank Bowling.
5. Work featuring Jane Seymour and Ryan Gander
6. Travel featuring Derren Brown and Alex Horne

The artworks selected throughout the series were presented at the exhibition at Bristol Museum & Art Gallery from 4 December 2021 to 4 September 2022. A follow-up episode Grayson's Art Club: An Exhibition for Britain was broadcast on Friday 10 December 2021.

Artworks can only be submitted via the Grayson's Art Club website.

=== Series 3 ===
Series 3 began on Friday 18 March 2022 and due to the ending of Covid-19 restrictions, guests were permitted to enter Perry's studio. The 6 themes were announced in January earlier that year, once again inviting the public to send in their artwork for an exhibition. The show introduced a new segment where Philippa Perry met with an artist or artistic project of her choice per episode.

1. Love featuring Bill Bailey and Ai Weiwei
2. Heroes & Heroines featuring Jo Brand and Frank Quitely
3. Normal Life featuring Joe Wilkinson and Cornelia Parker
4. Inside My Head featuring Mawaan Rizwan and Heather Phillipson
5. Holidays featuring Katy Wix and Denzil Forrester
6. The Future featuring Joe Lycett and Conrad Shawcross

The artworks selected throughout the series were presented at the exhibition at the MAC, Birmingham from 2 December 2022 to 25 June 2023. A follow-up episode Grayson's Art Club: The Exhibition was broadcast on Friday 2 December 2022.

=== Specials ===
To celebrate Elizabeth II's Platinum Jubilee, the first special episode was broadcast on Wednesday 25 May 2022. The topic and episode title was "Queen's Jubilee Special" with guests Prue Leith, Harry Hill, and Hew Locke.

== Reception and accolades ==
Writing about the first series, Alex Marshall of the New York Times said that the programme produced 'a charming and occasionally bizarre portrait of Britain's preoccupations during the crisis.' Hettie Judah wrote in inews that 'I had hoped to be entertained by this show: I had not expected to be so moved.'

The first series of the show was nominated for several awards:

- Nominated and shortlisted for in Arts, Grierson Awards 2020
- Nominated – Creativity in Crisis, 2020 Edinburgh International Television Festival Awards
- Nominated (Special Mention) – TV Performing Arts, Prix Italia 2020
