= Martin Heron =

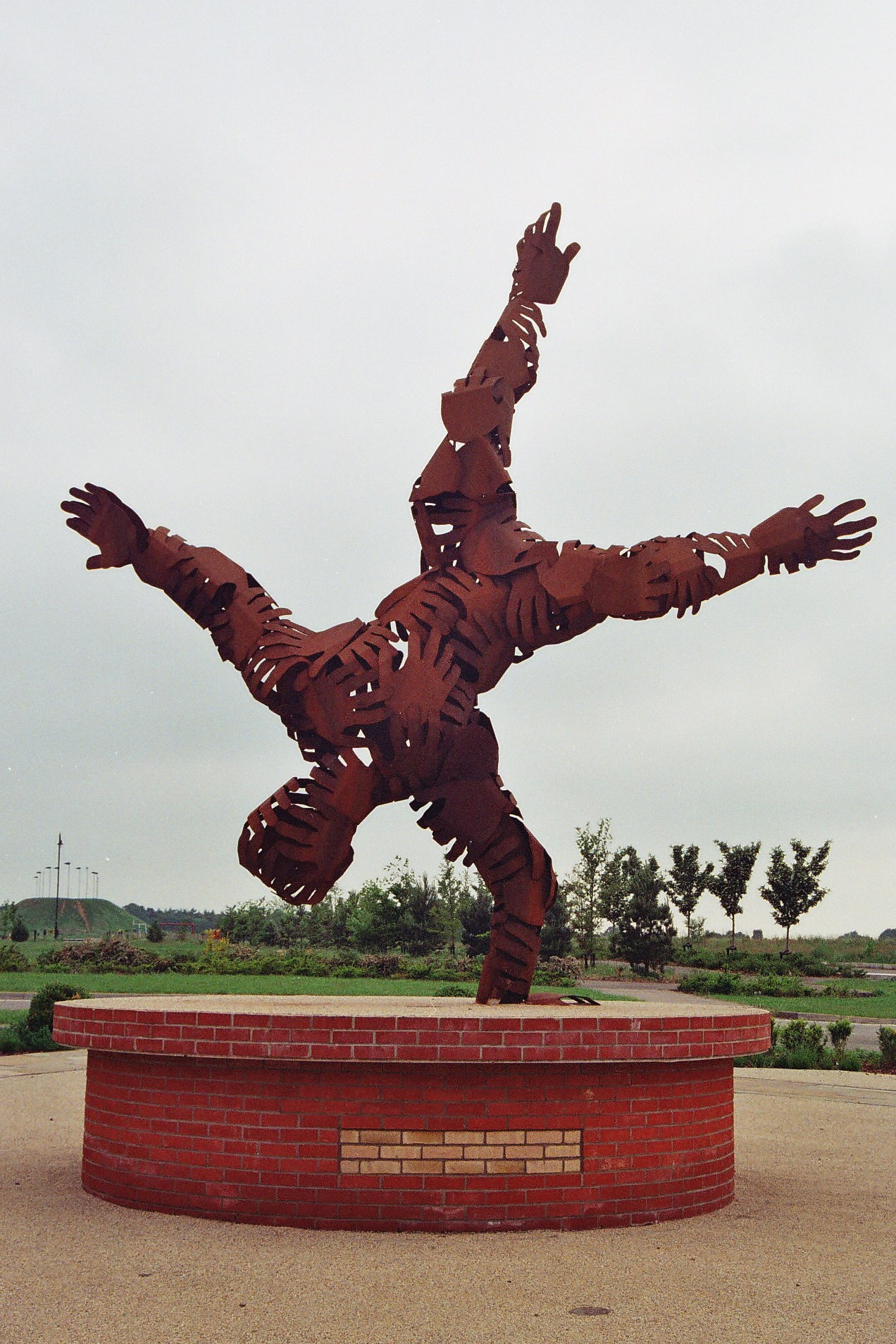
Heron's Handstanding (2006) stands by primary school on the Ravenswood housing estate in Ipswich, Suffolk.

Martin Heron is a sculptor from Northern Ireland working with steel. He is a member of the Royal British Society of Sculptors and The London Group. His art is found outdoors in public places in Northern Ireland. His sculpture "For the Love of Emer" was Armagh City's first commission public artwork. It is a depiction of legendary Irish hero Cú Chulainn balancing on a 20-foot pole. His piece, Handstanding, is outside a public school in Ravenswood, Ipswich. Another sculpture group carved from tree trunks is found along the Irwell Sculpture Trail.

== Notable commissions ==
- Where Dreams Go, Strabane District Council, County Tyrone, Northern Ireland, 2007–08
- Handstanding, Ipswich Borough Council, Ravenswood, Ipswich, 2006
- Ascent Terrifique & Reach stainless steel sculptures, Home Zone Project, Hull City Council, Albany Street Kingston upon Hull, 2005
- Afloat, stainless steel sculpture, Groundwork Stoke-on-Trent, Westport Lake, Tunstall, Stoke-on-Trent, 2005
- Chariot stainless steel sculpture, commissioned for ASDA, ASDA superstore, Thurmaston, Leicestershire, 2003
