= Grayson Perry: All Man =

Television series

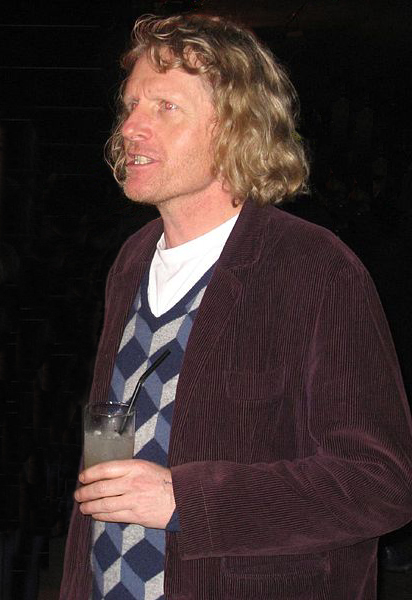
- Grayson Perry
- Created by: Grayson Perry
- Presented by: Grayson Perry
- Country of origin: United Kingdom
- No. of seasons: 1
- No. of episodes: 3

Original release
- Network: Channel 4
- Release: May 5 – May 19, 2016

Grayson Perry: All Man is a 2016 British television miniseries about masculinity presented by Grayson Perry.

== Episode 1: "Hard Man" ==
- Air date 5 May 2016

Perry meets cage fighters.

== Episode 2: "Top Man" ==
- Air date 12 May 2016

Perry meets the police and underclass people in Skelmersdale, Lancashire.

== Episode 3: "Rational Man" ==
- Air date 19 May 2016

Perry meets men who work in finance in the City of London.
