= Ravenswood, Ipswich =

District of Ipswich, Suffolk, England

Coordinates: 52.02943°N 1.19543°E

Ravenswood
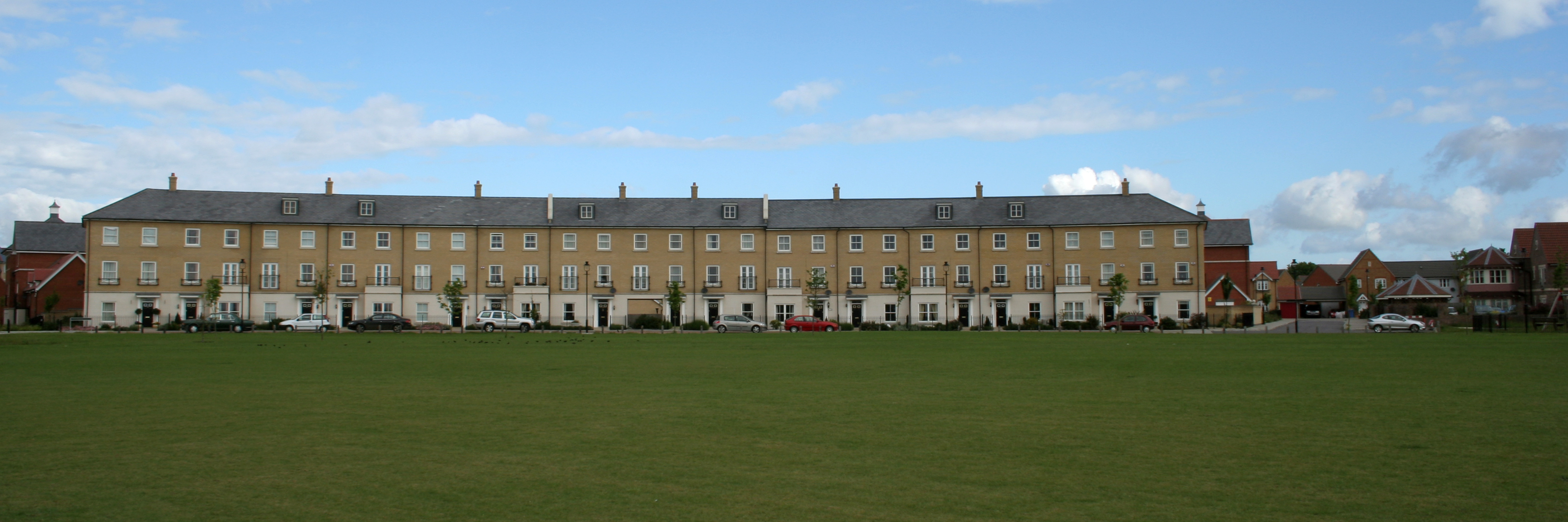
- Part of Bonny Crescent, overlooking the Cricket pitch in Ravenswood

- Location within Suffolk
- District: Ipswich
- Shire county: Suffolk
- Region: East
- Country: England
- Sovereign state: United Kingdom
- Police: Suffolk
- Fire: Suffolk
- Ambulance: East of England

Ravenswood is a district within Ipswich, in the Ipswich district, in the county of Suffolk, England. It is sited on the old Ipswich Airport to the south-east of the town. The area has grown rapidly due to private housing development. The old airport building has been transformed into small flats, and part of the terminal has been redeveloped for commercial purposes.

1172 homes have been built on the site so far, with a few hundred more to be built in the coming years, along with a planned sports park. The estate is bound to the north by Nacton Road, bound to the west and south west by Gainsborough Sports Centre and the Orwell County Park. It is also bound to the south by the A14 and a disused airport access road.

== Construction ==
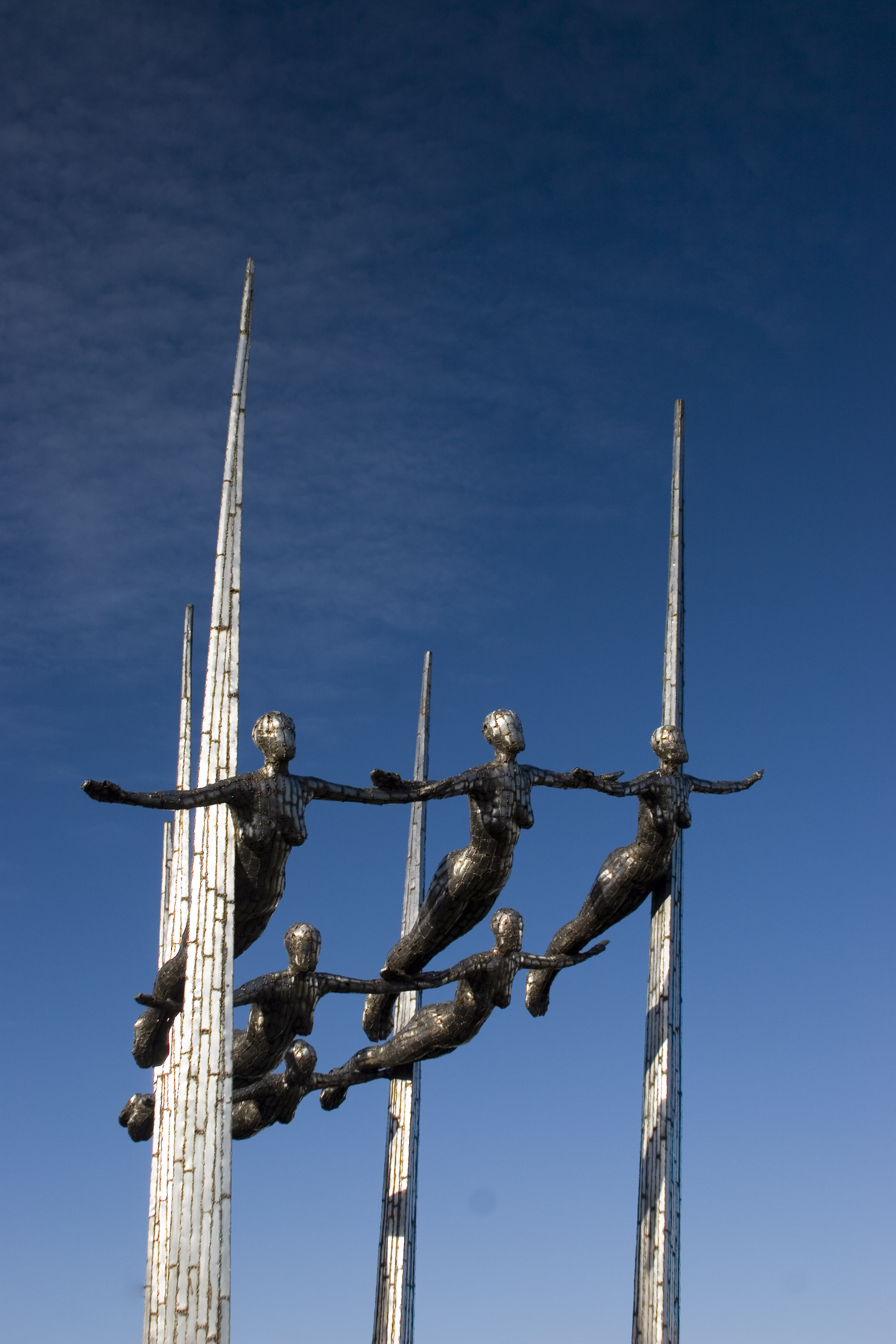
Formation sculpture by Rick Kirby at entrance to Ravenswood.

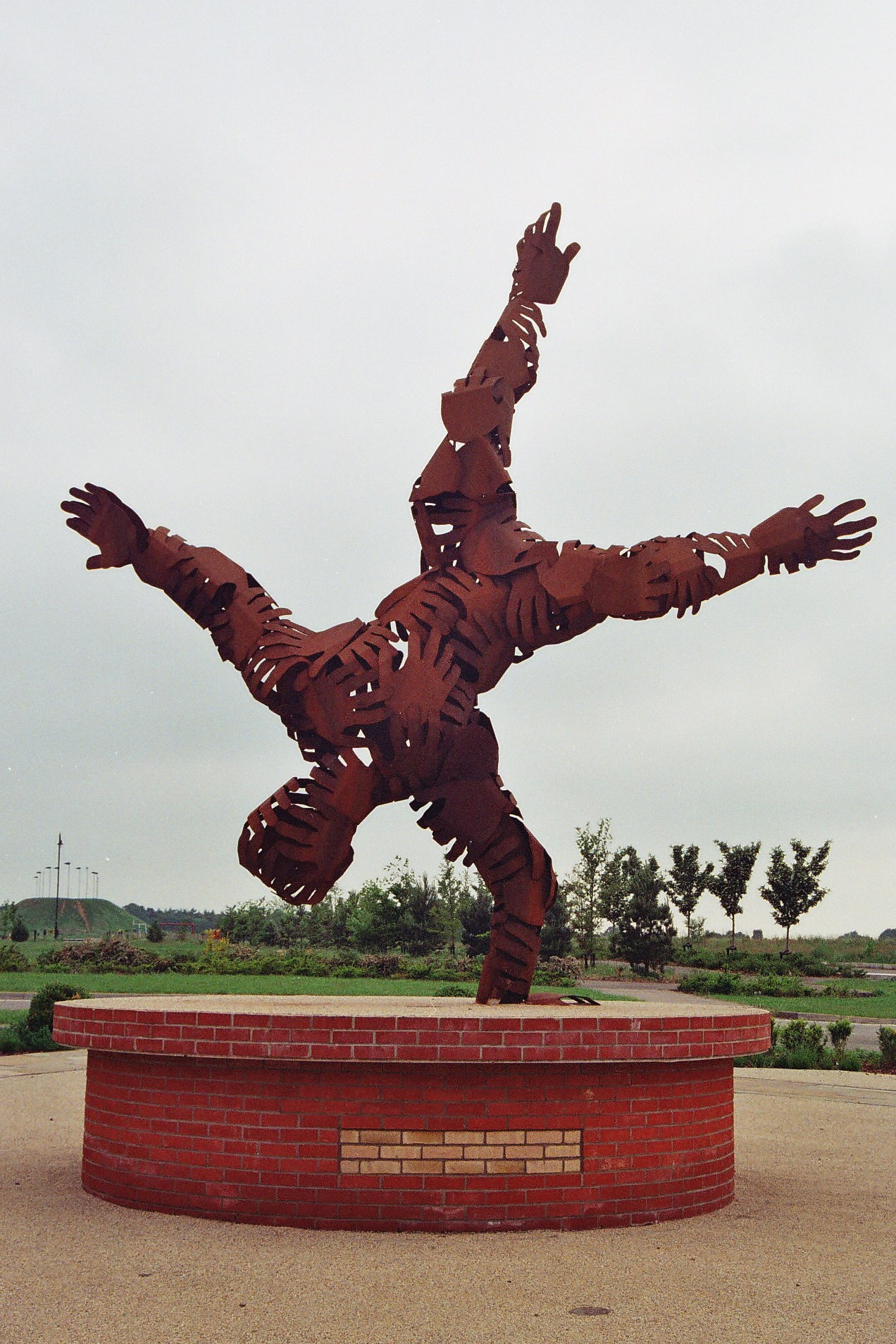
Handstanding sculpture by Martin Heron near Ravenswood Primary School

The development was planned to be environmentally sensitive. Space for cars is limited, with traffic calming measures and frequent bus service links to the town centre. Mixed cycle paths and walkways are also a feature. Incorporated into the design of the buildings and sewers is a sustainable urban drainage system which allows rainfall to be returned to the environment without going through the sewerage system.

A number of pieces of public art have been installed: "Formation" by Rick Kirby at the entrance, designed to commemorate the areas links with aviation; "Handstanding" by Martin Heron near the school; "Green Wind 2" by Diane Maclean as a focal point beyond the end of Downham Boulevard on the Tump; and "Propeller" by Harry Gray has been placed adjacent to the green.

The estate was fully built by Persimmon plc and Bellway, as well as Charles Church to the South of the estate. 4 restaurants have also been constructed at the entrance of the estate.

In Autumn 2019, a resident discovered an untapped fund for community projects from Bellway, who built much of the housing on the estate, which totalled about £60000. Soon after Some of the fund was used to pave a dirt track from the edge of the estate to the country park near The Tump on the nearby Brazier's Wood . More recently, a new fencing project by Ipswich Borough Council has closed off some of the nearby meadows to help safeguard rare Skylarks from human activity and disturbance. The area is also a habitat for Muntjac deer, ladybirds and lizards due to the grassland and heathland habitats being suitable for wildlife.

At the end of 2019, plans for The Stephen Hawking Neurological Centre next to Bluebird lodge along the South of the estate. It has a planned capacity of 24 residents and will be a local centre for the charity running the site. As of December 2021, no construction has occurred yet, but it may begin in 2022.

In March 2021, Ipswich Borough Council approved plans from Handford Homes, a housing company owned by Ipswich Borough Council, for 96 new homes on areas U, V, and W. There is a lot of criticism about the plans, due to the high number of social homes in the same place, potentially breaking the 35:65 social to private home plan that made the estate successful and attractive for residents. Despite these criticisms, construction will begin in early 2022, and it will go ahead as planned.

== Amenities ==
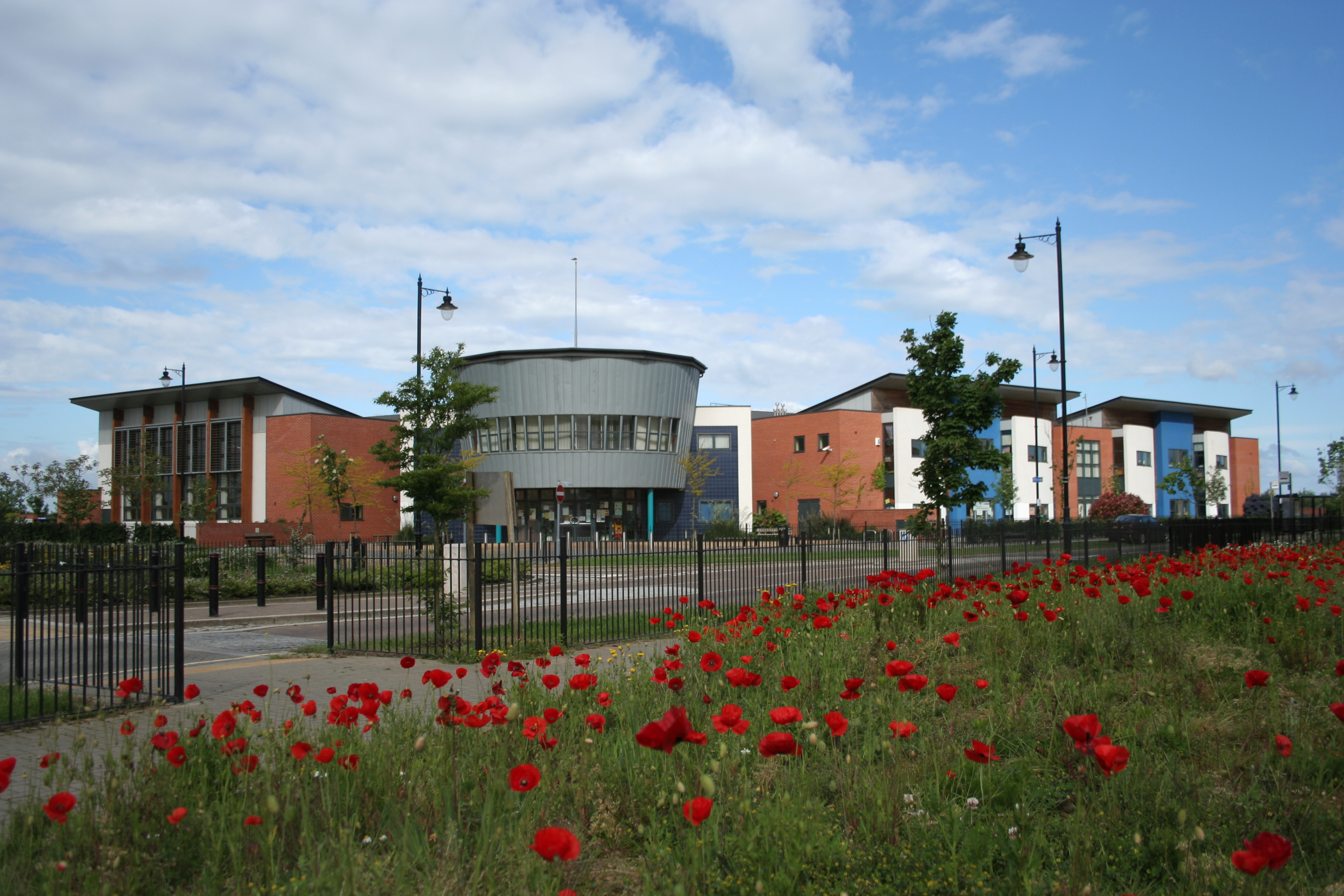
Ravenswood Community Primary School.

Ravenswood has a primary school with a good Ofsted rating, sports centre and an NHS independent care centre. A retirement home named after Jamie Cann the MP for Ipswich who died in 2001 is also in the area. Behind the former airport terminal building, which has been converted into apartments, a small shopping centre has been built with one public house. Orwell Country Park is near to the area. The estate also features more care homes, known as Bluebird Lodge and Prince George care home.

Patches of gym equipment have also been installed due to money received from a community fund in 2019.

== See also ==
- The Perfect Home
