= The Perfect Home =

- Starring: Alain de Botton
- Original language: English
- No. of episodes: 3

Production
- Running time: 42 min.

Original release
- Network: Channel 4
- Release: 1 May – 3 May 2006

The Perfect Home is a television series of three 42 minute episodes commissioned for Channel 4 based on the book The Architecture of Happiness by Alain de Botton which first aired in 2006.

In the programmes, Alain de Botton explored the importance of innovative architecture for homes. He offered criticism of modern developments that build in an idealized fake heritage style, which he referred to as pastiche, often referring back to the example of Great Notley Garden Village near Braintree, Essex.

The first programme looks at how the current status quo came about where volume builders are typically building houses with architectural styles harking back to pre-industrial eras such as mock Tudor, neo-Georgian and mock country cottage façades.

The second looks at what defines a building's beauty, drawing parallels with the differences between the Catholic and Protestant ideals in their respective places of worship, suggesting the comparison was a trade off between decoration versus a more utilitarian approach.

The third programme looks at how the current situation could be improved, with de Botton's preferred option being that buildings' architecture should reflect the era in which they are built. To this end, he approached Bellway Homes with examples of more contemporary designs being used on in the Netherlands as a suggested alternative. Bellway's reaction was quite positive, and they have incorporated more contemporary designs into their Ravenswood development on the former Ipswich Airport site in Suffolk.

Some found the series abstruse and the issue too complex to fit into a television format.
