= Status Anxiety =

2004 book by Alain de Botton

- Author: Alain de Botton
- Subject: Philosophy, psychology, sociology
- Publisher: Hamish Hamilton, Penguin Books
- Publication date: 2004
- ISBN: 0-375-42083-5

Status Anxiety is a nonfiction book by Alain de Botton. It was first published in 2004 by Hamish Hamilton; subsequent publications have been by Penguin Books.

== Central thesis ==
According to De Botton, "status anxiety" is a 21st-century phenomenon which is a result of capitalism, democracy, and an ostensibly egalitarian society, and is prevalent in countries where an inequality in income is evident. Status anxiety can be defined as the constant tension or fear of being perceived as "unsuccessful" by the society in materialistic terms. Today, every individual constantly tries to outsmart the others to climb up the social ladder. The effects of status anxiety can include impulse buying and conspicuous consumption. Meritocracy is a primary cause of status anxiety. A meritocracy is a society in which only those deemed talented and meritorious will end up at the top of the social ladder. Snobbery, envy, and lovelessness are some other causes of status anxiety.

De Botton first noticed this phenomenon among the wealthy families of America. These Americans had a lavish lifestyle and most of it was just to make those around them feel envious. America had also witnessed the trend of figures who are "famous for being famous". Botton met the American motivational speaker Les Brown to understand how motivational speaking works. He concluded that motivational speakers conducted their speeches to induce status anxiety among individuals. Motivational speaking is based on the idea that "no one is living up to their true potential and everyone has scope for improvement". De Botton challenged this by asking, "What about those who want to achieve but lack the opportunities to do so?"

De Botton lays out the causes of and solutions to status anxiety as follows:

Causes:

- Lovelessness
- Expectation
- Meritocracy
- Snobbery
- Dependence

Solutions:

- Philosophy
- Art
- Politics
- Religion
- Bohemianism

== Film ==
A two-hour documentary film about this thesis, also called Status Anxiety and written by Alain de Botton, was released in 2004. A version of it was shown in 2008 on Public Broadcasting Service channels like Boston WGBH-TV's digital channel WGBX-TV in the United States.

== Earlier uses of the term ==
In his 1965 book The Paranoid Style in American Politics, historian Richard Hofstadter used the term "status anxiety" to help explain the origins of the progressive movement, following earlier usage by others. Alain de Botton's use of the term is different.

== See also ==
- Social status
- Affluenza
- Feelings of insignificance
