= All in the Best Possible Taste with Grayson Perry =

- Genre: Documentary television
- Directed by: Neil Crombie
- Starring: Grayson Perry
- Country of origin: United Kingdom
- Original language: English
- No. of series: 1
- No. of episodes: 3

Production
- Executive producer: Dinah Lord
- Producers: Joe Evans; Emily Jeal; Juliet Riddell
- Running time: 46 minutes

Original release
- Network: Channel 4
- Release: 5 June – 19 June 2012

All in the Best Possible Taste with Grayson Perry is a 2012 documentary television series on United Kingdom station Channel 4, starring the artist Grayson Perry. The series analysed the ideas of taste held by the different social classes in the United Kingdom. In it, Perry produced a series of six tapestries depicting the taste ideas of Britons, entitled "The Vanity of Small Differences".

== Episodes ==
No.	Title	Directed by	Original release date
1	"Working Class Taste"	Neil Crombie	5 June 2012
Perry studies working class taste, visiting Sunderland and looking at tattoos, modified cars, cosmetics and football.
2	"Middle Class Taste"	Neil Crombie	12 June 2012
Perry studies middle class taste, visiting Royal Tunbridge Wells and Kings Hill.
3	"Upper Class Taste"	Neil Crombie	19 June 2012
Perry studies upper class taste, visiting the Cotswolds.

== Reception ==
All In The Best Possible Taste with Grayson Perry received very positive reviews from the British press. The Daily Telegraph called it "one of the TV highlights of the year so far". The Independent described it as "lovely". The Guardian described it as a "glorious, inspired and incisive investigation into modern British taste". On 12 May 2013, All in the Best Possible Taste with Grayson Perry won a Bafta Specialist Factual award.
