= Sandra Martin (TV personality) =

English television personality (born 1962)

- Occupation: Television personality
- Years active: 2013–present
- Television: Gogglebox; 100 Years Younger in 21 Days

Sandra Martin is an English television personality, known for appearing on Channel 4 programme Gogglebox between 2013 and 2017.

== Life and career ==
Martin is from Brixton, London. In 1984, she served six months in prison after being convicted of fraud. In 2013, Martin was living off benefits when she was approached in a pub by a Channel 4 production member to become a cast member on the reality programme Gogglebox, and when asked if there was anyone who could appear alongside her, she suggested her friend Sandi Bogle. After Bogle left the show after eight series in 2016, Martin was joined alongside her daughter Chanchez for the ninth series. Martin announced her departure from the show in July 2017.

In March 2018, Martin appeared on the ITV series 100 Years Younger in 21 Days. The programme followed celebrities as they underwent various procedures and activities over the course of a week in an attempt to reverse ageing. In October 2018, she appeared on a celebrity edition of First Dates. Since appearing on television, Martin has continued to rely on benefits, and has had spates of homelessness in recent years.

== Filmography ==
As herself
Year	Title	Role	Ref.
2013–2017	Gogglebox	Cast member	
2016	Up Late with Rylan	Audience member	
2016	First Dates	Participant	
2017	This Morning	Guest; 1 episode	
2018	Loose Women	Guest; 1 episode	
2018	100 Years Younger in 21 Days	Participant	
2019	Judge Rinder	Guest; 1 episode	
2019	Judge Romesh	Guest; 1 episode	
2020	Dragony Aunts	Guest; 1 episode	
