= Raqib Shaw =

Indian artist

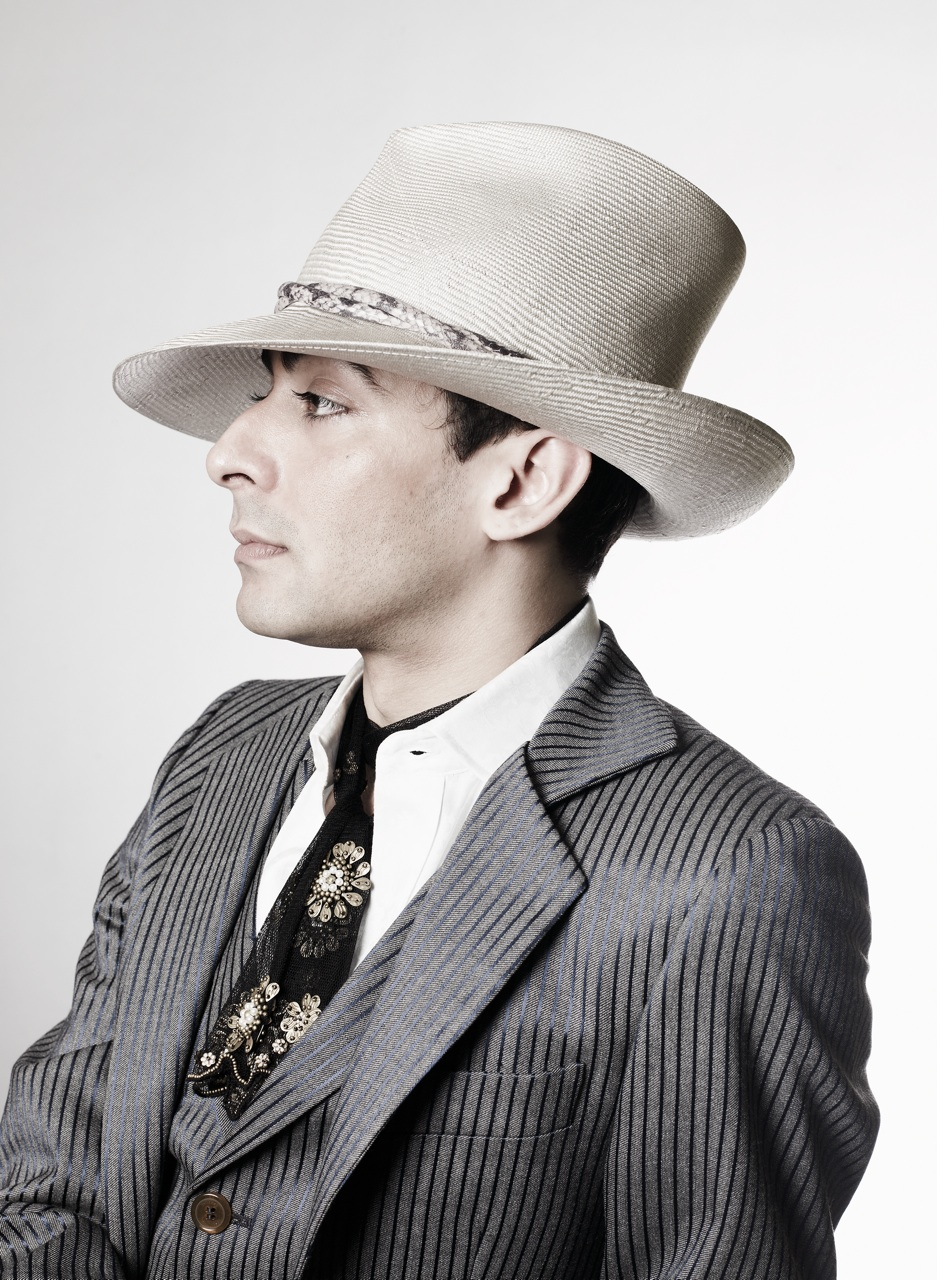
Raqib Shaw, 2010

Raqib Shaw (born 1974) is an Indian artist based in London. He is known for his opulent and intricate paintings of imagined paradises, inlaid with vibrantly coloured jewels and enamel. His paintings and sculptures evoke the work of Old Masters such as Holbein and Bosch, whilst drawing on multifarious sources, from mythology and religion to poetry, literature, art history, textiles and decorative arts from both eastern (including Indian) and western traditions, all infused with the artist's imagination.

== Early life ==
Raqib Shaw was born in Calcutta in 1974, but spent his formative years in Jammu and Kashmir where his family worked as merchants.

In 1989 political unrest began to grow in Kashmir, eventually driving the Shaw family to relocate to New Delhi in 1992. From 1992–1998 Shaw worked for his maternal uncle in the family business, an activity that ranged from interior design, architecture, to selling jewellery, antiques, carpets and fabrics. This opportunity brought him into contact with the many beautiful things that were being made in India.

Family business brought Shaw to London in 1993, where he was able to see the paintings at the National Gallery for the first time. This encounter convinced him to spend the rest of his life in England as a practising artist.

In 1998, Shaw moved to London where he studied for both his BA and MA at Central Saint Martins School of Art.

Though Shaw initially struggled with painting, his early experiments with a number of materials, namely enamel, household and car paint, bought from a local branch of Leyland, were to set the foundation for his technique of manipulating pools of industrial paint with a porcupine quill.

== Artistic practice ==
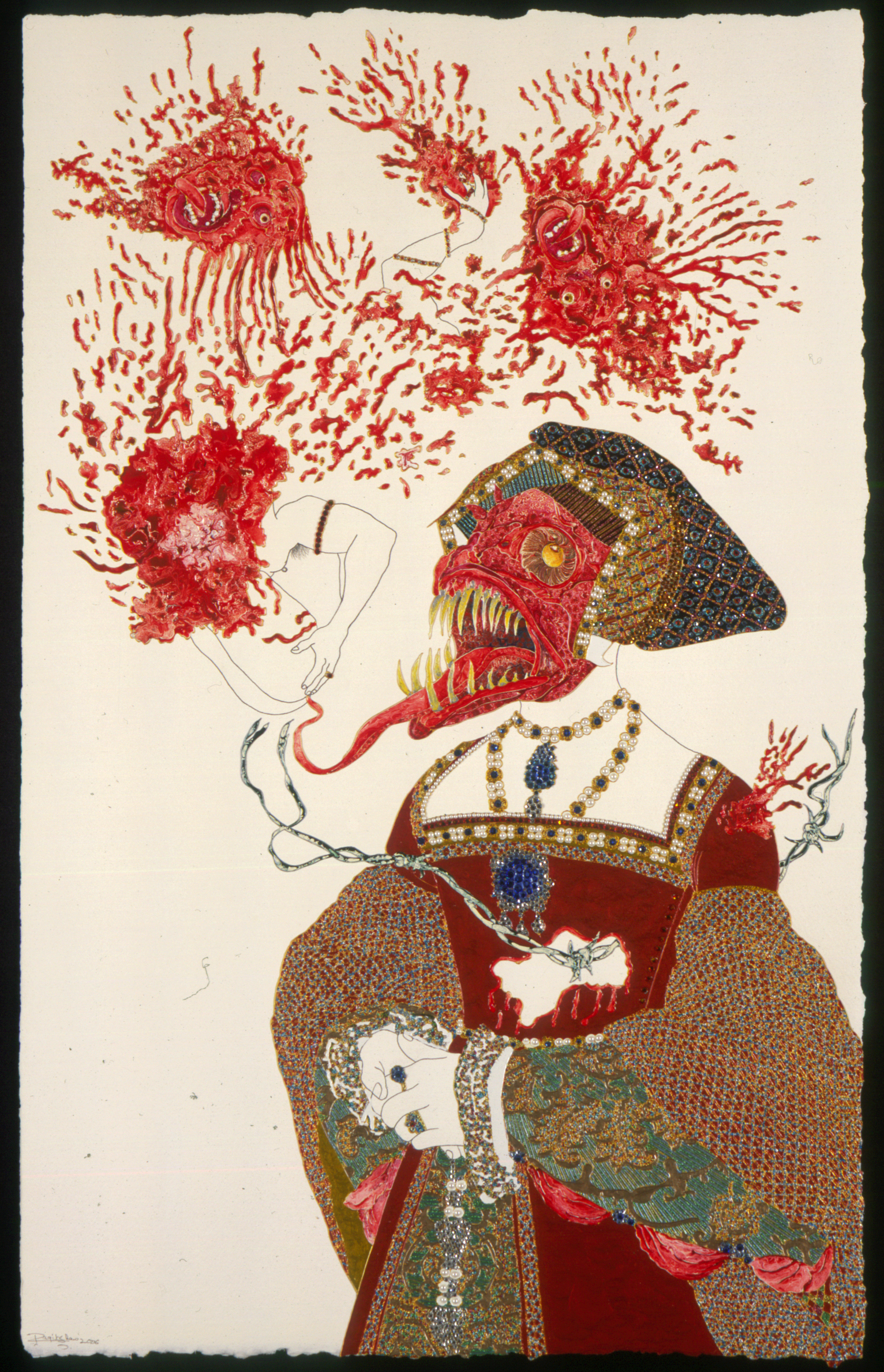
Jane, 2006

Paradise Lost, 2001–2011

Shaw's paintings suggest a fantastical world full of intricate detail, rich colour and jewel-like surfaces, all masking a collection of intensely violent and sexual images. Fused with an eco-system of vibrantly painted flora and fauna, half human/half animal creatures, with screaming mouths and engorged or bleeding eyes are characters in a dizzying scene of erotic hedonism, both explosive and gruesome in its debauchery.

Shaw says these fantastical worlds are laden with satire and irony, and can be read 'as a commentary on my own experience of living in this society, and of being alive'.

A typical painting consists of many stages. Shaw starts with small drawings on paper, featuring characters, flora and fauna. These are then transferred to acetate as individual elements. Shaw begins the composition of the painting by projecting these drawings onto the panel, starting from the centre and working outwards. Once the composition has been drawn out in pen, the panel is taken down from the wall and laid flat. Stained-glass liner is then applied, following the contours of the pen, to create tiny cofferdams. Using small plastic tubes with fine nozzles, paint is then poured into these dams and manipulated by a porcupine quill to suggest form. Glitter is added to specific parts providing extra ornamentation. Lastly, crystals are glued to highlight other areas.

== Solo exhibitions ==
- Raqib Shaw: Paradise Lost, Art Institute of Chicago (2025-2026)
- Raqib Shaw: Ballads of East and West, Frist Art Museum, Nashville (2023), Isabella Stewart Gardner Museum (2024), Museum of Fine Arts in Houston (2024), Huntington Library (2024-2025)
- Raqib Shaw: Reinventing the Old Masters, Scottish National Gallery of Modern Art (2018)
- Raqib Shaw: Whitworth Art Gallery, Manchester (2017)
- New Sculptures, Galerie Thaddaeus Ropac, Salzburg (2015)
- New Sculptures and Paintings, Galerie Thaddaeus Ropac, Paris (2015)
- Raqib Shaw: Paradise Lost, Pace Gallery (2013)
- Raqib Shaw: Galerie Rudolfinium, Prague (2013)
- Raqib Shaw: Manchester Art Gallery, Manchester (2013)
- Of Beasts and Super-Beasts, Galerie Thaddaeus Ropac, Paris (2012)
- Paradise Lost, White Cube, London Masons Yard (2011)
- Absence Of God, White Cube, London Hoxton Square (2009)
- Absence Of God, Karlsplatz Project Space, Kunsthalle Wien, Wien (2009)
- Raqib Shaw at the Met, Metropolitan Museum of Art, New York, (2008-2009)
- Art Now: Raqib Shaw, Tate Britain, London (2006)
- Garden of Earthly Delights, Museum of Contemporary Art, North Miami (2006)
- Garden of Earthly Delights, Deitch Projects, New York (2005)
- Garden of Earthly Delights, Victoria Miro Gallery, London (2004)

== Collections ==
- Amore Pacific Museum of Art, Korea
- Metropolitan Museum of Art, New York
- Museum of Modern Art, New York
- Queensland Art Gallery, Australia
- Tate Britain, London

== On television ==
In May 2020, Shaw was featured in the third episode of the first series of Grayson's Art Club, talking in his studio about his art.
