= Alain de Botton =

British author

Alain de Botton FRSL HonRIBA
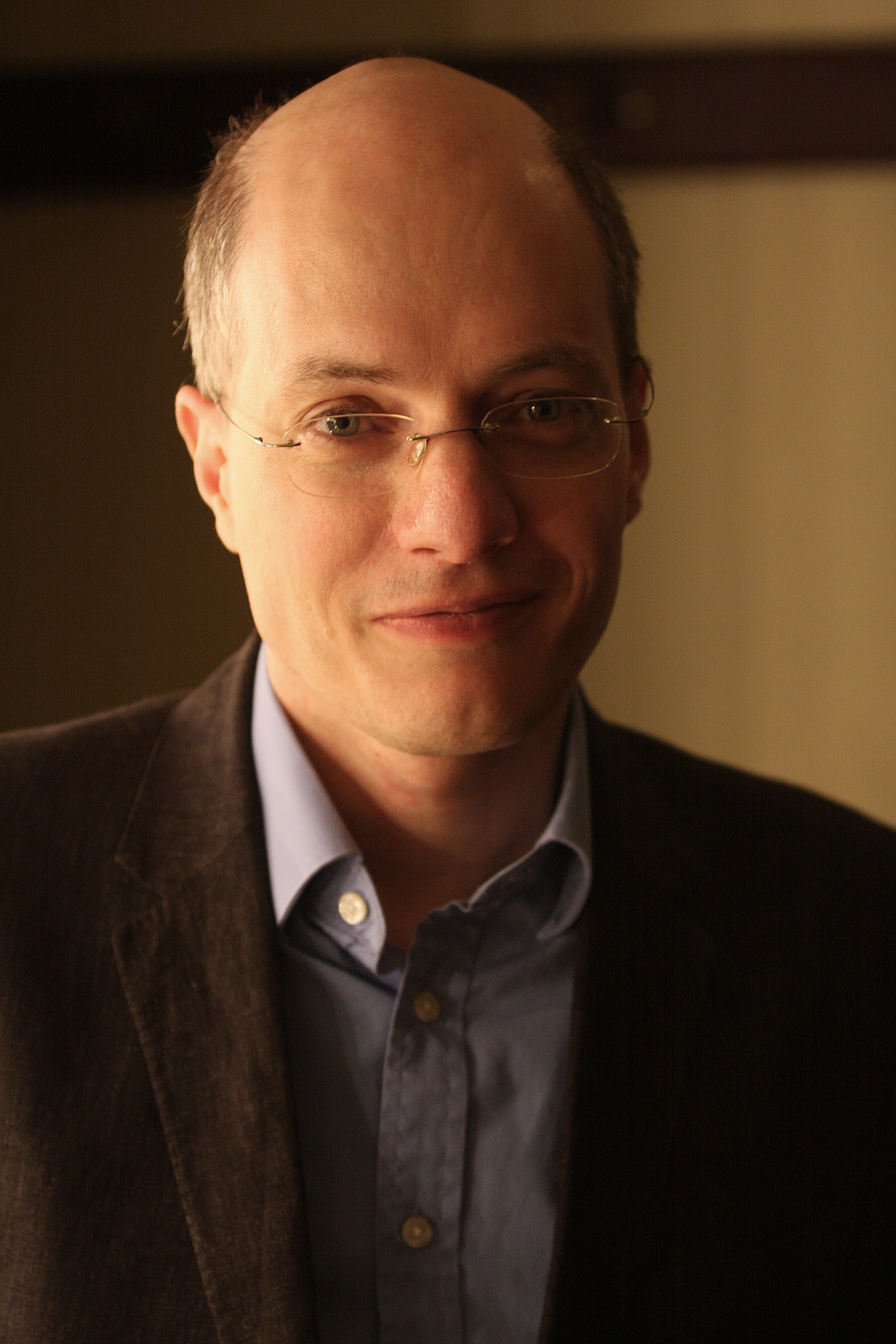
- De Botton in 2011
- Born: Zürich, Switzerland
- Education: Gonville and Caius College, Cambridge (BA); King's College London (MPhil); Harvard University
- Occupations: Writer, speaker
- Writing career
- Period: 1993–present
- De Botton's voice De Botton speaking at Cannes Lions 2012 on the fear of failure
- Website: alaindebotton.com

Alain de Botton FRSL HonRIBA (/də ˈbɒtən/) is a British author and public speaker. His books discuss various contemporary subjects and themes, emphasising the relevance of philosophy to everyday life. In 1993, he published Essays in Love, which went on to sell two million copies. Other bestsellers include How Proust Can Change Your Life (1997), Status Anxiety (2004), and The Architecture of Happiness (2006).

He co-founded The School of Life in 2008 and Living Architecture in 2009. He was elected a Fellow of the Royal Society of Literature in 2011.

== Early life and education ==
Alain de Botton was born in Zürich, Switzerland, the son of Jacqueline (née Burgauer) and Gilbert de Botton. Gilbert was born in Alexandria, Egypt, but went to live and work in Switzerland, where he co-founded an investment firm, Global Asset Management, bringing great wealth to the family.

His Swiss-born mother was Ashkenazi, and his father was from a Sephardic Jewish family from the town of Boton in Castile and León. De Botton's ancestors include Abraham de Boton. De Botton's paternal grandmother was Yolande Harmer, a Jewish-Egyptian journalist who spied for Israel and died in Jerusalem. Alain and his sister, Miel de Botton, received a secular upbringing.

De Botton spent the first 12 years of his life in Switzerland where he was brought up speaking French and German. He then attended the Dragon School, a private prep school in Oxford, England, where English became his primary language. He was later sent to board and study at Harrow School, a public school in England.

De Botton studied history at University of Cambridge, where he was a member of Gonville and Caius College, graduating with a double starred first. He then completed an MPhil in Philosophy at King’s College London (1991-92), before studying for a PhD in French philosophy at Harvard University in the US. However, he gave up his research to write books for the general public.

== Writing ==
=== Fiction ===
In his first novel, Essays in Love (titled On Love in the U.S.), published in 1993, de Botton deals with the process of falling in and out of love. In 2010, Essays in Love was adapted to film by director Julian Kemp for the romantic comedy My Last Five Girlfriends. De Botton wrote a sequel to Essays in Love, published in 2016, titled The Course of Love.

=== Non-fiction ===
In 1997 he published his first non-fiction book, How Proust Can Change Your Life, based on the life and works of Marcel Proust. It was a bestseller in both the UK and US.

This was followed by The Consolations of Philosophy in 2000. The title of the book is a reference to Boethius's Consolation of Philosophy, in which philosophy appears as an allegorical figure to Boethius to console him in the period leading up to his impending execution. In The Consolations of Philosophy, de Botton attempts to demonstrate how the teachings of philosophers such as Epicurus, Montaigne, Nietzsche, Schopenhauer, Seneca and Socrates can be applied to modern everyday woes. The book has been both praised and criticised for its therapeutic approach to philosophy.

In 2004, he published Status Anxiety.

In The Architecture of Happiness (2006), he discusses the nature of beauty in architecture and how it is related to the well-being and general contentment of the individual and society. He describes how architecture affects people every day, though people rarely pay particular attention to it. A good portion of the book discusses how human personality traits are reflected in architecture. He defends Modernist architecture, and chastises the pseudo-vernacular architecture of housing, especially in the UK. "The best modern architecture," he argues, "doesn't hold a mirror up to nature, though it may borrow a pleasing shape or expressive line from nature's copybook. It gives voice to aspirations and suggests possibilities. The question isn't whether you'd actually like to live in a Le Corbusier home, but whether you'd like to be the kind of person who'd like to live in one."

In The Pleasures and Sorrows of Work (2009), de Botton produced a survey of ten different jobs, including accountancy, rocket science and biscuit manufacture. The book, a piece of narrative non-fiction, includes two hundred original images and aims to unlock the beauty, interest and occasional horror of the modern world of work. After a negative review of the book by New York Times critic Caleb Crain, de Botton posted a scathing ad hominem attack against Crain. He later apologized for his remarks.

In August 2009, de Botton applied to a competition advertised among British literary agents by the airport management company BAA for the post of "writer-in-residence" at Heathrow Airport. The post involved being seated at a desk in Terminal 5, and writing about the comings and goings of passengers over a week. De Botton was appointed to the position. The result was the book, A Week at the Airport, published by Profile Books in September 2009. The book features photographs by the documentary photographer Richard Baker, with whom de Botton also worked on The Pleasures and Sorrows of Work.

In January 2012, de Botton published Religion for Atheists, about the benefits of religions for those who do not believe in them. De Botton put it: "It's clear to me that religions are in the end too complex, interesting and on occasion wise to be abandoned simply to those who believe in them". In April 2012, he published How to Think More about Sex, one in a series of six books on topics of emotional life published by his enterprise, The School of Life.

In October 2013, he published Art as Therapy, co-written with the Australian-Scottish art historian, John Armstrong. Art as Therapy argues that certain great works of art "offer clues on managing the tensions and confusions of everyday life".

In February 2014, de Botton published his fourteenth book, a title called The News: A User's Manual, a study of the effects of the news on modern mentality, viewed through the prism of 25 news stories, culled from a variety of sources, which de Botton analyses in detail. The book delved with more rigour into de Botton's analyses of the modern media that appeared in Status Anxiety.

=== Newspapers ===
De Botton used to write articles for several English newspapers and from 1998 to 2000 wrote a regular column for The Independent on Sunday.

== Lecturing, television, and radio ==
De Botton travels extensively to lecture, including at TED conferences. In July 2009, he spoke at Oxford University about the philosophy of failure and success, and questions the assumptions underlying these two judgments. In July 2011, he spoke in Edinburgh about "Atheism 2.0", an idea of atheism that also incorporates our human need for connection, ritual and transcendence.

In 2011 he presented a series of talks for the BBC Radio 4 series A Point of View.

He has his own production company, Seneca Productions, which makes television documentaries based upon his works.

== Reception of his writing ==
De Botton has written in a variety of formats to mixed response. Positive reviews of his books attest that he has made literature, philosophy, and art more accessible to a wider audience.

Negative reviews suggest that De Botton tends to state the obvious and have characterised some of his books as reducing complex philosophy to agreeable, digestible self-help guides.

He was elected a Fellow of the Royal Society of Literature in 2011.

In 2015, he was awarded "The Fellowship of Schopenhauer", an annual writers' award from the Melbourne Writers Festival.

== Other projects ==
=== The School of Life ===
De Botton co-founded The School of Life in 2008, as part of a team of writers and educators. Based in London, Paris, Amsterdam, Antwerp, Seoul, Istanbul, Tel Aviv, São Paulo, Berlin, and Melbourne, The School of Life offers an emotional education focusing in particular on the issues of work and relationships. In an interview with Metkere.com, De Botton said:

The idea is to challenge traditional universities and reorganise knowledge, directing it towards life, and away from knowledge for its own sake. In a modest way, it’s an institution that is trying to give people what universities should I think always give them: a sense of direction and wisdom for their lives with the help of culture.

=== Living Architecture ===
In May 2009, de Botton launched a project called "Living Architecture," which builds holiday rental houses in the UK using leading contemporary architects. These include Peter Zumthor, MVRDV, JVA, NORD, and Michael and Patti Hopkins. One was built in collaboration between artist Grayson Perry and the architecture firm FAT. De Botton, the creative director and chairman of Living Architecture, aims to improve the appreciation of good contemporary architecture—a task that serves as a practical continuation of his theoretical work on architecture in his book The Architecture of Happiness. In October 2009, he was appointed an honorary fellow of the Royal Institute of British Architects (RIBA), in recognition of his services to architecture.

=== Museum displays ===
In 2014, de Botton was invited by three museums—the Rijksmuseum in Amsterdam, the National Gallery of Victoria in Melbourne and the Art Gallery of Ontario in Toronto—to contribute content to special exhibitions based on his work, Art as Therapy. De Botton and his colleague John Armstrong inserted captions, arranged on large Post-it-style labels designed by the Dutch graphic artist, Irma Boom, bearing slogans and commentary on exhibits throughout the Rijksmuseum.

== Personal life ==
De Botton has described his relationship with his father as difficult, stating: "When I sold my first bestseller (and a million dollars was peanuts for my father) he was not impressed and wondered what I was going to do with myself." When his father died, his family was left a large trust fund, although de Botton says his income is derived solely from his own activities (book sales, speaking engagements, business consulting, The School of Life). Alain's stepmother, Janet Wolfson de Botton, is a prominent patron of the arts and competition bridge player.

In August 2014, de Botton was one of 200 public figures who were signatories to a letter to The Guardian opposing Scottish independence in the run-up to September's referendum on that issue.

== Bibliography ==
=== Books ===
- De Botton, Alain (1993). Essays in love. London: Macmillan.
  - — (1993). On love. New York: Grove Press. Variant title in USA.
  - — (1994) [1993]. Essays in love. Paperback reprint. London: Picador.
  - — (2006). Essays in love. Revised ed. London: Picador.
  - — (2015) [2006]. Essays in love. Reprint of 2006 revised ed. London: Picador.
- The Romantic Movement (1994)
- Kiss and Tell (1995)
- How Proust Can Change Your Life (1997)
- The Consolations of Philosophy (2000)
- The Art of Travel (2002)
- Status Anxiety (2004)
- The Architecture of Happiness (2006)
- The Pleasures and Sorrows of Work (2009)
- A Week at the Airport (2009)
- Religion for Atheists: A Non-Believer's Guide to the Uses of Religion (2012)
- How to Think More About Sex (2012)
- De Botton, Alain; Armstrong, John (2013). Art as therapy. London: Phaidon Press.
- The News: A User's Manual (2014)
- The Course of Love (2016)
- The School of Life: An Emotional Education (2020)
- A Therapeutic Journey - Lessons from the School of Life (2023)

=== Critical studies, reviews and biography ===
- Hamilton, Ben (4 January 2014). "The healing art". Books. The Spectator. 324 (9671): 23–24. Review of Art as therapy.

== Filmography ==
- My Last Five Girlfriends (based on Essays in Love)

=== TV series ===
- Philosophy: A Guide To Happiness (2000, from The Consolations of Philosophy)
1. Socrates on Self-Confidence
2. Epicurus on Happiness
3. Seneca on Anger
4. Montaigne on Self-Esteem
5. Schopenhauer on Love
6. Nietzsche on Hardship (featuring Cathal Grealish)
- Status Anxiety
- The Art of Travel
- The Perfect Home (from The Architecture of Happiness)
