= The Architecture of Happiness =

2006 book by Alain de Botton

- Author: Alain De Botton
- Language: English
- Subject: Architecture, philosophy, Architectural Psychology, Aesthetics
- Publisher: Vintage Books
- Publication date: 2006
- Publication place: United States of America
- Media type: Print (Hardcover & paperback)
- Pages: 280 pp.
- ISBN: 978-0241142486

The Architecture of Happiness is a book by Alain de Botton which discusses the importance of beauty, published by Pantheon Books in 2006. De Botton, inspired by Stendhal's motto "beauty is the promise of happiness," analyzes human surroundings and how human needs and desires manifest their ideals in architecture.

== Reception ==
The Architecture of Happiness attracted favourable attention from architects and architectural critics. In the Boston Globe, the architectural critic Robert Campbell declared it the "best introduction to architecture" that he had ever read. There was favorable comment from UK, US and Australian critics. In recognition of his services to architecture with the book, the RIBA made Alain de Botton an honorary fellow of the Institute in February 2010.

Not all reviews have been positive. Reviewing the book, New York Times reviewer Jim Holt, wrote "like de Botton's previous books, ... contains its quota of piffle dressed up in pompous language," saying that de Botton's over-sensitivity to his surroundings even becomes humorous "in a Woody Allen-ish sort of way." Another reviewer, Mark Lamster in I.D. Magazine wrote, "[De Botton] has produced a meandering, pompous disquisition that betrays an autodidact's haphazard sense of the field, but with little of the original thinking that might be expected from an outsider. ... The Architecture of Happiness would be an innocuous castoff if not for its proselytizing ambitions (it has so far spawned a PBS miniseries) and a set of rather insidious ideas camouflaged in its twee prose."

The book featured prominently in the 2009 film 500 Days of Summer, where it was the reading matter of choice for the protagonist.

== Adaptation ==
A television series, The Perfect Home, commissioned for Channel 4 and which first aired in 2006, was based on the book.
