= The Consolations of Philosophy =

2000 book by Alain de Botton

- Author: Alain de Botton
- Language: English
- Publisher: Hamish Hamilton, Penguin Books
- Publication date: 2000
- Publication place: Britain
- ISBN: 0-140-27661-0

The Consolations of Philosophy (ISBN 0-140-27661-0) is a non-fiction book by Alain de Botton. First published by Hamish Hamilton in 2000, subsequent publications (2001 onwards) have been by Penguin Books.

== Description ==
The title of the book is a reference to Boethius's magnum opus Consolation of Philosophy, in which philosophy appears as an allegorical figure to Boethius to console him in the year he was imprisoned, leading up to his impending execution.

In Consolations, de Botton attempts to console the reader through everyday problems (or at least help them to understand them) by extensively quoting and interpreting a number of philosophers. These are categorised in a number of chapters with one philosopher used in each.

- Consolation for a Broken Heart (Schopenhauer)
- Consolation for Difficulties (Nietzsche)
- Consolation for Frustration (Seneca)
- Consolation for Inadequacy (Montaigne)
- Consolation for Not Having Enough Money (Epicurus)
- Consolation for Unpopularity (Socrates)

== Critical response ==
The critical reception for Consolations has been primarily positive. It received glowing praise in, among other publications, The New York Review of Books, The Times, The Spectator, The Sunday Telegraph, The Sunday Times, The Irish Times and The Literary Review.

Humphrey Carpenter in The Sunday Times (2 April 2000) said, "The Consolations of Philosophy is certainly a commentary rather than a work of original thought; but few discussions on the great philosophers can have been so entertaining. De Botton takes us on a brisk, playful tour of the lives and ideas of half-a-dozen of the big names in the history of philosophy."

According to Ben Rogers in the Sunday Telegraph, "singling these thinkers out and grouping them together is only the smaller part of de Botton’s achievement. He has also succeeded in bringing each one to life. The lessons that he draws from his sages might, in other hands, have appeared trite. But he writes with such charm and freshness that he somehow avoids the pitfall."

Kirkus Reviews writes "Congenial, refreshing, original—and mercifully succinct—de Botton may well achieve the impossible by making philosophy popular."

Alison Lurie in New York Review of Books said, "the simplicity of his writing is not the product of a simple mind."

A few critics have been negative. Edward Skidelsky of the New Statesman wrote: "Comforting, but meaningless. In seeking to popularise philosophy, Alain de Botton has merely trivialised it, smoothing the discipline into a series of silly sound bites. ... [De Botton's The Consolations of Philosophy] is bad because the conception of philosophy that it promotes is a decadent one, and can only mislead readers as to the true nature of the discipline."

Jonathan Lear, writing in the New York Times, said: "Academic philosophy in the United States has virtually abandoned the attempt to speak to the culture at large, but philosophy professors are doing something of incredible importance: they are trying to get things right. That is the thread that connects them back to Socrates -- even if they are not willing to follow him into the marketplace -- and that is the thread that The Consolations of Philosophy cuts. ...[L]et's face it, this isn't philosophy."

== Television adaptation ==
The book was the inspiration for the Channel 4 TV series Philosophy: A Guide To Happiness. The series was produced mirroring the book's layout with the following six episodes:

1. Socrates on Self-Confidence
2. Epicurus on Happiness
3. Seneca on Anger
4. Montaigne on Self-Esteem
5. Schopenhauer on Love
6. Nietzsche on Hardship

== See also ==
- Arthur Schopenhauer
- Boethius
- Epicurus
- Friedrich Nietzsche
- Michel de Montaigne
- Seneca the Younger
- Socrates

== Bibliography ==
- de Botton, Alain (2000-03-28). The Consolations of Philosophy. Hamish Hamilton; First Edition (28 Mar 2000); ISBN 0241140099; ISBN 978-0241140093; LC call # BJ1595.5 .D43 2000.
