= Flo Perry =

British illustrator and writer (1992)

- Born: Florence Perry; 1992 (age 33–34)
- Education: Durham University
- Occupations: Artist; writer
- Employer: BuzzFeed
- Notable work: How to Have Feminist Sex (2019)
- Parents: Grayson Perry (father); Philippa Perry (mother)

Florence Perry (born 1992) is an English artist and writer, based in East London. She is most known for her book How to Have Feminist Sex (2019).

== Biography ==
Perry was born in 1992. Her parents are Sir Grayson Perry and Philippa Perry. She grew up in North London. She now lives in East London.

Perry studied chemistry at Durham University and after graduating worked as an editor at BuzzFeed. After leaving BuzzFeed in 2017, she began producing pet portraits.

In 2019, Perry and her parents appeared on Channel 4's 2019 Celebrity Gogglebox Stand Up To Cancer special.

Perry came out as a lesbian at the age of 15, later saying she was bisexual. She wrote and illustrated the book How to Have Feminist Sex (2019). In 2024, Perry's book was translated into Slovenian. It has also been covered internationally by Vogue India.

In 2020, Perry illustrated Couch Fiction, a graphic novel on psychotherapy written by her mother, Philippa Perry.

In 2023, Perry exhibited a self portrait "Bathroom Debris" at the London Art Biennale. The painting has also been displayed at Warrington Museum and Art Gallery's 2025 exhibition "Any, Body, Home".

== Publications ==
=== Publications by Perry ===
- How to Have Feminist Sex: A Fairly Graphic Guide. Particular, 2019. ISBN 978-0241391563.

=== Publications illustrated by Perry ===
- The Girl's Guide To Growing Up Great. Green Tree, 2018. By Sophie Elkan. ISBN 978-1472943743.
- Remember This When You're Sad: a book for mad, sad and glad days. Lagom, 2018. By Maggy Van Eijk. ISBN 978-1911600732.
- Couch Fiction: A Graphic Tale of Psychotherapy. Penguin Life, 2020. By Philippa Perry. ISBN 9780241461785.
