= The School of Life =

Social media company about self help

- Traded as: Three 13 Solutions, Campus London LLP, ELOE Limited, STOA Limited.
- Founded: 2008; 18 years ago
- Founders: Alain de Botton, Sophie Howarth
- Headquarters: London, England
- Website: www.theschooloflife.com

The School of Life is a British multinational social media company founded in 2008 by British author and public speaker Alain de Botton. The company is headquartered in London. It publishes various materials dealing with the topics of anxiety management, emotional intelligence, relationships, work, creativity, and spirituality. The company also offers talks, workshops, and counseling services.

== History ==
The School of Life was founded in 2008 by Alain de Botton and Sophie Howarth. Its publishing arm was launched in 2016, with books produced by a content team, some of which were (in 2023) training to be therapists.

== Publishing ==
As of 2016, The School of Life owns a publishing press named "The School of Life Press." As of 2025, the company's website sells 98 titles in its "books" category, some of which are workbooks.

=== Books (incomplete selection) ===
- Great Thinkers (2016)
- Relationships (2017)
- Why You Will Marry the Wrong Person (2018)
- How to Overcome Your Childhood (2018)
- Anxiety (2019)
- Big Ideas for Curious Minds (2019)
- What They Forgot to Teach You at School (2020)
- The Good Enough Parent (2021)
- On Self Hatred (2022)
- How Modern Media Destroys Our Minds (2022)
- Big Ideas From Literature (2024)

== Reception ==
The company has been criticized for its representations of philosophers and philosophical arguments. The Los Angeles Review of Books criticized a series of books by the School of Life as being a "vortex of jargon pitched somewhere between the banal banter of daytime talk shows and the schedule for a nightmarish New Age retreat." Professor Hans-Georg Moeller of the University of Macau has criticized the School's video on Lao Tzu, stating that it used fabricated quotes and misrepresented the Tao Te Ching.

The New Republic criticised The School of Life's self-help books for being poorly written and pretentious with little or no useful insight.

The philosophy blog, Erraticus, praised the company for its critiques of romanticism and efforts to foster emotional intelligence using philosophy, arguing that The School of Life offers "self-help for those who might need a bit more engagement with the intellect to consider the complete living that comes with also employing our faculties that operate from the neck down."
