= Sandi Bogle =

English television personality

- Born: Sandy Channer; 1965 (age 60–61); South London, England
- Occupations: Television personality; singer
- Years active: 2013–present
- Television: Gogglebox; Celebrity Big Brother; Celebrity Fit Farm; Famous and Fighting Crime
- Relatives: Naomi Campbell (cousin)

Sandi Bogle
- Genres: Soul; R&B
- Labels: DeeVu Records

Sandy Channer, better known as Sandi Bogle, is an English television personality who is notable for appearing on shows including Celebrity Big Brother, Celebrity Fit Farm, Famous and Fighting Crime and Gogglebox.

== Life and career ==
Bogle was born in south London. She appeared in Gogglebox from the first series until the eighth series, a period lasting from 2013 until 2016. Bogle returned to Gogglebox in 2023, for a one off special episode, celebrating the 10th anniversary of the show.

In 2016, she released her debut single, "Casanova", on DeeVu Records.

== Personal life ==
Bogle is a cousin of Naomi Campbell, who featured in a charity special of Gogglebox.
