= List of people from Middlesbrough =

People from Middlesbrough, North Yorkshire, England

This is a list of people from Middlesbrough, a town in North Yorkshire, England. They include actors, comedians, artists, television presenters, footballers and rugby players. This list is arranged alphabetically by surname:

Table of contents:
A B C D E F G H I J K L M N O P Q R S T U V W X Y Z
Without biographies • See also • References

== A ==
- Abbey Altson, artist
- Matty Appleby, (born 1972) footballer, played for Newcastle United, Oldham Athletic, and Darlington F.C.
- Fred Appleyard, visual artist
- James Arthur, musician
- John Archer, magician/comedian
- Ron Aspery, (1946–2003) musician
- Bill Athey, cricketer

== B ==
- Roland Carl Backhouse, computer scientist
- Jack Bandeira, actor
- Andrew Baggett, rugby union player
- Ian Bailey, retired football player
- John Baines, Olympic bobsledder
- Pat Barker's debut novel Union Street was set on the thoroughfare of the same name in the town
- Thelma Barlow, (born 1929) actress, starred in Coronation Street as Mavis Wilton from 1971 to 1997
- Peter Beagrie, footballer
- Florence Bell, (1851–1930) writer of the classic study, At The Works (1907), gives a picture of the area at the turn of the 20th century. She also edited the letters of her stepdaughter Gertrude Bell (1868–1926), which has been continuously in print since 1927
- Stephen Bell, footballer
- Adrian Bevington, The Football Association's former Director of Communications
- Sean Blowers, actor
- Henry Bolckow, industrialist
- Roy Chubby Brown, comedian
- Ali Brownlee, (1959–2016) radio presenter

== C ==
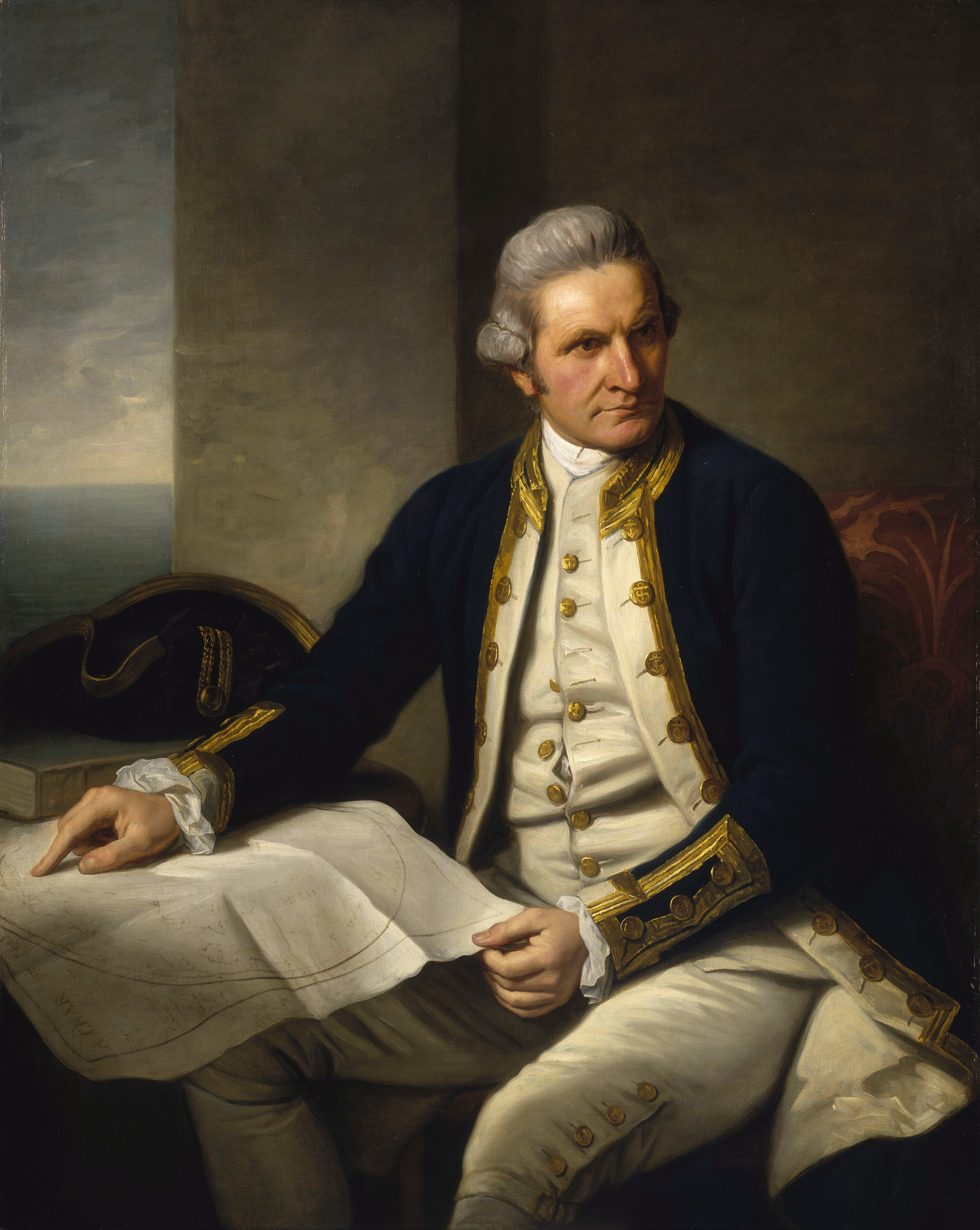
Captain James Cook, portrait by Nathaniel Dance, c. 1775, National Maritime Museum, Greenwich

- Elizabeth Carling, actress
- Jacky Carr, footballer
- Maud Chadburn was one of the earliest women in the United Kingdom to pursue a career as a surgeon. She also co-founded the South London Hospital for Women and Children in 1912 with fellow surgeon Eleanor Davies-Colley
- Alethea Charlton, actress
- Brian Clough, (1935–2004) footballer and manager, Played for Middlesbrough F.C. from 1955 to 1961 and managed Derby County, Leeds United and Nottingham Forest
- Kevin Connelly, comedian
- Geoff Cook, cricketer
- Captain James Cook (1728–1779) the world-famous explorer, navigator, and cartographer was born in Marton, now a suburb of Middlesbrough
- Chris Corner, musician
- Mark Clemmit BBC Sport reporter

== D ==
- Caroline Dale, classical and pop cellist
- Wally K Daly, writer
- David Daniell, former junior World and European track cycling champion
- Martin Daniels, magician
- Paul Daniels, born Newton Edward Daniels (1938–2016) magician, presenter and entertainer
- Billy Day, (1936–2018) footballer, played for Middlesbrough F.C during the 1950s and 60s
- Preeti Desai, actress and model, former Miss Great Britain (2007)
- Jerry Desmonde, (1908–1967) actor, who starred in The Early Bird with Norman Wisdom
- Paul C. Doherty, author, educator, historian and lecturer
- Monica Dolan, actress
- Liam Donaldson, (b 1949) Chief Medical Officer for England
- Chris Dooks, visual artist
- Stewart Downing, footballer
- Tom Dresser, (1892–1992), Middlesbrough's first Victoria Cross recipient during the First World War
- Paul Drinkhall, Olympic table tennis player
- Glen Durrant, darts player

== E ==
- Joan Eadington, writer of The Jonny Briggs series of books, later to become a BBC Children's TV series of the same name, was also based in the town
- Florence Easton, soprano at the New York Met
- Alfred Edwards, (1888–1958) Member of Parliament
- Frank Elgee, (1880-1944) archaeologist, geologist and naturalist

== F ==
- Craig Farrell, (born 1982) footballer
- Graham Farrow, playwright, screenwriter
- Pete Firman, magician
- Ford Madox Ford, (1873–1939) was billeted in Eston during the Great War (1914–18), and his great novel sequence Parade's End is partly set in Busby Hall, Little Busby, near Carlton-in-Cleveland
- Dael Fry, footballer

== G ==
- Vin Garbutt, folk musician
- Ben Gibson, footballer
- Steve Gibson, entrepreneur and owner of Middlesbrough F.C. born in the Park End area
- Gary Gill, footballer
- Neil Grainger, actor
- Alistair Griffin, musician
- Peter Gilchrist, billiards athlete player

== H ==
- Marion Coates Hansen, was an active member of the local Independent Labour Party (ILP). She was a feminist and women's suffrage campaigner, an early member of the militant Women's Social and Political Union (WSPU) and a founder member of the Women's Freedom League (WFL)
- David Harper, antiques expert
- Emily Hesse, visual artist
- Jack Hatfield, (1893–1965) swimmer, known as one of the greatest British swimmers of all time after winning 2 Silvers and 1 Bronze at Stockholm 1912
- Jonathan Hogg, (born 1988) footballer
- Stanley Hollis, (1912–1972), Second World War Victoria Cross recipient
- E. W. Hornung, the creator of the gentleman-crook Raffles
- Keith Houchen, footballer
- Jordan Hugill, footballer

== J ==
- Naomi Jacob, novelist
- Matt Jarvis, footballer
- Ann Jellicoe, writer
- Alyson Jones, Commonwealth Games swimmer
- Jade Jones, paralympic athlete

== K ==
- Chris Kamara, (born 1957) ex-footballer, manager, presenter and analyst on Sky Sports
- Lila Kaye, actress
- Anna Kennedy, disability campaigner
- Richard Kilty, Olympic Athlete (1989–Present)

== L ==
- Graeme Lee, footballer

== M ==
- Wilf Mannion, (1918–2000) footballer
- Faye Marsay, actress
- Herbert McCabe, Roman Catholic and Dominican priest, theologian and philosopher
- Steph McGovern, (born 1982) presenter and journalist
- Richard Milward, writer
- Jade McSorley, model
- Nicky Mohan, footballer
- Glenn Moody, darts player
- Micky Moody, musician
- Dave Morris, comedian
- Bob Mortimer (born 1959), comedian from Acklam
- Peter Murray, founding director of the Yorkshire Sculpture Park

== N ==
- Sir Martin Narey, (1955–present), former Director General of Her Majesty's Prison Service and the chief executive of Barnardo's
- Chris Newton, Olympic cyclist
- Robert Nixon (artist), (1939–2002) artist, who worked on several British comics

== O ==
- Kirsten O'Brien, TV presenter
- Michael O'Hare (chef), chef
- Alan Old, rugby union player
- Chris Old, cricketer
- Richard Old, (1856–1932) model maker resided for most of his life at 6 Ruby Street
- Colin Osborne, darts player

== P ==
- Jamie Parker, actor
- Alan Peacock, footballer
- Steve Peters (psychiatrist), psychiatrist
- Dave Pennington world powerlifting champion
- Liam Plunkett, cricketer
- Mark Proctor, footballer

== Q ==
- Bertha Quinn, (1873 -1951) suffragette, Labour Councillor and recipient of Papal Bene Merenti Medal
- Christopher Quinten, actor

== R ==
- Richard Piers Rayner, visual artist
- Chris Rea, (1951–2025) musician
- Matt Renshaw, cricketer
- Don Revie, (1927–1989) footballer and manager, managed Leeds United and England in the 1970s
- Wendy Richard, (1943–2009) actress, starred in Are You Being Served?, Dad’s Army & EastEnders.
- Stuart Ripley, (born 1967) footballer, played for Middlesbrough F.C, Blackburn Rovers + Southampton
- Paul Rodgers, (born 17 December 1949) singer with Free and Bad Company
- Mike Russell, billiards player
- Marion Ryan, singer
- Jack Rees, professional cyclist and manager
- Anna Raeburn, broadcaster, author and journalist
- Cole Robinson, documentary filmmaker

== S ==
- David Shayler, the ex-spy, journalist and conspiracy theorist, was born in Middlesbrough
- Harold Shepherdson, footballer, played for Middlesbrough.
- Rob Smedley, head of vehicle performance WilliamsF1
- Cyril Smith, (1909–1974) concert pianist.
- Graham Smith, photographer
- Paul Smith (rock vocalist), musician
- James Smurthwaite, (1916–1989) cricketer, played 7 matches for Yorkshire County Cricket Club in 1938 and 1939
- Phil Stamp (born 1975), footballer, played for Middlesbrough F.C from 1993 to 2002, retired at Darlington F.C in 2007

== T ==
- John Telfer, actor
- Bruce Thomas, musician
- William Tillyer, visual artist
- Chris Tomlinson, three times Olympian and former British long jump record holding athlete
- Mackenzie Thorpe, painter
- Pete Trewavas, musician
- Paul Truscott, boxer

== U ==
- Rory Underwood, rugby union player

== V ==
- Simon Vallily, Commonwealth gold medal champion boxer
- John Vaughan, industrialist

== W ==
- Adrian Warburton, air photographer, was played by Alec Guinness in Malta Story
- Frank and Edgar Watts, opened the English Hotel in the Cumberland Gap which gave their hometown's name to Middlesboro, Kentucky, in the United States (Note: Rennick details the importance of the hotel but mistakenly ascribes it to a "Mr. Watts" when in fact it was two brothers involved with Alexander Arthur's development plans.)
- Ellen Wilkinson, was a Member of parliament for Middlesbrough East, and was the first female Minister of Education. She also wrote a novel Clash (1929) which paints a positive picture of "Shireport" (Middlesbrough)
- Tim Williamson, (1894–1943) footballer, made 602 appearances as a goalkeeper for Middlesbrough F.C. and 7 appearances for England
- Aimee Willmott, Olympic swimmer
- Dean John-Wilson, theatre actor
- Jeff Winter, (born 1955) football referee, he took charge of the F.A Cup Final of 2004
- Jonathan Woodgate, (born 1980) footballer + manager
- Charlie Wyke, Footballer born South Bank
