= On Giants Shoulders =

On Giants Shoulders may refer to:

- On Giant's Shoulders, a 1976 book by Marjorie Wallace and Michael Robson about the thalidomide victim Terry Wiles
- On Giant's Shoulders, a 1979 BBC Emmy Award winning drama based on the 1976 book
- On Giants' Shoulders, a 1998 novel by Melvyn Bragg
