= The Man Behind the Curtain =

The Man Behind the Curtain may refer to:

- Wizard of Oz (character), the titular character of the various works in the Wizard of Oz canon
- Other fictional characters, or other things, called by this phrase in allusion to that origin:
  - The Man Behind the Curtain (Lost)
  - The Man Behind the Curtain (Justified)
  - The Man Behind the Curtain (restaurant)
