= Kingdom Come (Bragg novel) =

1980 novel by Melvyn Bragg

- First edition
- Author: Melvyn Bragg
- Language: English
- Series: Cumbrian Trilogy
- Genre: Family Saga
- Publisher: Secker and Warburg
- Publication date: 1980
- Publication place: United Kingdom
- Media type: Print (Hardcover)
- Pages: 352 pp
- ISBN: 0-436-06714-5
- OCLC: 6862830
- Dewey Decimal: 823/.914 19
- LC Class: PR6052.R263 K5 1980
- Preceded by: A Place in England

Kingdom Come is a novel by Melvyn Bragg, first published in 1980. It is the third part of Bragg's Cumbrian Trilogy.

== Plot summary ==
The story moves from Thurston (Bragg's name for Wigton), to London and New York, some time in the 1970s, and follows a series of major disruptions in the life of Douglas Tallentire, a writer and TV producer. Douglas is the son of Joseph Tallentire, the central character of Bragg's A Place in England, and grandson of John Tallentire, central character of The Hired Man.
