= The Adventure of English =

- Created by: Melvyn Bragg
- Starring: Melvyn Bragg
- No. of episodes: 8

Production
- Running time: 45–52 minutes per episode

Original release
- Network: ITV
- Release: 6 November – 30 November 2003

The Adventure of English is a British television series (ITV) on the history of the English language presented by Melvyn Bragg as well as a companion book, written by Bragg. The series ran in November 2003.

The series and the book are cast as an adventure story, or the biography of English as if it were a living being, covering the history of the language from its modest beginnings around 500 AD as a minor Germanic dialect to its rise as a truly established global language.

In the television series, Bragg explains the origins and spelling of many words based on the times in which they were introduced into the growing language that would eventually become modern English.

== Episode list ==
No.	Title	Original release date
1	"Birth of a Language"	6 November 2003
The modern Frisian language is the closest-sounding language to the English used approximately 2,000 years ago, when the people from what is now the north of the Netherlands travelled to what would become England, and pushed the Celtic language—ancestor of modern Welsh—(Celts) to the western side of the island. Words like "blue" can be recognised in the Frisian language. Bragg then discusses how English dialects in certain areas of the United Kingdom were heavily influenced by historical events such as the invasion of the Vikings in the east, contributing words such as "sky" to the English language. Short video clips of discussions with language expert Kathryn A. Lowe appear a number of times during the episode; she offers wonderful insight into the evolution of Anglo-Saxon and Old English.
2	"English Goes Underground"	6 November 2003
Bragg discusses how class also affected the use of English, especially in the time of William the Conqueror and for approximately 300 years after his reign; during this period, only the French language and Latin were used in state affairs and by the aristocracy, while English remained in use with the lower peasant classes.
3	"The Battle for the Language of the Bible"	13 November 2003
In the early-to-mid-14th century, English fought to be the language of the Christian Bible through the efforts of theologian John Wycliffe, who opposed the church's use of a Latin scripture because it prevented most of the population from reading the Bible for themselves. Though Wycliffe died before English became the official language of the Bible, Bragg discusses how his translation eventually led to the transition of various Latin words into the English language, including "emperor", "justice", "profession", "suddenly", or "angel". Eventually, Henry V of England would use his power to create this English-language Bible in the early 15th century. However, the difficulty of creating a common language for all the English dialects in the United Kingdom had to be addressed since there was such an array of spellings and pronunciations. Bragg explains, "The '-ing' participle, as in 'running,' was said as '-and' in the North, '-end' in the East Midlands, and '-ind' in the West Midlands. So 'running' could also be said as 'runnand,' 'runnind,' and 'runnend.'" The number of spellings was even greater, Bragg offers sixteen different ways in which the word meaning "church" had been spelt at the time, including "kerke", "kirc", "chirche", "cherge", and "schyrche." The Chancery had the duty of creating an official spelling for each spoken word, much of which is still used in modern English. Still, the spelling was confusing because of the debates that went on during this period, for example many words wound up being spelt as to their roots like the words "debt" and "doubt" which came from the French language. The word "rhyme" was given an "h" simply because the word "rhythm" already had one. Around this time the Great Vowel Shift also took place, which altered spoken English from the Old English pronunciation to a more modern-sounding form. The possession of an English Bible had become illegal once more and William Tyndale left the country to write his translation of the Bible from the original Hebrew and Greek version, which he published in 1526. Many of his sayings are still used today, including, "scapegoat", "the apple of mine eye", "eat, drink and be merry", and words such as "beautiful" and "zealous". Eventually, Henry VIII of England wished for the creation of an English Bible and a new Church of England so that he could divorce his wife Catherine of Aragon. In time, King James I would create an official version of the Bible which had become wide spread with various versions. This Bible deliberately used words like "ye" and "thou", which were no longer in common use, to create the sense that the words written would appear to be ancient, to have authority.
4	"This Earth, This Realm, This England"	13 November 2003
In Queen Elizabeth I's time, English began to expand to even greater depths. Overseas trade brought new words from France, as well as the now popular swearwords "fokkinge" (fucking), "krappe" (crap), and "bugger" from Dutch, in the 16th century. Sailors also brought all kinds of produce like apricots, bananas, limes, yams, cocoa, potatoes, port wine from Spain and Portugal, chocolate and tomatoes from France as well words from 50 other languages including "coffee", "magazine", and "alcohol" from Arabic countries. "The decade on either side of the year 1600 saw thousands of Latin words come into the English vocabulary of educated people, words like 'excavate,' 'horrid,' 'radius,' 'cautionary,' 'pathetic,' 'pungent,' 'frugal' [...]," states Bragg in this episode. The Inkhorn Controversy, a debate about the English language and where its new words should come from, soon followed. A few scholars, including John Cheke, wished that the language should not use Latin or Greek words to expand the English vocabulary, but rather Anglo-Saxon ones. English eventually obtained its own dictionary. Eight years before Italian and 35 years before French. However, this is a huge difference from the Arabic dictionary, which was made 800 years before and the Sanskrit, which was created nearly 1,000 years before the English. Scholar Katherine Duncan-Jones informs on poet, courtier, and soldier Philip Sidney, who also had a large impact on the English language, introducing phrases like "my better half", "far-fetched", and words such as "conversation", which had previously had another meaning. William Shakespeare's contribution to the English vocabulary is one of the most famous. Over 2,000 words used in modern English were first recorded in his writing, words such as "leapfrog", "assassination", "courtship", and "indistinguishable". Shakespeare's vocabulary included over 21,000 words, his plays translated into 50 different languages, and Bragg states, "The Oxford English dictionary lists a stunning 33,000 Shakespeare quotations."
5	"English in America"	November 2003
Upon landing in North America, settlers encountered Squanto, a native man who had been captured and brought to England to learn English and become a guide. After escaping, Squanto returned to his tribe, which happened to live near the place that the English settlers had created their small village. Among shockingly few other words, the settlers adopted "skunk" and "squash" into their vocabulary from the local language, making clear that they meant to impose their own culture, rather than adopt any other. English began to change, not only in meaning, with "shops" becoming "stores", but also with the variety of accents becoming considerably less in number than in England. In the late 18th and early 19th centuries, Noah Webster wrote what was known as the American Spelling Book, or the Blue Backed Speller, which would become one of the most influential books in the history of the English language, Webster's Dictionary. This dictionary created simpler spellings, eliminating the "u" in words like "colour" and "honour", reducing "axe" to "ax" and reducing double letters to single ones, like in the word "traveller", now spelt "traveler" in the United States. Words with "-re" endings became "-er", and other spellings changed include "defence", which became "defense". Some words that England had dropped were kept in by Americans, such as "deft", "scant", "talented", "likely", and "fall" instead of the newer "autumn". Two thousand words were created in journals of the Lewis and Clark Expedition toward the West, including "rapids", which came from the adjective "rapid". New words to the English language, such as "hickory", "moose", "pecan", and "toboggan" are derived from Indigenous languages. "There are hundreds of names made by combining existing English words," states Bragg, such as "black bear", "bullfrog", "blue jay", and "rednecks", who got their name from the sunburned necks they got from working in the fields. Rednecks couldn't afford steamboat fare, they travelled the water on rafts, using paddles called riffs, and they became known as the "riffraff." Alcohol also added a great deal of words to the English language, "bootlegging" referred to hiding a flat bottle of alcohol in the leg of a boot. "And there were literally hundreds of terms for drunk," says Bragg. "Benjamin Franklin listed 229 of them minted in America, including... 'He's wamble-cropped,' 'He's halfway to concord,' 'He's ate a toad and a half for breakfast,' 'He's groatable,' 'He's globular,' [and] 'He's loose in the hilts.'" Irish settlers brought words and expressions like "smithereens", "speakeasy", "Yes, indeedy", and "No, sirree". Joseph McCoy had the idea to drive his cattle to trains and sell them to the Eastern states, creating a new meaning for the word "cowboy", and he made a lot of money in the process. Because of this, travellers would sometimes introduce themselves with his name, and in turn, he began to introduce himself as "the real McCoy". The Gullah language is a mixture of English and other languages that is thought to be the closest to the one that slaves, brought over from various countries in West Africa and the Caribbean, spoke in the 18th and early 19th centuries. Words like "banana", "zebra", "gorilla", "samba", and "banjo" were incorporated into English from the slaves living on plantations. The stripped-down grammar used in variations of English, like Gullah, is common when different languages come together. However, slave-owners took this to mean that they had lesser intelligence, when in reality their slaves were ultimately contributing words to the English language.
6	"Speaking Proper"	November 2003
The Age of Reason began, and English scholars of mathematics and science like Isaac Newton started publishing their books in English instead of Latin. Jonathan Swift would attempt to save the English language from perpetual change, followed by Samuel Johnson who would write the A Dictionary of the English Language, made up of 43,000 words and definitions, written in seven years and published in 1755. Though the upper and lower classes found no reason to change or improve their grammar, the middle class used it to their advantage in joining polite society. William Cobbett, a son of the lower middle class and writer of Rural Rides, advising those who wish to rise above their station that writing and speaking properly was essential. As English began to replace Gaelic in Scotland it took on its own character, using "bonnie" from the French "bon" and "kolf" from the Dutch for "club", the probable origin for "golf". Several other words came from Gaelic, including "ceilidh", "glen", "loch", and "whisky". Pronunciation became an issue all over the United Kingdom, as some sounds could be spelt in several different ways, while one spelling could have several articulations. Irish actor Thomas Sheridan wrote British Education, a book that attempted to educate all English speakers in the proper pronunciation of words. However, some Scots were offended that their speech might be considered second-class and the Scottish poet Robert Burns, son of a poor farmer, became the hero of the Scottish language. William Wordsworth also became a champion of the ordinary peoples' English, suggesting that poetry need not be written using haughty vocabulary. The turn of the 19th century marked a period when women were more educated and their speech and literacy improved. Novels were thought to be a frivolous occupation for females until Jane Austen wrote about the capabilities of such works in her own novels; her works were highly proper, often using words like "agreeable", "appropriate", "discretion", and "propriety". Then came the Industrial Revolution and the language that came along with it. The steam engine changed the meaning of words like "train", "locomotive", and "tracks" to be associated with the new technology. Along with this age came a change of social situation; the term "slum" came into use, and Cockney rhyming slang became a new form of speech for those in the lower class.
7	"The Language of Empire"	November 2003
British trade and colonisation spread the English language. In India, scholar William Jones finds some English words already present in Sanskrit. Convicts land in Australia, blending London criminal slang and Aboriginal words into a new dialect. Jamaicans reclaim patois.
8	"Many Tongues Called English, One World Language"	November 2003
Today, English is a worldwide language. What is its future? Could it end up like Latin?

== DVD ==
A two-disc DVD set of the mini-series was released on 2 June 2009 with an overall runtime of 405 minutes.

== See also ==
- History of the English language
- The Story of English
