= Cate Haste =

English author (1945–2021)

Catherine Haste
- Born: Catherine Haste; 6 August 1945; Leeds, England
- Died: 29 April 2021 (aged 75)
- Education: University of Sussex; University of Manchester
- Occupations: Author; historian; director
- Spouse: Melvyn Bragg (m. 1973; div. 2018)
- Children: 2

Catherine Haste (6 August 1945 – 29 April 2021), was an English author, biographer, historian and documentary film director, who worked freelance for major television networks in the UK and US over a period of 40 years.

== Early life ==
Haste was born in Leeds, one of three surviving daughters of Margaret (née Hodge) and Eric Haste. She spent part of her childhood in Australia from age four before returning to England seven years later. Haste attended Thornbury Grammar School in Bristol before going on to study English at the University of Sussex, graduating in 1966. She then pursued a Postgraduate Diploma in Adult Education at the Victoria University of Manchester.

== Television documentaries ==
Haste directed political and historical documentaries and series, including Munich: The Peace of Paper. For Cold War, Jeremy Isaacs' 24-part series, Haste directed five films. She directed Flashback TV's Hitler's Brides about women in Nazi Germany; produced Death of a Democrat in Secret History, the series broadcast by Channel 4; and Married to the Prime Minister, presented by Cherie Blair, the wife of the then Prime Minister, Tony Blair.

== Books ==
Haste's first book, Keep the Home Fires Burning (1977), was described by journalist Phillip Knightley as: "One can only hope that this important book will make it more difficult for any British government so deeply to deceive its people ever again." Maureen Freely wrote that Rules of Desire (1997) was "as diverting and as suggestive as a very good novel.... temperate, balanced, subtle and humane". The Daily Telegraph critic wrote that Nazi Women: Hitler's Seduction of a Nation (2001) "opens up the bizarre moral universe of the Third Reich ....at once comprehensible and compelling, and at times deeply moving. It is media history at its best." The prize-winning Sheila Fell: A Passion for Paint (2010), a biography/monograph of the Cumbrian Expressionist landscape painter, signalled Haste's shift to biography and was, according to Andrew Lambirth, "a handsome, slim volume ....elegantly and deftly put together".

== Personal life and death ==
Haste was married from 1973 to 2018 to the broadcaster Melvyn Bragg, whom she met at a protest. The couple had two children. In June 2016 it was reported that they had separated amicably, and that Bragg now shared a home with former film assistant Gabriel Clare-Hunt, with whom he had an affair that began in 1995. The marriage was dissolved in 2018. She was a member of English PEN, the British Academy of Film and Television Arts (BAFTA), the Writers' Guild of Great Britain and Directors UK (formerly Directors Guild of Great Britain), and had been a trustee of Index on Censorship and World Film Collective.

She lived in Hampstead, north London, and like her former husband was a member of the Labour Party. She died from cancer in April 2021, aged 75.

== Bibliography ==
- Passionate Spirit: The Life of Alma Mahler
- Craigie Aitchison: A Life in Colour
- Sheila Fell: A Passion for Paint
- Clarissa Eden A Memoir: From Churchill to Ede (ed.)
- The Goldfish Bowl, with Cherie Booth
- Nazi Women: Hitler's Seduction of a Nation
- Rules of Desire
- Keep The Home Fires Burning

== Filmography ==
- Married to the Prime Minister (Flashback TV for Channel 4) 2005
- Hitler's Brides (Flashback TV for Channel 4) 2000; part of series titled Nazi Women
- Millennium (Jeremy Isaacs Productions/CNN/BBC) 1999
- Cold War (CNN) 1998
- Cold War (Jeremy Isaacs Productions/CNN/BBC2) 1996–98; 24-part series
- Secret History: Death of a Democrat (Brook Associates for Channel 4/Arts and Entertainment)
- Munich: The Peace of Paper... (Brook Associates for Thames Television/ WGBH, Boston) 1988
