= The Man Behind the Curtain (restaurant) =

Coordinates: 53°47′53.7″N 1°32′21.8″W

The Man Behind The Curtain

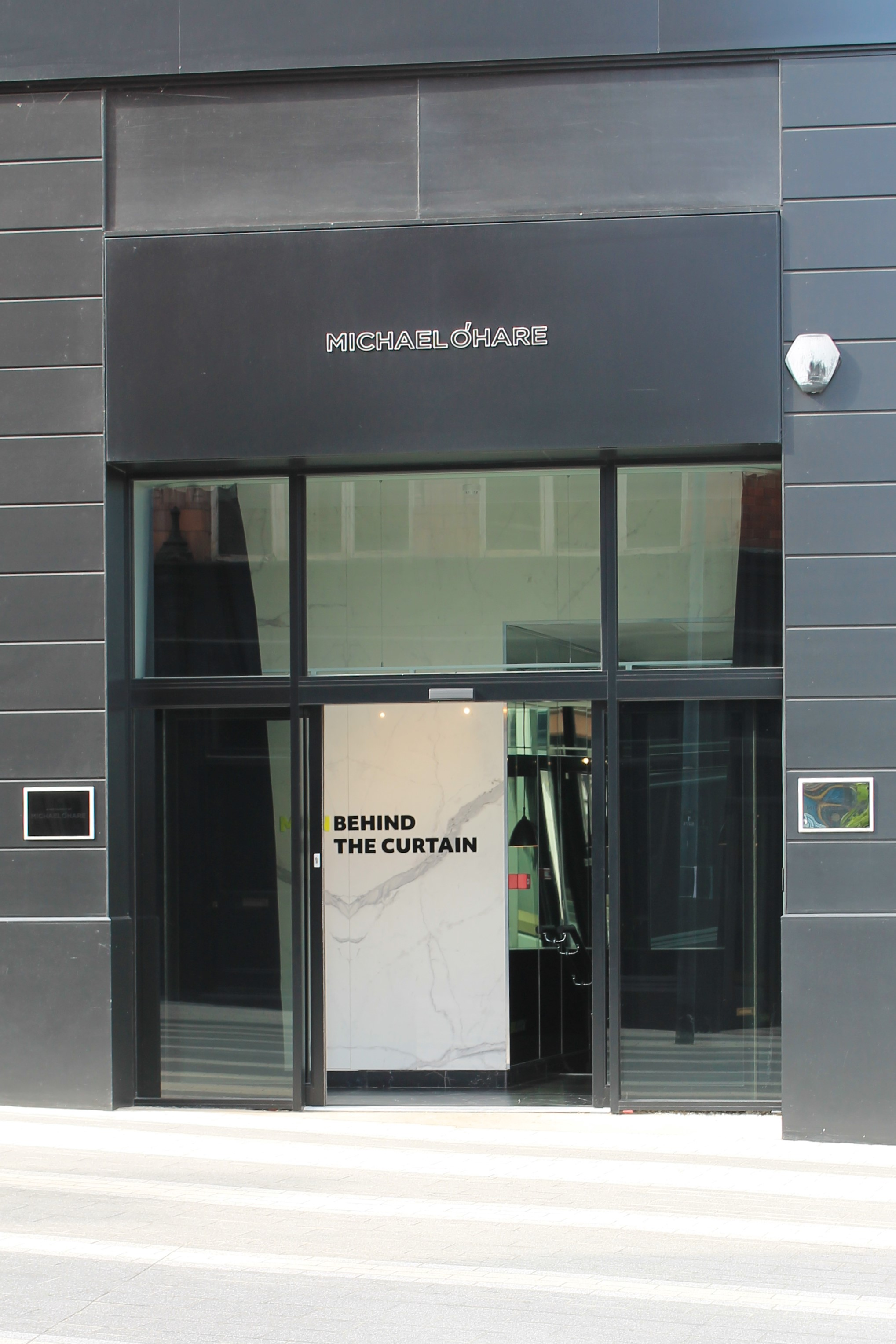
- Interactive map of The Man Behind The Curtain

Restaurant information
- Established: 2014
- Owner: Michael O'Hare
- Head chef: Michael O'Hare
- Food type: Modernist cuisine
- Dress code: Jacket preferred; no sportswear
- Rating: (Michelin Guide); AA Rosettes
- Location: 68-78 Vicar Lane, Leeds, LS1 7JH, England
- Seating capacity: 40
- Reservations: Yes
- Website: Official website

The Man Behind The Curtain was a restaurant in Leeds, West Yorkshire, England, which was opened in 2014 by chef Michael O'Hare, before closing in 2023. The restaurant had a reputation for modern and often unusual food, with modern and artistic presentation. It was awarded a Michelin star in October 2015, and three AA Rosettes in 2016, following in the footsteps of three other Leeds restaurants to hold a Michelin star: Pool Court on the Calls (1996–2005); Rascasse on Water Lane (1997–2000); and Guellar (2002).

== Overview ==
O'Hare had previously worked as the head chef at The Blind Swine in York, but considered Leeds a more suitable location for high-end dining and opened The Man Behind The Curtain in 2014. The restaurant was located on Vicar Lane above Flannels clothes shop and took its name from a line in The Wizard of Oz - 'pay no attention to that man behind the curtain'. After opening the restaurant without a name, O'Hare said: "I get a lot of people asking me if I'm the man behind the curtain. You can't stop it, but you can mock it." During its tenure it was the only restaurant in Leeds which held a Michelin star.

The restaurant seated up to forty people and was decorated in artwork by O'Hare's friend Schoph and featured sculptures by Gareth Griffiths. O'Hare described the food and ambience of the restaurant as not "particularly based on what I wanted, but on what I hated and didn’t want."

=== Menu ===
After opening, The Man Behind The Curtain soon gained a reputation for very modern and often unusual dishes, including olives wrapped in edible cellophane, salt and vinegar ox cheek, and chocolate pudding and pork rinds. The dishes also had imaginative names, such as 'The Insecurity of Postmen in Oakley Sunglasses' and 'Inception of a Spacecat in Black'. O'Hare didn't consider himself to have been inspired by anyone, saying "I don’t think you have to say 'I am inspired by 'X'... I want things first and foremost to look great. Anyone [at this level] can make something taste nice". He was also keen not to draw comparisons to Noma, having worked there under acclaimed chef René Redzepi, saying "it's not what we are doing here". The Man Behind The Curtain served a twelve-course dégustation menu, with O'Hare describing a lot of food as "quite Spanish", because it is the style of food he enjoys eating.

=== Closure ===
In October 2023, O'Hare closed The Man Behind the Curtain, and opened a new restaurant called Psycho Sandbar in early 2024.

== Reception ==
Writing in The Guardian in 2015, Marina O'Loughlin said "there are items that jar" but "if a chef can put a silky foam of potato laced with puffed wild rice on top of an elaborate chocolate dessert and have you laughing out loud as you fight over it (turns out it’s scented like a salt and vinegar crisp), he’s doing something very right." In a review for Great British Chefs, Gemma Harrison wrote, "it blew my mind – and I can’t wait to go back and have it blown all over again." Time Out rated the restaurant 4 stars out of 5 in 2016 and said, although not cheap, "a destination restaurant that’s truly worth a visit."

The restaurant was awarded a Michelin Star after just over one year of opening, and awarded three AA Rosettes in September 2016.

== See also ==
- List of Michelin starred restaurants
