= The South Bank Show =

UK arts TV programme (1978–2010, 2012–2023)

- Genre: Arts
- Presented by: Melvyn Bragg (1978–2023)
- Opening theme: Variation on Paganini's "24th Caprice" by Andrew Lloyd Webber
- Country of origin: United Kingdom
- Original language: English
- No. of series: 45
- No. of episodes: 805 (+ 3 specials)

Production
- Running time: 60mins (inc. adverts)
- Production company: LWT

Original release
- Network: ITV
- Release: 14 January 1978 – 30 May 2010
- Network: Sky Arts
- Release: 27 May 2012 – 29 August 2023

The South Bank Show is a British television arts magazine series originally produced by London Weekend Television and broadcast on ITV between 1978 and 2010. A new version of the series began 27 May 2012 on Sky Arts. Conceived, written, and presented by former BBC arts broadcaster Melvyn Bragg, the show aims to bring both high art and popular culture to a mass audience. In 2023, the series came to an end when it was announced that Bragg would be leaving the series after 45 years.

== History ==
=== ITV (1978–2010) ===
The programme was a replacement for Aquarius, the arts series which had been running since 1970. Presenter Melvyn Bragg was already well known for his arts broadcasting on BBC television, notably Monitor and BBC Two's The Lively Arts. It first aired on 14 January 1978, covering many subjects, including Germaine Greer, Gerald Scarfe and Paul McCartney. It is the longest continuously running arts programme on UK television. From the beginning the series' intent was to mix high art and popular culture. This has remained, and the programme has always focused predominantly on art of the 20th and 21st centuries.

For much of its life, the show was produced by London Weekend Television (LWT) for the ITV network.

In May 2009, ITV announced that the show was to come to an end. Although it was originally reported that the show was ending due to Bragg's retirement, Bragg later made it clear that he decided to leave after they ended the show, and thought ending it was a mistake; according to him, "they've killed the show, so I thought, I'll go as well."

On Monday 28 December 2009 the final ITV edition of The South Bank Show was broadcast, featuring The Royal Shakespeare Company as its subject. Melvyn Bragg announced on this programme that, after ITV's last South Bank Show Awards in January 2010, there would be a series of ten The South Bank Show Revisited programmes transmitted in early 2010, featuring updates on previous South Bank Show subjects.

The production archive for the ITV series, including unaired footage, is housed at the University of Leeds.

ITV had 33 series with 743 episodes, from 1978 until 2010.

=== Sky Arts (2012–2023) ===
In July 2010, it was revealed that Bragg had bought the rights to the brand and had first right of access to The South Bank Show archives. Sky Arts broadcasts South Bank Show archive editions and hosted the South Bank Sky Arts Awards on 25 Jan 2011, presented by Melvyn Bragg, accompanied by a new arrangement of The South Bank Show theme.

Sky Arts revived The South Bank Show with a new series starting 27 May 2012.

From 2012 to 2023 most series only have around 4–6 episodes.

== Theme music and visuals ==
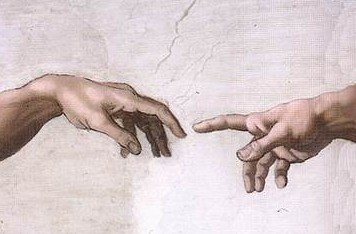
The iconic image of the Hand of God giving life to Adam, used since the series' inception.

The theme music is taken from Andrew Lloyd Webber's Variations composed in 1977 for his brother, the cellist Julian Lloyd Webber. This is based on the theme from Paganini's "24th Caprice". The brand image of the programme is an animated version of a detail from Michelangelo's Sistine Chapel ceiling painting, specifically the image of the Hand of God giving life to Adam. It shows the two hands meeting, generating a lightning bolt.

== Subjects ==
There have been many subjects of the show, including:

1970s

- Paul McCartney in 1978
- Ken Dodd in 1978
- Herbert von Karajan in 1978
- Ingmar Bergman in 1978
- John Peel in 1979
- Satyajit Ray in 1979
- Francis Ford Coppola in 1979
- Rough Trade Records in 1979
- Talking Heads in 1979

1980s

- Arthur Miller in 1980
- Elvis Costello and the Attractions in 1981
- Sir William Walton in 1981
- Patricia Highsmith in 1982
- Steven Spielberg in 1982
- Laurence Olivier in 1982
- Catherine Cookson in 1982
- Werner Herzog in 1982
- Peter Gabriel in 1982
- Julian Lloyd Webber in 1982
- Gene Hackman in 1983
- Oscar Peterson in 1984
- Anthony Caro in 1984
- Weather Report in 1984
- Elisabeth Vellacott in 1984
- Sir Alec Guinness in 1985
- Francis Bacon in 1985
- Simon Rattle in 1985
- John Cleese in 1986
- Michala Petri in 1986
- Fay Godwin in 1986
- Anthony Green in 1987
- Maria Callas in 1987
- Eric Clapton in 1987
- The Smiths in 1987
- Penguin Cafe Orchestra in 1987
- Big Joe Duskin in 1988
- John Houseman in 1988
- Paul Bowles in 1988
- Ben Elton in 1989
- John Zorn in 1989
- Robert Redford in 1989

1990s

- Mark Morris Dance Group in 1990
- Pet Shop Boys in 1990
- Terry Gilliam in 1991
- Stan Laurel in 1991
- Douglas Adams in 1992
- Sir Richard Attenborough in 1992
- George Formby in 1992
- Sgt Pepper's Lonely Hearts Club Band in 1992
- Viviana Durante in 1992
- Anthony Hopkins in 1992
- Billy Connolly in 1992 and 2010
- Sylvie Guillem in 1993
- Paul Simon in 1993
- Clive Barker in 1994
- David Mamet in 1994
- Coronation Street in 1995
- Miriam Makeba in 1995
- Clint Eastwood in 1995
- k. d. lang in 1995
- Sting in 1996
- John Galliano in 1996
- Elaine Paige in 1996
- Marlene Dietrich in 1996
- Sir John Mills in 1996
- Bee Gees in 1997
- Björk in 1997
- Iain Banks in 1997
- Scanner in 1997
- Gillian Wearing/Gary Hume in 1998
- Will Self in 1998
- Bee Gees in 1999
- Cher in 1999
- Blur in 1999
- Tracey Emin in 1999

2000s

- Judith Weir in 2001
- Bernie Taupin in 2002
- Juan Diego Florez in 2002
- Ewan McGregor in 2003
- Dance Theatre of Harlem in 2004
- Ronnie Wood in 2004
- Sir Malcolm Arnold in 2004
- The Darkness in 2004
- John Lennon's jukebox in 2004
- Iggy Pop in 2004
- Little Britain in 2005
- Alan Bennett in 2005
- Manga in 2006
- Jacqueline Wilson in 2006
- Dusty Springfield in 2006
- Steve Reich in 2006
- J. G. Ballard in 2006
- George Michael in 2006
- Grayson Perry in 2006
- Gerhard Richter in 2006
- Jarvis Cocker in 2007
- Victoria Wood in 2007
- June Whitfield in 2007
- Annie Lennox in 2007
- Eric Clapton in 2007
- The Nutcracker (ballet) in 2007
- Nick Park in 2007
- Tim Burton in 2008
- Liza Minnelli in 2008
- James Bond in 2008
- Will Young in 2009
- Peter Kosminsky in 2009
- The Cambridge Footlights in February 2009
- The Wagner family in September 2009
- Coldplay in September 2009
- Disney Pixar in October 2009
- Elbow in November 2009
- The Royal Shakespeare Company in December 2009

2010s

- Jackie Kay in 2016
- Tracey Ullman in 2018
- Jed Mercurio in 2019

== Directors ==
Directors who have made editions of the programme include:

- Rosie Alison
- Irshad Ashraf
- Jack Bond
- John Bulmer
- Chris Dooks
- Don Featherstone
- Andy Harries
- Mary Harron
- James Ivory
- Margy Kinmonth
- Ken Loach
- Jeremy Marre
- Tony Palmer
- Ken Russell
- Susan Shaw

== Podcast ==
From 18 September 2006, ITV released podcast of the interviews from the show, including extra material not included in the broadcast editions.

== Awards ==
The programme has been awarded more than 110 awards (including 12 BAFTAs, 5 Prix Italia and 4 RTS Awards). Pat Gavin's animated title sequences have won two BAFTAs.

== Parodies ==
From series 3-4 (along with the New Year's special), the comedy series Dead Ringers often parodied The South Bank Show. It does this in a series of sketches called South Bank, a cross between The South Bank Show and the American cartoon South Park, set in the South Bank of London. In these sketches, Melvyn Bragg is Stan Marsh, Alan Yentob is Kyle Broflovski, Mark Lawson is Eric Cartman and Kenneth Branagh is Kenny McCormick.

A sketch in The Smell of Reeves and Mortimer featured Vic Reeves as Melvyn Bragg (with felt-tip marks on his face) presenting a feature on fictional folk singers Mulligan and O'Hare. Reeves depicts Bragg as an unlikely A-Team obsessive.

Harry Enfield's TV film Norbert Smith - a Life is a parody edition of The South Bank Show.

Ricky Gervais and Stephen Merchant's second series of Extras featured a reference to a fictional episode of The South Bank Show focused on madcap children's television presenters Dick and Dom.

Private Eye tends to parody Melvyn Bragg's name, and Spitting Image would rather accentuate his nasal accent. As Spitting Image was often aired immediately before The South Bank Show, episodes would often end with a send-up of Bragg, most notably in one episode having him advise viewers to switch off their televisions to avoid watching it.

Benny Hill once parodied Bragg in a 1978 episode of The Benny Hill Show as Melvyn Dragg. The name of the show was also parodied, and it was called "The South Blank Show."

== Transmission ==
| Series | Episodes | Broadcast date | | Network |
| Series | Episodes | First aired | Last aired | Network |
|---|---|---|---|---|
| 1 | 24 | 14 January 1978 | 22 July 1978 | ITV |
| 2 | 24 | 26 November 1978 | 24 June 1979 | ITV |
| 3 | 19 | 2 December 1979 | 6 July 1980 | ITV |
| 4 | 26 | 9 November 1980 | 28 June 1981 | ITV |
| 5 | 27 | 1 November 1981 | 30 May 1982 | ITV |
| 6 | 26 | 17 October 1982 | 12 June 1983 | ITV |
| 7 | 23 | 16 October 1983 | 24 June 1984 | ITV |
| 8 | 26 | 7 October 1984 | 16 June 1985 | ITV |
| 9 | 24 | 6 October 1985 | 4 May 1986 | ITV |
| 10 | 26 | 5 October 1986 | 19 April 1987 | ITV |
| 11 | 25 | 4 October 1987 | 24 April 1988 | ITV |
| 12 | 24 | 25 September 1988 | 24 March 1989 | ITV |
| 13 | 25 | 17 September 1989 | 22 April 1990 | ITV |
| 14 | 23 | 2 September 1990 | 29 March 1991 | ITV |
| 15 | 25 | 15 September 1991 | 14 June 1992 | ITV |
| 16 | 25 | 4 October 1992 | 22 August 1993 | ITV |
| 17 | 26 | 12 September 1993 | 29 May 1994 | ITV |
| 18 | 22 | 18 September 1994 | 25 June 1995 | ITV |
| 19 | 20 | 10 September 1995 | 28 July 1996 | ITV |
| 20 | 21 | 15 September 1996 | 20 July 1997 | ITV |
| 21 | 22 | 5 October 1997 | 30 August 1998 | ITV |
| 22 | 16 | 8 November 1998 | 4 April 1999 | ITV |
| 23 | 21 | 26 September 1999 | 2 July 2000 | ITV |
| 24 | 25 | 1 October 2000 | 19 August 2001 | ITV |
| 25 | 19 | 7 October 2001 | 4 August 2002 | ITV |
| 26 | 26 | 13 October 2002 | 21 September 2003 | ITV |
| 27 | 13 | 19 October 2003 | 27 June 2004 | ITV |
| 28 | 22 | 22 August 2004 | 15 May 2005 | ITV |
| 29 | 19 | 7 August 2005 | 11 June 2006 | ITV |
| 30 | 25 | 10 September 2006 | 29 July 2007 | ITV |
| 31 | 19 | 2 September 2007 | 13 July 2008 | ITV |
| 32 | 15 | 13 September 2008 | 24 May 2009 | ITV |
| 33 | 21 | 14 September 2009 | 30 May 2010 | ITV |
| 34 | 4 | 28 May 2012 | 18 June 2012 | Sky Arts |
| 35 | 6 | 18 April 2013 | 23 May 2013 | Sky Arts |
| 36 | 6 | 22 May 2014 | 26 June 2014 | Sky Arts |
| 37 | 6 | 24 February 2015 | 15 July 2015 | Sky Arts |
| 38 | 6 | 10 June 2016 | 20 July 2016 | Sky Arts |
| 39 | 6 | 17 July 2017 | 27 August 2017 | Sky Arts |
| 40 | 6 | 7 November 2018 | 12 December 2018 | Sky Arts |
| 41 | 4 | 5 May 2019 | 6 August 2019 | Sky Arts |
| 42 | 4 | 20 November 2020 | 20 December 2020 | Sky Arts |
| 43 | 4 | 24 June 2021 | 15 July 2021 | Sky Arts |
| 44 | 4 | 13 July 2022 | 3 August 2022 | Sky Arts |
| 45 | 5 | 5 July 2023 | 29 August 2023 | Sky Arts |

Specials
| Special | Broadcast date | Network |
|---|---|---|
| British Comedy Special | 14 November 1994 | ITV |
| 30th Anniversary Special | 14 January 2018 | Sky Arts |
| Vincent and Theo | 30 September 2019 | Sky Arts |
