= 12 Books That Changed the World =

2006 book by Melvyn Bragg

First edition (publ. Hodder & Stoughton)

12 Books That Changed the World is a book by Melvyn Bragg, published in 2006. Upon its release, it was screened on ITV, and received generally negative reviews.

== Synopsis ==
In the book Bragg discusses twelve British books that he contends changed the world. These books are as follows:

- Philosophiæ Naturalis Principia Mathematica by Isaac Newton
- Married Love by Marie Stopes
- Magna Carta
- Book of Rules of Association Football
- On the Origin of Species by Charles Darwin
- On the Abolition of the Slave Trade
- A Vindication of the Rights of Woman by Mary Wollstonecraft
- Experimental Researches in Electricity by Michael Faraday
- Richard Arkwright's patent specification for his "Spinning Machine"
- The King James Bible
- The Wealth of Nations by Adam Smith
- The First Folio by William Shakespeare

== Release ==
12 Books That Changed the World was first published in the United Kingdom in 2006 and was accompanied by a four part special screened on ITV.

== Reception ==
Upon release 12 Books That Changed the World received criticism from reviewers who noted that several items in the list were not considered books. Others also criticized the list as focusing on works put out by white British men, as well as the length of the list. Miles Kingston noted that the list was absent of any foreign texts. Laurie Taylor commented on the criticism in a review for The Independent, writing that he was "put off by the assumption that anyone who doesn't whole-heartedly join Bragg in his latest popularising endeavour is something of a spoilsport or dangerous elitist." Christopher Howse of The Daily Telegraph was also critical, compiling a list of works that he felt had more of a global impact.

Tim Cribb of the South China Morning Post panned the book, writing that it "reads like a rehash of his television treatment for the series of the same name" and that "Even the illustrations look like carefully selected stills from the visual sequences that accompany his dialogue". Paul Callan of the Daily Express was also critical, stating that "selecting 12 books that changed the world is the stuff of which pretentious dinner parties are made".
