= A Place in England =

1970 novel by Melvyn Bragg

- First edition
- Author: Melvyn Bragg
- Language: English
- Series: Cumbrian Trilogy
- Genre: Family saga
- Publisher: Secker & Warburg
- Publication date: 1970
- Publication place: United Kingdom
- Media type: Print (Hardcover)
- Pages: 247 pp
- ISBN: 0-436-06706-4
- OCLC: 124366
- Dewey Decimal: 823/.9/14
- LC Class: PZ4.B8125 Pl PR6052.R263
- Preceded by: The Hired Man
- Followed by: Kingdom Come

A Place in England is a novel by Melvyn Bragg, first published in 1970. It is the second part of Bragg's Cumbrian Trilogy.

The story is set predominantly in Thurston (Bragg's name for Wigton), from the 1920s to the 1960s, and follows the life of Joseph Tallentire, a labourer, footman, and eventually publican. Joseph is the son of John Tallentire, the central character of Bragg's The Hired Man, and father of Douglas Tallentire, central character of Kingdom Come.
