= The Hired Man (Bragg novel) =

1969 novel by Melvyn Bragg

- First edition
- Author: Melvyn Bragg
- Language: English
- Series: Cumbrian Trilogy
- Genre: Family saga
- Publisher: Secker and Warburg
- Publication date: 1969
- Publication place: United Kingdom
- Media type: Print (hardcover)
- Pages: 220 pp
- ISBN: 0-436-06705-6
- OCLC: 70821
- Dewey Decimal: 823/.9/14
- LC Class: PZ4.B8125 Hi PR6052.R263
- Followed by: A Place in England

The Hired Man is a novel by Melvyn Bragg, first published in 1969 by Secker and Warburg. It is the first part of Bragg's Cumbrian Trilogy.

The story is set predominantly in the rural area around Thurston (Bragg's name for Wigton, his home town), from the 1890s to the 1920s, and follows the life of John Tallentire, a farm labourer and coal miner. John is the father of Joseph Tallentire, the central character of Bragg's A Place in England, whose son, Douglas Tallentire, is the central character of Kingdom Come.

== Musical adaptation ==
In 1984 The Hired Man was turned into an award-winning musical with Bragg collaborating with Howard Goodall. The musical has been refined over time, including a new song, "Day Follows Day", which was introduced for the 2003 revival at the Salisbury Playhouse. It features characters John and Emily Tallentire, and two periods in their lives. The first opens with a Hiring Fair, where John is employed by Pennington, a local farmer. Emily also has an affair with Pennington's son, Jackson. John finds out while on a hunting trip with his brother, Isaac, and returns and knocks out Jackson. Emily is torn between the two men.

Act 2 begins with May and Harry (John and Emily's children). May is a very naïve 16-year-old and Harry is a brave and sometimes foolish 13-year-old. Time passes, and World War I disrupts the country, John, Isaac and Jackson all serve in the armed forces. Isaac loses his leg and his life is saved by Jackson. After Isaac's return, Harry also enlists. He dies in the war, along with Jackson. Emily finally declares her love for John in a beautiful duet. John goes to work in the mines, and Emily dies during a pit accident. May finds her dead mother, and John walks in to find his wife dead. The company re-assemble and sing the haunting finale sequence.

A concert performance was given in March 1992 at the Palace Theatre in aid of Cancer Relief with additional orchestrations for ten players by John Owen Edwards; the live recording was issued on a 2-CD album.

In 2011 The Hired Man was revived at the Landor Theatre, London, directed by Andrew Keates, with a cast of 17. The production received the 2012 Offie for "Best Musical Production". It has also been performed far from home in Briarcliff Manor, NY. It was revived by the local High School, and gained attention from Melvyn Bragg himself.

In September 2016, a concert production was presented at London's Cadogan Hall, starring Jenna Russell and John Owen-Jones in the roles of Emily and John, and narrated by Bragg himself.

The Musical Youth Company of Oxford staged the show in April 2017, and received several supportive tweets from Howard Goodall. He was unable to attend the show, but sent his parents and brother to watch in his absence.

The show returned to London at the Union Theatre in July 2017. The cast included Ifan Gwilym-Jones as John, Rebecca Gilliland as Emily, Luke Kelly as Jackson, Kara Taylor Alberts as May and Jack McNeill as Harry. The revival was described as "heartfelt but patchy" in a review published in The Stage.

In 2019, the musical was revived once more in the UK, in a co-production by Hull Truck Theatre and Queen's Theatre Hornchurch, in association with Oldham Coliseum. This production was directed by Douglas Rintoul.
