= Tom Wall (artist) =

British landscape painter and educator (1941–1992)

Tom Wall shortly before his death in 1992

Tom Wall (30 May 1941 – 5 October 1992) was a British landscape painter and educator.

== Biography ==
Born in Balham, London, England, Wall moved with his family to Bryhonddu in Wales at the age of 10, later studying at Newport College of Art and the Slade School of Fine Art in London. It is believed that the countryside around Abergavenny inspired his enduring relationship with art and landscape.

Wall spent most of his teaching career at Cleveland College of Art and Design, arriving in 1968 and staying for 23 years, ending up as principal lecturer for art. He retired in August 1991 to devote the rest of his life to his beloved art.

He was described as a "painter of great talent with a remarkable personal vision" by Kenneth Clark, who also said he was "a natural painter who is also a poet".

The major body of Wall's work was entitled "Visionary Landscapes" and he was highlighted as "a true artist on the verge, perhaps of visions so transitive that they become revelations" by the Yorkshire Post. He also produced other series such as "Journey Paintings", "Symphony in Colour" and "Fantasy Landscapes".

His 1985 exhibition at the Warminster Arts Centre (organised by a former pupil, John Henshaw) was nearly a sell-out. One of his largest works in that exhibition (6' × 4') was sold to the local Warminster Hospital where it still hangs.

Wall's last exhibition was held jointly with a former pupil of Cleveland College of Art and Design, Mackenzie Thorpe at St. Martin in the Fields Gallery, London, 28 June – 11 July 1992. Thorpe later said of Wall, "His style (of working) made a great impression on me and was the beginning of what I have gone on to do."

== Exhibitions ==
Wall contributed to the following exhibitions:

- Welsh Arts Council Annual Exhibitions – 1959, 1960, 1961, 1962, 1964
- South Wales Group – 1959, 1960, 1961
- Leicester Galleries, London – Selected work from the South Wales Group – 1961
- Group Show, Cardiff – 1964
- Amolfini Gallery, Bristol – Joint One-Man Show, January – February 1966
- Spring Exhibition Contemporary British Art, Bradford – 1966, 1967
- Winter Exhibition, Ferens Art Gallery, Hull – 1970, 1971
- Welsh Arts Council/South Wales Group, "NOW" Exhibition – 1971
- Teesside College of Art – December 1973
- Chapter Centre for the Arts, Cardiff – October 1974
- Mall Galleries, London – August 1975
- Response Exhibition, 13 Cleveland Artists, Billingham – 1976
- Preston Polytechnic Gallery, Lancaster – April to May 1977
- Sheffield University – July 1978
- Welsh National Eisteddfod – 1980
- Cleveland College of Art – June 1982
- Byre Gallery, Glaisdale – July 1982
- 'Work', Five Artists, Jarrow – 1983
- Hartlepool Art Gallery – 1984
- Warminster Art Centre, Wiltshire – October 1985
- Chandler Gallery, Leyburn – 1990
- John Laing Exhibition, Harrogate – 1992
- St. Martin in the Fields Gallery, London – 1992
- Tennants Gallery, Leyburn – 1993 (posthumously)
- Rennie Hamilton Gallery, Barnard Castle – 2008 (posthumously)
