= The Northern School of Art =

Art school in Middlesbrough, England

The Northern College of Art
- Former names: Cleveland College of Art and Design (CCAD), The Northern School of Art
- Established: 1870; 156 years ago – Middlesbrough School of Art
- Vice-Chancellor: Martin Raby
- Location: Middlesbrough TS1 1AL & Hartlepool TS24 7DR, England; 54.576°N 1.243°W
- Website: northernart.ac.uk

The Northern College of Art is a further and higher education art and design college in Middlesbrough and Hartlepool in the north-east of England. The college was called Cleveland College of Art and Design after the former non-metropolitan county of Cleveland. In 2018, the college changed its name to The Northern School of Art. In 2026, the college separated its two sites, and changed the name of the Middlesbrough campus to The Northern College of Art; the Hartlepool campus remains as The Northern School of Art.

== History and estates ==
Middlesbrough School of Art, on Durham Street, and the nearby Government School of Arts in the Athenaeum on Church Street, West Hartlepool first opened in 1870 and 1874 respectively.

In May 1960, the Green Lane campus based in the Linthorpe area of Middlesbrough was opened by Robin Darwin, then-Principal of the Royal College of Art, and was later extended as Middlesbrough School of Art. The campus closed its doors and re-located to the centre of Middlesbrough in September 2021.

The Northern School of Art is the only specialist art and design college in the north-east of England and one of only three in the country in the further education sector.

== Campuses and buildings ==
The college of art currently has three campuses, one in Middlesbrough, one in Church Square, Hartlepool and a second Hartlepool Campus located on Church Street.

=== Middlesbrough ===
The new £14 million Middlesbrough-based campus opened in September 2021 and is a purpose-built, three-storey building located in the town centre on Newport Road. It is adjacent to a Sainsbury's supermarket and within a short walking distance of both the bus and railway stations. The Middlesbrough campus offers Access to HE, A-levels and UAL Diploma qualifications through a range of creative art & design courses.

=== Hartlepool ===
==== Church Square ====
The college has operated continuously in its present Hartlepool spot since 1938, despite a 1966 fire. It is located off Church Street (A178) at the junction of the A689 (Stockton Street) and A178, and near the railway station.

==== Church Street Campus ====
Opening in 2017, the Church street campus was the first phase of the School's £11 million development in Hartlepool. The new campus is now host to courses such as Commercial Photography, Production Design for Stage and Screen, Film and Theatre Production, Costume design and more.

With the development of the new building came the procurement of nearby bus sheds. The 32,000-square-foot (3,000 m^{2}) sheds will become purpose-built dedicated film and TV sound studios with the aim to boost film and TV production in the north-east and create a major industry hub.

== Courses ==
The Northern College of Art is an institution of both further and higher education, and because of this it has courses aimed at 16-year-old school-leavers all the way through to postgraduate degree level, as well as Saturday club art & design classes.

=== FE courses ===
The college offers a range of A-Level and University of the Arts London Extended Diplomas across the whole art and design spectrum, including Art & Design, Graphic Design, Fine Art, Fashion, Textiles, Costume Design, Photography, 3D design and Illustration & Animation. The college also offers two UAL Level 2 courses and Bronze and Silver Awards.

The College now also offers Acting for Stage and Screen and Film & TV Production as a part of the development of The School's screen industries offer.

The Northern College of Art also offers a Diploma in Foundation Studies in Art & Design, a course traditionally undertaken by A-level students prior to enrolling on an art and design course at university.

=== HE courses ===
At higher education level, The College also offers BA (Hons) and FdA degrees, covering such subjects as textiles, Commercial Photography, Creative Photography, Fine Art, Illustration, Creative film and moving image, Costume Design, Graphic Design, theatre design, Acting, Lighting for stage and screen, vfx, 3D Design and Body Contour Fashion. All higher education courses are validated by the Arts University Bournemouth.

== Notable alumni ==
- Basil Beattie, artist (1955)
- Chris Dooks, South Bank Show TV director (1991)
- Curtis Jobling, designer of Bob the Builder (1994)
- David Coverdale, rock singer
- Graham Smith, photographer
- Narbi Price, artist (1999)
- Mackenzie Thorpe, artist (1979)
- Margaret Green
- Melissa-Jane Daniel, archer
- Paul Smith, musician (1998)
- Richard Milward, author
- Sir Ridley Scott, film director (1958)
- Robert Nixon, cartoonist
- Steve Bell, cartoonist (1970)
- Ted Harrison, Canadian artist (1949)
- Tony Scott, film director
- Tom Wall, artist and lecturer at the college for 23 years until 1991
- William Tillyer, artist (1959)
- Zooey Perry, Premier League Handball player in Oslo, Norway (2016)
- Brian Welsh, filmmaker

== See also ==
- Cleveland Institute of Art, similar-named American institution
