= Cumbrian Trilogy =

Three novels by Melvyn Bragg

The Cumbrian Trilogy comprises three novels by Melvyn Bragg, published between 1969 and 1980.

The story is set predominantly in Thurston (Bragg's name for Wigton), from the 1920s to the 1970s, and follows the lives of John Tallentire, his son Joseph, and his grandson Douglas. These three characters are central to the novels The Hired Man, A Place in England, and Kingdom Come, respectively.

As the family saga unfolds, Bragg sets the constant family characteristics of the protagonists against the flow of historical change.

== List of Books in Series ==
- The Hired Man (1969)
- A Place in England (1970)
- Kingdom Come (1980)
