= Melvyn Bragg on Class and Culture =

- Presented by: Melvyn Bragg
- Country of origin: United Kingdom
- Original language: English
- No. of series: 1
- No. of episodes: 3

Production
- Running time: 60 minutes

Original release
- Network: BBC Two
- Release: 24 February – 9 March 2012

Melvyn Bragg on Class and Culture is a British documentary series about class and popular culture in the United Kingdom from 1911 to 2011. It is presented by Melvyn Bragg and was shown on BBC Two in 2012.

== Episode list ==
No.	Title	Directed by	Producer	Original release date
1	"Episode 1"	Bob Bee	Bob Bee	24 February 2012
2	"Episode 2"	Bob Bee	Gillian Greenwood	2 March 2012
3	"Episode 3"	Archie Powell	Archie Powell	9 March 2012
