= Marie-Elsa Bragg =

English priest and writer (born 1964/65)

Marie-Elsa Roche Bragg (born 1965) is an English writer, Anglican priest and therapist.

== Early life and education ==
Bragg describes herself as "half French, half Cumbrian", but was born in London where she spent her childhood. Her parents are novelist and broadcaster Melvyn Bragg and his first wife, writer and artist Marie-Elisabeth Roche, who died at the family home in Kew, London when Marie-Elsa was aged six.

Her maternal grandfather was Jean Roche (1901–1992) who, together with his wife Andrée Conradi Roche (c1903–1936), was nominated for the Nobel Prize in Medicine for his work on the thyroid gland and was rector of the Sorbonne between 1961 and 1969.

In the late 1990s and early 2000s, Bragg studied aspects of Judaism at Leo Baeck College, Karl Barth and systematic doctrine at King's College London, philosophy and theology at the University of Oxford, and studied for ordination at Ripon College Cuddesdon. She has an MA in prose fiction from the University of East Anglia.

== Work ==
Bragg has written a novel, Towards Mellbreak (Mellbreak is a mountain in Cumbria next to Crummock Water), and a book, Sleeping Letters, which she wrote during a silent retreat and describes as "a mixture of poetry, prose and fragments of un-sent letters to both her mother and father", on the death of her mother when she was a child.

Bragg is a spiritual director, working with groups or individuals. She has been part-time assistant to the Chaplain to the Speaker of the House of Commons; has been a programme director in leadership development at the Said Business School in Oxford; is a director of a coaching and leadership company Westminster Leadership; and has led an interfaith women's project on the difficulties of religious life, among other work. She has worked in a number of London parishes and was a duty chaplain at Westminster Abbey for 10 years. She has a connection with Sénanque Abbey in southern France, and with the religious and literary traditions of the Lake District.

She is co-president of the Words by the Water Literary Festival in Keswick, Cumbria.

== Selected publications ==
- Bragg, Marie-Elsa (2018). Towards Mellbreak. Vintage. ISBN 978-1784705015.
- Bragg, Marie-Elsa R. (2019). Sleeping Letters. Chatto & Windus. ISBN 978-1784743161.
- Roche Bragg, Marie-Elsa (2023) Contributes to Feminist Theologies: Interstices and Fractures – Decolonizing Theology. Rowman & Littlefield. ISBN 978-1978712393
