= Mackenzie Thorpe =

British artist

Mackenzie Thorpe (born 1956 in Middlesbrough, Yorkshire) is a British artist. In 2019 he celebrated 30 years of artistic practice with a world tour, From the Heart, which included the UK in July; he was also appointed as the official artist to 2019 Tour de Yorkshire; was appointed as the 2019 "Welcome to Yorkshire, Official Chelsea Flower show artist”; and unveiled a new temporary public sculpture in his home town of Middlesbrough. His bronze sculpture called 'Waiting for me Dad' was placed next to the Middlesbrough Transporter Bridge. He considers it a tribute to the men and women who have made Middlesbrough great.

Born as the first of seven children, Thorpe initially worked in the local shipyards. However, in 1977, following encouragement of a friend he successfully applied to study art at Cleveland College of Art and Design, where he flourished under the tuition of Tom Wall, going on to study for a Fine Art BA at Byam Shaw College of Art in London from which he graduated in 1982. In 1989 he decided to become a full-time artist, moving from London to Richmond, North Yorkshire, where he opened the Mackenzie Thorpe Arthaus gallery. In 2000 he was awarded an honorary degree of Master of Arts from Teesside University, followed by being was awarded an honorary professorship by Seisa University in Japan in 2019..

His works are associated with a principle of "Art from the heart" – combining tenderness with fervency through his abstract depictions of animals and children. His work is wide-ranging from the accessible 'square sheep' and duffle coat boys to more challenging work focusing on isolation and man's struggle. Much of his work depicts his childhood growing up in Middlesbrough. His auction record of £9,000, paid for his 91 cm square oil on canvas "The Family (Kiss)" was set at Tennant's auction house in Leyburn on 4 March 2009. He and his staff operate through a company, and in 2020 his original artworks were said to cost from £10,000.

He and his wife, Susan, have been married since his twenties, and have children and grandchildren.
