= Melvyn Bragg =

British broadcaster and author (born 1939)

The Right Honourable The Lord Bragg CH HonFRS FRSL FBA
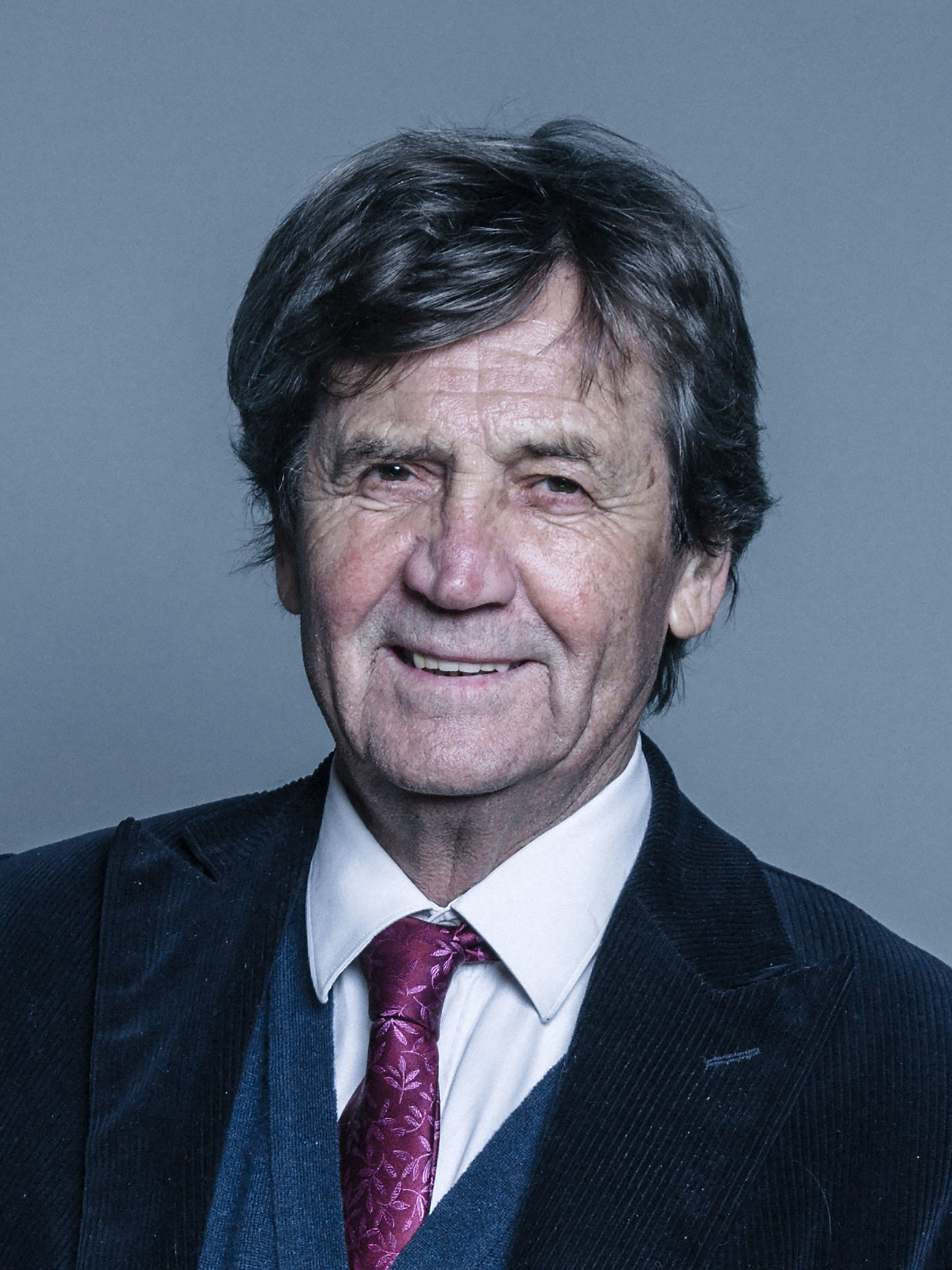
- Official portrait, 2018
- Born: 6 October 1939 (age 87); Carlisle, Cumberland, England
- Education: Wadham College, Oxford
- Occupations: Broadcaster; presenter; interviewer; commentator; novelist; screenwriter
- Years active: 1961–present
- Notable work: In Our Time
- Television: The South Bank Show
- Political party: Labour
- Spouses: Marie-Elisabeth Roche (m. 1961; died 1971) Catherine Haste (m. 1973; div. 2018) Gabriel Clare-Hunt (m. 2019)
- Children: 3; including Marie-Elsa
- Melvyn Bragg's voice Recorded May 2013 from the BBC Radio 4 programme Front Row

Member of the House of Lords
- Lord Temporal
- Life peerage 4 August 1998 – 31 March 2026

Melvyn Bragg, Baron Bragg (born 6 October 1939), is an English broadcaster, author, and parliamentarian. Earlier in his career, Bragg worked for the BBC in various roles including presenter, a connection that resumed in 1988 when he began to host Start the Week on BBC Radio 4. He was also the editor and presenter of The South Bank Show (1978–2010, 2012–2023), and served as Chancellor of the University of Leeds from 1999 until 2017.

After his ennoblement in 1998, he switched to presenting the new BBC Radio 4 documentary series In Our Time, an academic discussion radio programme, which has run to more than one thousand broadcast editions and is also a podcast. In September 2025, Bragg announced that he would step down from hosting the show after 27 years.

== Early life ==
Bragg was born on 6 October 1939 in Carlisle and was raised in Wigton, Cumberland, the son of Stanley Bragg, a stock keeper turned publican, and Mary Ethel (née Park), who worked alongside her husband in the pub. Both the Braggs and Parks, Cumberland families, were agricultural labourers, also working at collieries and in domestic service. He was given the name Melvyn by his mother after she saw the actor Melvyn Douglas at a local cinema. He was raised in the small town of Wigton, where he attended the Wigton primary school and later The Nelson Thomlinson Grammar School, where he was Head Boy. He was an only child, born a year after his parents married. His father was away from home serving with the Royal Air Force for four years during the war. His upbringing and childhood experiences were typical of the working-class environment of that era.

When he was a child, he was led to believe that his mother's foster mother was his maternal grandmother. His grandmother had been forced to leave the town owing to the stigma of her daughter being born illegitimately. From the age of 8 until he left for university, his family home was above a pub in Wigton, the Black-A-Moor Hotel, of which his father had become the landlord. Into his teens, he was a member of the Boy Scouts and played rugby in his school's first team. Encouraged by a teacher who had recognised his work ethic, Bragg was one of an increasing number of working-class teenagers of the era being given a path to university through the grammar school system. He studied modern history at Wadham College, Oxford in the late 1950s and early 1960s.

== Career ==
=== Broadcasting ===
Bragg began his career in 1961 as a general trainee at the BBC. He was the recipient of one of only three traineeships awarded that year. He spent his first two years in radio at the BBC World Service, then at the BBC Third Programme and BBC Home Service. He joined the production team of Huw Wheldon's Monitor arts series on BBC Television. He presented the BBC books programme Read All About It (and was also its editor, 1976–77) and The Lively Arts, a BBC Two arts series. He then edited and presented the London Weekend Television (LWT) arts programme The South Bank Show from 1978 to 2010. His interview with playwright Dennis Potter shortly before his death is regularly cited as one of the most moving and memorable television moments ever. His interest in popular music as well as classical is credited with making the arts more accessible and less elitist.

He was Head of Arts at LWT from 1982 to 1990 and Controller of Arts at LWT from 1990. He has made many programmes on BBC Radio 4, including Start the Week (1988 to 1998), The Routes of English (mapping the history of the English language), and In Our Time (1998 to 2025), which in March 2011 broadcast its 500th programme. Bragg's pending departure from the South Bank Show was portrayed by The Guardian as the last of the ITV grandees, speculating that the next generation of ITV broadcasters would not have the same longevity or influence as Bragg or his ITV contemporaries John Birt, Greg Dyke, Michael Grade and Christopher Bland.

In 2012 he brought The South Bank Show back to Sky Arts 1. In December 2012, he began The Value of Culture, a five-part series on BBC Radio 4 examining the meaning of culture, expanding on Matthew Arnold's landmark (1869) collection of essays Culture and Anarchy. In June 2013 Bragg wrote and presented The Most Dangerous Man in Tudor England, broadcast by the BBC. This told the dramatic story of William Tyndale's mission to translate the Bible from the original languages to English. In February 2012, he began Melvyn Bragg on Class and Culture, a three-part series on BBC Two examining popular media culture, with an analysis of the British social class system. Bragg appeared on the Front Row "Cultural Exchange" on May Day 2013. He nominated a self-portrait by Rembrandt as a piece of art which he had found especially interesting. In 2015, Bragg was appointed as a Vice President of the Royal Television Society.

=== Writing ===
Having produced unpublished short stories since the age of 19, Bragg had decided to become a writer after university. He recognised that writing would not, initially at least, earn him a living, and he took the opportunity at the BBC that arose after he had applied for posts in a variety of industries. While at the BBC, he continued writing. Publishing his first novel in 1965, he decided to leave the BBC to concentrate full-time on writing.

A novelist and writer of non-fiction, Bragg has also written a number of television and film screenplays. Some of his early television work was in collaboration with Ken Russell, for whom he wrote the biographical dramas The Debussy Film (1965) and Isadora Duncan, the Biggest Dancer in the World (1967), as well as Russell's film about Tchaikovsky, The Music Lovers (1970). Most of Bragg's novels are autobiographical fictions, set in and around the town of Wigton during his childhood. In 1972, he co-wrote the script for Norman Jewison's film Jesus Christ Superstar (1973). Although Bragg published several works, he was unable to make a living, forcing a return to television by the mid-1970s.

Bragg received a variety of reviews for his work, some critics declaring it outstanding and others suggesting it was lazy. Many suggested that splitting his time between writing and broadcasting was detrimental to the quality, and that his media profile and his known sensitivity to criticism made him an easy target for unjust reviews. The Literary Review's prize mocking his writing of sex in fiction, according to The Independent, was awarded not on readers' nominations, but simply because it would be good PR. From 1996 to 1998 he also wrote a column in The Times newspaper; he has also occasionally written for The Sunday Times, The Guardian and The Observer.

=== Peerage ===
Bragg's friends include the former Labour Party leaders Tony Blair and Neil Kinnock, and former deputy leader Roy Hattersley. He was one of 100 donors who gave the Labour Party a sum in excess of £5,000 in 1997, the year the party came to power under Blair in the general election. The following year he was appointed by Blair to the House of Lords as the life peer Baron Bragg, of Wigton in the County of Cumbria, one of a number of Labour donors given peerages. This led to accusations of cronyism from the defeated Conservative Party.

In the Lords he takes a keen interest in the arts and education. According to The Guardian in 2004, he voted 104 times out of a possible 226 in the 2002-03 session, only once against the government, on the Hunting Act. He campaigned against it on the grounds that it could affect the livelihoods of Cumbrian farmers. In August 2014, Bragg was one of 200 public figures who signed a letter to The Guardian opposing Scottish independence in the run-up to September's referendum on that issue.

Bragg has occasionally commented on American politics, in 1998 agreeing with the sentiment that writer and polemicist Gore Vidal was "the greatest president America never had".

=== Advocacy ===
Bragg has defended Christianity, particularly the King James Bible, although he does not claim to be a believer, seeing himself in Albert Einstein's term as a "believing unbeliever", adding that he is "unable to cross the River of Jordan which would lead me to the crucial belief in a godly eternity." In 2012, Bragg criticised what he claimed to be the "Animus and the ignorance" of the atheism debate.

In August 2016, Bragg publicly accused the National Trust of "bullying" in its "disgraceful purchase" of land in the Lake District, which could threaten the Herdwick rare breed of sheep, as well as the Lake District's historic farming system, for which the region was nominated as a UNESCO World Heritage Site.

== Personal life ==
In 1961, after a short courtship, Bragg married his first wife, Marie-Elisabeth Roche (b. 1939). In 1965 they had a daughter, Marie-Elsa Bragg. Roche was a French viscountess studying painting at Oxford. In 1971, Roche died by suicide. In an interview with The Guardian in 1998, Bragg said, "I could have done things which helped and I did things which harmed. So yes, I feel guilt, I feel remorse." This was in part a reference to his infidelities which included Cate Haste, whom he married in 1973. Haste was also a television producer and writer, whose literary work includes editing the 2007 memoir of Clarissa Eden, widow of Anthony Eden, and collaborating with Cherie Booth, wife of Tony Blair, on a 2004 book about the wives of British prime ministers. They had a son and a daughter.

In June 2016 it was reported that Bragg and Haste had separated amicably, and that Bragg now shared a home with former film assistant Gabriel Clare-Hunt, with whom he had an affair that began in 1995. She is 16 years younger than he. The marriage between Haste and Bragg was dissolved in 2018 and Haste died from lung cancer in April 2021. Another reported affair was with Lady Jane Wellesley between 1979 and 1987.

In September 2019 he married Clare-Hunt at St Bega's Church in Bassenthwaite, part of the Lake District National Park. His eldest daughter, Marie-Elsa, a priest, conducted the service. His second daughter, Alice, read a lesson, while his son, Tom, was an usher. Guests included Cumbrian mountaineer Sir Chris Bonington and the ceremony featured the premiere of music specially written by Bragg's friend, composer Howard Goodall.

Bragg has publicly discussed two nervous breakdowns that he has suffered, one in his teens and another in his 30s. His first breakdown began at the age of 13. Inspired by a passage in Wordsworth's The Prelude, he found ways to cope, including exploring the outdoors and the adoption of a strong work ethic, as well as meeting his first girlfriend. The second followed his first wife's suicide. He traces the origin of a lifelong nervousness of public speaking to the experience of giving a reading from the lectern as a choirboy at the age of six.

At the age of 75, he was profiled in the BBC Two television programme Melvyn Bragg: Wigton to Westminster, first broadcast on 18 July 2015. He lives in Hampstead Hill Gardens in Hampstead, London, but still owns a house near his home town of Wigton. He is a member of the Garrick and Chelsea Arts clubs.

He also takes an interest in football, supporting both Carlisle United and Arsenal. He is the vice president of the Carlisle United Supporters Club London Branch.

Bragg is a relative of Sir William Henry Bragg and his son, Sir Lawrence Bragg, who were awarded the Nobel Prize in Physics in 1915 for their work in X-ray crystal structure analysis. He presented a Radio 4 programme on the subject in August 2013.

== Positions and memberships ==
- President of the Words by the Water literary festival
- President of the National Campaign for the Arts (since 1986)
- Domus Fellow, St Catherine's College, Oxford (1990)
- Chairman of Border Television 1990–96 (deputy chairman 1985–90)
- Honorary Fellow, Wadham College, Oxford (1995)
- Governor of the London School of Economics (since 1997)
- Peerage – Baron Bragg (since 1998)
- Chancellor of the University of Leeds (1999–2017)
- President of the charity MIND (2002)
- Honorary Fellowship of the British Academy (2010), for "public understanding of the arts, literature and sciences"
- Honorary Fellowship of Royal Society (2010)
- Honorary Fellowship from the University of Cumbria 2010
- Honorary Doctorate of Literature (D.Litt.), University College London (2014)
- President of the National Academy of Writing
- Vice President of the Friends of the British Library
- Chairman of the Arts Council Literature Panel
- Vice President of the Carlisle United Supporters Club London Branch
- Member of the Order of the Companions of Honour (CH) (2018)
- Honorary degree from the University of Oxford (2025).

== Awards and honours ==
Literary prizes

- Writers' Guild Screenplay Award (1966)
- Mail on Sunday/John Llewellyn Rhys Prize for Without a City Wall (1968)
- Time/Life Silver Pen Award for The Hired Man (1970)
- Northern Arts Association Prose Award (1970)
- Bad Sex in Fiction Award for A Time to Dance (1993)
- WH Smith Literary Award for The Soldier's Return (2000)
- Crossing The Lines was long-listed for the Booker Prize in 2003

Film & television awards

- Broadcasting Guild Award (1984)
- British Academy of Film and Television Arts Dimbleby Award (1986)
- BAFTA TV Award for An Interview with Dennis Potter (1995)
- BAFTA Academy Fellowship Award (2010)
- Best New Radio Series for Routes of English (2000)
- Royal Television Society Lifetime Achievement Award (2015)
- Sky Arts Awards Lifetime Achievement Award (2024)

Other awards

- Ivor Novello Musical Award (1985)
- Honorary Degree from the Open University as Doctor of the University. (1989)
- Namesake of Millom School Drama Studio (2005)
- The South Bank Show Lifetime Achievement Award (2010)
- Sandford St.Martin Trust Personal Award (2014)

== Bibliography ==
=== Novels ===
- For Want of a Nail (1965)
- The Second Inheritance (1966)
- Without a City Wall (1968)
- The Cumbrian Trilogy:
  - The Hired Man (1969)
  - A Place in England (1970)
  - Kingdom Come (1980)
- The Nerve (1971)
- Josh Lawton (1972)
- The Silken Net (1974)
- Autumn Manoeuvres (1978)
- Love and Glory (1983)
- The Maid of Buttermere (1987) (based on the life of Mary Robinson)
- A Time to Dance (1990)
- Crystal Rooms (1992)
- Credo (1996) also known as The Sword and the Miracle
- The Soldier's Return Quartet:
  - The Soldier's Return (1999)
  - A Son of War (2001)
  - Crossing the Lines (2003)
  - Remember Me... (2008)
- Grace and Mary (2013)
- Now is the Time (2015)
- Love Without End: A Story of Heloise and Abelard (2019)

=== Non-fiction books ===
- Speak For England (1976)
- Land of The Lakes (1983)
- Laurence Olivier (1984)
- Cumbria in Verse (editor) (1984)
- Rich: The Life of Richard Burton (1988)
- The Seventh Seal (Det Sjunde Inseglet) (1993)
- King Lear in New York (1994)
- On Giants' Shoulders (1998)
- Two Thousand Years Part 1: The Birth of Christ to the Crusades (1999)
- Two Thousand Years Part 2 (1999)
- The Routes of English (2001)
- The Adventure of English (2003)
- 12 Books That Changed the World (2006)
- In Our Time: A Companion to the Radio 4 series (editor) (2009)
- The Book of Books (2011)
- William Tyndale: A Very Brief History (2017)
- In Our Time: Celebrating Twenty Years of Essential Conversation (2018)
- Back In The Day. A Memoir (2022)
- Another World. The Oxford Years: A memoir (2026)

=== Children's books ===
- A Christmas Child (1977)
- My Favourite Stories of Lakeland (editor) (1981)

=== Screenwriting ===
- The Debussy Film (1965)
- Isadora (1968) (with Clive Exton and Margaret Drabble)
- Play Dirty (1968)
- The Music Lovers (1970) (directed by Ken Russell)
- Jesus Christ Superstar (1973) (co-written and directed by Norman Jewison)

Academic offices
Preceded by The Duchess of Kent	Chancellor of the University of Leeds; 1999–2017	Succeeded by Dame Jane Francis
Orders of precedence in the United Kingdom
Preceded by The Lord Ahmed	Gentlemen; Baron Bragg	Followed by The Lord Harris of Haringey
