= William Tillyer =

English painter

William Tillyer (born 25 September 1938) is a British artist working within painting, watercolour and the printmaking tradition. His approach is constantly evolving; redefining and reinterpreting classic subject matter, such as landscapes, still lifes and portraits, in methods that challenge historical traditions and vary between bodies of work. Since the 1950s, Tillyer has exhibited internationally, and his work can be found in the collections of major institutions including the Arts Council of Great Britain, the Brooklyn Art Museum, the Museum of Modern Art (MOMA), Tate Britain and the Victoria and Albert Museum. There are at least 15 works by Tillyer in the Tate collection, including High Force (1974).

== Early life and education ==
Born in Middlesbrough, Tillyer studied painting at the Middlesbrough College of Art from 1956 to 1959 before moving to London in the 1960s to study at the Slade School of Art, with painting as his main subject and printmaking as his subsidiary. There, he encountered William Coldstream and Anthony Gross, among others.

In 1959, Tillyer had two of his paintings – Painting and Sea, Clouds and Beach (both 1958) – accepted for the 'Young Contemporaries' exhibition, the tenth in a series of annual shows arranged to make public the best work done by students in England's art schools. The paintings were selected that year by Victor Pasmore, Terry Frost, Andrew Forge, Ceri Richards and William Turnbull.

Following his time at the Slade, Tillyer took up a French Government Scholarship to study gravure under Stanley William Hayter, at Atelier 17 in Paris. Here, Tillyer had what he describes as "the archetypal artist's studio" at rooftop level in the American Pavilion of the Cité Universitaire, where he lived and worked when not in Hayter's studio. There he found a dense population of students, and a properly equipped print workshop. The pressure, though, was such that he spent much of his time in his room, making prints without a press. In 1963 he returned to England, and lived first in Notting Hill, in something close to abject poverty, and then in Middlesbrough.

By the later 1960s Tillyer was experimenting with constructed works with a conceptual basis, working on ideas of the grid and of the implied performative nature of hardware such as hinges and handles, he made works including Fifteen Drawer Pulls, 1966.

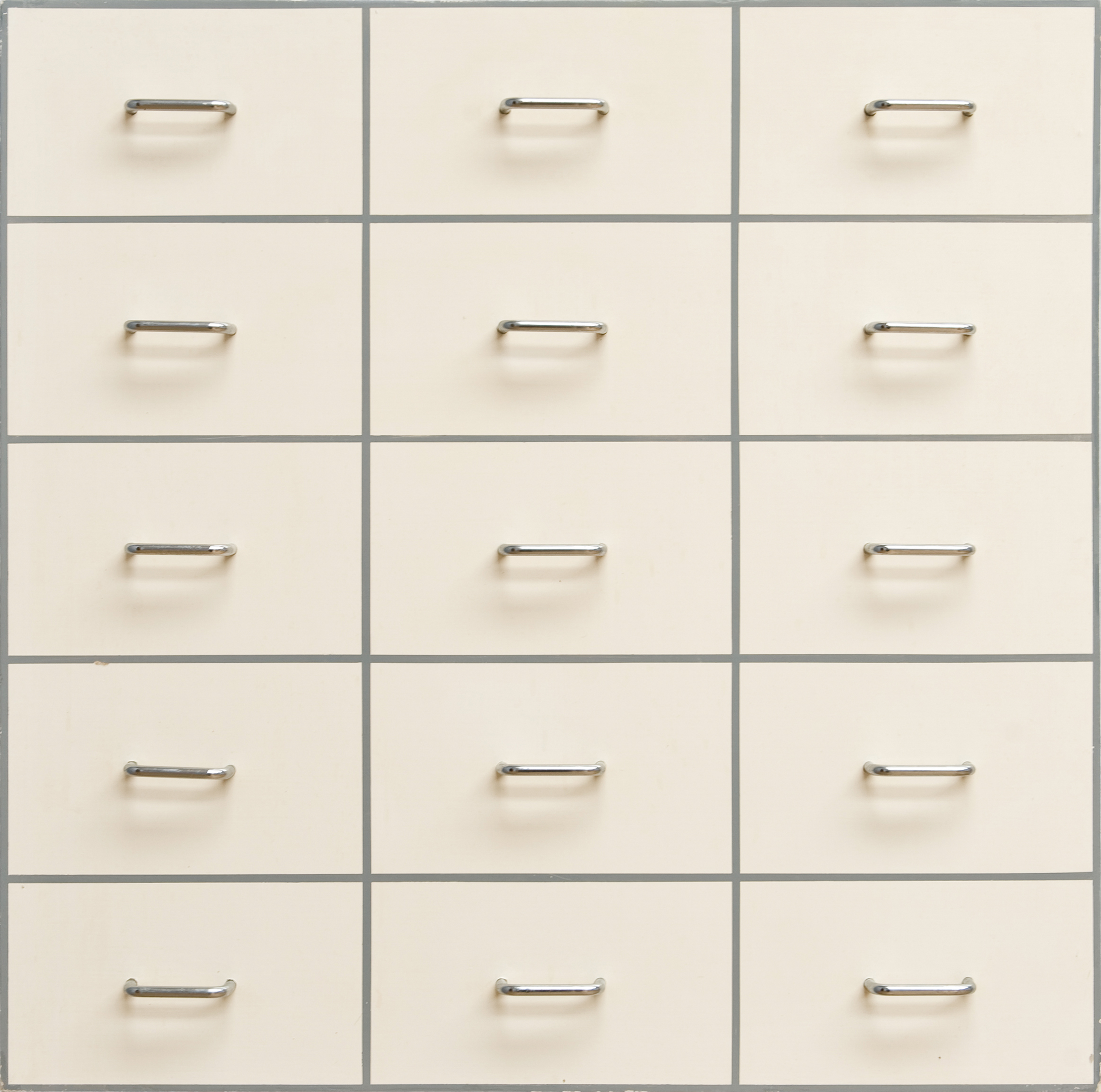
Fifteen Drawer Pulls, 1966

== Printmaking ==
Tillyer began experimenting with printmaking in 1958, while a student at the Slade, and it was as a printmaker that he made his first reputation. He won international acclaim at the Second International Print Biennale in Kraków in 1968, and, the following year, found the support of Bernard Jacobson, who has been his dealer ever since. They met after Tillyer paid a visit to Jacobson, one of the leading print dealers and publishers in the country, in his office on Mount Street, Mayfair armed with a selection of his newest prints. Jacobson was enthusiastic and selected two for immediate publication, Mrs Lumsden's and The Large Birdhouse.

The late 1960s saw a sudden explosion in the making and marketing of prints in Britain and generally in the Western world. International print exhibitions became regular events, some of them awarding major prizes. There was a new interest in prints as an art form, one that attracted a growing class of art-interested people not wealthy enough to collect unique paintings and sculpture. Finely edited and packaged suites and portfolios of prints, especially those produced by young and rising artists, were seen as attractive investments.

Tillyer's first major exhibition was held at Arnolfini Gallery in Bristol in 1970 and consisted of 33 etchings, three of which were immediately purchased by the British Council for its enterprising collection. With these prints, Tillyer used a variety of techniques, from etching to five tone screenprinting, to create lattices which through their gradation of tone depict what Pat Gilmour described as "a cool and unpeopled world...in which to reflect the surrounding flux of nature."

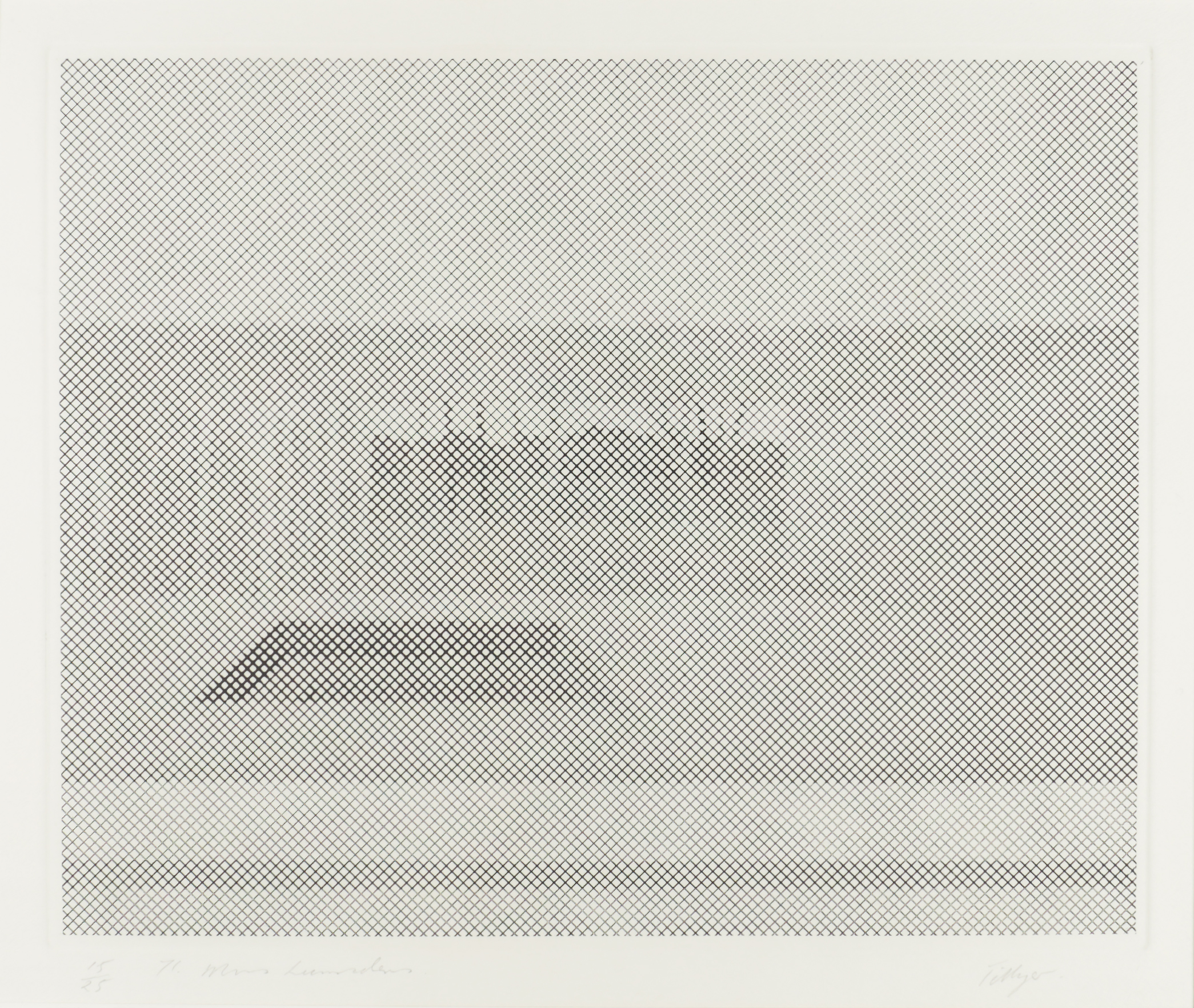
Mrs Lumsden's, 1971

Encouraged by Tillyer's showing at the Arnolfini Gallery, Jacobson published a further four etchings, the Dry Lake suite. In 1971, 26 of his etchings were shown in the new Print Gallery within the Arts Council's Serpentine Gallery in London. Henceforth, with Jacobson marketing them, Tillyer's prints were seen and appreciated more widely. Other artists responded to them with enthusiasm, notably David Hockney, Sam Francis, Roy Lichtenstein, Ed Ruscha and Andy Warhol. From 1972 onwards, Tillyer's work has been shown regularly in group and solo exhibitions around the world.

During 1975–76, while participating in an artist's a residency at Brown University, Providence, Rhode Island, Tillyer began to use an idiosyncratic tall format for prints produced by diverse processes. He claimed at the time that the format echoed the tall window of his campus studio, and was confirmed for him by Chinese scroll paintings he saw in the university's gallery. Jacobson had asked him to contribute an image to a portfolio of new prints to be published in 1976 in celebration of the bicentenary of John Constable's birth; the other artists contributing included David Hockney, Robyn Denny and Richard Smith. Tillyer used this unfamiliar, anti-landscape format for an etching done in honour of Constable, For John Constable: The Cape, New England; it enabled him to keep his distance from the artist he was paying respect to. He used a large proportion of aquatint, apparently brushed on like watercolour. Evening light catches on clouds that fill the vertical slice of sky; at the bottom can be seen the sails of the Hampstead windmill that appears in certain Constable pictures. Its presence determines the scale of the whole, and presents a contrast between that one man-made detail, at the foot of the tall print, and the soft, delicate, but somewhat threatening swathes of lilac that almost fill the rest.

The Providence Prints (1976) is a suite of seven woodcuts and linocuts, using the same format but wholly different in technique, expression and subject. Exceptionally, Tillyer here allowed himself a variety of genres within a suite: landscape (waterfall), still like (the cylindrical vase with flowers), the human figure (two images of a nude posed indoors against a screen and a mirror). To each of the seven prints the Tillyer lattice makes major contributions, including in the figure images, where three or four lattices, cut with differing strengths and at varying scales, present floor, screen, background and the figures themselves. These may be echoes of Matisse's early figures, more obviously in the instance of the reclining figure, redolent as it is of the Blue Nude of 1907. The other, a standing figure, reflected in a mirror, her elbows raised as her hands meet behind her head, is likewise reminiscent of leftmost figure in Matisse's Le Bonheur de Vivre of 1905–06, a stock pose adapted from nineteenth-century academic painting.

== Mesh works ==
The mid-1970s were a busy exhibiting period for Tillyer, but those years also show him reconstructing his professional image. Without playing down his prominence as a printmaker, he was eager to bring painting to the fore as his principal medium and vehicle of artistic expression. There followed a drastic reworking of the methods he had been using, and the images resulting from them, with Tillyer combining the canvas with a steel mesh ground, a bold decision without art historical precedent. In Blue Vase and Arrangement (1977–78), wire mesh occupies the centre and supplies the frame. The middle is occupied by the vase, which in turn is surrounded by colourful strokes and blotches: the nominal "arrangement" of flowers. These red, orange and green palimpsests burst forth from a dark, canvas ground, the jouissance of the flowers' colour being matched by the artist's self-consciously incongruous and witty identification of steel mesh with a ceramic vase.

There followed a second group of mesh paintings, which do away with the canvas altogether, made in 1979–80. Tillyer calls them the Mesh Works. Among the larger ones is Study for the House at Fontenay-aux-Roses by Way of the Admiral's House (1980), which was painted on an orthogonally positioned mesh of squares, collaged with bits of board front and back. There is thick paint on the mesh and thick paint on the boards, and these too come in primarily vertical and horizontal units. The white vertical form in the centre is not, this time, a vase, but a glimpse of a house amid foliage; to the left is a tall mottled green horizontal brushstroke, a poplar tree. The upper register, laden with bits of chipped wood panel assumes the form of a clear blue sky, and generally the scene is bathed in sunshine. A baroque gilt frame is hinted at on the right.

Tillyer would seem in this "study" to have tested how much and how little information would serve to convey his theme. He has expressed his interest in "the tension between the artificial and the real". Tillyer makes images—often, though not exclusively—with subjects derived from the natural world, which, through varying degrees of transformation, are turned into something essentially different: pictorially and materially. He tests, and ultimately expands, the limits of how far he is able to distance the artificial depiction from its real-world referent, without losing the reference itself, the point of this enterprise being to investigate and to demonstrate ever more fully the axiomatic contrivance and conceit implicit in the creation of all art.

== Watercolours ==
In 1987, the Bernard Jacobson Gallery showed a selection of Tillyer's 'English Landscape Watercolours'. The title-page of the catalogue states: "From April 1985 until March 1987, William Tillyer travelled throughout the British Isles and produces over 200 watercolours." Twenty-seven of these were exhibited and finely reproduced in the catalogue. Peter Fuller's thoughtful introduction raises a number of points. It outlines Tillyer's position vis-à-vis tradition and innovation: "Tillyer's paintings depend, for their aesthetic effects, upon his responses to the world of nature; and yet, at the same time, his pictures do not offer a reproduction of the appearances of that world. Indeed, they seem to be deeply involved with that kind of questioning of the nature of the medium itself, so typical of late modernist concerns; Tillyer's painting in oil shows a characteristically self-critical doubt about the validity of illusion and representation, and a restless preoccupation with the nature of the picture plane, the support and the framing edge. Tillyer often seeks out 'radical' solutions, assaulting the surface, tearing, reconstituting, collaging." Fuller goes on to outline the history of English watercolour painting, associating Tillyer's use of the medium especially with the examples of Alexander Cozens and Thomas Girtin. He also stresses how J. M. W. Turner and others enlarged the effects achieved in it by "roughing and scraping the surface of the paper" and other such means, while Ruskin recommended the admixture of white to make watercolour opaque. Girtin, before Ruskin weighed in, had "sought to 'purify' the practice of watercolour" and made positive use of the whiteness of his chosen paper, together with delicate and also denser washes of colour. Fuller found this technique in Tillyer. He concludes: "that in watercolours, and perhaps only in watercolours, the great cry of the Romantic aesthetic (i.e. 'Truth to Nature') and that of emergent Modernism (i.e. 'Truth to Materials') were, in effect, one and the same. For, when used in a way which preserved the particular qualities of the medium (even at the price of loss of immediate resemblance to the appearance of things) watercolour painting seemed to come closest to embodying the fragility, and elusive spontaneity, of our perceptions of nature itself." This, he adds, is what "Tillyer seems to have understood so fully." Thus Tillyer appeared to be extending the researches of Ivon Hitchens and of Patrick Heron, Peter Lanyon and others associated with St Ives, fusing their response to nature, inherited from Romanticism, with the modern call for independent, often abstract image-making, guided by the doctrine of 'Truth to Materials'. In this, Fuller argues, we should recognise "a quest for spiritual values"; indeed this is a function of the continuing vitality of English landscape painting. Here Fuller makes good use of a quotation from Ruskin: "The English tradition of landscape, culminating in Turner, is nothing other than a healthy effort to fill the void which the destruction of Gothic architecture has left." To this tradition belong, according to Fuller, "Tillyer's best watercolours" even as they declare their modernity: his response to nature is linked to "the search for 'spiritual values'." Thus Tillyer is saved from what Fuller sees as late modern art's "greatest weakness": ending in "aesthetic failure" in pursuit of "an abstract 'art of the real'." Tillyer's watercolours are beautiful in themselves. His gentle washes of colour tell us that our finest aesthetic feelings are intimately related to out experience of nature. Not to be aware of that which leads us "to injustice and to exploit the natural world (and, indeed, each other)." Tillyer's watercolours invite us to share with him a tentative and tremulous sensation of physical and spiritual oneness with the natural world.

== The Westwood Paintings ==
In 1987 Tillyer bought some farm buildings in an isolated spot in North Yorkshire and put much effort into developing them as a home and workplace. It was here that he painted the Westwood series, a group of large-scale acrylic and oil paintings on canvas. There is an epic gravity about the works. The artist painted them using a broom head to deposit large arcs and commas of paint, keen to explore and exploit "the physicality of the medium." These paintings overwhelm the viewer with their sheer visual presence, their muscular use of paint and the power of their formal and colour contrasts. Yet at the same time, according to Lynton, Tillyer seems to be stating something which "comes perilously close to the thoughts of that famous piece of versifying: 'Poems are made by fools like me / But only god can make a tree.' Or: beware, this is only art; admire it, but know what you are admiring; do not use my paintings as a pretext for adoring nature." The implication here seems to be that while Tillyer could, had he wished, have created paintings which cajoled the viewer to bask in the pleasures that convincing landscape images provide, he elected not to, instead utilising a marked economy of means to suggest form, using, for example, only a single brushstroke to articulate a cloud, or the canopy of a tree, as in Untitled (1989). The Westwood paintings, sparse, yet Herculean in their vigour, insist on being blatantly synthetic; they declare their own artifice emphatically. Colours seem to lie on the very threshold of the picture plane, recession is implied very rarely, and patches of unpainted canvas abound. These are not landscapes, they cannot even accurately be termed depictions of them. This is Tillyer's version of the Verfremdungseffekt, Brecht's way of "making strange" lest his audiences should settle down into passive receptivity.

Many forms and gesture recur. However, what Tillyer calls "gestures", a word redolent of the ostensibly intuitive actions of abstract expressionist painting, are in fact wholly deliberate. They need to be: their placing is exact and they can be huge. Their colour identifies their real-world referent, for example: (blue) sky, (white) cloud, (green) tree, (red) plant, (brown) earth and so on. Wide brushes are used to pick up more than one colour or tone. Thus in the same form might be found green, mingled with yellow or brown. In Green Landscape with Tree and Cloud (1989), a broad blue arc is partly covered by a black curve, and this in turn is overlaid with a shorter stroke in brilliant white, the topmost lateral edge of which is yellow, indicating a Tillyer cloud. In many places colours nestle within other colours, to suggest form, in this way.

== Living in Arcadia ==
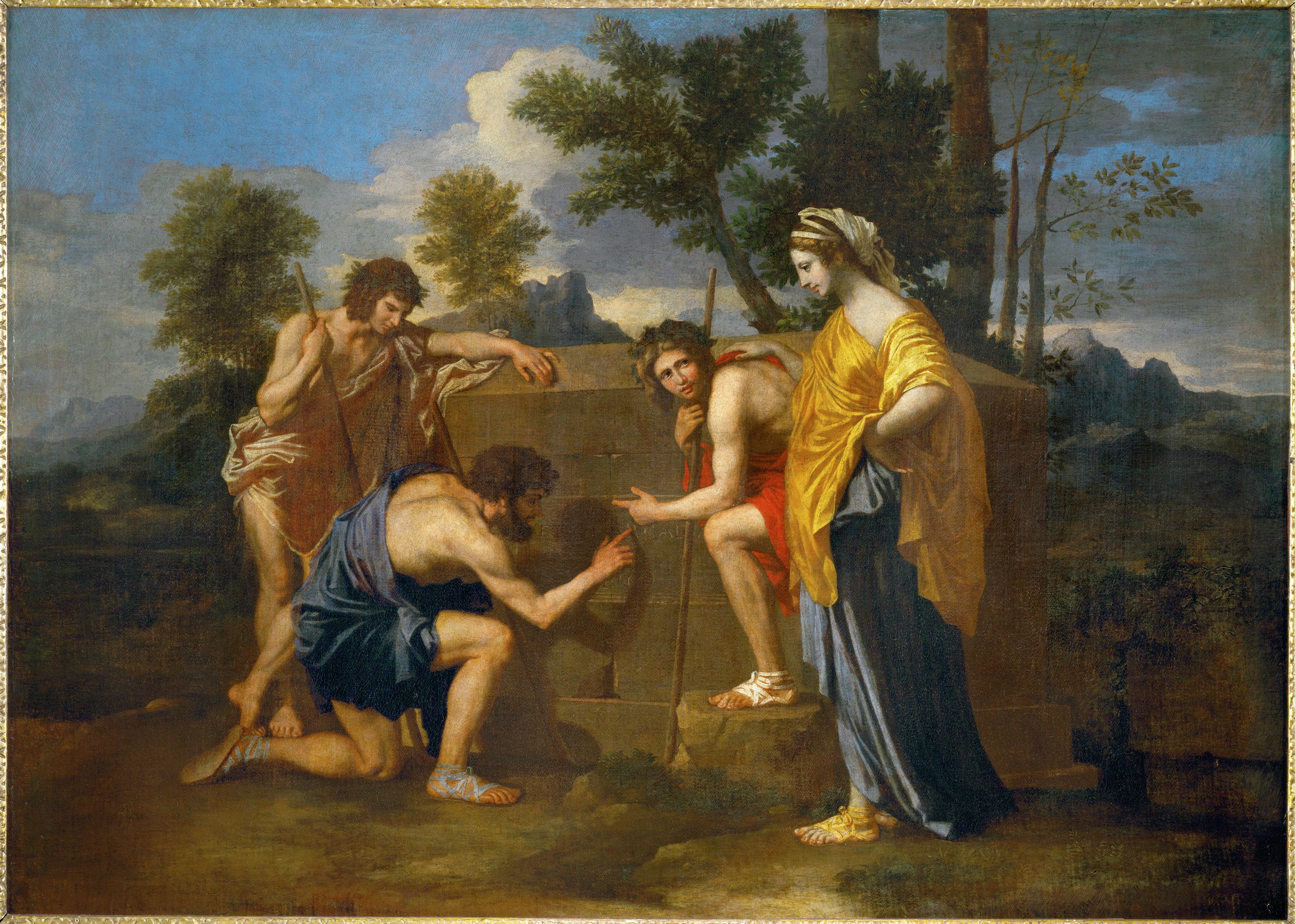
Nicolas Poussin, Et in Arcadia ego (deuxième version), 1637–38

The Living in Arcadia paintings were made in Yorkshire in 1990–91. In them, writes David Cohen, Tillyer "juxtaposes the organic and the geometric, the gestural and the rational, the empirical (felt, observed) and the ideal (thought, imposed)." These dualities are certainly there, and patent once we look for them. But the way he explores them makes it dangerous to attribute standard qualities to them: nothing is ever quite what it seems. Certainly they are "organic" and "geometric": these adjectives are clear enough. "Gestural", however, implies that the forms are not planned and thought-out, which axiomatically they are. Tillyer deploys pictorial rhetoric masterfully, using forms that look spontaneous and emotive with the same deliberation as geometric forms. Tillyer observes nature, but he also observes mankind's work. The world of design is as much within his remit as the world of nature, and "design" here includes aspects of modern and old-master art that could well be labelled "ideal". His process is constructive as well as deconstructive. In paintings such as Square Form (1990), we see him assembling forms and marks in a considered way. The work's form betrays the artist's process, which involves clear thought before and during its creation. The canvas is square and white. In its lower left corner is a black square, its sides uneven, a blue parallelogram apparently rising from either behind or above it, the bottom edge of which seems to fade away. All the other forms are gestural, and yet their clear, crisp outlines would appear to belie the artist's ostensibly spontaneous mark-making. Organic yet geometric; gestural yet rational.

Tillyer's presentation of elements which speak of nature together with elements that speak of human manufacture and human logic has been in his art from the first: two sorts of reality, linked because nature too adheres to logical processes and by the fact that we live in an environment made up of both. His habit of interrupting our reception of his images was born out of his desire to stop us mistaking art's artificial procedures and results as reality—that is to say, as a persuasive representation of something real. Here we get to the point of the series. The title, Living in Arcadia refers to two pictures by the classical French Baroque painter Nicolas Poussin. Their original titles are uncertain now. They are often labeled Et in Arcadia ego (1627/1637–38), in itself an ambiguous phrase, that is perhaps best translated: "I too lived in Arcadia". In both versions, shepherds examine a sarcophagus. The implication is that they have just discovered the stone monument and, having read its portentous epitaph, are pictured in the process of comprehending its significance. Even in Arcadia, that idyllic pastoral land associated with perfect well-being, death rules. Poussin's humans and the sarcophagus make for an unambiguous contrast: they and their natural environment live, while it speaks of death. Tillyer's series engages broadly with the same idea. His coloured forms may refer to nature, but he shows us quite clearly that they are merely acrylic (and therefore artificial) pigments, applied to panel – not natural and not alive – while the nominal "square form" is perhaps his equivalent to Poussin's man-made tomb.

== Fearful Symmetries ==
When Tillyer's Fearful Symmetries series was shown at the Bernard Jacobson Gallery in 1993, the catalogue reprinted an article Martin Gaylord had written a few weeks earlier. Gayford visited Tillyer in Yorkshire, and discussed with him his ideas about nature and landscape and his thoughts concerning watercolour painting, his own and his most important predecessors', Alexander and John Robert Cozens, J. M. W. Turner, John Sell Cotman etc. The first months of 1993 saw a large exhibition of 'The Great Age of British Watercolours' at the Royal Academy, and it made good sense to get Tillyer's response to this on the way to focusing on his own use of the medium. Tillyer declared his interest in the founders of this 'great age', and distanced himself from the elaborately worked watercolours of the mid-Victorians, done, as he said, to compete with oil paintings but essentially unable to. "Each medium has its own nature. It's what you're saying with the medium that's important." He emphasised the originality, the modernity, of the past painters he admired, and also his personal aversion to making topographical portraits of selected landscapes. But he also stressed the affinity of watercolours to the British landscape, and vice versa: "Around here moisture appears actually to rise out of the ground, out of the earth. It almost feels as if the sky is being formed from the earth – a rising of moisture into the void of the sky. Watercolour is almost the very nature of landscape in itself, its own properties. Landscape is simply weather – air and water... To my mind, the pure use of watercolour involved starting from white paper, and then gradually working back – so that any light and air you want in the piece is the first mark you make." About the new series of paintings Gayford said very little. It was primarily Tillyer's watercolours he had gone to discuss, in the context both of 'the great age' and of Tillyer's thoughts about nature and about the Romantic/classical duality signalled so firmly in the Westwood and Living in Arcadia paintings. The new paintings were being prepared for their trip to London. Gayford mentioned the contrast each of them offered, the "rather jarring opposition" between the natural forms, usually on the right, and the geometrical forms, usually on the left, now made as cuts into the canvas-on-board front plane. He rightly emphasised both that contrast, which seemed to him like "a contest, even a battle", and the resolution of the two elements on the conceptual level, since nature's forms too are structured mathematically. He also explained Tillyer's use of the series title, Fearful Symmetries. The words echo William Blake's, in his poem The Tyger, but Tillyer says he took them from the title of a piece of music by the American composer John Adams. In many respects the new series continues methods and images initiated in the Living in Arcadia series. However, the new series, produced in 1992–93 is more concentrated, in that all the paintings have the same format and dimensions (36 x 42 inches), and are all set into the characteristic Tillyer timber frame, painted in various blue-greys. Ayton (1993), for example, is painted on uninterrupted canvas, sans wire mesh and sans planar recession, in thinned acrylic over white and could almost be a watercolour, a suitably delicate response to light and air.

== The Kachina paintings ==
In the autumn of 1994 Tillyer showed his next series, the Kachina paintings, at André Emmerich's gallery in New York. The catalogue appends a Tillyer text, 'some Brief Notes'; the introduction is by Martin Gayford. In it, Tillyer writes about the Italian Renaissance as, for all its positive achievements, a deleterious episode in the long history of art: "The Kachina paintings... may also be seen as a visual essay on the relation of illusion to reality... of the Renaissance ideal of spatial illusionism to the Byzantine concept of the object. The failure in the 15th century to couple the new Renaissance concepts of perspective and illusionistic space with those of Byzantium made for a lost opportunity. It is only in the 20th century that this failure has begun to be redressed." For the art historian this raises all sorts of difficulties, but the underling truth in what Tillyer outlines was known to the great innovators of Modern art, to Gauguin and Cézanne especially, as is shown by their efforts to abandon not only academic illusionism but also the illusionism of tone and colour still purveyed by Impressionism, in favour of a new flatness and formal, as opposed to naturalistic, rightness; also known to Matisse, Kandinsky, Malevich etc., who gave priority to the demands of the pictorial object and of their media. The Cubism of Picasso and Braque was, among other things, a dialectical treatment of the opposition to which Tillyer refers. And surely by at the very latest 1950, roughly the time when Matisse made his great paper cut-out compositions, and Pollock his finest drip works, the Albertian tradition of the tabula quadrata as a window on to reality had been set aside, countered by something equally powerful. Tilyer, however, takes this rejection further still. It is one thing for Pollock to substitute for perspective and tonal modelling the material reality of paint and colour and the brushstroke as visual fact. It is quite another to change the language of painting altogether, fracturing its traditional logic by introducing other, conventionally incongruous media, as in Tillyer's substitution of the canvas for a wire lattice in his earlier Mesh works.

The Kachina paintings likewise make reference to unconventional media: the kachina dolls made by the Native America Hopi tribe. The kachina doll, writes Tillyer in the catalogue, is "icon-like," and provided him "with a vehicle to explore the dialogue between nature seen romantically and the geometry of man-made forms" to which the series (and much of his earlier work) makes reference. Kachna dolls are at once figurative and geometrical; in them "gesture counters geometry." The forms of the paintings are themselves taken from the dolls, most obviously the blue ratchet-edged insectile biomorph that in Blue Ogre (1994) appears to devour the green and yellow comma-like gestures around which it curves. Though almost every painting in the series is vertical and many of them present dominant forms – "gestures" – of this sort, the artist has remarked: "They are all landscapes. All the paintings are kachinas, but most could just as well be given the title Landscape with Ruins." This refers to Tillyer's use of the type of landscape inherited from, primarily, Poussin. In the Westwood and Living in Arcadia paintings, we saw him knotting and fusing his pictorial signs for nature into quite concise clusters, operating as emblems more than as glimpses of landscape. Now he uses parts and aspects of the dolls in addition to Poussin's geometric and stereometric forms in his internal debate on the nature of art. This becomes more assertive than before, more up-front, less implicit. It is partly that the images themselves are so insistent. Big forms, on the surface as paint, run swiftly from top to bottom, sometimes organic and gestural, or else hard and geometric, flat and voluminous, relief and planar. They attempt to deal with the artist's strongly felt ideas about landscape and the nature of painting: of the eternal struggle between artifice and reality implicit in the creation, consumption and ontology of all art.

The verticality of most of the Kachina paintings, together with their compositions, which are usually firmly centred, gives them an almost figurative presence: something stands there, emerging from the tenebrous canvas ground beneath. But there are exceptions. Heart of the Sky: Orange Heaven (1994) is the only horizontal canvas in the series. It presents a dark Tillyer landscape, sliced open in the middle in the shape of a slightly asymmetrical diabolo (a sharply waisted cylinder). The back plane is black, so deep as to be almost luminous, and set against it we see most of what we take to be a bright red rectangle. The black and the red are so positive that they seem to shine out from this carved recess, overwhelming the landscape to which they play background.

== The 21st century ==
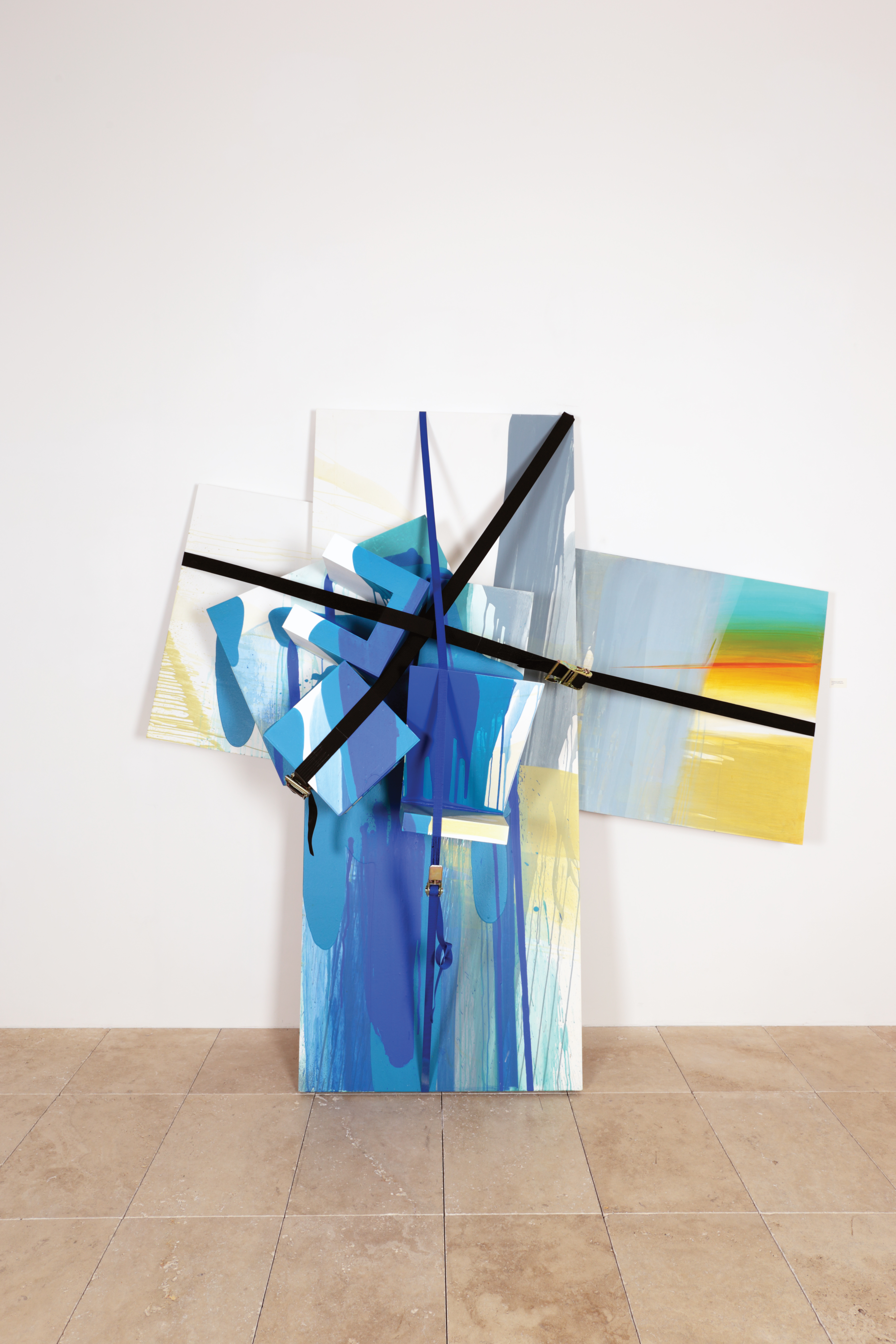
Packing to Avoid the Threat of Nothingness, 2004

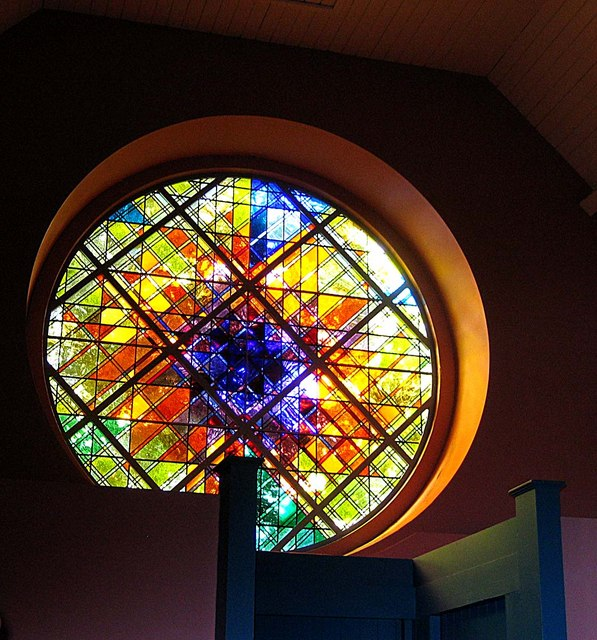
Stained-glass window, St Christopher's Church, Gunnerton, Northumberland

The 21st century saw Tillyer return to making constructed works and painting on mesh much as he did in the 1960s and 70s. In the early 2000s he began work on the Hardware Variations a series of works which included door handles and unusual materials such as glass and fabric. He followed this up with the Farrago constructs in 2004, large scale sculptural constructions of wood, paint and straps and ratchets.

In 2010 a major monograph on his watercolours was published by 21 Publishing covering almost 40 years of his practise. In the extensive text American art critic and poet John Yau writes: "However beautiful they are, and many of them are extremely beautiful, almost painfully so, Tillyer's watercolours never lead us away in favour of an Edenic vision."

In 2013 Middlesbrough Institute of Modern Art in Middlesbrough MIMA held the first major retrospective exhibition of Tillyer's work since 1996.

In late 2017, Bernard Jacobson announced in the Art Newspaper that he would be filling most of his 2018 exhibition schedule with shows dedicated to Tillyer, launching "five separate exhibitions incorporating new and historic works by the Middlesbrough-born artist." Jacobson, who has been Tillyer's dealer since 1969, stated: "He was an unknown then, and I’ve stayed loyal to him since. I consider him the heir to Constable through Cézanne and Matisse. He is an intensely private man who is completely outside the system, and I’m keen to set the record straight."

In 2018 Tillyer made his largest work to date, The Golden Striker, a free hanging 9 metre work of 5 panels of acrylic mesh in which the paint seems to be woven through the image, Tillyer describes these paintings as Tapestry paintings.

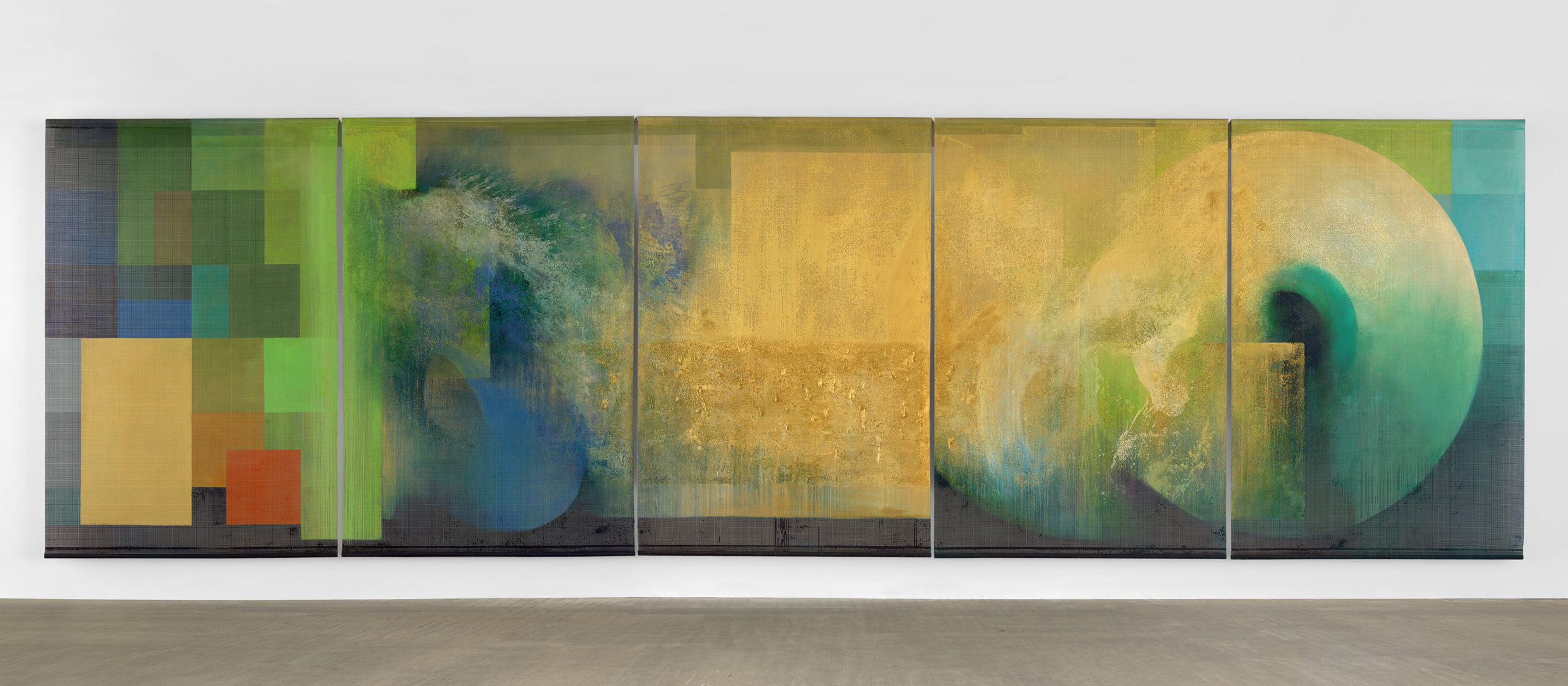
The Golden Striker, 2018

== Selected solo exhibitions ==
- 1971: Serpentine Gallery, London
- 1975: ICA Galleries, London
- 1978: Bernard Jacobson Gallery, London
- 1983: Bernard Jacobson Galleries, London, New York and Los Angeles
- 2008: "William Tillyer: The Cadiz Caprices", Bernard Jacobson Gallery, London
- 2014: "William Tillyer: Against Nature", mima, (Middlesbrough Institute of Modern Art), Middlesbrough
- 2015: "William Tillyer: The Palmer Paintings", Bernard Jacobson Gallery, London
- 2018: "William Tillyer: Radical Vision — Works 1956–2017", Bernard Jacobson Gallery, London
- 2018: "William Tillyer: À Rebours — A portfolio of 52 Prints", Bernard Jacobson Gallery, London
- 2018: "William Tillyer: A Painting Survey", Bernard Jacobson Gallery, London
- 2018: "William Tillyer and Alice Oswald: Nobody", Bernard Jacobson Gallery, London
- 2018: "William Tillyer: The Golden Striker — Esk Paintings", Bernard Jacobson Gallery, London

== Selected bibliography ==
- Gilmour, Pat (1974). William Tillyer: A Furnished Landscape. Bernard Jacobson Ltd.
- Lynton, Norbert (2001). William Tillyer: Against the Grain. 21 Publishing. ISBN 1-901785-05-X.
- Yau, John (2010). William Tillyer: Watercolours. 21 Publishing, London. ISBN 978-1-901785-13-5.
- Wiedel-Kaufmann, Ben (2010). William Tillyer: New Paintings: Clouds. Bernard Jacobson Gallery, London. ISBN 978-1-872784-42-7.
