= On Giants' Shoulders =

1998 book by Melvyn Bragg

- First edition
- Author: Melvyn Bragg
- Language: English
- Publisher: Hodder and Stoughton
- Publication date: 1998
- Publication place: United Kingdom
- Media type: Print
- Pages: 365 pp
- ISBN: 0-340-71260-0

On Giants' Shoulders was written in 1998 by Melvyn Bragg. The book was assembled after a series of interviews Bragg had with current scientists about the world's greatest scientists such as Archimedes, Isaac Newton and Einstein. Bragg, who brands himself as a "non-scientist", conducted these interviews on BBC Radio 4 for other non-scientists. The book looks at the notion of being a "genius" and through discussions with 20th-century scientists explores the extent to which the great scientists of history were geniuses.

The book's title is taken from Newton's 1675 quote: "If I have seen further it is by standing on the shoulders of giants."

== Inspiration ==
In the introduction to On Giants' Shoulders Bragg writes that the world of science was one of mystery and could not be entered nor understood by non-scientists such as himself. Thus he wrote this book, along with scientists, to open a door for other non-scientists to view the world of science as it has been for the past 2,500 years. By doing so, and by explaining the works of the greatest scientists in vernacular understandable by non-scientists, he aims to make the world of science less exclusive and mysterious.

== Scientists examined ==
- Archimedes (c. 287 BC–212 BC)
- Galileo Galilei (1564–1642)
- Sir Isaac Newton (1642–1727)
- Antoine Lavoisier (1743–1794)
- Michael Faraday (1791–1867)
- Charles Darwin (1809–1882)
- Jules Henri Poincaré (1854–1912)
- Sigmund Freud (1856–1912)
- Marie Curie (1867–1934)
- Albert Einstein (1879–1955)
- Francis Crick (1916–2004)
- James Watson (1928–2025)
