= Chris Dooks =

British musician (born 1971)

Christopher Dooks (born in 1971) is a Scotland-based artist, primarily working in the fields of photography, film and audio-art.

== Education and television work ==
Dooks was born in 1971 in Middlesbrough. He studied sound design and film at the Cleveland College of Art and Design from 1989 to 1991, and from 1991 to 1994 film and video art at the Edinburgh College of Art. In 1994 ITV screened his degree film The Sound of Taransay. Between 1994 and 1998 he directed several works for broadcast television, including The South Bank Show. In 1998 while working on a program for PBS in the United States Dooks became ill with Myalgic Encephalomyelitis which puts an end to his television career.

== Idioholism ==
After a break, Dooks was able to continue creating his audio-visual art. Researching ways how to work while suffering from Chronic Fatigue Syndrome he began developing creative strategies, he labeled Idioholism (a combination of holism and idiosyncrasy). His extensive research eventually lead to a PhD at the University of the West of Scotland. The central part of his work was a vinyl record trilogy.

== Audio work ==
Dooks has released several electronica and folktronica albums for record labels such as Bip-Hop, Highpoint Lowlife and Benbecula Records. He has co-operated with artists like Francis Cazal, Future Pilot, Hibernate, or Rutger Zuydervelt. Dooks also uses the moniker Bovine Life for audio works.

== Visual art ==
Dooks has produced work for the Millennium Experience and created installations and art works, among other for Market Gallery Glasgow, Teesside University, Middlesbrough venue, Gallery Edinburgh, Isis Arts Newcastle, Sandberg Institute Amsterdam, or the Edinburgh College of Art. In 2003 for Stills Gallery Edinburgh, Dooks coined the term Polymash to describe his "chaotic multi-disciplinary practice" and in 2007, Dooks founded "Polymash Digital Art Projects" which creates bespoke Psychogeography tours, most notably 2009's Surreal Steyning.

Dooks had screenings and talks at art spaces like Another Roadside Attraction Gallery, London, National Museum of Scotland, Furtherfield, London, or Image Movement, at festivals like International Documentary Film Festival Amsterdam, International Short Film Festival Oberhausen

== Personal life ==
He lives with his wife and two children in Edinburgh.
