= Great British Chefs =

British food website

Logo of Great British Chefs

Great British Chefs is British food media website featuring recipes, instructional guides, videos, food features and chef profiles. Founded in 2010 by entrepreneurs Vimal and Gill Khosla, Ollie Lloyd and Alastair Creamer, the site launched its first app in July 2011. The website is operated by Food Publishing Limited, which acquired the assets and intellectual property of the original Great British Chefs Limited in 2020. Great British Chefs has previously contributed a recipe series to The Guardian.

== Apps ==
The first Great British Chefs iOS app was released in July 2011 and featured 12 chefs, who each provided 5 recipes. The chefs included in the app were: Marcus Wareing, Nathan Outlaw, Tom Aikens, Martin Wishart, James Sommerin, Shaun Rankin, Frances Atkins, Nuno Mendes, Pascal Aussignac, Daniel Clifford, Agnar Sverisson, Simon Hulstone. The app was included in the Sunday Times' top 500 apps list, won a silver Lovie Award for Best Tablet App and was also featured in Apps Magazine's Top 100 Apps Ever.

The second Great British Chefs app, 'Feastive', was released in November 2011.

Great British Chefs' third app, 'Summertime', was produced in partnership with the online supermarket Ocado with a shopping list feature to purchase ingredients. The apps also have the ability to share recipes on social networking services. A portion of the revenue from the sale of the Summertime app went to the charity Action Against Hunger.

There was also an app for Windows 8.

== Reception ==
Reviews of the iOS apps were positive with The Telegraph praising the low price of compared to traditional cookbooks and the "superb photography [which] makes it equally lovely to look at". Technology website Pocket-Lint praised the navigation of the app and listed it as "app of the day" on July 27, 2011.

== Publications ==
Great British Chefs has published six cookbooks. Two have been shortlisted for the Guild of Food Writers Awards.

- Great British Chefs: 120 Recipes from Britain's Best Chefs (2018). 120 recipes from 60 chefs. ISBN 978-1999648503
- Great British Chefs: Vegetables (2020). 40 seasonal vegetarian and vegan recipes. ISBN 978-1913933005
- Great British Chefs: Hacks (2020). 48 technique-focused recipes and 25 full dishes. ISBN 978-1913933036
- Great British Chefs: Around The Table (2021). 70 recipes for sharing and entertaining. Shortlisted for the Guild of Food Writers Awards, 2022. ISBN 978-1913933081
- Great British Chefs: Kitchen Twists (2022). Modern twists on classic recipes. Shortlisted for the Guild of Food Writers Awards, 2023. Reviewed in The Caterer. ISBN 978-1913933104
- Great British Chefs: Open Kitchen (2023). 50 recipes from 30 chefs, with photography by Andrew Hayes-Watkins. Published by Clearview Books. Reviewed in The Caterer. ISBN 978-1908337726
