= Dave Pennington =

British powerlifter

David Pennington
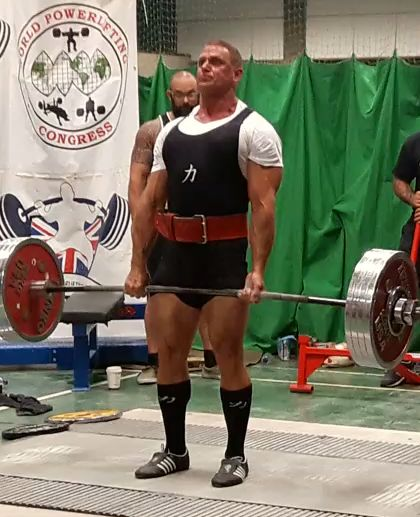
- Born: 1965 or 1966 (United Kingdom) Middlesbrough
- Occupation: Powerlifting

David Pennington (died 10 July 2018) was a British powerlifter.

Born in Middlesbrough, England, David was a 3 time gold medallist in the World Powerlifting Congress (WPC) Championships. He also achieved a gold medal at the WPC European Powerlifting Championships 2016 and a silver medal at the WPC European Championships 2017.

He won his first WPC Championship gold medal in Louisiana, USA in 2016 and two gold medals in Moscow in 2017 which he won in two successive days and in two different weight categories. In 2018 Dave set his second WPC World Record with a 190 kg bench press in the M3, 110 kg raw full power classic at the Alan Collins Cup. Dave's bench press in the raw full power classic in both the 100 kg and 110 kg M3 category has placed him number 1 in the overall British Rankings.

== Early life ==
Pennington was a competitive bodybuilder and won his first bodybuilding competition in 1992, winning the first timers in an English Federation of Body Builders (EFBB) (UKBFF) competition which qualified him for the British finals. He continued to compete and train at various gyms throughout the UK. He entered his first powerlifting competition at the age of 49.

Pennington died 10 July 2018 after sustaining an injury in competition.

== Medals ==
BPU British Championships

2016	Bristol, England	Raw Bench Press Only	M2	100 kg	1st Place
2017	Bristol, England	Full Power Classic	M3	100 kg	1st Place
2018	Bodypower, Birmingham	Raw Bench Press Only	Open	110 kg	2nd Place
2018	Bodypower, Birmingham	Raw Bench Press Only	M3	110 kg	1st Place
2018	Bodypower, Birmingham	Deadlift Only	M3	110 kg	1st Place

WPC European Championships - Representing Great Britain

2016	Stoke-on-Trent, England	Raw Bench Press Only	M2	100 kg	Gold
2017	Helsinki, Finland	Full Power Classic	M3	100 kg	Silver

WPC World Championships - Representing Great Britain

2016	Louisiana, USA	Raw Bench Press Only	M3	100 kg	Gold
2017	Moscow, Russia	Raw Bench Press Only	M3	100 kg	Gold
2017	Moscow, Russia	Full Power Classic	M3	110 kg	Gold

BPU British Records

2017	Bristol, England	Full Power Classic	M3	100 kg	Bench	British	185 kg
2017	Bristol, England	Raw Bench Only	M3	100 kg	Bench	British	185 kg
2017	Bristol, England	Full Power Classic	M3	100 kg	Total	British	627.5 kg
2018	Folkestone, England	Full Power Classic	M3	110 kg	Bench	British	190 kg

WPC World Records

2017	Helsinki, Finland	Full Power Classic	M3	100 kg	Bench	World	182.5 kg
2018	Folkestone, England	Full Power Classic	M3	110 kg	Bench	World	190 kg
