= Michael O'Hare (chef) =

British chef

- Born: June 1981 (age 45); Eston, North Yorkshire, England
- Spouse: Amanda Gilby
- Children: 1
- Culinary career
- Cooking style: Fusion
- Ratings
- Michelin Stars; AA Rosettes
- Current restaurant
- In Lamentation
- Previous restaurants
- The Man Behind The Curtain The Rabbit in the Moon Psycho Sandbar
- Website: The Man Behind The Curtain

Michael O'Hare (born June 1981) is a British chef from Middlesbrough, England. He was chef-patron at The Man Behind The Curtain in Leeds, which was awarded a Michelin star in October 2015. He also ran The Rabbit in the Moon at the National Football Museum in Manchester. He is now chef-patron of In Lamentation in Boston Spa.

O'Hare began cooking whilst at university before becoming a professional chef, gaining experience at various restaurants including John Burton-Race at The Landmark and Noma.

== Early life and career ==
O'Hare was born in Middlesbrough England. He describes Redcar, North Yorkshire, as his home town. From the age of 11 to 18 he studied classical and modern ballet. He briefly studied aerospace engineering at Kingston University, London, deciding to leave the course after a few months. In his early twenties, he worked in a call centre in Thornaby-on-Tees for energy company nPower.

It was during his time at university at the age of 19 that O'Hare began cooking: "I just liked going to the supermarket. I wasn't making sauces and all that. Just buying a bit of fish and grilling it."

Instead of attending catering college, he decided to begin his cooking career learning within professional kitchens, with his first job at Judges in Yarm. Other restaurants where he worked include Seaham Hall, working for John Burton-Race at The Landmark and Noma before becoming head chef at The Blind Swine in York.

In 2014, O'Hare opened his restaurant with the backing of Stephen Baylis, The Man Behind The Curtain, in Leeds, where he was chef-patron.

He has gained a reputation for creative and often unusual dishes. These include chocolate pudding with potato foam, raw prawn tails with cooked prawn brains and a dessert with baked potato custard. In 2015, O'Hare took part in BBC2's The Great British Menu where he made a dish entitled 'Emancipation' – a fish dish inspired by fish and chips served on a canvas.

In 2016, O'Hare became Creative Director of GG Hospitality, a company created by ex-professional footballers Ryan Giggs and Gary Neville. The company, along with O'Hare, opened a 'space-age Asian' restaurant called The Rabbit in the Moon at the National Football Museum in Manchester on 3 January 2017. O'Hare was also due to set up a fine dining restaurant – The Man Who Fell To Earth, and a less formal restaurant called Are Friends Electric within a new Manchester hotel at the Manchester Stock Exchange owned by GG Hospitality, but these did not open.

In October 2023, O'Hare closed The Man Behind the Curtain and then reopened it as Psycho Sandbar opened in early 2024. It then re-closed permanently in October 2024. The company operating the restaurant was liquidated to pay off the restaurant's £1 million debt owed to twelve creditors, including at least £519,000 owed to HM Revenue and Customs and £366,818 owed to Relentless, a managing firm run by Neville until his resignation as a co-director in September 2024.

In early 2026, O'Hare opened his next venture, IN LAMENTATION, an intimate 16-cover tasting menu restaurant in Boston Spa.

== Media ==
O'Hare competed in BBC2's The Great British Menu in 2015. In 2016, he appeared on BBC's Masterchef. He also made guest appearances on BBC's Saturday Kitchen and on Yes Chef in 2016 on BBC One. In 2016, 2017, 2018, 2019, 2020, 2023, 2024 and in 2025 he returned to The Great British Menu as a judge.

== Personal life ==
O'Hare has one child. O'Hare has become well known for his individual personal style. He became instantly recognisable with his 'rockstar hair' after his appearance on The Great British Menu and says “I know for a fact there could have been TV shows off the back of that haircut.” He is a qualified pilot, gaining his licence in Daytona a few years after leaving university.

== Television ==
- The Great British Menu – 2015, 2016, 2017, 2018, 2019, 2020, 2022, 2023, 2024 and 2025.
- Saturday Kitchen – 2015
- Masterchef – 2016
- Yes Chef – 2016
