= Living Architecture =

Holiday home rental company in the United Kingdom

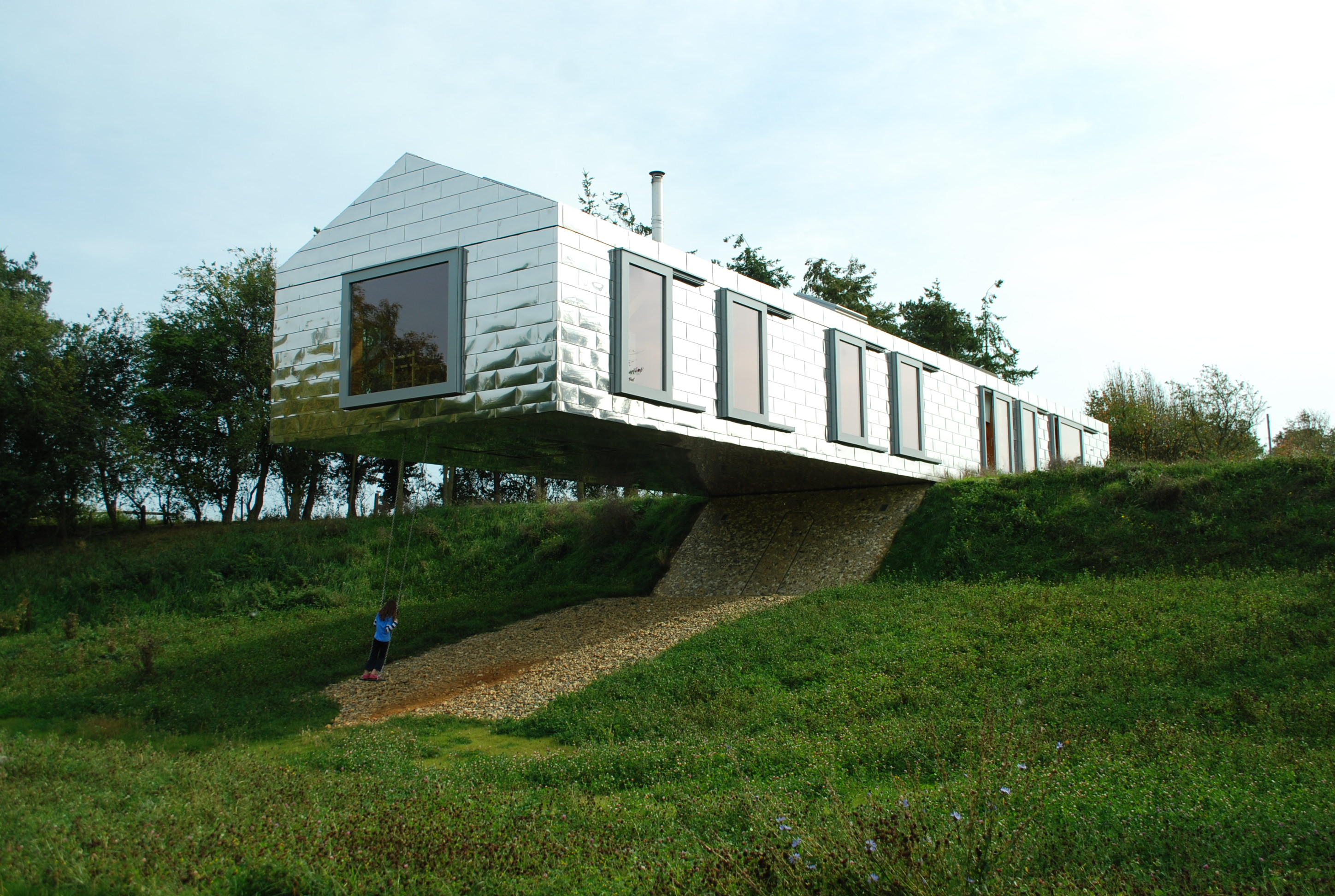
The Balancing Barn

Living Architecture is a not-for-profit holiday home rental company in the United Kingdom. It was founded by philosopher and writer Alain de Botton, who launched the scheme in 2010 in what its website claims is the first programme of its kind. The aim is to make exceptional buildings available for more people to experience by commissioning them from leading architects as holiday homes.

The houses include:

- The Balancing Barn, near Aldeburgh, Suffolk: opened October 2010. Architect: MVRDV with Mole as Executive Architect
- The Shingle House, Dungeness, Kent: opened Nov 2010. Architect: Nord architecture
- The Dune House, Thorpeness, Suffolk: opened Dec 2010. Architect: JVA with Mole as Executive Architect
- A Room for London, on the roof of the Queen Elizabeth Hall, South Bank, London: opened 2012. A collaboration with cultural organisation Artangel. Launched as part of the 2012 Cultural Olympiad. Architect: David Kohn and artist Fiona Banner.
- The Long House, Cockthorpe, Norfolk: opening Oct 2011. Architect: Hopkins Architects
- Secular Retreat, near Salcombe, Devon: Completed in 2019. Architect: Peter Zumthor with Mole as Executive Architect
- A House for Essex (or "Julie’s House"), Wrabness, Essex: opened in 2015. Created by the artist Grayson Perry, working with Fashion Architecture Taste (FAT)
- Life House, near Llanbister, Wales: Completed in 2016. Architect: John Pawson
