= Community in a Cube =

UK housing development

Coordinates: 54.578067°N 1.225664°W

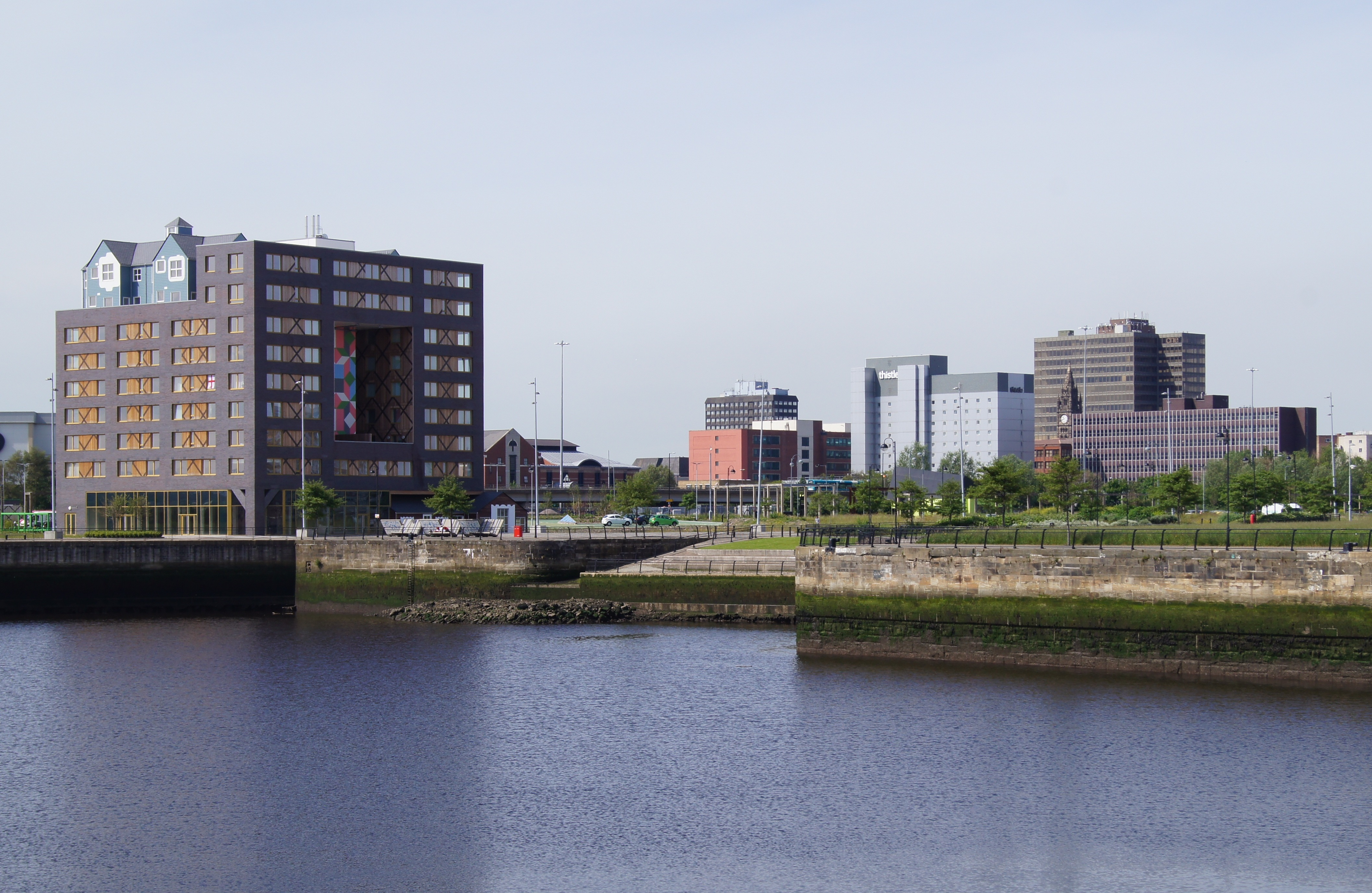
CIAC on the left

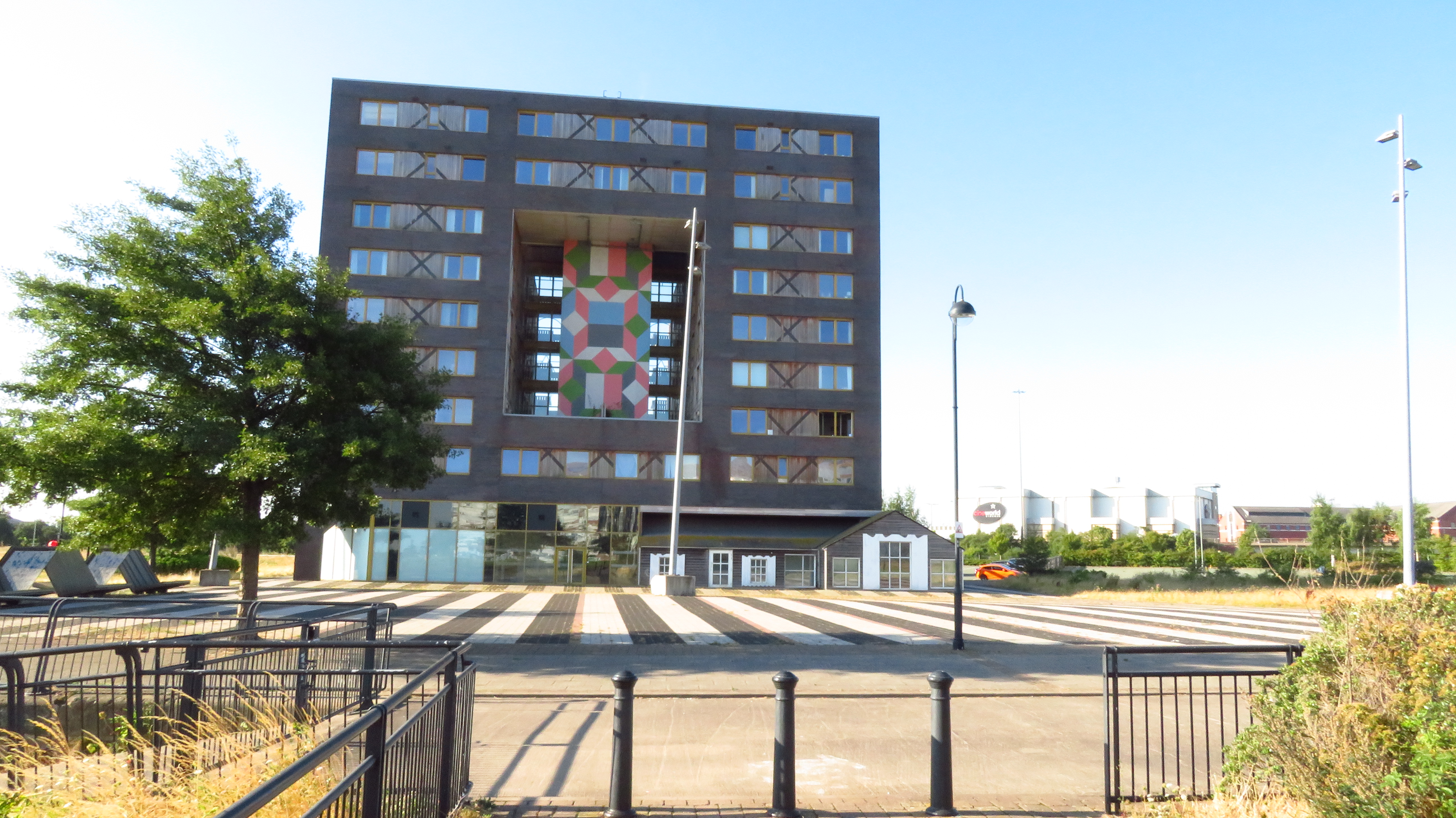
CIAC

Community In A Cube (CIAC) is a housing development on Windward Way, Middlehaven of Middlesbrough, United Kingdom designed by Fashion Architecture Taste for clients BioRegional and Quintain.
