= White Building, London =

The White Building
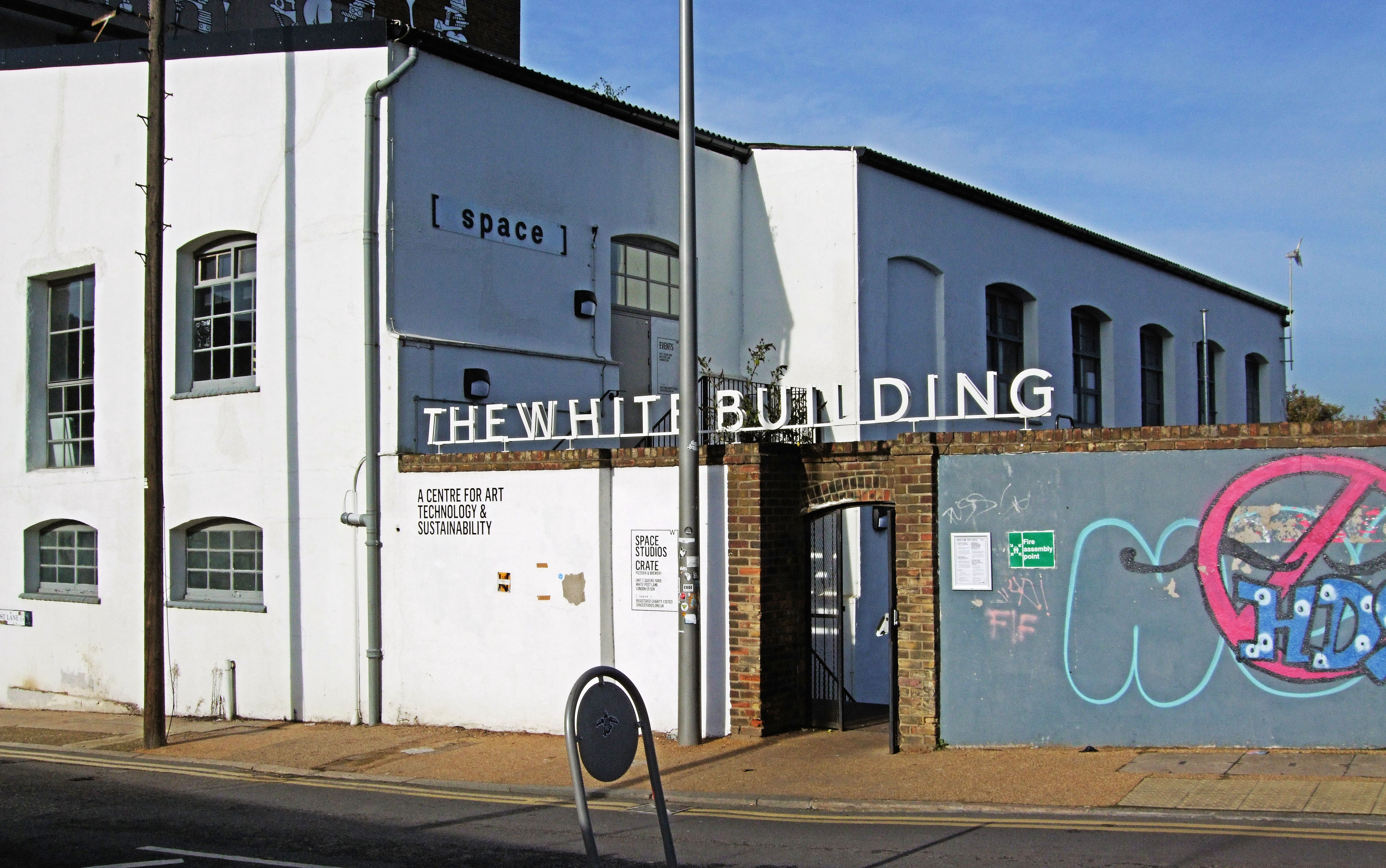
- The White Building

General information
- Coordinates: 51°32′34.3″N 0°1′19.33″W

Design and construction
- Architect(s): David Kohn
- Architecture firm: David Kohn Architects

The White Building was an arts centre in London, England.

== Architect ==
It was designed by David Kohn Architects, in collaboration with Exploration Architects. It was developed in partnership with the London Legacy Development Corporation, as a key part of the arts led strategy for the legacy of the Olympic Park and surrounding area and it was occupied by Space studios from 2012 until its closure in 2017.
