= A Room for London =

- Installation
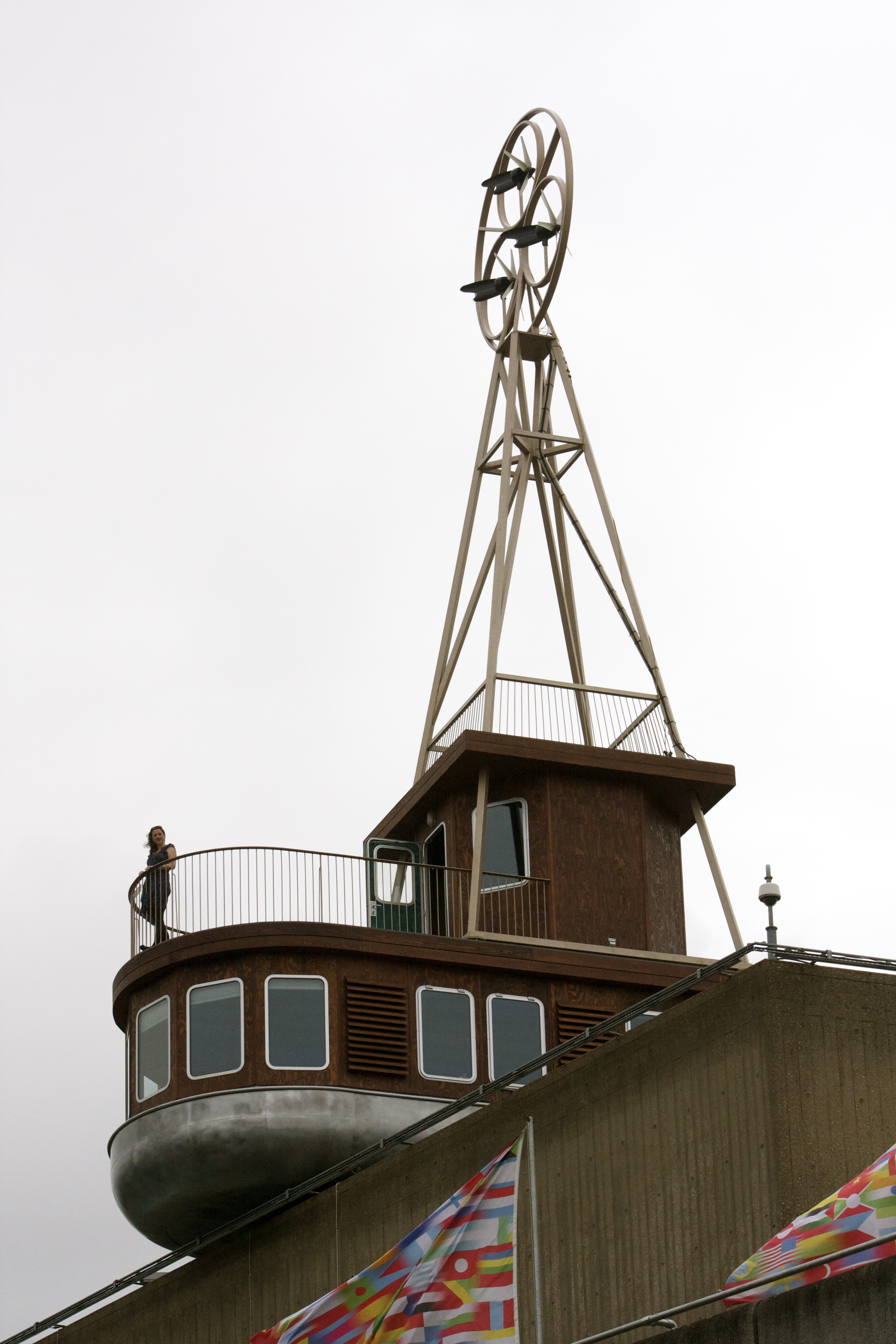
- A Room For London viewed from the South Bank in 2012
- Design: David Kohn
- Opened: 2012
- Owner: Living Architecture
- Location: Roof of the Queen Elizabeth Hall; London's South Bank
- Interactive map of A Room for London
- Coordinates: 51°30′24.58″N 0°6′58.64″W

A Room for London was a temporary structure located on the roof of the Queen Elizabeth Hall on London's South Bank. The structure, designed by architect David Kohn is described as "a one-bedroom installation" and is shaped to appear like a boat perched on top of a building.

The structure was put in place in 2012 and acted as a "single-room, boat-shaped hotel", available to be booked for single-night residencies. It was closed in mid 2016.

A Room for London is one of a number of projects by Living Architecture, a not-for-profit holiday home rental company founded by philosopher and writer Alain de Botton.

== Gallery ==
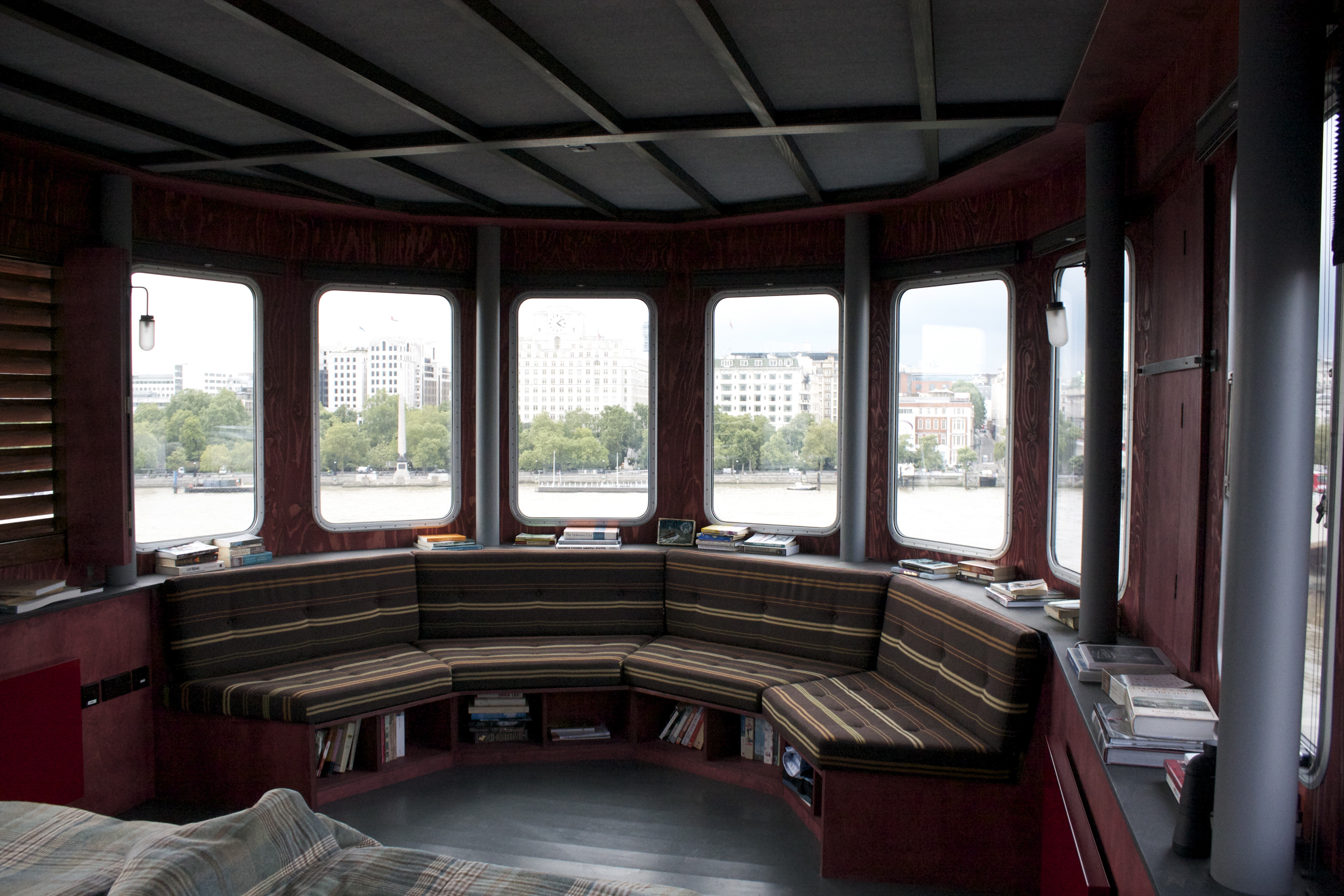
View of the inside

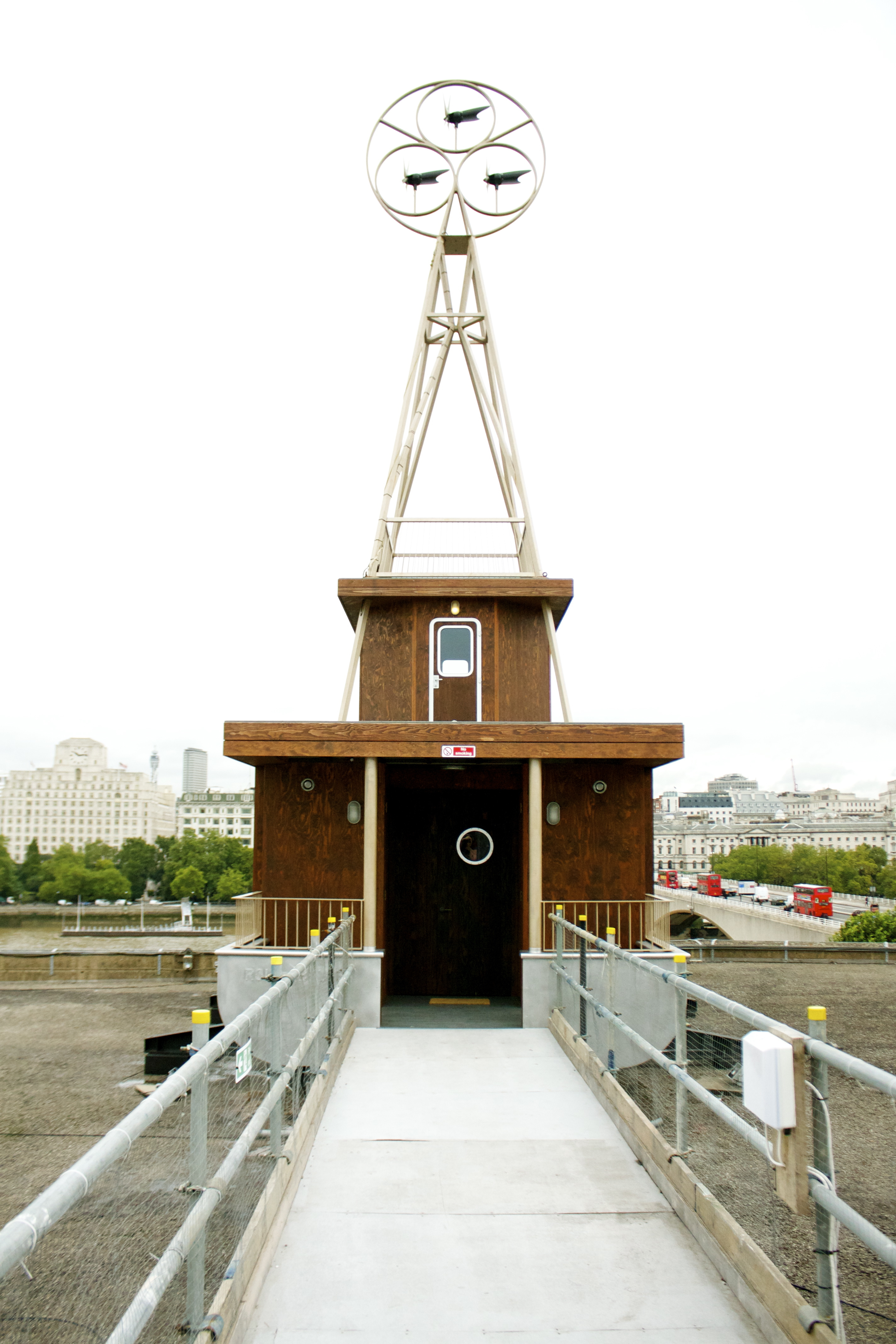
Rear view

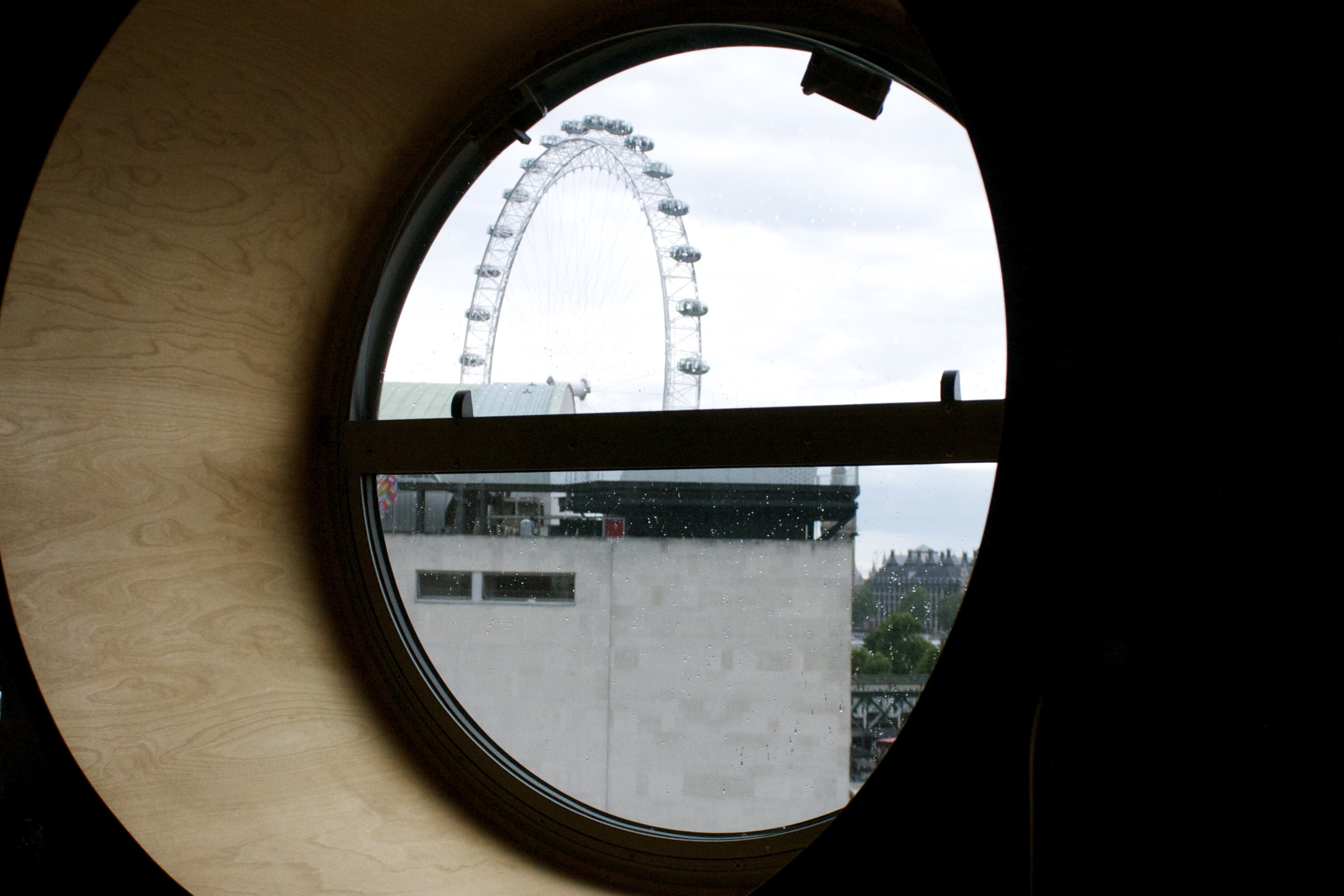
View out the porthole looking west
