= Fashion Architecture Taste =

Collaborative organisation in England

Fashion Architecture Taste or FAT is an art and architecture collaborative first established in the 1990s in London, England. Their work falls broadly under the postmodern category with pop-culture influences.

The group has been described as "very young" and "very controversial" and have a cult following. Over recent years they have developed a large body of critically acclaimed built work in the UK and abroad. In December 2013, the group announced a planned breakup.

== History ==
The group formed in London in the 1990s, and challenged the "orthodoxy of Modernist good taste", first with experimentalism in their Anti-Oedipal House (1993) that separated children and parents, and then at the 1995 Venice Biennale by distributing art from vending machines. They did a similar effort later in London's Carnaby Street on shopping bags (1999), and in 1998, converted an Amsterdam church into the Kessels Kramer Advertising Office in with big playground furniture, a fort, fake diving board, and lifeguard shack.

Sean Griffiths, Charles Holland and Sam Jacob are the main members of the group. Emma Somerset Davis has been a previous member and a director of the group and lead artist collaborating on FAT's art exhibitions and projects over ten years.

The group operated on a limited budget with their early projects and acted as an anti-hierarchical collective. They were influenced by Robert Venturi and Denise Scott Brown, Stanley Tigerman, Situationists, Mannerism, the Arts and Crafts movement, Archigram, and Jeff Koons. They "steal copy, collage and make overt references to all kinds of high and low architecture; reusing, rescaling, recolouring; remaking their sources in the wrong materials," with their first projects being redesigns of interiors such as the Brunel Rooms nightclub in Swindon (1995), where a running track, swimming pool, garden shed and lounge were added. One of Fat's directors, Sean Griffiths, built a house in baby blue with cutout wall shapes and artful references to Edwin Lutyens, Adolf Loos, and Robert Venturi.

The group has been described as "very young" and "very controversial", having "brought work in the ultra-cool Netherlands," success on the international lecture and exhibition circuit. Members of the group describe FAT's work as figurative, eclectic and "not constrained by notions of taste." They view mainstream architecture as abstract, and say their work is direct and traditional like the "Natural History Museum... It’s got little animals all over it." The group started out with a "small powerful, furiously debated body of built work, some of it up before the protagonists hit thirty".

== Recent work ==
FAT's design for a “bicycle surveillance shelter” or guard huts for bikes in Scheveningen is a small pyramid on one side and a battlemented castle on the other. FAT calls the work a "nonument" and it was popular enough to feature on a 69c Dutch stamp.

FAT also completed the Woodward Place building in the United Kingdom with a Dutch-gables-on-steroids treatment that "has the functionalists choking on their herb tea" in a rejection of tidiness and uniformity that embraces clients use of crazy self-built fireplaces, half-timbering and nick-nacks. FAT believes that "people should be encouraged to customise their homes," and won a competition to redesign the Brookes Estate tower block in London with a plan for "a matrix from which homes of various styles and sizes sprout, quite literally" and where tenants will choose from various design options.

FAT also did the £3.5 million makeover of the Saint Lucas Art Academy in Boxtel with "clever space planning behind a new facade of pseudo-gothic tracery in moulded concrete." FAT was brought in with a limited budget by the KesselsKramer advertising firm, whose church office it had designed 10 years prior, to help establish the technical art college for young students (16–20 years), in a more suitable and striking building. FAT wrapped the school in a precast pop-gothic wall. The "shock tactics" of the exterior "may be camouflage for a high architectural project going on underneath" and parts of the Saint Lucas Art Academy project have been described as "high cunning" and "disingenuous, unglamorous and undeniably sensible." Archined.nl, an authoritative Dutch website on architecture, said, "The Sint Lucas academy in Boxtel has been 'pimped' by English design outfit FAT."

Other works include a new Dutch town's community park that includes a village hall for hobbyists and a pet cemetery, and a "confidential new eco-village in the English countryside". FAT recognize a connection between architecture and fashion and their approach was described as "folk art for the information age ... It is an architecture that wants to be progressive, radical, and, most importantly, liked." The firm designed a New Islington social housing scheme in Manchester and refurbished a tower block in Newham using a "riot of colour and pattern" for the facades drawing on influences from the 1980s.

Fashion Architecture Taste designed 35 colorful homes to replace the Parson Cross Deerlands School, which closed in 2005, in Sheffield.

In 2011 FAT completed a 260-metre facade for the BBC's new TV production centre in the docks area of Cardiff, Wales. The distinctive profile of the facade was said to allude to the nearby docks warehouse and gothic architecture.

=== Breakup ===
In December 2013, FAT announced that they were going to split after 23 years. FAT planned to wrap up its business following the completion of A House for Essex, designed for Living Architecture (a collaboration with Grayson Perry) and the curation of A Clockwork Jerusalem at the British Pavilion as part of the 2014 Venice Biennale.

== Major works and awards ==
- Islington Square, a development of social housing in Manchester, completed in 2006
- According to the group's website they have received Architecture Foundation New Generation Award 2006, FX Best Public Building Award 2006 and a 2007 RIBA European Award
- Saint Lucas Art Academy (redesign) in Boxtel, the Netherlands, a makeover of building constructed in the 1960s
- Woodward Place building, United Kingdom
- "In a Lonely Place" installation RIBA (2006)
- Bicycle surveillance shelter, Scheveningen (featured on a Dutch stamp)
- BBC TV production centre facade, Cardiff (2011)
- Heerlijkheid in Hoogvliet, the Netherlands community building *A House for Essex, built for Alain de Botton
- Blue House in London
- BBC Cardiff, 3.6 ha village in Roath Basin
- Community In A Cube in Middlesbrough, an 82-home development
- Bentley Library in the Midlands
- A House for Essex, Wrabness, designed by Charles Holland based on ideas by the artist Grayson Perry (2015). Subject of a Channel 4 documentary in May 2015.
