= Wrabness =

Village in Essex, England

Coordinates: 51.9396°N 1.1673°E

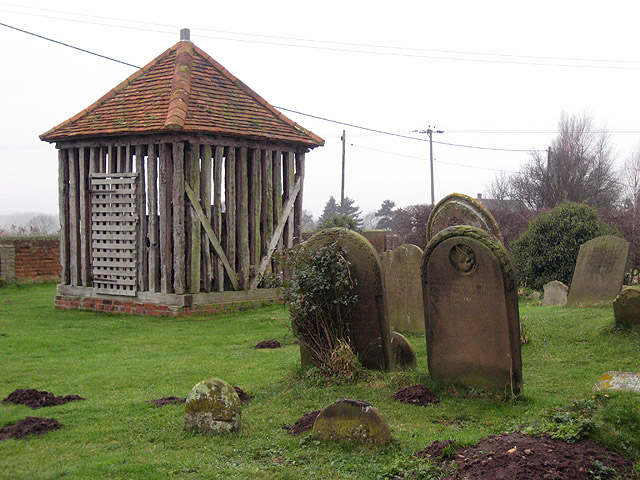
- Wooden bell cage, Wrabness church yard

- Location within Essex
- Population: 369 (Parish, 2021)
- OS grid reference: TM222417
- Civil parish: Wrabness
- District: Tendring
- Shire county: Essex
- Region: East
- Country: England
- Sovereign state: United Kingdom
- Post town: Manningtree
- Postcode district: CO11
- Dialling code: 01255
- Police: Essex
- Fire: Essex
- Ambulance: East of England
- UK Parliament: Harwich and North Essex

Wrabness is a small village and civil parish near Manningtree, Essex, England. The village is located six miles (10 km) west of Harwich, in North Essex on the banks of the River Stour. At the 2021 census the parish had a population of 369.

== History ==
Wrabness at the time of the Domesday Book, was owned by Bury St Edmunds Abbey, with a population of 20 households and was rented to a chief and two Lords of the Manor at an annual value of £6 to the abbey. Wrabness is an Anglo-Saxon name, coming from the cape of Saxon called or nicknamed Wrabba, however it has also been stated that the name comes from the location of the Ness on the River Stour. The village had been recorded as being spelt as Warbenase, Wrabnes, Wrabnashe and Wrabbenase. The parish was one of the divisions of Tendring Hundred, and from 1834, part of the Tendring Poor Union. The village had a population of 253 in 1821, but this had shrunk down to 248 by 1831.

A Wesleyan Chapel was built in 1845, replacing a former converted barn that had been used since 1825, however, by 1863, the population had shrunk down further to 226. In April 1871, the courts ruled that the Lord of the Manor, Edgar Walter Garland, did not have the right to seize property from his tenants when it had been passed to a family member through a will. By 1881, the population had again decreased to 210. In 1908, a new Wesleyan chapel was built to replace the earlier building, but this building closed for the final time in 1992.

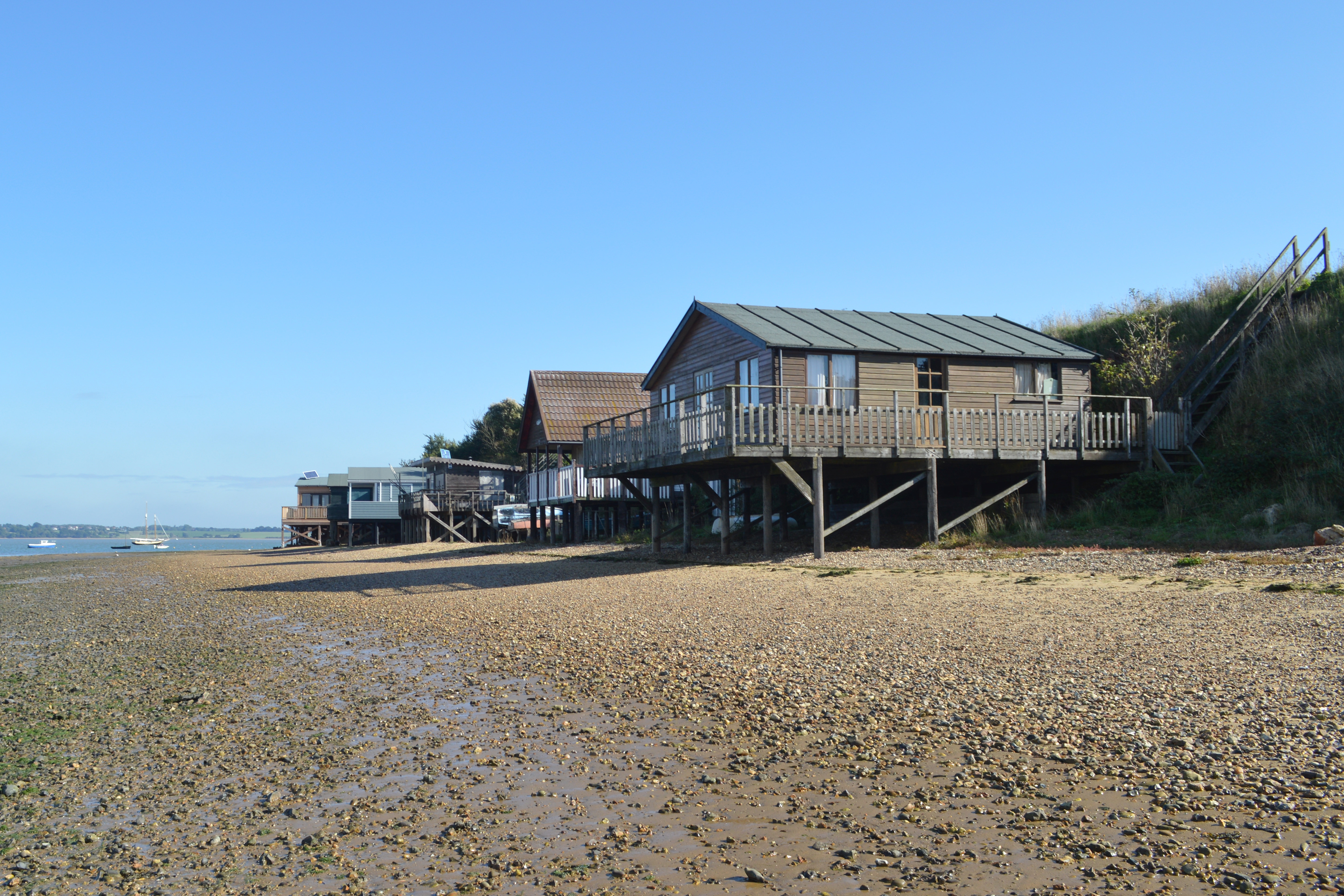
The large beach huts in 2013

From 1921, some large beach huts were built on the foreshore fronting on the beach, now numbering about thirty. In 1985, the foreshore area which had been owned by the Garnham family was sold to a company set up by the Wrabness Foreshore Tenants Association.

=== The Royal Navy Mine Depot ===
The largest enterprise and main employer in Wrabness between 1921 and 1963 was the Royal Navy Mine Depot, where thousands of mines were stored for laying in the North Sea. Men from the Depot won medals for defusing enemy mines and handling dangerous ammunition for the Navy at nearby Parkeston Quay. During World War II, a bombing decoy site was set up at Spinneys Farm at Wix to protect the site. After its decommissioning, the government had planned to make the site into a Category C prison, which was objected to by the local MP, Julian Ridsdale in 1969. However, in 1971, the Architects Co-Partnership designed a new prison for the site which had similarities with HM Prison Maze H-Blocks. The development failed to happen and the site was purchased to become the Wrabness Nature Reserve.

== Geology ==
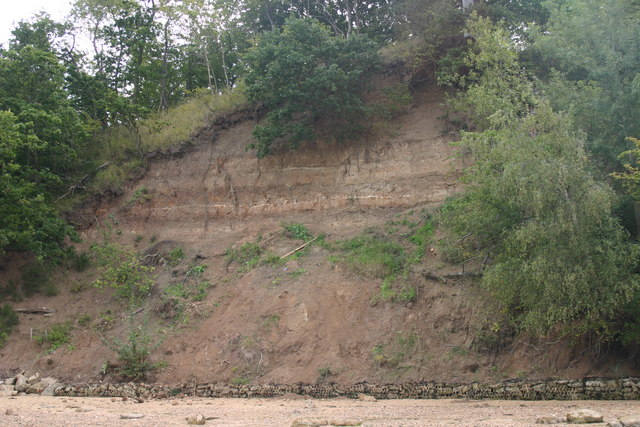
Wrabness cliff

Wrabness is a designated under a Geological Conservation Review because of the Wrabness Member, which is part of the Harwich Formation, and London Clay, and is characterized by tuffaceous clayey silts and silty clays, with distinct ash layers and tephra layers.

In 1701, Reverend Robert Rich, rector of Wrabness, found fossils at Wrabness which he credited at the time as being from Elephants that brought by Emperor Claudius during his invasion of Britain. This was later dismissed as inaccurate and in fact belonged to a Mammoth, with further Mammoth bones found in 1906. Wrabness foreshore is a well known location in the United Kingdom to find fossils, with finds including bones of deer, horse and whale from the Red Crag, and turtles, seashells, and shark and fish teeth from within the cement stones and pyrite concretions within the London Clay. It is the best location in the United Kingdom to find fossilised fruit and seeds that have been preserved in the London Clay.

== Governance ==
=== Parliamentary seat ===
Wrabness comes under the Harwich and North Essex Parliamentary constituency, which Bernard Jenkin of the Conservative Party has held since its creation in 2010.

Prior to being in the Harwich and North Essex Parliamentary constituency, Wrabness parish sat within the following constituencies:

Constituency name	Years of operation	Reference
Essex	1290–1832	
North Essex	1832–1868	
East Essex	1868–1918	
Harwich	1918–1997	
North Essex	1997–2010	

=== Local authorities ===
Wrabness sits within the non-metropolitan county of Essex, governed Essex County Council and the non-Metropolitan district of Tendring, which is governed by Tendring District Council. The village was until 2024 in the Tendring district ward of Bradfield, Wrabness and Wix. However in 2019, Wrabness became part of the new Stour Valley ward. Wrabness Parish Council is the lowest level of local government.

== Demography ==
=== Ethnicity ===
At the 2021 census, Wrabness population was recorded as having the following breakdown of ethnicity:

Ethnicity background	% of population - Wrabness	% of population - U.K.
Asian, Asian British or Asian Welsh	2.4	9.6
Black, Black British, Black Welsh, Caribbean or African	0.0	4.2
Mixed or Multiple ethnic groups	1.4	3.0
White	96.2	81.0
Other ethnic groups	0.0	2.2

=== Age Groups ===
At the 2021 census, it was recorded that the population consisted of 160 households, that fell into the following age groups:

Age group	% of population - Wrabness	% of population - U.K.
0-4	2.2%	4.4%
5-9	4.3	5.8
10-14	4.1	6.1
15-19	5.2	5.8
20-24	2.7	6.0
25-29	1.1	6.5
30-34	3.8	7.0
35-39	5.2	6.8
40-44	4.6	6.5
45-49	7.6	6.1
50-54	6.0	6.8
55-59	9.0	6.7
60-64	10.3	5.9
65-69	8.7	4.9
70-74	11.7	4.7
75-79	5.7	4.0
80-84	3.8	2.5
85 and over	4.1	2.5

=== Economics and Education ===
In the 2021 census it was recorded that the working population in Wrabness completed the following hours per week:

Hours per week	% of population - Wrabness	% of population - U.K.
Part-time - 15 hours or less worked	16.6	10.3
Part-time - 16 to 30 hours worked	27.0	19.5
Full-time - 31 to 48 hours worked	41.7	59.1
Full-time - 49 or more hours worked	14.7	11.1

For those who did work, the breakdown at the 2021 census of the distance people travelled to work ir worked from home was:

Distance travelled to work	% of population - Wrabness	% of population - U.K.
Works mainly from home	33.3	31.5
Less than 10km	24.8	35.4
10km to less than 30km	23.0	14.4
30km and over	4.2	4.3
Other	14.5	14.5

At the 2021 census, those of the population over the age of 16 had the following qualifications:

Level of qualifications	% of population - Wrabness	% of population - U.K.
No qualifications	15.8	18.1
Level 1, 2 or 3 qualifications	38.4	39.9
Apprenticeship	6.8	5.3
Level 4 qualifications and above	37.2	33.9
Other qualifications	1.9	2.8

== Transport ==
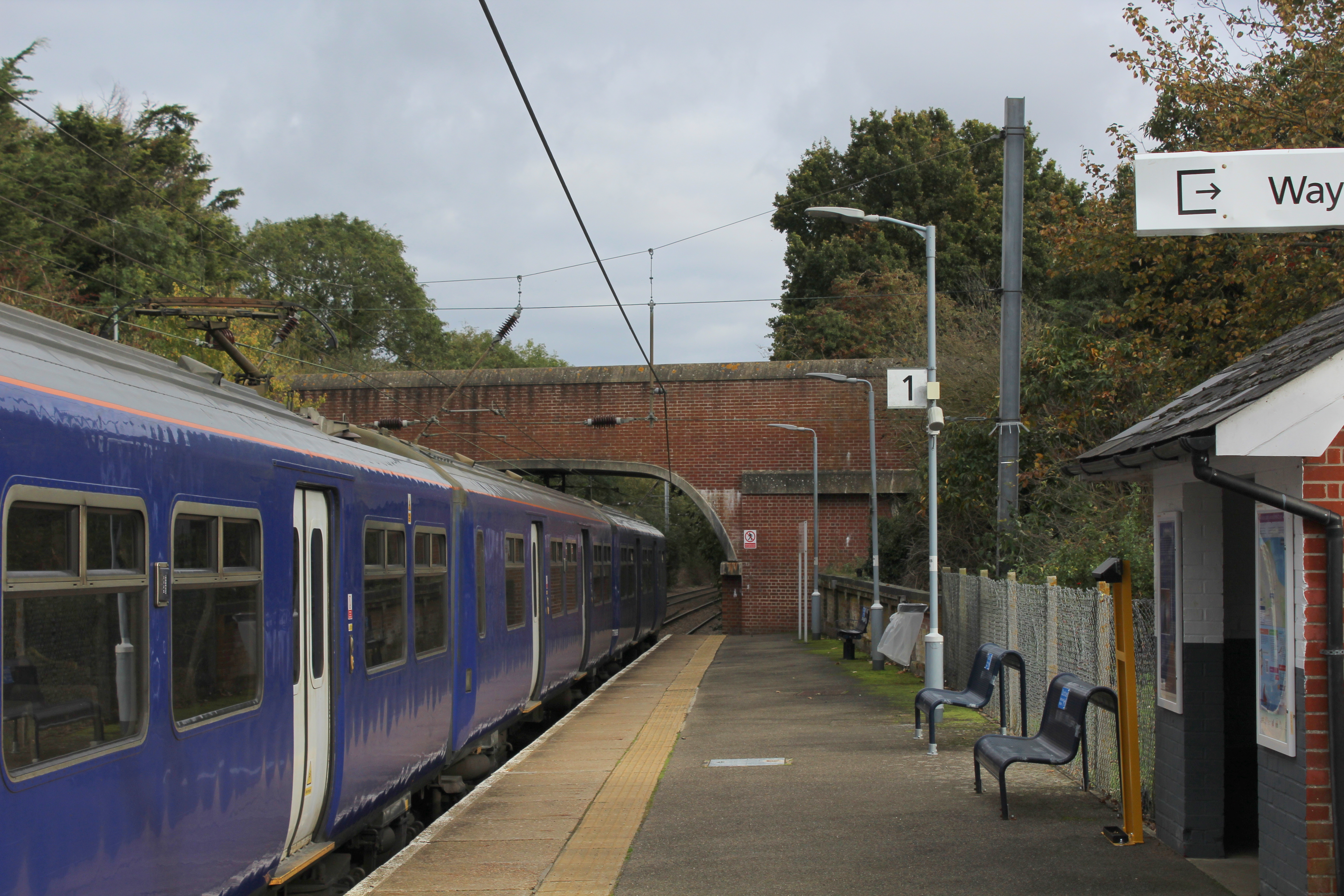
Wrabness station

Wrabness is served by Wrabness railway station on the Mayflower branch line of the Great Eastern Main Line. The station opened in 1854. The village was previously served by the First Essex bus service no. 103, but this was withdrawn in 2023. A community bus service is now available.

== Buildings and structures ==
Wrabness has eight properties that are listed on the National Heritage List for England.

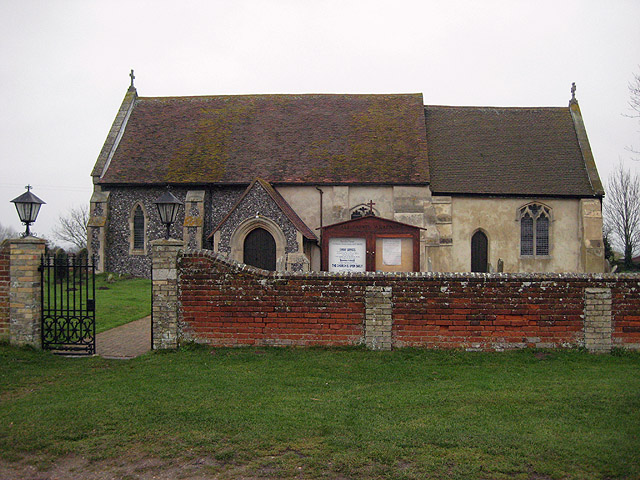
All Saints, Wrabness

The oldest building in the village is All Saints' Church, which dates from around the 12th century and is listed as Grade II*. The church's bell tower collapsed in the seventeenth century, and the bell was moved temporarily to a wooden bell cage in the churchyard, which is now Grade II listed.

=== Grayson Perry's "Julie’s House" ===
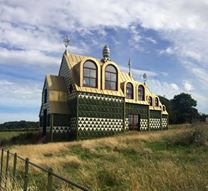
A House for Essex ("Julie's House"), a commission for Living Architecture.

In 2015 the external work was completed on the holiday home, created by Grayson Perry working with Fashion Architecture Taste (FAT). Known as A House for Essex or Julie's House, it was built over the River Stour, as a commission for the charity Living Architecture. The house encapsulates the story of Julie May Cope, a fictional Essex woman, "born in a flood-struck Canvey Island in 1953 and mown down last year by a curry delivery driver in Colchester". Writing in The Daily Telegraph, Ellis Woodman said, "Sporting a livery of green and white ceramic tiles, telephone-box red joinery and a gold roof, it is not easy to miss. ... Decoration is everywhere: from the external tiles embossed with motifs referencing Julie's rock-chick youth to extravagant tapestries recording her life's full narrative. Perry has contributed ceramic sculptures, modelled on Irish Sheelanagigs, which celebrate her as a kind of latter-day earth mother while the delivery driver's moped has even been repurposed as a chandelier suspended above the double-height living room."

Perry made a variety of artwork used inside the house, depicting Julie Cope's life. He made a series of large-scale tapestries, The Essex House Tapestries: The Life of Julie Cope, which include "A Perfect Match" (2015) and "In Its Familiarity, Golden" (2015), and for the bedrooms, "Julie and Rob" (2013) and "Julie and Dave" (2015). He also wrote an essay, "The Ballad of Julie Cope" (2015) and created a series of black and white woodcuts, Six Snapshots of Julie (2015). Perry also released the series in a signed colour edition of 68. The work was shown in an exhibition, Grayson Perry: The Life of Julie Cope, at Firstsite in Colchester, Essex, from January to February 2018.

=== Listed buildings and structures ===
Title	List entry number	Date first listed	Grade Listing	Description	National grid reference
Wrabness Hall Farmhouse	1112075	30 January 1987	Grade II	Late medieval and 16th century farmhouse	TM 17553 31881
Barn, 60 metres West of Wrabness Hall Farmhouse	1237532	30 January 1991	Grade II	18th century Weatherboard timber barn	TM 17471 31896
Butler's Farmhouse	1307203	30 January 1987	Grade II	19th century Red Flemish brick house	TM 17603 30403
Foxes Farmhouse	1112077	30 January 1987	Grade II	16th century timber framed weatherboarded house	TM 17267 30856
Bellhouse 12 metres South-west of the Parish Church of All Saints	1147875	30 January 1987	Grade II	18th century timber bellhouse	TM 17411 31874
Parish Church of All Saints	1112074	30 January 1987	Grade II*	12th century church	TM 17424 31889
The Old Rectory	1112076	30 January 1987	Grade II	Early 19th century Gault and Red Flemish brick house	TM 18412 31436
The Firs	1147889	30 January 1987	Grade II	Late medieval house extended in the 19th century	TM 17452 30632

== Wrabness Nature Reserve ==
Wrabness Nature Reserve
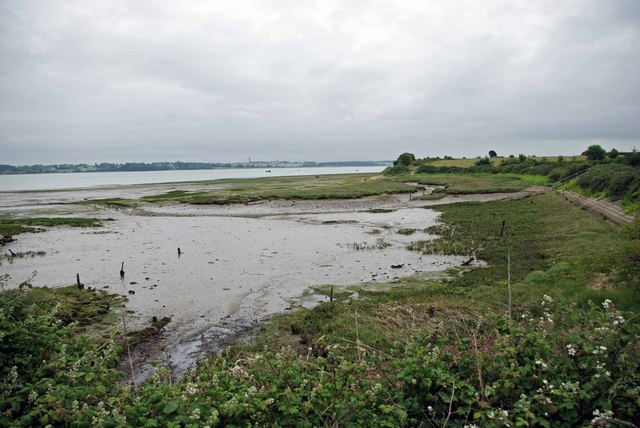
- River Stour and Wrabness Nature Reserve
- Interactive map of Wrabness Nature Reserve
- Type: Local Nature Reserve
- Location: Wrabness, Essex
- OS grid: TM161316
- Area: 27.0 hectares (67 acres)
- Manager: Essex Wildlife Trust

Wrabness Nature Reserve is a Local Nature Reserve that was designated in 1993. It covers 52 acres (210,000 m^{2}) on the banks of the Stour Estuary, a 2,523 hectare biological and geological Site of Special Scientific Interest which stretches from Manningtree to Harwich in Essex and Suffolk. The site was once a former mine depot established in 1921 by the Ministry of Defence. It was closed in 1963. Following closure, a number of planning applications were put forward (including an application for a prison in 1968 and 1989). The site was saved from closure when it was bought by Wrabness Nature Reserve Charitable Trust in 1992. The site has now been taken over by the Essex Wildlife Trust.

This site has grassland, marsh, scrub and woodland. It has a diverse bird life, such as yellowhammers, whitethroats, song thrushes and short-eared owls. There are also winter visitors including black-tailed godwits, grey plovers and turnstones. Plants include corn mints and hairy buttercups, and there is a wide variety of invertebrates. The grassland is grazed to prevent the vegetation from becoming too coarse.

There is access from Wheatsheaf Lane.

== Notable people ==
- Clive Owen (born 3 October 1964), actor, owned a second home in Wrabness.
