= Queen Elizabeth Hall =

Concert hall in London

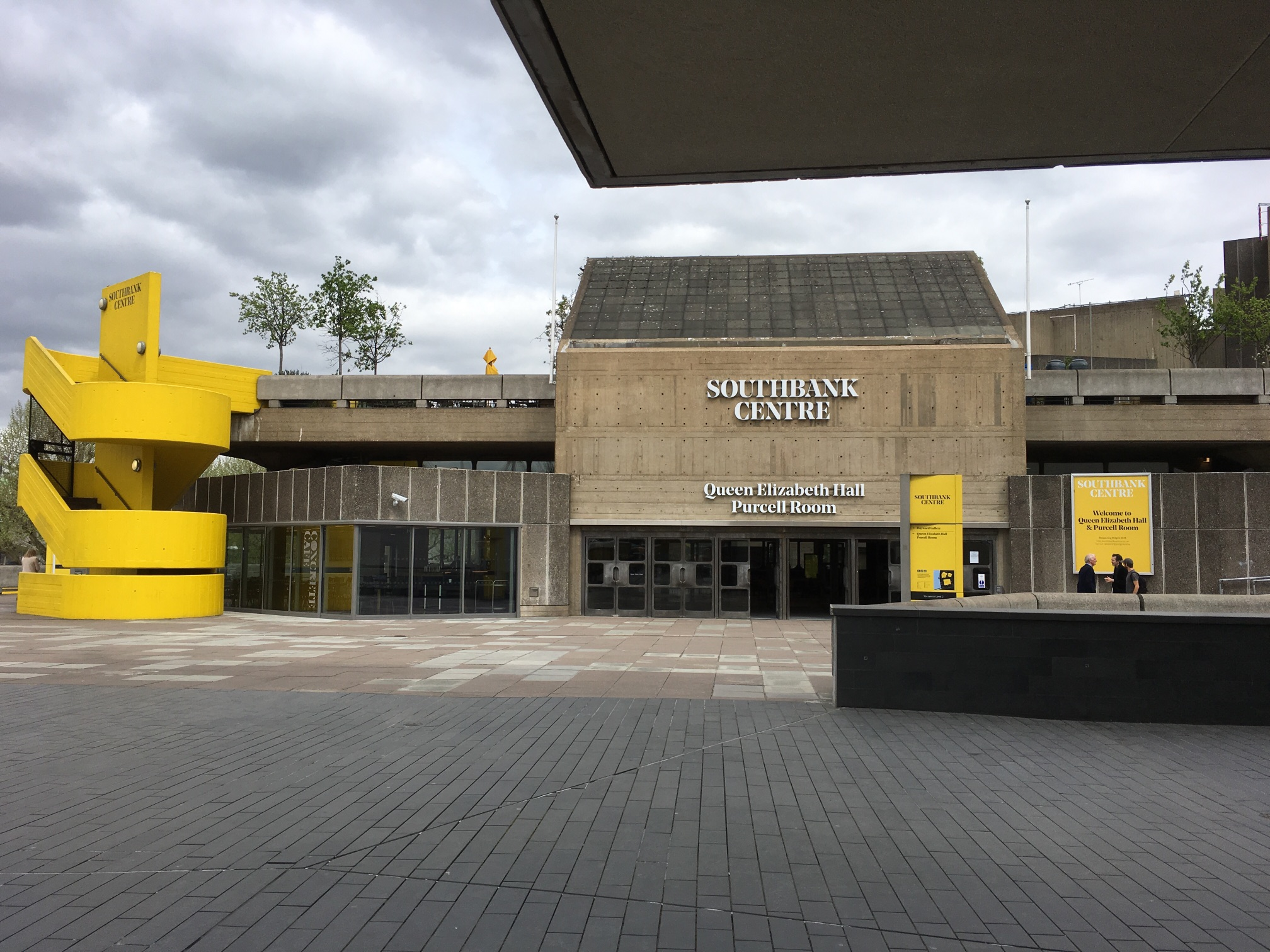
- Exterior view of venue (c.2018)

General information
- Architectural style: Brutalist
- Location: Belvedere Road, London SE1, England
- Coordinates: 51°30′24″N 00°06′58.9″W
- Opened: 1 March 1967

Design and construction
- Architects: Hubert Bennett; Jack Whittle; F.G West; Geoffrey Horsefall
- Structural engineer: Ove Arup & Partners
- Main contractor: Higgs and Hill

Renovating team
- Architect: FCB Studios

Other information
- Seating capacity: 916

The Queen Elizabeth Hall (QEH) is a music venue on the South Bank in London, England, that hosts classical, jazz, and avant-garde music, talks and dance performances. It was opened in 1967, with a concert conducted by Benjamin Britten.

The QEH was built along with the smaller Purcell Room as part of Southbank Centre arts complex. It stands alongside the Royal Festival Hall, which was built for the Festival of Britain of 1951, and the Hayward Gallery which opened in 1968.

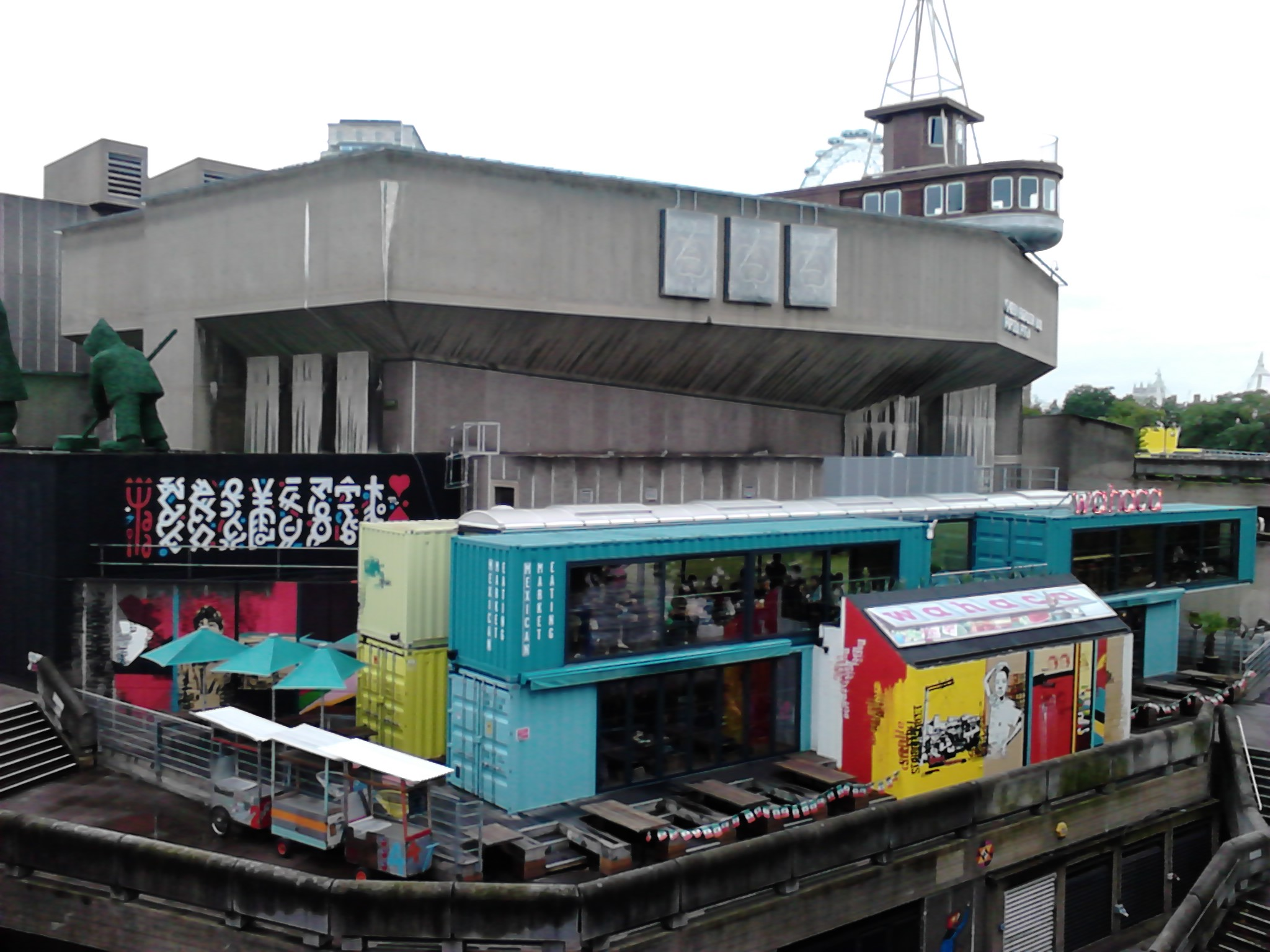
Queen Elizabeth Hall - auditorium building with later added restaurant on walkway

== History ==
The QEH stands on the site of a former shot tower, built as part of a lead works in 1826 and retained for the Festival of Britain. The QEH and the Purcell Room were built together by Higgs and Hill and opened in March 1967.

The venue was closed for two years of renovations in September 2015, and reopened in April 2018.

== Description ==
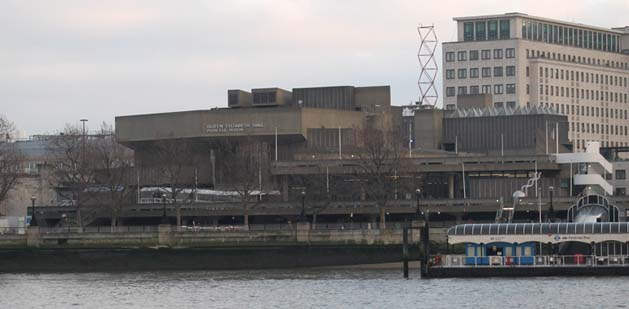
Queen Elizabeth Hall from across the river Thames in 2009

The QEH has over 900 seats and the Purcell Room in the same building has 360 seats. The two auditoriums were designed by a team led by Hubert Bennett, head of the architects department of the Greater London Council, with Jack Whittle, F.G. West and Geoffrey Horsefall. They form part of the Southbank Centre arts complex along with the larger Royal Festival Hall (RFH) and an art gallery, the Hayward Gallery (opened in October 1968).

The sculpture Zemran in stainless steel (by William Pye, 1972) stands on the riverside terrace of the QEH.

== Architecture ==
=== Introduction ===
The design of the QEH was intended to show to a high degree the separate masses and elements of the building, to avoid competing with the scale and presence of the RFH. The QEH uses minimal decoration and was designed to allow circulation at multiple levels around the building. The focus is primarily on the internal spaces, which as originally designed had very limited fenestration except for the (deeply inset) sweep along the river frontage of the foyer building.

The original arrangements provided for circulation above and below the foyer (no longer allowed for security reasons, although the roof terrace has been opened for the Summer of Fun festival in 2011), right around the sides and rear of the two auditoriums, and also a bridge link to the Hayward Gallery. The powerful forms and austere materials are an example of brutalist architecture, and the design also highlights the plasticity of concrete.

=== Foyer ===
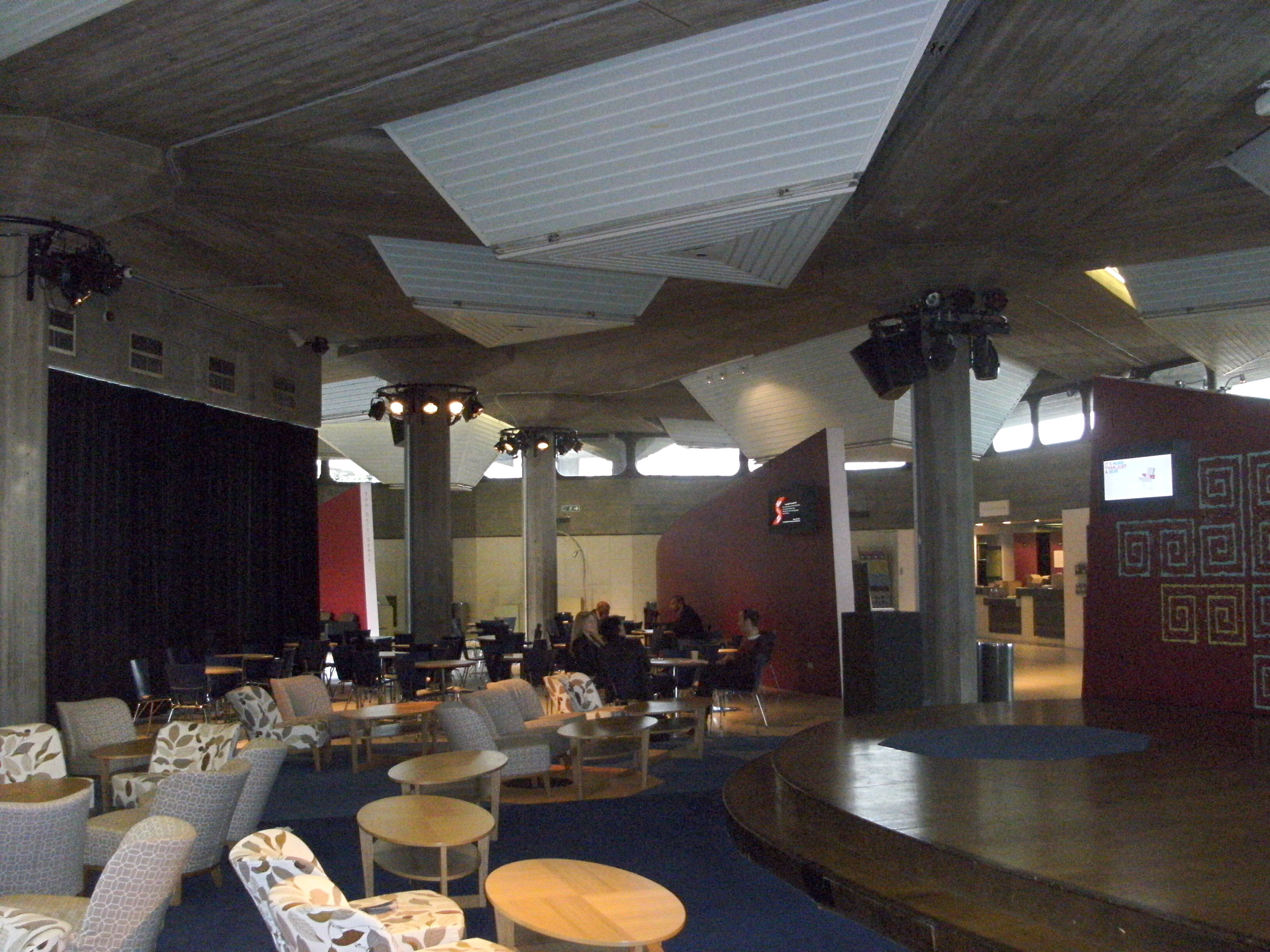
The foyer in 2011

The foyer is at first-floor level, and the foyer building is supported on octagonal reinforced concrete columns, with an undercroft below, and is vee-shaped. The two arms of the vee-shape are linked to the QEH auditorium by cast concrete tubes, reminiscent of a spaceship's docking arrangement. The provision of only two entrances to the auditorium causes congestion and slow exit for audiences. This is also a consequence of the decision to place all the foyer facilities on a single level, even though there is a significant descent to the auditorium entrance level, and steps are required up to the Purcell Room level. The foyer is an irregular shape to accommodate the angle between the axes of Waterloo Bridge and the north-east side of the RFH.

A notable feature of the QEH is the interior of the foyer building, with its intimate scale and subtle use of materials, and the terrace overlooking Queen's Walk. The original 1960s cool of this area had been largely lost owing to the intrusion of artificial partitions, to provide smaller areas for various activities by day as well as in the evening, in the 2000s. The extensive foyer was restored during the renovation works of 2016–18, with better integration of access for persons of reduced mobility. The bar area was extended to the south onto part of the external terrace with new glazing to bring more light into the foyer.

The main entrance to the foyer is from walkway level near the north end of the terrace of the RFH. To see the intended effect this should be viewed head-on from the north corner of the RFH. The entrance, in brutalist style, is in the form of a horizontal slit in the concrete structure, with six pairs of cast aluminium doors.

A smaller entrance is provided at ground level, originally intended to be for visitors set down by car (circulation of traffic under the Waterloo Bridge approach was possible before the Museum of the Moving Image building was constructed in the 1980s) or coming from the car park under the Hayward Gallery. This entrance also appears to have led to the undercroft, but that access is now blocked off. An internal staircase leads to the foyer level from this lower entrance, past the original box office area. Lavatories take up the south-east wall of the foyer building, and are housed in a structure extending out towards the centre access road.

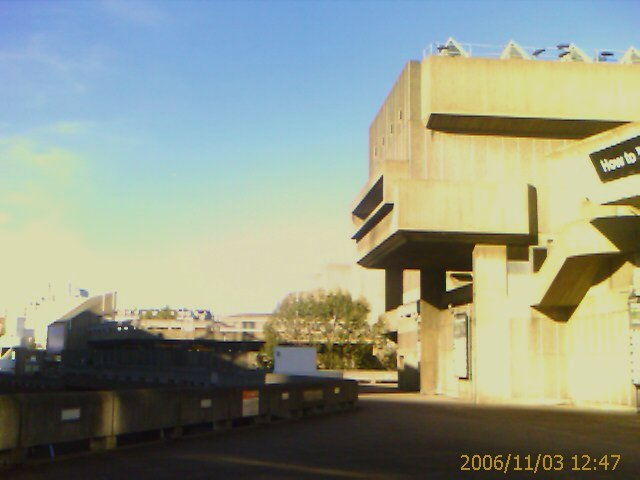
QEH foyer building with the Hayward Gallery to right

The building's appearance works best by night, especially when approached from the eastern one of Golden Jubilee Footbridges beside Hungerford Bridge.

After being closed for many years, the roof terrace and bridge to the Hayward Gallery were reopened in 2011, with the creation of a new external gallery and a roof garden and café, in partnership with the Eden Project in Cornwall. This reopened one of the most interesting pedestrian circulation possibilities of the original design. The roof terrace is reached by the external concrete staircase at the west corner on Queen's Walk near Festival Pier, which also leads to the lower level and the route to Festival Square. A crude disabled ramp, constructed of breeze blocks and bricks, has been added to the walkway between the QEH entrance and the Hayward Gallery.

=== Auditorium ===
The QEH auditorium is a separate building from the foyer. The auditorium building is aligned with the rear of its stage parallel to Waterloo Bridge and the seating area cantilevered out towards the foyer, supported by a massive column containing the emergency escape staircases at the rear.

The north-west facade, by Waterloo Bridge, although stained by pollution and rainwater, is a good example of the massive concrete forms popular in 1960s brutalist architecture in Britain. A slightly raised area, resembling a low stage is provided facing Waterloo Bridge. This may have been intended for outdoor performances.

A great concrete "prow", encasing the air conditioning ducting, protrudes towards the Thames along the side of the auditorium at roof level. The walkway area below this feature is on the roof of a utility building, and a branch of the restaurant chain Wahaca has been installed in a set of containers there, in 2012. Ventilation services are provided from a plant room on the roof of the Purcell Room via a massive concrete duct between the buildings leading into the QEH roof, and a concrete tower leading to the concrete duct on the north-east edge of the foyer building roof.

The acoustic properties of the Queen Elizabeth Hall are judged to be generally excellent. The acoustical properties of the Hall when examined in 1968 by music critics and engineers following a period of testing, trials and adjustment, were found to be of "general excellence" in the three key areas of: a) Reverberation Time, which in this Hall is mainly adjusted by opening and closing cavities in the vertical wood panels on both sides, b) Tone and Definition, by allowing diffusion with minimum use of deflectors over the seating area rather than the platform, and finally c) 'Singing' Tone produced here as in all excellent halls by a substantial height of the auditorium which, in the QEH's case, although the rear stalls are steeply raked, the ceiling is 25 feet (7.6 m) above the highest seats to the ceiling. (Trends in Concert-Hall Acoustics and the Elizabeth Hall C. L. S. Gilford The Musical Times Vol. 109 No 1499 Jan. 1968)

There have inevitably been many alterations and adaptation of the Hall, particularly in recent years, involving increasing the size of the platform and rigging extra specialised lighting arrays which allow the staging of dance and comedy productions. This had adversely impacted on the Hall's acoustics, in particular in the area of tone and definition by increasing deflection in the platform area. As part of the refurbishment work of 2015–18, a retracting gantry was provided at ceiling level reducing this intrusion when not required.

=== Undercroft ===
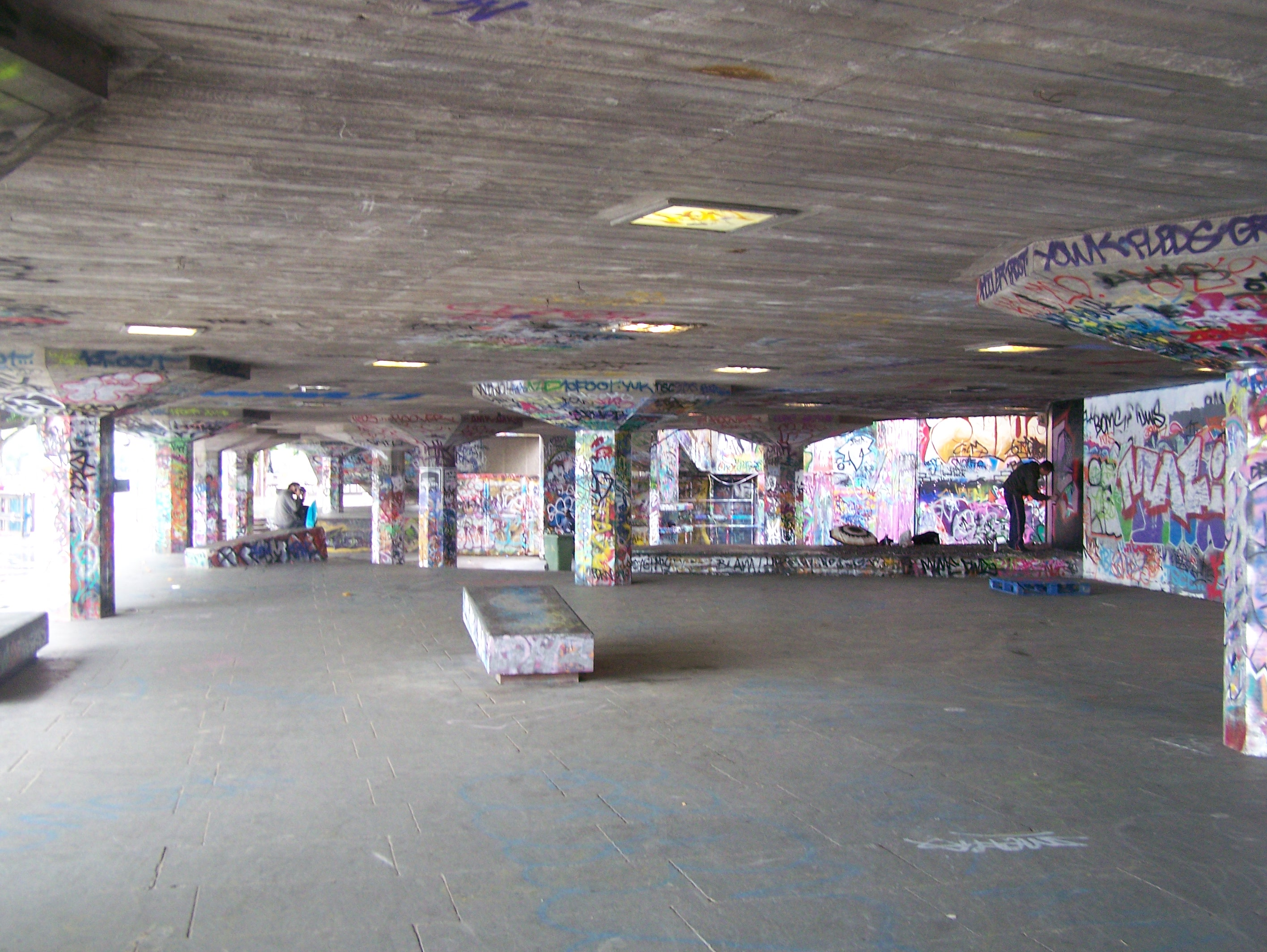
The Undercroft

The undercroft of the foyer building has been popular with skateboarders since the early 1970s and it is widely acknowledged to be London's most distinctive and popular skateboarding area. Opened in 1967 as a pedestrian walkway, it was first used by skateboarders in 1973 as the architectural features were found to be perfect for skateboard tricks. Unlike skateparks which are designed specifically with skateboarding and BMX in mind, the undercroft is not a skatepark but a found space, and still considered by the users as a street spot. The area is now used by skateboarders, BMXers, graffiti artists, taggers, photographers, and performance artists, among others. A photographic archive of the graffiti can be found at The Graffiti Archaeology Project. Although this informal activity, social and arts scene is a distinctive feature of the Southbank Centre site, it was proposed that the area would be redeveloped. However a statement from the Prime Minister's office (reported in Time Out, in August 2008) cited the importance of the undercroft for these uses.

The Southbank Centre, as part of its £120 million proposed Festival Wing development, sought to insert café and shop units in the Undercroft space partly to fund new performance spaces in the new buildings to be built above parts of the Queen Elizabeth Hall and to move the skate space to a new location under Hungerford Bridge about 120 metres away. This was opposed by the Long Live Southbank Campaign which gained the support of Mayor Boris Johnson in early 2014, leading to the suspension of the Festival Wing proposals.

Long Live Southbank and the Southbank Centre agreed a refurbishment programme for the Undercroft space which was subsequently carried out.

=== Roof ===
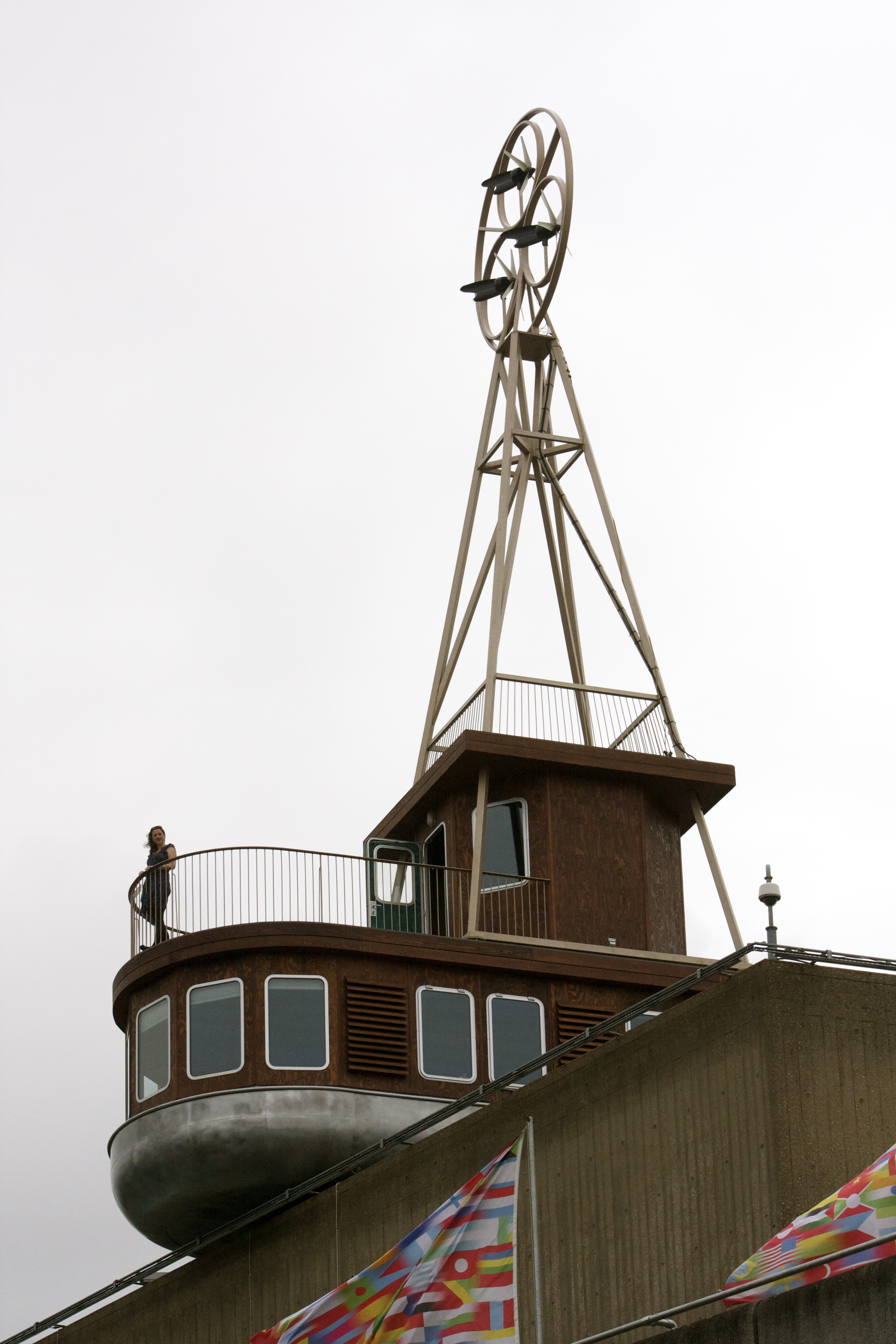
A Room For London viewed from the South Bank in 2012

Since 2012, the temporary structure A Room for London has been located on top of the auditorium building. The structure, designed by architect David Kohn is described as "a one-bedroom installation" and is shaped to appear like a boat perched on top of a building.

== Recent developments ==
In 2005–06, the South Bank Centre and Arts Council considered reconstruction or replacement of the QEH and Purcell Room by two new auditoriums, each of approximately 1,100 seats, one for classical music and one for amplified music and contemporary dance performances. This would have posed significant architectural challenges, given the constrained site and the close proximity of the Royal Festival Hall. In 2013, proposals were commissioned from Feilden Clegg Bradley for the Festival Wing scheme of the Southbank Centre, but this scheme did not proceed.

The whole 1960s complex including the Queen Elizabeth Hall, Purcell Room and Hayward Gallery, underwent complete internal refurbishment under the banner "Let the Light In" from 2015 to 2018, to designs by the architecture practice Feilden Clegg Bradley. The work does not cover any major cleaning or work to the exteriors. The Arts Council granted £10 million, the remainder being raised by sponsorship, such as seat-naming, and private donations.

Although none of these buildings are listed or protected the Southbank Centre has consistently opposed petitions to the government for listing so that it can maintain as much flexibility to make changes as part of future development of this area of the site in accordance with its masterplan in the future, the level and standard of restoration and renewal carried out was commensurate with the building's significance and standing.
