= David Kohn (architect) =

British architect (born 1972)

- Born: 3 October 1972 (age 54)
Further information
Occupation	Architect
Awards	Manser Medal (2023); RIBA House of the Year (2022); World Interior of the Year (2013); Young Architect of the Year (2009)
- Practice: David Kohn Architects
- Buildings: (2025) House on a Hill, London; (2025) Hasselt Beguinage, Hasselt, Belgium; (2015–2024) Gradel Quadrangles, New College, Oxford; (2024) Modern Art Oxford, Oxford; (2023) Stephen Friedman Gallery, London; (2022) Cowshed, Devon; (2022) Greenwich Design District, London; (2020) Red House, Dorset; (2017–2018) V&A Photography Centre; (2012–2020) Institute of Contemporary Arts, London; (2014) Sotheby's S|2, London; (2012) A Room for London, Living Architecture; (2012) The White Building, Hackney Wick, London; (2012) Carrer Avinyó, Barcelona; (2011) Thomas Dane Gallery, Mayfair, London; (2010) Skyroom, London (2009) Stable Acre, Norfolk; (2008) Flash at the Royal Academy of Arts, London

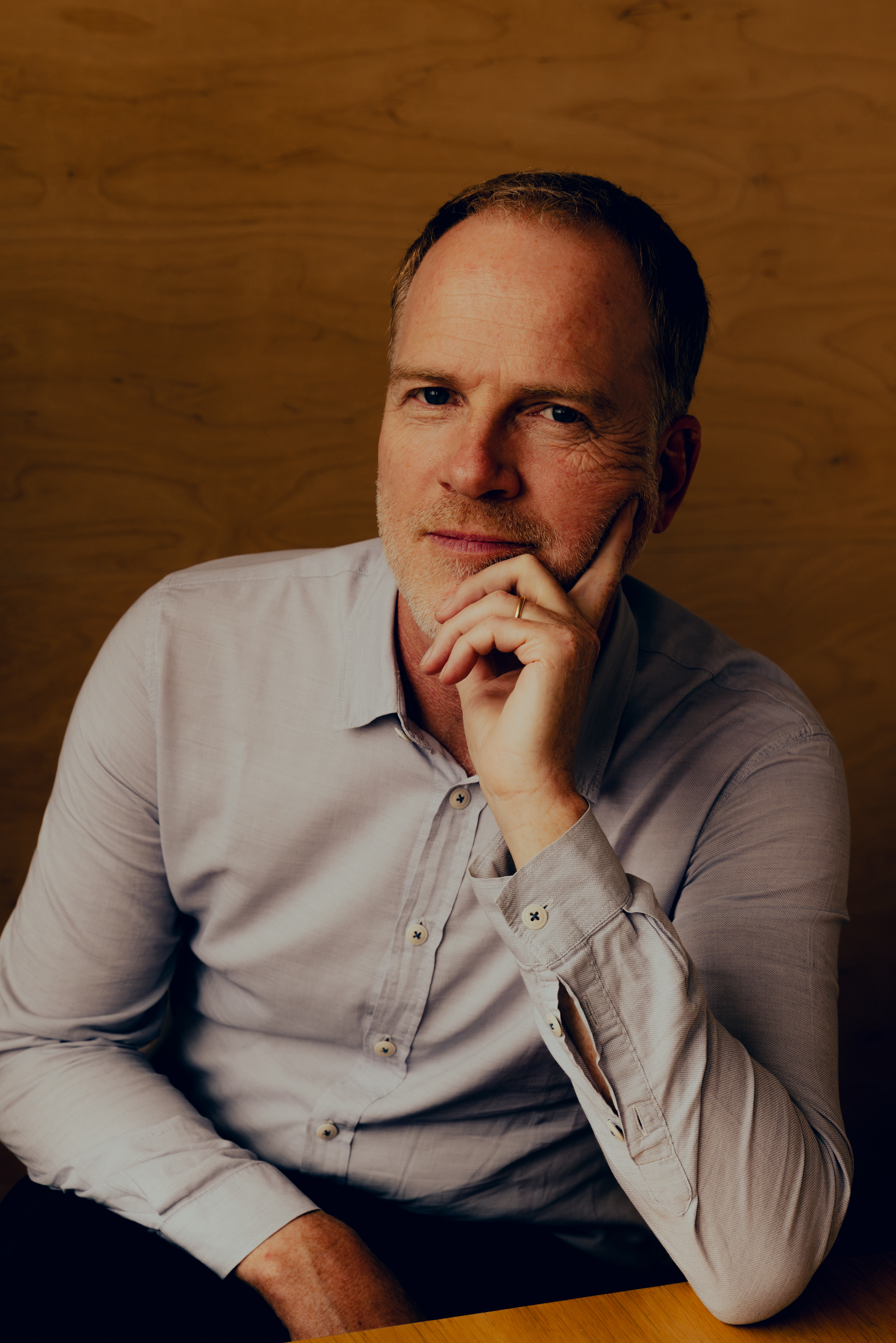
David Kohn - photography credit Alixe Lay

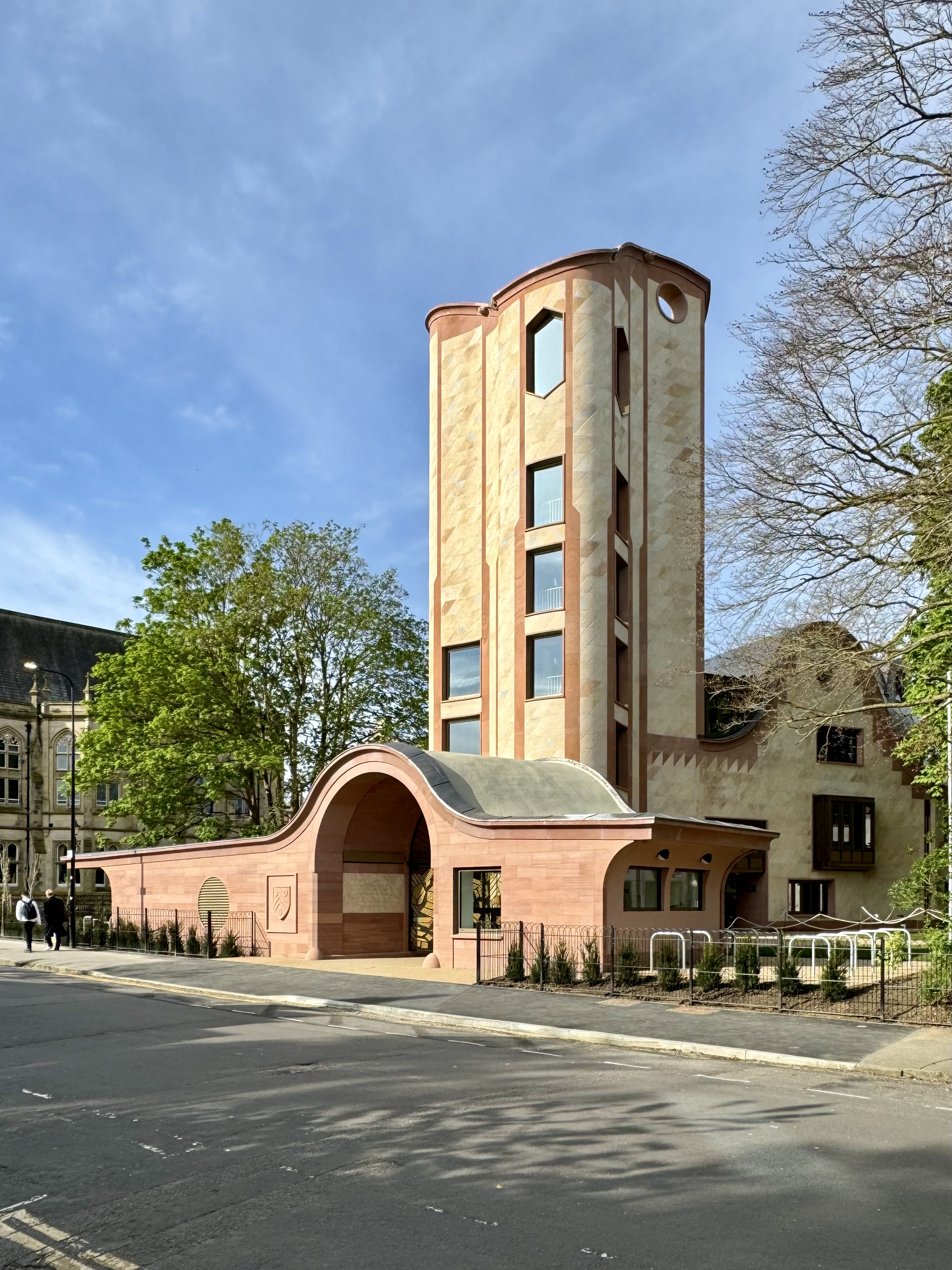
The Gradel Quadrangles, New College Oxford by David Kohn Architects

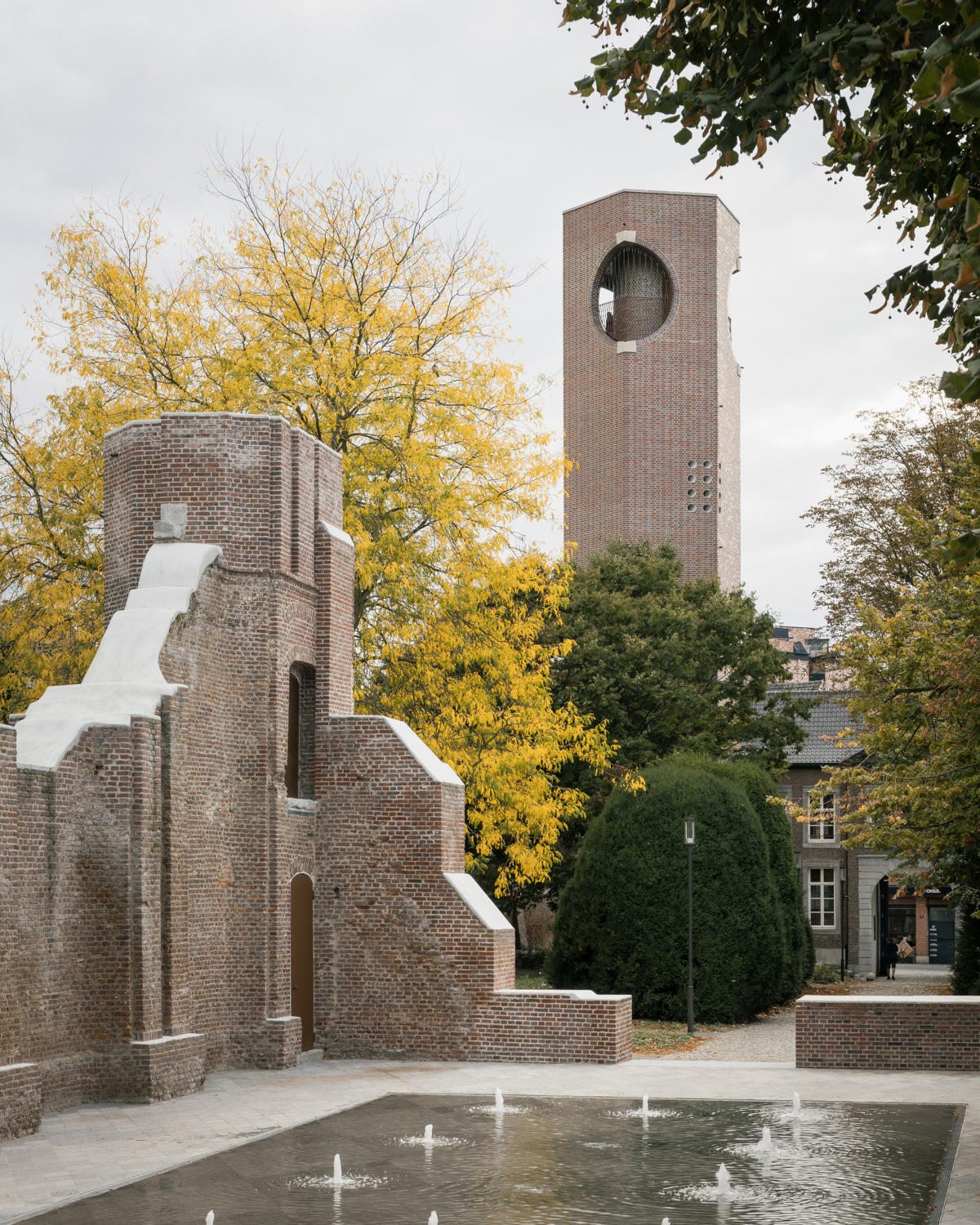
Hasselt Beguinage by Bovenbouw Architectuur and David Kohn Architects. Photography credit © Stijn Bollaert

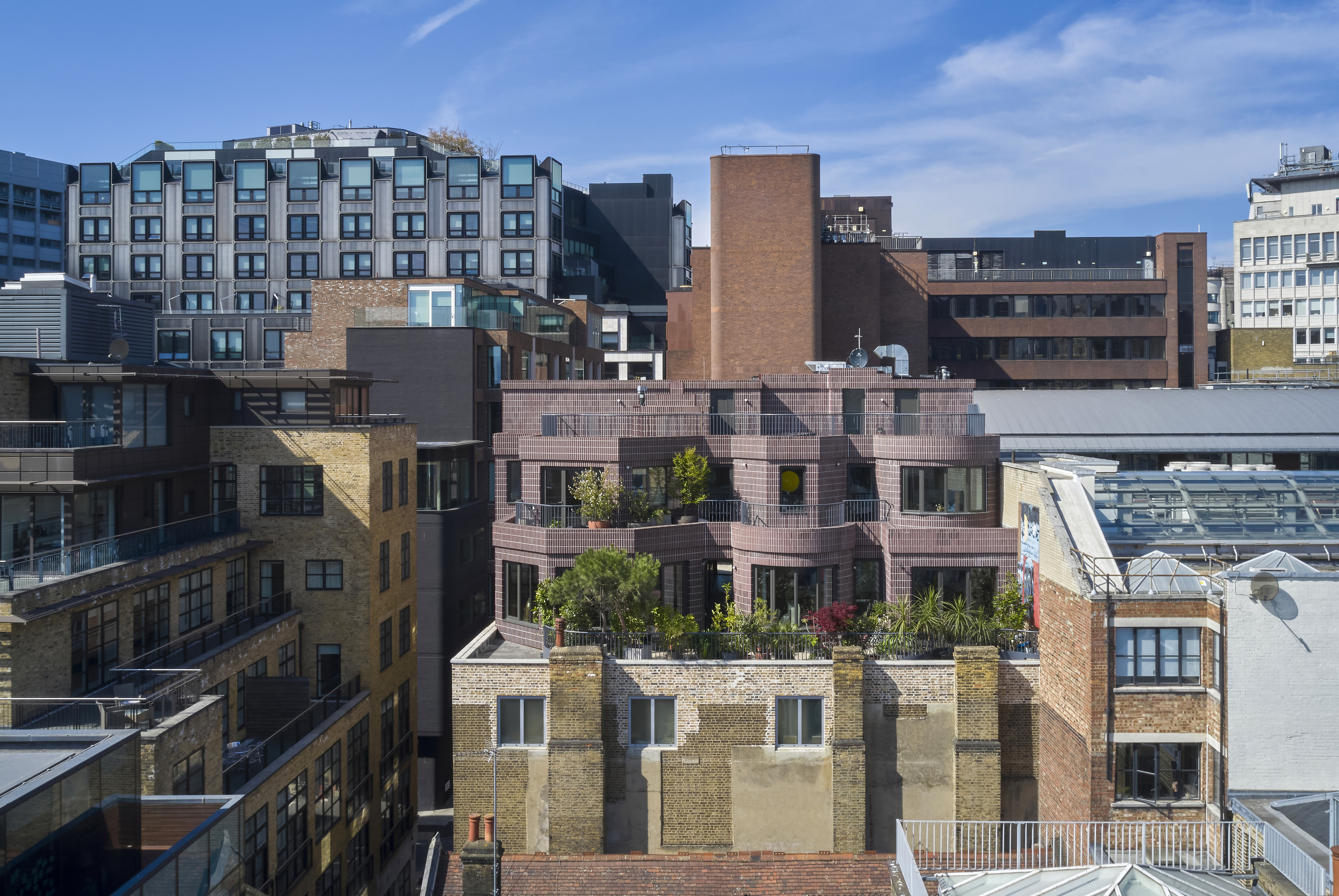
House on a Hill by David Kohn Architects. Photography by Will Pryce

David Kohn (born 3 October 1972) is a British architect. His practice, David Kohn Architects, is based in London and works internationally on arts, education and residential projects.

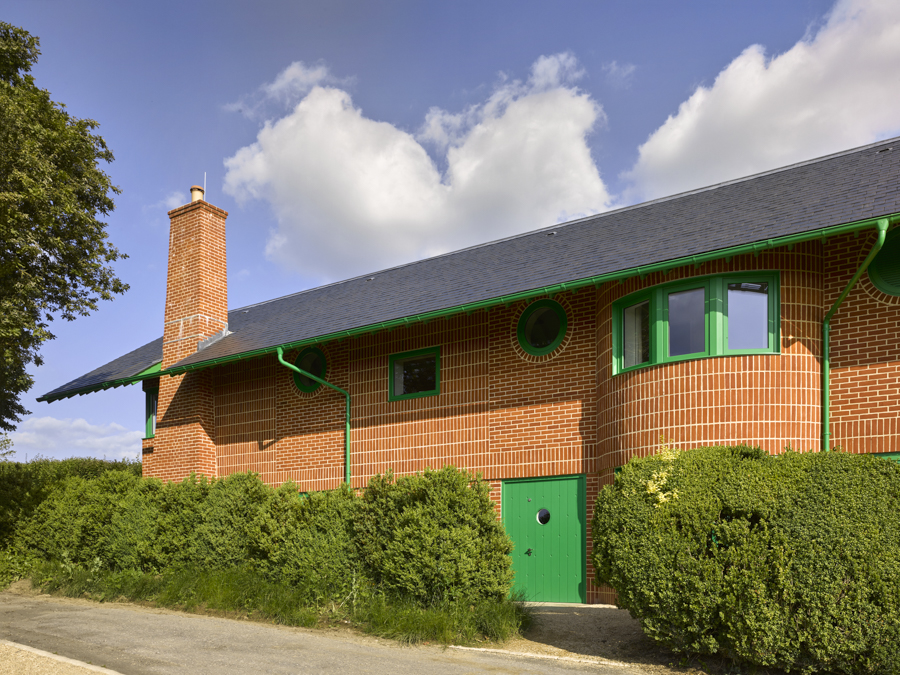
Red House, Dorset by David Kohn Architects. Winner, RIBA House of the Year 2022

Established in 2007, the practice has won a number of awards including Higher Education Architect of the Year Award 2026; the Manser Medal – Architects Journal House of the Year Award – for Cowshed in 2023; and the Royal institute of British Architects House of the Year Award for Red House in 2022. David Kohn was previously named Young Architect of the Year 2009 by Building Design magazine and won INSIDE World Interior of the Year in 2013.

David Kohn Architects completed a redevelopment of Hasselt Beguinage in partnership with Bovenbouw Architectuur to create a new home for Hasselt University's architecture faculty in 2025, a new campus for New College, Oxford, the redevelopment of Modern Art Oxford in 2024, and a new London space for Stephen Friedman Gallery in 2023. Current projects include new market buildings at Birmingham Smithfield, and a major redevelopment of the S.M.A.K. museum in Ghent, Belgium in partnership with noAarchitecten and Asli Çiçek.

As well as a growing number of larger scale projects, the practice continues to push boundaries in residential design. Reviewing Smart's Place, London (2025) for the RIBA Journal, Edwin Heathcote commented "it is one of the most interesting, generous, original and unexpected new dwellings in the capital in recent years ... there is genuinely no one else doing anything even vaguely similar." David Kohn Architects has also designed a studio and archive building in Brighton for artist David Shrigley.

Kohn was born in Cape Town and studied architecture at the University of Cambridge and at Columbia University GSAPP, New York, as a Fulbright Scholar. He taught architecture at the Architectural Association School of Architecture between 2019 and 2024, at the Sir John Cass School of Art, Architecture and Design between 2003 and 2013, and was a visiting professor at KU Leuven between 2014 and 2016. He will be the 2027 Robert A.M. Stern Visiting Professor in Classical Architecture at Yale University.

Kohn is a Fellow of the Royal Society of Arts.

== Education ==
- 1997 MA and Diploma in Architecture, Jesus College, Cambridge University
- 1994 BA (Hons) Architecture, Jesus College, Cambridge University

== Clients ==
Previous and current clients include the V&A, New College Oxford, University of Hasselt, Lendlease, Modern Art Oxford, Stephen Friedman Gallery and numerous private clients.

== Significant buildings ==
- (2025) House on a Hill, London
- (2025) Hasselt Beguinage, Hasselt, Belgium
- (2015–2024) The Gradel Quadrangles, New College, Oxford
- (2024) Modern Art Oxford
- (2023) Stephen Friedman Gallery, London
- (2023) Exhibition design for Lucie Rie: The Adventure of Pottery at Kettle's Yard, Cambridge
- (2022) Cowshed, Devon
- (2022) Greenwich Design District, London
- (2020) Red House, Dorset
- (2017–2018) V&A Photography Centre, London
- (2012–2020) Institute of Contemporary Arts, London
- (2014) Sotheby's S|2, London
- (2012) A Room for London, Living Architecture
- (2012) The White Building, Hackney Wick, London
- (2012) Carrer Avinyó, Barcelona
- (2011) Thomas Dane Gallery, Mayfair, London
- (2010) Skyroom, London
- (2009) Stable Acre, Norfolk
- (2008) Flash at the Royal Academy of Arts, London

== In progress ==
- Smithfield Markets, Birmingham
- David Shrigley studio and archive, Brighton
- S.M.A.K Museum, Ghent

== Books ==
Stages – the first comprehensive monograph of David Kohn Architects' work – was published in 2026. It was described by Creative Review as "painstakingly crafted and looking to subvert notions of what an architecture book can be".
