= List of television programmes broadcast by the BBC =

This is a list of television programmes broadcast by the BBC either currently or previously broadcast on the BBC in the United Kingdom.

== Current programming ==
Programmes in this section have been broadcast by the BBC in the last year or have a commission for further episodes.

Recommissioned shows are shown as running to the present, as are any show that is currently airing.

Only channels where an episode first aired are listed (with the exception of episodes on non-BBC Three programmes which debuted online; for these) the linear channel and the transmission date on that channel are used.

Children's television programmes can be found at List of BBC children's television programmes.

=== Drama ===
Title	Channel	First broadcast	Notes
A Ghost Story for Christmas	One (1971–78); Four (2005–06; 2018–19); Two (2010–13; 2021–present)	24 December 1971 – 25 December 1978	
A Ghost Story for Christmas	One (1971–78); Four (2005–06; 2018–19); Two (2010–13; 2021–present)	23 December 2005 – present (revival)	
Silent Witness	One	21 February 1996 – present	
Waterloo Road	One (2006–14; 2023–present); Three (2015)	9 March 2006 – 9 March 2015	
Waterloo Road	One (2006–14; 2023–present); Three (2015)	3 January 2023 – present (revival)	
Death in Paradise	One	25 October 2011 – present	
Call the Midwife	One	15 January 2012 – present	
Line of Duty	Two (2012–16); One (2017–present)	26 June 2012 – present	
Father Brown	One	14 January 2013 – present	
Shetland	One	10 March 2013 – present	
Doctor Foster	One	9 September 2015 – present	
The Night Manager	One	21 February 2016 – present	Co-production with AMC (series 1) and Amazon Prime Video (series 2–present)
Strike	One	27 August 2017 – present	Co-production with Cinemax (series 1–4) and HBO (series 5–present)
Shakespeare & Hathaway: Private Investigators	One	26 February 2018 – present	Co-production with Alibi (series 5)
London Kills	One	24 June 2019 – present	Co-production with Acorn TV
The Capture	One	3 September 2019 – present	
Industry	Two	10 November 2020 – present	Co-production with HBO
Vigil	One	29 August 2021 – present	
Hope Street	Northern Ireland	24 November 2021 – present	
Sherwood	One	13 June 2022 – present	
SAS: Rogue Heroes	One	30 October 2022 – present	Co-production with Epix (series 1) and MGM+ (series 2–present)
Granite Harbour	Scotland	1 December 2022 – present	
Beyond Paradise	One	24 February 2023 – present	Co-production with BritBox
Blue Lights	One	27 March 2023 – present	
Black Snow	Four	28 September 2023 – present	Acquired from Stan
Interview with the Vampire	Two	12 October 2023 – present	Acquired from AMC
Scrublands	Four	18 November 2023 – present	Acquired from Stan
Mayfair Witches	Two	6 December 2023 – present	Acquired from AMC
Rebus	One	17 May 2024 – present	
A Good Girl's Guide to Murder	Three	1 July 2024 – present	Co-production with Netflix
High Country	One	13 July 2024 – present	Acquired from Showcase
Nightsleeper	One	15 September 2024 – present	
Ludwig	One	25 September 2024 – present	
Return to Paradise	One	22 November 2024 – present	Co-production with ABC
The One That Got Away	Wales	25 February 2025 – present	
This City Is Ours	One	23 March 2025 – present	
Riot Women	One	12 October 2025 – present	
The Ridge	Scotland	21 October 2025	
Wild Cherry	One	15 November 2025	
Lynley	One	5 January 2026 – present	Co-production with BritBox
The Walsh Sisters	One	21 February 2026 – present	Acquired from RTÉ One
The Other Bennet Sister	One	15 March 2026 – present	
Crookhaven	One	22 March 2026 – present	
Mint	One	20 April 2026	
I, Jack Wright	One	12 July 2026 – present	Acquired from U&Alibi
The Hairdresser Mysteries	One	17 July 2026	
The Split Up	One	20 September 2026 – present	
The Northumbria Mysteries	One	23 October 2026	
Honey	One	14 November 2026	Co-production with ZDF
The Witch Farm	One	22 November 2026	

=== Comedy ===
Title	Channel	First Broadcast	Notes
Not Going Out	One	6 October 2006 – present	
Mrs. Brown's Boys	One	21 February 2011 – present	Co-production with RTÉ One
Two Doors Down	Scotland (2013); Two (2016–22); One (2022–25)	31 December 2013 (pilot); 1 April 2016 – present	
The Young Offenders	Three (2018–20); One (2024–present)	1 February 2018 – present	Co-production with RTÉ2 (series 1–2) and RTÉ One (series 3–present)
Mandy	Two	25 July 2019 (pilot); 13 August 2020 – present	
Here We Go	One	30 December 2020 (pilot); 29 April 2022 – present	
The Cleaner	One	10 September 2021 – present	
Mammoth	Wales (2021); Two (2024–present)	5 November 2021 (pilot); 17 April 2024 – present	
Ellie & Natasia	Three (2022); Two (2026)	21 June 2022 – present	
Am I Being Unreasonable?	One	23 September 2022 – present	
Ghosts (US)	Three	20 November 2022 – present	Acquired from CBS
Black Ops	One	5 May 2023 – present	
Funboys	Northern Ireland	14 June 2023 (pilot); 10 February 2025 – present	
Such Brave Girls	Three	22 November 2023 – present	
Things You Should Have Done	Three	29 February 2024 – present	
Dinosaur	Scotland	21 April 2024 – present	Co-production with Hulu
Daddy Issues	Three	15 August 2024 – present	
We Might Regret This	Two	19 August 2024 – present	
Smoggie Queens	Three	28 November 2024 – present	
Amandaland	One	5 February 2025 – present	
Austin	One	4 April 2025 – present	Acquired from ABC
Death Valley	Wales	25 May 2025 – present	
St. Denis Medical	One	6 June 2025 – present	Acquired from NBC
Trying	One	8 September 2025 – present	Acquired from Apple TV
Twisted Metal	One	4 October 2025 – present	Acquired from Peacock
Leonard and Hungry Paul	Three	17 October 2025	Co-production with RTÉ One
Can You Keep a Secret?	One	7 January 2026 – present	Co-production with Paramount+
Small Prophets	Two	9 February 2026 – present	
Ann Droid	One	17 July 2026 – present	
He Had It Coming	Three	8 August 2026	Acquired from Stan
The Reluctant Vampire	One	4 October 2026	

=== Soap ===
Title	Channel	First Broadcast
EastEnders	One	19 February 1985 – present
Casualty	One	6 September 1986 – present

=== Unscripted ===
==== Documentaries ====
Title	Channel	First Broadcast
Panorama	One	11 November 1953 – present
Horizon	Two	2 May 1964 – present
Arena	Two & Four	1 October 1975 – present
This World	Two & World News	4 January 2004 – present
Great British Railway Journeys	Two & Four	4 January 2010 – present
Ambulance	One	27 September 2016 – present
Awaiting release
Blue Planet III	One	2026

==== Gameshows ====
Title	Channel	First Broadcast
Bargain Hunt	One	13 March 2000 – present
The Weakest Link	Two	14 August 2000 – 8 February 2008; 5 September 2011 – 30 March 2012; 17 November 2017
The Weakest Link	One	31 October 2000 – 31 March 2012; 18 December 2021 – present
Pointless	Two	24 August 2009 – 26 August 2011
Pointless	One	29 August 2011 – present
The Hit List	One	25 May 2019 – present
Bridge of Lies	One	14 March 2022 – present
The Finish Line	One	21 August 2023 – present

==== Reality ====
Title	Channel	First Broadcast	Notes
The Sky at Night	One	24 April 1957 – 7 January 2013	
The Sky at Night	Four	2014	
Blue Peter	One	16 October 1958 – 2012	
Points of View	One	2 October 1961 – present	
Songs of Praise	One	1 October 1961 – present	
Top of the Pops	One	1 January 1964 – 11 July 2005	
Top of the Pops	One	24 December 1964 – 31 December 2021 (Christmas specials)	
Top of the Pops	Two	17 July 2005 – 30 July 2006	
Top of the Pops	Two	24 December 2022 – present (Christmas specials)	
Match of the Day	Two	22 August 1964 – 1966	
Match of the Day	One	1966 – present	
Gardeners' World	Two	5 January 1968 – present	
Question of Sport	One	2 December 1968 (pilot)	
Question of Sport	One	5 January 1970 – 8 September 2023	
Mastermind	One	11 September 1972 – 1 September 1997	
Mastermind	Discovery	2001 – 2002	
Mastermind	Two	7 July 2003 – present	
Football Focus	One	1974	
Top Gear	Two (2002–2020); One (2020–present)	20 October 2002 – present	Part of the Top Gear franchise
Antiques Roadshow	One	18 February 1979 – present	
See Hear	Two	11 October 1981 – present	
Countryfile	One	24 July 1988 – present	
MasterChef	One	2 July 1990 – 3 July 2001; 21 February 2005 – present	
MasterChef	Two		
Have I Got News for You	One / Two	28 September 1990 – present	
Later... with Jools Holland	Two	8 October 1992 – present	
The National Lottery	One	1994 – 2017 (short clip of draw results after BBC news); 2016 –	
Room 101	Two	4 July 1994 – 9 February 2007	
Room 101	One	20 January 2012 – 6 April 2018	
University Challenge	ITV	21 September 1962 – 31 December 1987	
University Challenge	Two	21 September 1994 – present	
DIY SOS	One	7 October 1999 – present	
Saturday Kitchen	Two	26 January 2002 – January 2006	
Saturday Kitchen	One	January 2006 – present	
The National Lottery: In It to Win It	One	18 May 2002 – 16 July 2016	
Escape to the Country	One	2002	Daytime programming
Escape to the Country	Two	2002 – 2012	
QI	Four	11 September 2003 – 2008	
QI	Two	18 September 2003 – present	
QI	One	26 November 2009 – present	
Homes Under the Hammer	One	17 November 2003 – present	Daytime programming
Celebrity Mastermind	One	30 December 2002 – present	
Live at the Apollo	One	6 September 2004 – 2 January 2015	
Live at the Apollo	Two	9 November 2015 – present	
Match of the Day 2	Two	15 August 2004 – 18 May 2025	
Match of the Day 2	One	2012 – present	
Strictly Come Dancing	One	15 May 2004 – present	
Strictly Come Dancing: It Takes Two	Two	25 October 2004 – present	
Who Do You Think You Are?	Two	12 October 2004 – 15 February 2006	
Who Do You Think You Are?	One	6 September 2006 – present	
Dragons' Den	Two	4 January 2005 – 12 April 2020	
Dragons' Den	One	1 April 2021 – present	
Mock the Week	Two	5 June 2005 – 4 November 2022	
Springwatch	Two	30 May 2005 – present	
The Apprentice	Two	16 February 2005 – 10 May 2006	
The Apprentice	One	28 March 2007 – present	
The Apprentice: You're Fired!	Three	22 February – 10 May 2006	
The Apprentice: You're Fired!	Two	28 March 2007 – 23 March 2023	
Celebrity MasterChef	One	2006 – 2011	
Celebrity MasterChef	Two	2012	
The One Show	One	14 August 2006 – present	
The Graham Norton Show	Two	22 February 2007 – 28 May 2009	
The Graham Norton Show	One	5th October 2009 – present	
Would I Lie to You?	One	16 June 2007 – present	
The Big Questions	One	9 September 2007	
Helicopter Heroes	One	3 September 2007 – 2 February 2015	Daytime programming
Who Dares Wins	One	17 November 2007 – 7 September 2019	
Only Connect	Four	15 September 2008 – 7 July 2014	
Only Connect	Two	1 September 2014 – present	
The Sheriffs Are Coming	One	19 March 2012 – present	Daytime programming
The Great British Sewing Bee	Two	2 April 2013 – 2 April 2019	
The Great British Sewing Bee	One	22 April 2020 – 26 July 2023	
The Great Interior Design Challenge	Two	20 January 2014 – 19 January 2017	
The Great Pottery Throw Down	Two	3 November 2015 – 23 March 2017	
Michael McIntyre's Big Show	One	25 December 2015 – present	
The Big Painting Challenge	Two	22 February 2015 – 29 March 2016	
The Big Painting Challenge	One	12 February 2017 –	
Insert Name Here	Two	4 January 2016	
The NFL Show	One	13 September 2016	
NFL This Week	Two	13 September 2016	
Sounds Like Friday Night	One	27 October 2017	
The Greatest Dancer	One	5 January 2019	
Race Across the World	One	3 March 2019 – present	
Glow Up: Britain's Next Make-Up Star	Three	6 March 2019	
Interior Design Masters	Two	14 August 2019	
RuPaul's Drag Race UK	Three	3 October 2019	
Little Mix: The Search	One	26 September 2020 – 7 November 2020	
Pooch Perfect	One	7 January 2021 – 4 March 2021	
Celebrity Best Home Cook	One	26 January 2021 – 17 February 2021	
This is MY House	One	24 March 2021 – 29 April 2021	
All That Glitters	Two	13 April 2021 –	
Crouchy's Year-Late Euros: Live	One	11 June 2021 – 11 July 2021	
The Traitors	One	29 November 2022 – present	
Celebrity Race Across The World	One	20 September 2023 – present	
The Traitors US	One	25 January 2023 – present	Acquired from Peacock
The Claudia Winkleman Show	One	13 March 2026 – 24 April 2026	

== News programming ==
For programmes which only air on the BBC World News Channel, see programming on BBC World News.

Title	Channel	First Broadcast	Notes
BBC News	One	5 July 1954 – present	
Question Time	One	25 September 1979 – present	
Newsnight	Two	28 January 1980 – present	
BBC News at Six	One	3 September 1984 – present	
BBC News at One	One	27 October 1986 – present	
BBC World News	One, Two & News Channel	16 January 1995 – present	
World Business Report	One, Two & News Channel	1995 – present	
BBC Breakfast	One, Two & News Channel	2 October 2000 – present	
BBC News at Ten	One	16 October 2000 – present	
This Week	News Channel	16 January 2003 – 18 July 2019	
Daily Politics	Two, One & News Channel	8 January 2003 – 24 July 2018	
Sportday/Sport Today	One, Two, World News & News Channel	2003 – present	Branded as either Sportday or Sport Today depending on simulcasting.
This World	Two	2004 – present	
The Andrew Marr Show	One	11 September 2005 – 19 December 2021	Titled as Sunday AM 2005–2007.
BBC News at Five	News Channel	3 April 2006 – 13 March 2020	
World News Today	Four, News Channel and World News	31 May 2006 – 20 March 2020	Titled as World News Today with George Alagiah (2006–2010) and World News Today with Zeinab Badawi (2007–2014).
Newsday	One, News Channel & World News	13 June 2011 – present	
Victoria Derbyshire	Two & News Channel	7 April 2015 – 17 March 2020	
BBC Newsroom Live	Two & News Channel	21 March 2016 – 2020	
GMT	Two & World News	1 February 2010 – 1 November 2019	
BBC News at Nine	News Channel	18 March 2013 – 31 March 2015	
BBC News at Nine	Two	5 November 2018 – 16 April 2023	
BBC News at Nine	One	21 March – 4 September 2020	
The Context	Four, News Channel & World News	23 January 2017 – present	Titled as: 100 Days until May 2017, 100 Days + until July 2017 and Beyond 100 Days until March 2020.
Afternoon Live	News Channel	9 October 2017	
The Briefing	One, News Channel & World News	30 October 2017	
Morning Live	One	26 October 2020 – present	
Context with Christian Fraser	News Channel & World News	5 January 2022	
The Catch Up	Three	1 February 2022 – present	
Sunday with Laura Kuenssberg	One & News Channel	4 September 2022 – present	

== Sports programmes ==
- FA Cup: BBC One/TV 1937 – 1996, 2002 – 2008 & 2014 – present (shared with BT Sport, and currently with ITV Sport)
- Wimbledon Championships: BBC TV/BBC One 1937 – present, BBC Two 1964 – present
- The Boat Race: BBC TV/One 1938 – 2004 & 2010 – present (ITV covered the Boat Race from 2005 – 2009)
- Rugby League Challenge Cup: BBC One & Two 1948 – present
- Summer & Winter Olympic Games: BBC One & Two 1948 – present
- The Open Championship: BBC One & Two 1955 – present (live coverage 1955 – 2015, highlights 2016 – present)
- Test Match Special: BBC Radio 1957 – present
- Final Score: BBC One 1958 – present (part of Grandstand 1958 – 2001)
- The Grand National: BBC One 1960 – 2012, BBC Radio 1948 – present (rights transferred to Channel 4)
- Rugby League World Cup: BBC One & Two 1960 – present (live coverage 1960 – 2000 & 2013 – present, highlights only 2008)
- UEFA European Championship: BBC One 1960 – present (shared with ITV Sport)
- FIFA World Cup: BBC One 1962 – present (shared with ITV Sport)
- Match of the Day: BBC Two 1964 – 1966, BBC One 1966 – present (Only on air for FA Cup weekends 1988 – 1992 & 2001 – 2004)
- Rugby Special: BBC Two 1966 – 2005 & 2016 – present
- Football Focus: BBC One 1974 – present (part of Grandstand 1974 – 2001)
- World Snooker Championship: BBC One & BBC Two 1977 – present
- Ski Sunday: BBC Two 1978 – present
- London Marathon: BBC One 1981 – present
- Great North Run: BBC One 1981 – present
- Today at Wimbledon: BBC Two 1993 – 2014 & 2016 – present (replaced by Wimbledon 2Day in 2015)
- 6 Nations Rugby: BBC One 2000 – present (shared with ITV Sport 2016 – present)
- Match of the Day 2: BBC Two 2004 – 2012, BBC One 2012 – present
- FIFA Club World Cup: 2005, 2012, 2019 – present
- FIFA Women's World Cup – BBC One/Two 2007 – present
- ATP World Tour Finals – BBC Two 2009 – present
- PDC Champions League of Darts: BBC One & BBC Two 2016 – present
- The Premier League Show: BBC Two 2016 – present
- England Test Match, ODI & T20 International Highlights: 2020 – present
- 2 England Men's T20 Internationals & 2 England Women's T20 International: 2020 – present
- 10 matches from men's City based T20 competition & 8 matches from women's City based T20 competition: 2020 – present
- UEFA Women's Championship 2022 – present

== Events ==
- Chelsea Flower Show
- Children in Need (BBC One & BBC Two 1980 – present)
- Comic Relief (BBC One & BBC Two 1985 – present)
- Edinburgh Festival
- Eurovision Song Contest (Finals: BBC TV/BBC One 1956 – present, Semi-finals: BBC Three 2004 – 2015; 2022, BBC Four 2016 – 2021, BBC One 2023–present)
- Glastonbury Festival (BBC Two 1997 – present, BBC Three 2003 – 2015, BBC Four 2003 – present)
- Junior Eurovision Song Contest (BBC One 2022–present)
- The Proms
- Sport Relief (BBC One & BBC Two 2002–2020)

== Former programming ==
=== 0–9 ===
Title	Channel	First Broadcast	Last Broadcast	Notes
1 vs. 100	One	30 September 2006	23 May 2009	
10 Days to War	Two	10 March 2008	19 March 2008	
100 Greatest Britons	One	20 October 2002		
101 Ways to Leave a Gameshow	One	10 July 2010	28 August 2010	
199 Park Lane	One	3 August 1965	1 October 1965	
1990	Two	18 September 1977	10 April 1978	
2000 Today	One	31 December 1999	1 January 2000	
20th Century Battlefields	Two	4 June 2007	23 July 2007	
24	Two	2003	2004	
2point4 Children	One	3 September 1991	30 December 1999	
3 Non-Blondes	Three	9 February 2003	21 December 2003	
3rd Rock from the Sun	Two	24 October 1996	2002	
5-Star Family Reunion	One	25 July 2015	15 October 2016	
50/50	One	7 April 1997	12 July 2005	
55 Degrees North	One	6 July 2004	10 July 2005	
60 Seconds	Choice (2001–03); Three (2003–16)	16 July 2001	16 February 2016	
The 7 O'Clock News	Three	10 February 2003	2 December 2005	
The 70s	Two	16 April 2012	7 May 2012	
The 8:15 from Manchester	One	21 April 1990	14 September 1991	
9/11: Inside the President's War Room	One	1 September 2021		Co-production with Apple TV+
999	One	25 June 1992	17 September 2003	

=== A ===
Title	Channel	First Broadcast	Last Broadcast	Notes
A Dangerous Kind of Love	Two	30 June 1986		
A for Andromeda (1961)	One	3 October 1961	14 November 1961	
A for Andromeda (2006)	Four	27 March 2006		
A Poet in New York	Two	2014		
The A to Z of TV Gardening	Two	6 January 2013	30 June 2013	
The A Word	One	22 March 2016	9 June 2020	
The ABC Murders	One	26 December 2018	28 December 2018	
Absolute Power	Two	10 November 2003	25 August 2005	
Absolutely Fabulous	One	12 November 1992; 31 August 2001; 25 December 2011	7 November 1996; 25 December 2004; 23 July 2012	
Accidents Can Happen	One	2004	2006	
Accused (1996)	One	3 November 1996	23 December 1996	
Accused (2010)	One	15 November 2010	4 September 2012	
Adam Adamant Lives!	One	23 June 1966	25 March 1967	
The Admirable Crichton	BBC TV	11 June 1950	15 June 1950	
Ads Infinitum	Two	19 December 1996	30 October 2000	
The Adventure Game	One (1980); Two (1981–86)	24 May 1980	18 February 1986	
The Adventures of Alice	One	23 December 1960		
Adventure Story (1950)	BBC TV	1950		
Adventure Story (1961)	BBC TV	12 June 1961		
Afghanistan: The Great Game – A Personal View by Rory Stewart	One	28 May 2012	30 May 2012	
Africa	One	2 January 2013	6 February 2013	
After You've Gone	One	12 January 2007	21 December 2008	
Against the Law	Two	2017		
Age Before Beauty	One	31 July 2018	29 August 2018	
An Age of Kings	One	28 April 1960	17 November 1960	
Alan Davies Après-Ski	Two	7 February 2014	21 February 2014	
Alaska: Earth's Frozen Kingdom	Two	2015		
Alice in Wonderland (1966)	One	28 December 1966		
All About Me	One	8 March 2002	29 October 2004	
All Along the Watchtower	One	28 February 1999	11 April 1999	
All Quiet on the Preston Front	One	4 January 1994	8 September 1997	
All Round to Mrs. Brown's	One	25 March 2017	25 April 2020	
All the Small Things	One	31 March 2009	5 May 2009	
'Allo 'Allo!	One	30 December 1982	14 December 1992	
Alma's Not Normal	Two	7 April 2020 (pilot); 13 September 2021	11 November 2024	
The Amazing Mrs Pritchard	One	3 October 2006	7 November 2006	
Amazon Abyss	One	4 April 2005	8 April 2005	
The Ambassador	One	4 January 1998	23 May 1999	
Ambassadors	Two	23 October 2013	6 November 2013	
Amber	Four	2014		
American Dad!	Two (2005–06); Three (2007–16)	22 October 2005		Acquired from Fox
American Crime Story	Two	15 February 2016	21 December 2021	Acquired from FX
The American Future: A History	Two	10 October 2008	31 October 2008	
An Adventure in Space and Time	Two	21 November 2013	23 November 2023	
And Then There Were None	One	26 December 2015	28 December 2015	
Andrina	One	30 November 1981		
The Andromeda Breakthrough	One	28 June 1962	2 August 1962	Sequel to A for Andromeda (1961)
Angel Pavement (1957)	One	27 December 1957	17 January 1958	
Angel Pavement (1967)	One	19 August 1967	9 September 1967	
Angels	One	1 September 1975	22 December 1983	
Andes to Amazon	Two	6 November 2000	18 December 2000	
Andrew Marr's History of Modern Britain	Two	22 May 2007	19 June 2007	
Andrew Marr's History of the World	One	23 September 2012	11 November 2012	
Animal Antics	One	2012		
Animal Babies	One	2016		
Animal Hospital	One	29 August 1994	13 September 2004	
Animals with Cameras	One	2018		
Annika	One	20 May 2023	7 June 2023	Acquired from Alibi
Ann Veronica	Two	23 May 1964	13 June 1964	
Anna of the Five Towns	Two	9 January 1985	30 January 1985	
Anthea Turner: Perfect Housewife	Three	9 February 2006	25 July 2007	
Anthony	One	27 July 2020		
Any Dream Will Do	One	31 March 2007	9 June 2007	
A Perfect Planet	One	3 January 2021	31 January 2021	
The Aphrodite Inheritance	One	3 January 1979	21 February 1979	
Apparitions	One	13 November 2008	18 December 2008	
Apple Tree Yard	One	22 January 2017	6 February 2017	
Appointment with Drama	One	15 July 1955	12 August 1955	
Archangel	One	19 March 2005	20 March 2005	
Are You Being Served?	One	8 September 1972	1 April 1985	
Are You an Egghead?	Two	20 October 2008	23 November 2009	
Are You Fitter Than a Pensioner?	Three	23 September 2010	31 October 2010	
Aristocrats	One	20 June 1999	25 July 1999	
The Ark	One	30 March 2015		
Around the World in 80 Days	One	26 December 2021	30 January 2022	Co-production with France 2, PBS, RAI and ZDF
Around the World in 80 Treasures	Two	21 February 2005	18 April 2005	
Armadillo	One	16 September 2001	30 September 2001	
Artemis 81	One	29 December 1981		
As I Was Saying	One	10 September 1955	15 October 1955	
As Seen on TV	One	17 July 2009	3 September 2009	
As Time Goes By	One	12 January 1992	30 December 2005	
The Ascent of Man	Two	5 May 1973		
Ashes to Ashes	One	7 February 2008	21 May 2010	Sequel to Life on Mars
Asia	One	3 November 2024	15 December 2024	
Ask Rhod Gilbert	One	27 September 2010	9 November 2011	
Asylum	Four	9 February 2015	23 February 2015	
Atlantic: The Wildest Ocean on Earth	Two	30 July 2015	13 August 2015	
Atlantis	One	28 September 2013	16 May 2015	
Attenborough: 60 Years in the Wild	Two	16 November 2012	30 November 2012	
Auf Wiedersehen, Pet	One	28 April 2002	8 February 2004	
Avoidance	One	10 June 2022	2 May 2024	
Awkwafina Is Nora from Queens	Three	2 October 2020	19 July 2023	Acquired from Comedy Central

=== B ===
Title	Channel	First Broadcast	Last Broadcast	Notes
Babs	One	7 May 2017		
The Baby Borrowers	Three	8 January 2007	19 January 2007	
Babyfather	Two	1 October 2001	18 December 2002	
Back to Life	Three (2019); One (2021)	15 April 2019	31 August 2021	Co-production with Showtime
Back to the Floor	Two	28 October 1997	19 April 2002	
Backchat	Three (2013); Two (2013–15)	20 November 2013	26 December 2015	
Backup	One	7 September 1995	2 July 1997	
Bad Education	Three	14 August 2012; 15 December 2022	21 October 2014; 28 January 2024 (revival)	
Badults	Three	23 July 2013	7 July 2014	
Bake Off: Crème de la Crème	Two	29 March 2016	31 May 2017	
Baker Boys	Wales	23 January 2011	8 December 2011	
The Baker Street Boys	One	8 March 1983	1 April 1983	
Ballet Shoes (1975)	One	5 October 1975	9 November 1975	
Ballet Shoes (2007)	One	26 December 2007		
Ballykissangel	One	11 February 1996	15 April 2001	
Band of Brothers	Two	2001		Acquired from HBO
Bang, Bang, It's Reeves and Mortimer	Two	1 January 1999	5 February 1999	
Bang Goes the Theory	One	27 July 2009	5 May 2014	
Banished	Two	5 March 2015	16 April 2015	
Baptiste	One	17 February 2019	22 August 2021	
The Barbara Vine Mysteries	One	10 May 1992	3 January 1994	
The Barchester Chronicles	One	10 November 1982	22 December 1982	
Barnaby Rudge	One	30 September 1960	23 December 1960	
Bat Out of Hell	Two	26 November 1966	24 December 1966	
Battlestar Galactica	Two	10 September 1987	3 March 1988	Acquired from ABC
BBC Nine O'Clock News	One	14 September 1970	13 October 2000	
BBC Sunday-Night Play	One	1960	1963	
BBC Television Shakespeare	Two	3 December 1978	27 April 1985	
BBC2 Playhouse	Two	13 March 1974	20 May 1983	
The Bear Family & Me	Two	3 January 2011	5 January 2011	
Beat the Brain	Two	11 May 2015	19 June 2015	
Beau Brummell: This Charming Man	Four	20 December 2006		
Beau Geste	One	31 October 1982	19 December 1982	
Beautiful People	Two	2 October 2008	18 December 2009	
Beck	One	2 October 1996	1 November 1996	
Becoming Human	Three	26 January 2011	20 March 2011	
Being Human	Three	18 February 2008	10 March 2013	
Bel Ami	Two	8 May 1971	5 June 1971	
Bella and the Boys	Two	2004		
Bellamy's People	Two	21 January 2010	11 March 2010	
Belonging	Wales	1999	16 April 2009	
Berkeley Square	One	10 May 1998	19 July 1998	
Better	One	13 February 2023	13 March 2023	
Better Things	Two	2019	2022	
Between the Lines	One	4 September 1992	21 December 1994	
The Big Allotment Challenge	Two	15 April 2014	17 February 2015	
Big Break	One	30 April 1991	9 October 2002	
Big Cats	One	2018		
Big Deal	One	14 October 1984	4 November 1986	
Big Guns	One	1 January 1958	5 February 1958	
Big School	One	16 August 2013	10 October 2014	
Big Ticket	One	28 March 1998	11 July 1998	
The Big Trip Travel Show	Two	1994	1995	
The Bigger Picture with Graham Norton	One	1 August 2005	20 November 2006	
Bill Oddie Back in the USA	Two	11 January 2007	13 February 2007	
The Billion Dollar Chicken Shop	One	18 March 2015		
Bird of Prey	One	22 April 1982	27 September 1984	
Birds of a Feather	One	16 October 1989	24 December 1998	
Birdsong	One	22 January 2012	29 January 2012	
Bizarre Animal ER	Three	14 February 2008	30 May 2011	
Bizarre ER	Three	14 February 2008	16 May 2017	
The Black and White Minstrel Show	One	14 June 1958	21 July 1978	
Black Earth Rising	Two	10 September 2018	29 October 2018	
Black Narcissus	One	27 December 2020	29 December 2020	
Blackadder	One	15 June 1983	2 November 1989	
Blackpool	One	11 November 2004	10 June 2006	
Blackshore	Four	17 January 2026	31 January 2026	Acquired from RTÉ
Blake's 7	One	2 January 1978	21 December 1981	
Blandings	One	13 January 2013	30 March 2014	
Blankety Blank	One	18 January 1979; 26 December 1997	12 March 1990; 28 December 1999	
Bleak House (1959)	One	16 October 1959	25 December 1959	
Bleak House (1985)	Two	10 April 1985	29 May 1985	
Bleak House (2005)	One	27 October 2005	16 December 2005	
The Bleak Old Shop of Stuff	Two	19 December 2011	5 March 2012	
Blessed	One	14 October 2005	9 December 2005	
Bloodlands	One	21 February 2021	23 October 2022	Co-production with Acorn TV
Blood Rights	Two	24 October 1990	7 November 1990	
Blott on the Landscape	Two	6 February 1985	13 March 1985	
The Blue Planet	One	12 September 2001	31 October 2001	
Blue Planet II	One	29 October 2017	10 December 2017	
Bluestone 42	Three	5 March 2013	13 April 2015	
Boarders	Three	20 February 2024	29 March 2026	Co-production with Tubi (series 2–3)
Boats that Built Britain	Four	4 May 2010	19 May 2010	
Bob's Full House	One	1 September 1984	27 January 1990	
Bodies	Three	23 June 2004	13 December 2006	
Bodyguard	One	26 August 2018	23 September 2018	
The Body Farm	One	13 September 2011	18 October 2011	
The Book Quiz	Four	17 July 2007	5 May 2008	
Bonekickers	One	8 July 2008	12 August 2008	
Boomers	One	15 August 2014	29 April 2016	
The Borderers	Two	31 December 1968	31 March 1970	
Bottom	Two	17 September 1991	10 April 1995	
The Boys from Baghdad High	Two	8 January 2008		
Boy Meets Girl	Two	3 September 2015	4 August 2016	
Boys from the Blackstuff	Two	10 October 1982	7 November 1982	
The Boy with the Topknot	Two	8 November 2017		
The Break	Three	27 March 2021	15 July 2023	
Breakaway	Two	12 March 2012	2 November 2012	
Brian Pern	Four	10 February 2014	29 March 2017	
The Bristol Entertainment	Two	3 December 1971		
Britain and the Sea	One	17 November 2013	8 December 2013	
Britain from Above	Two	10 August 2008	24 August 2008	
Britain Unzipped	Three	24 April 2012	21 November 2012	
Britain's Great War	One	27 January 2014	17 February 2014	
Britain's Lost Routes with Griff Rhys Jones	One	31 May 2012	21 June 2012	
Britain's Missing Top Model	Three	1 July 2008	30 July 2008	
The British at Work	Two	11 March 2011	1 April 2011	
The Brits Who Built the Modern World	Four	13 February 2014	27 February 2014	
The Brittas Empire	One	3 January 1991	24 February 1997	
Broken	One	23 May 2017	4 July 2017	
The Bubble	Two	19 February 2010	26 March 2010	
Buccaneer	One	27 April 1980	20 July 1980	
The Buccaneers	One	5 February 1995	5 March 1995	
Bucket	Four	13 April 2017	4 May 2017	
The Buddha of Suburbia	Two	3 November 1993	24 November 1993	
Bugs	One	1 April 1995	28 August 1999	
Bump	One	20 October 2021	15 December 2025	Acquired from Stan
Bumps	One	21 February 2020		
Buried with Michael Sheen	Two	17 August 2026	24 August 2026	
Burn Up	Two	23 July 2008	25 July 2008	
By Any Means	Two	4 June 2008	23 December 2011	
By Any Means	One	22 September 2013	27 October 2013	
By the Sword Divided	One	16 October 1983	10 March 1985	

=== C ===
Title	Channel	First Broadcast	Last Broadcast	Notes
The C-Word	One	2015		
Café Continental	BBC TV	1947	1953	
Le Café des Rêves	Two	26 October 1992	10 February 2000	
Cagney & Lacey	One	29 March 1982	21 May 2006	Acquired from CBS
Call My Bluff	Two (1965–94); One (1996–2005)	17 October 1965	17 July 2005	
Cambridge Spies	One	9 May 2003	30 May 2003	
Candida	One	29 December 1961		
Candy Cabs	One	5 April 2011	19 April 2011	
Canned Carrott	One	3 October 1990	26 August 1995	
Canterbury Tales	One	11 September 2003	16 October 2003	
Can't Touch This	One	26 March 2016	8 October 2016	
Captain Scarlet and the Mysterons	Two	1 October 1993	2 January 2008	Acquired from ITV
Carrie & Barry	One	3 September 2004	3 December 2005	
Carrott Confidential	One	3 January 1987	26 August 1989	
Carrott's Lib	One	2 October 1982	30 December 1983	
Casanova (1971)	Two	16 November 1971	21 December 1971	
Casanova (2005)	Three	13 March 2005	27 March 2005	
The Case	One	31 October 2011	4 November 2011	
Case Histories	One	5 June 2011	2 June 2013	
Cash in the Attic	One	4 November 2002	24 May 2012	
Castles	One	31 May 1995	20 August 1995	
The Casual Vacancy	One	15 February 2015	1 March 2015	
Casualty@Holby City	One	26 December 2004	27 December 2005	
Catchpoint	Two	23 March 2019	25 June 2022	
Catchword	One (1985–86); Two (1988–95)	17 May 1985	23 May 1995	
The Catherine Tate Show	Two	16 February 2004	25 December 2007	
Cats	Two	November 1991	13 December 1991	
The Cazalets	One	22 June 2001	27 July 2001	
CCTV	Three	2003		
Celebdaq	Three	14 February 2003	2004	
Challenge Anneka	One	8 September 1989	15 October 1995	
Champion	One	1 July 2023	19 August 2023	
Champion the Wonder Horse	BBC TV	15 July 1956		Acquired from CBS
Chandler & Co	One	12 July 1994	1 September 1995	
Changing Rooms	One	4 September 1996	28 December 2004	
Charlie Brooker's Gameswipe	Four	September 2009		
Charlie Brooker's Screenwipe	Four	2 March 2006	16 December 2008	
Charlie Brooker's Weekly Wipe	Two	31 January 2013	29 December 2016	
The Chase	One	16 July 2006	26 August 2007	
Cheaters	One	8 February 2022	3 December 2024	
Chef!	One	28 January 1993	30 December 1996	
The Chem. Lab. Mystery	One	5 January 1963	9 February 1963	
The Chief	Scotland	20 February 2025	21 January 2026	
The Child in Time	One	24 September 2017		
Children of the North	Two	30 October 1991	20 November 1991	
Children's TV on Trial	Four	26 May 2007	31 May 2007	
The Chinese Detective	One	30 April 1981	5 November 1982	
Chinese New Year: The Biggest Celebration on Earth	Two	14 February 2016	16 February 2016	
Chivalry and Betrayal: The Hundred Years' War	Four	11 February 2013	25 February 2013	
The Choir	Two	4 December 2006	28 December 2015	
Christabel	Two	16 November 1988	7 December 1988	
Cilla	One	30 January 1968	17 April 1976	
Cinderella	One	26 December 1958		
Citizen Khan	One	27 August 2012	23 December 2016	
The City and the City	Two	6 April 2018	27 April 2018	
City Central	One	4 April 1998	19 June 2000	
City in the Sky	Two	5 June 2016; 27 April 2020	19 June 2016; 29 April 2020	
Civilisation	Two	23 February 1969	18 May 1969	
Civilisations	Two	1 March 2018		
Class	Three	22 October 2016	3 December 2016	Part of the Doctor Who franchise
The Cleopatras	Two	19 January 1983	9 March 1983	
Clique	Three	5 March 2017	9 April 2017	
Clocking Off	One	23 January 2000	6 April 2003	
Close to the Enemy	Two	10 November 2016	22 December 2016	
Coast	Two	22 July 2005	13 August 2015	
The Cockfields	Two	22 March 2023	5 March 2025	Acquired from Gold
The Colbys	One	24 January 1986		
Colditz	One	19 October 1972	1 April 1974	
Colin from Accounts	Two	16 April 2023	7 September 2026	Acquired from Foxtel
Collateral	Two	12 February 2018	5 March 2018	
The Collectors	One	1 March 1986	3 May 1986	
Come and Have a Go If You Think You're Smart Enough	One	3 April 2004	25 June 2005	
Come Back Mrs. Noah	One	13 December 1977	14 August 1978	
Come Fly with Me (2000)	Choice	2 October 2000	17 May 2002	
Come Fly with Me (2010)	One	25 December 2010	27 January 2011	
Come Home	One	27 March 2018	10 April 2018	
Come Outside	Two	23 September 1993	18 March 1997	
Comedy Playhouse	One	15 December 1961; 29 April 2014	9 July 1975; 15 September 2017	
Coming of Age	Three	21 May 2007	8 March 2011	
Common As Muck	One	7 September 1994	12 February 1997	
Commonwealth Jazz Club	Two	2 September 1965	6 October 1965	
Congo	Two	30 January 2001	13 February 2001	
Connections	One	17 October 1978	19 December 1978	
The Coroner	One	16 November 2015	2 December 2016	
Count Arthur Strong	Two (2013); One (2015–17)	8 July 2013	14 July 2017	
Coupling	Two (2000–02); Three (2004)	12 May 2000	14 June 2004	
Cowboy Trap	One	7 September 2009	6 July 2013	
Crackerjack!	One	14 September 1957; 17 January 2020	21 December 1984; 5 March 2021	
Cradle to Grave	Two	3 September 2015	15 October 2015	
The Crane Gang	Two	22 September 2013	6 October 2013	
Crazy Fun Park	Three	16 October 2023	20 October 2023	Acquired from ABC
The Creatives	Two	2 October 1998	16 February 2000	
Crime and Punishment	Two	12 February 2002	13 February 2002	
Crime Traveller	One	1 March 1997	19 April 1997	
Crimes of Passion	Four	30 August 2014		
Crimewatch	One	7 June 1984	20 March 2017	
Crims	Three	8 January 2015	12 February 2015	
The Crimson Field	One	6 April 2014	11 May 2014	
Crocodile Shoes	One	10 November 1994	22 December 1994	
Crocodile Shoes II	One	14 November 1996	19 December 1996	
Crongton	Three	24 March 2025	28 March 2025	
Crooked House	Four	22 December 2008	24 December 2008	
Cruise of the Gods	Two	23 December 2002		
The Cry	One	30 September 2018		
Crying Down the Lane	One	8 January 1962	12 February 1962	
Cuckoo	Three	25 September 2012	4 January 2019	
Cuffs	One	28 October 2015	16 December 2015	
Cunk on Britain	Two	3 April 2018	1 May 2018	
Cunk on Christmas	Two	29 December 2016		
Cunk on Earth	Two	20 September 2022	18 October 2022	
Cunk on Life	Two	30 December 2024		
Cunk on Shakespeare	Two	11 May 2016		
The Cut	Two	19 September 2009	18 December 2010	
Cutting It	One	16 April 2002	12 July 2005	

=== D ===
Title	Channel	First Broadcast	Last Broadcast	Notes
Dad	One	25 September 1997	21 December 1999	
Daily Politics	Two	8 January 2003	24 July 2018	
Daktari	One	17 October 1966	6 January 1977	Acquired from CBS
Dallas	One	1979	1991	Acquired from CBS
Dalziel and Pascoe	One	16 March 1996	22 June 2007	
Damilola, Our Loved Boy	One	7 November 2016		
Dancing on the Edge	Two	4 February 2013	10 March 2013	
Daniel Deronda (2002)	One	23 November 2002	7 December 2002	
Dangerfield	One	27 January 1995	19 November 1999	
Dangerous Knowledge	Two	8 August 2007	11 June 2008	
Danny Boy	Two	12 May 2021		
Danny and the Human Zoo	One	31 August 2015		
Danny Dyer's Right Royal Family	One	23 January 2019	12 February 2019	
Dara and Ed's Great Big Adventure	Two	24 March 2015; 10 May 2018	7 April 2015; 25 May 2018	
Dark Hearts	Four	21 October 2023	6 September 2025	Acquired from France Télévisions
The Dark: Nature's Nighttime World	Two	29 July 2012	12 August 2012	
Dark Money	One	8 July 2019	16 July 2019	
The Dark Side of Fame with Piers Morgan	One	8 September 2008	27 October 2008	
The Dark Side of the Moon	One	13 September 1983	18 October 1983	
Dave	Two	10 May 2020	10 October 2021	Acquired from FXX; Only the first two series were broadcast on the BBC. Moved to Disney+
Dave Allen at Peace	Two	2 April 2018		
David Attenborough's 100 Years on Planet Earth	One	8 May 2026		
Davina	One	15 February 2006	12 April 2006	
Dawn French's Girls Who Do Comedy	One	13 August 2006	7 September 2006	
The Day of the Triffids (1981)	One	10 September 1981	15 October 1981	
The Day of the Triffids (2009)	One	28 December 2009	29 December 2009	
The Day Today	Two	19 January 1994	23 February 1994	
The Day the Universe Changed	One	19 March 1985	21 May 1985	
A Day with Dana	Two	1 December 1974	12 January 1975	
Dead Head	Two	15 January 1986	5 February 1986	
Dead of Night	Two	5 November 1972	17 December 1972	
Dead Ringers	Two	15 March 2002	29 March 2007	
The Dead Room	Four	24 December 2018		
Dear Ladies	Two	15 March 1983	16 December 1984	
Death and Nightingales	Two	28 November 2018		
Death Comes to Pemberley	One	26 December 2013	28 December 2013	
The Death of Yugoslavia	One	3 September 1995	6 June 1996	
Death Unexplained	One	7 February 2012	21 February 2012	
Deceit	One	2 April 2000	9 April 2000	
Decidedly Dusty	One	9 September 1969	28 October 1969	
Decline and Fall	One	31 March 2017	14 April 2017	
The Deep	One	3 August 2010	31 August 2010	
Defending the Guilty	Two	19 September 2018	22 October 2019	
Desperate Romantics	Two	21 July 2009	25 August 2009	
Detective	BBC TV	30 March 1964	9 November 1969	
Detectorists	Four (2014–17); Two (2022)	2 October 2014	13 December 2017; 26 December 2022 (special)	
Diagnosis: Murder	One	3 January 1993	24 May 2011	Acquired from CBS
Diana and I	Two	4 September 2017		
The Diary of Anne Frank (1987)	One	4 January 1987	25 January 1987	
The Diary of Anne Frank (2009)	One	5 January 2009	9 January 2009	
The Diary of Samuel Pepys	One	7 March 1958	13 June 1958	
Dickensian	One	26 December 2015	21 February 2016	
Die Kinder	Two	14 November 1990	19 December 1990	
Didn't They Do Well	One	15 January 2004	18 March 2004	
dinnerladies	One	12 November 1998	27 January 2000	
Dirty War	Two	26 September 2004		
Disney Time	One	25 December 1964	31 August 1998	
The Disorderly Room	One	1937	1939	
Dixon of Dock Green	One	9 July 1955	1 May 1976	
Doctor at the Top	One	21 February 1991	4 April 1991	
Doctor Who	One	23 November 1963	6 December 1989	
Doctor Who	One	27 May 1996 (film)		Co-production with Fox
Doctor Who	One	26 March 2005	31 May 2025 (revival)	Co-production with Disney+ (series 14–15)
Doctor Who Confidential	Three	26 March 2005	1 October 2011	Part of the Doctor Who franchise
Doctor Who Extra	iPlayer	23 August 2014	27 December 2017	Part of the Doctor Who franchise
Doctor Who: Thirty Years in the TARDIS	One	29 November 1993		Part of the Doctor Who franchise
Doctor Who: Unleashed	Three	17 November 2023	7 June 2025	Part of the Doctor Who franchise
The Doctors	One	19 November 1969	1971	
Doctors	One	26 March 2000	14 November 2024	
Doing Money	Two	5 November 2018		
Dolphins - Spy in the Pod	One	2 January 2014	9 January 2014	
Dombey and Son (1969)	One	17 August 1969	9 November 1969	
Dombey and Son (1983)	One	16 January 1983	20 March 1983	
Domino Day	Three	31 January	28 February 2024	
Don't Forget the Driver	Two	9 April 2019	14 May 2019	
Don't Scare the Hare	One	23 April 2011	22 October 2011	
Don't Tell the Bride	Three (2007–14); One (2015)	8 November 2007	15 December 2015	
Doomwatch	One	9 February 1970	14 August 1972	
Dope Girls	One	22 February 2025	29 March 2025	
A Dorothy L. Sayers Mystery	Two	25 March 1987	30 May 1987	
Down to Earth	One	28 August 2000	6 March 2005	
Dragons Alive	One	24 March 2004	7 April 2004	
Dreaming Whilst Black	Three	19 April 2021 (pilot); 24 July 2023	16 October 2025	Co-production with Showtime
Dreamspaces	Three	16 February 2003	5 February 2004	
The Driver	One	23 September 2014	7 October 2014	
Dry Your Eyes	Northern Ireland	10 March 2006	2007	
Dublin Murders	One	14 October 2019	5 November 2019	
The Duchess of Duke Street	One	4 September 1976	24 December 1977	
Duckman	Two	6 January 1995	3 October 1997	Acquired from USA Network
Dynasties	One	11 November 2018	9 November 2018	
Dynasties II	One	20 March 2022	10 April 2022	
Dynasty	One	1 May 1982		

=== E ===
Title	Channel	First Broadcast	Last Broadcast	Notes
Earth: The Power of the Planet	Two	20 November 2007	18 December 2007	
Earth's Great Rivers	Two (2019); Northern Ireland (2023)	1 January 2019; 10 April 2023	3 January 2019; 12 April 2023	
Earth's Greatest Spectacles	Two	5 February 2016	19 February 2016	
Earth's Natural Wonders	One (2015–18); Four (2020–23)	5 August 2015; 7 June 2020	7 March 2018; 27 July 2023	
Earth's Seasonal Secrets	One	2016	2017	
Earth's Wildest Waters: The Big Fish	Two	2015		
Earthflight	One	29 December 2011	29 January 2012	
EastEnders: E20	Three	8 January 2010	21 October 2011	
EastEnders Revealed	Choice (1998–2003); Three (2003–11)	1998	1 January 2016	
The Edge	One	16 March 2015	13 November 2015	
Edge of Darkness	Two	4 November 1985	9 December 1985	
Edwardian Farm	Two	10 November 2010	19 January 2011	
Eldorado	One	6 July 1992	9 July 1993	
Electric Dreams	Four	29 September 2009	13 October 2009	
Elizabeth Is Missing	One	8 December 2019		
The Elusive Pimpernel	One	20 April 1969	22 June 1969	
Emma Goes to Bollywood	Two	25 June 2005		
Empire	One	27 February 2012	26 March 2012	
Enterprice	Three	29 November 2018	8 March 2020	
Epic Win	One	20 August 2011	24 September 2011	
Episodes	Two	10 January 2011		
Equator	One (2006); Two (2014)	6 October 2006; 31 August 2014	20 October 2006; 21 September 2014	
Eric, Ernie and Me	Four	29 December 2017		
The Escape Artist	One	29 October 2013	12 November 2013	
The European Union: In or Out	Two	2 April 2014		
Eurovision: Your Country Needs Blue	One	16 April 2011		
Eurovision: Your Country Needs You	One (1957–2010); Two (2016–19)	22 January 1957	8 February 2019	
Everything I Know About Love	One	8 June 2022	21 July 2022	Co-production with Peacock
Excalibur	One	1974	1975	
Exile	One	1 May 2011	3 May 2011	
Extras	Two	21 July 2005	27 December 2007	
Extra Gear	Three	29 May 2016	17 March 2019	Part of the Top Gear franchise

=== F ===
Title	Channel	First Broadcast	Last Broadcast	Notes
The Face of Britain	Two	30 September 2015	28 October 2015	
The Fall	Two	13 May 2013	28 October 2016	
The Fall and Rise of Reginald Perrin	One	8 September 1976	24 January 1979	
Fame Academy	One	4 October 2002	4 October 2003	
Family Guy	Two (2005; 2015); Three (2007–16)	22 October 2005	14 February 2016	Acquired from Fox
Family Guy: Creating the Chaos	Three	18 April 2009		
Family Guy: Groundbreaking Gags	Three	8 May 2011		
Family Guy: The Story So Far...	Three	18 April 2009		
Family Guy: The Top 20 Characters	Three	8 May 2010	9 May 2010	
Family Guy Presents: Seth & Alex's Almost Live Comedy Show	Three	8 May 2010		
Family Guys?: What Sitcoms Say About America Now	Two	27 October 2012		
Famous, Rich and Hungry	One	12 March 2014	13 March 2014	
Farscape	Two	29 November 1999	19 August 2007	Acquired from Nine Network
Fast and Loose	Two	14 January 2011	4 March 2011	
The Fast Show	Two	27 September 1994	29 December 1997	
Fast Track	World News	12 January 2013	1 February 2014	
Father Figure	One	18 September 2013	23 October 2013	
Father Ted: The Passion of Saint Tibulus	Two	8 November 2008		Acquired from Channel 4
Fawlty Towers	Two	19 September 1975	25 October 1979	
Feather Boy	One	16 March 2004	1 April 2004	
Feel the Force	Two	8 May 2006	12 June 2006	
Feud	Two	16 December 2017		Acquired from FX
The Field of Blood	One	8 May 2011	9 August 2013	
Film...	One	16 November 1971	28 March 2018	
Film Club	Three	7 October 2025	21 October 2025	
Finley the Fire Engine	One	23 July 2007	4 May 2014	
Fireman Sam	One	17 November 1987	25 December 2005	
First of the Summer Wine	One	3 January 1988	8 October 1989	
Five Bedrooms	One	10 March 2020	20 October 2023	Acquired from Network 10 (series 1) and Paramount+ (series 2–4)
Five by five	Three	27 March 2017		
Five to Eleven	One	27 October 1986	1990	
The First Churchills	One	27 September 1969	13 December 1969	
The First Team	Two	28 May 2020	2 July 2020	
Flash Gordon's Trip to Mars	One	25 June 1977	11 October 1997	
Fleabag	Three	21 July 2016	8 April 2019	
Flight of the Conchords	Four	15 April 2010	22 June 2010	
The Flintstones	One	4 September 1985		Acquired from ABC
Flower Pot Men	One	18 December 1952	4 September 2002	
The Flumps	One	14 February 1977	9 May 1977	
The Following Events Are Based on a Pack of Lies	One	29 August 2023	26 September 2023	
Food and Drink	Two	6 July 1982	13 April 2015	
Food Poker	Two	29 October 2007	7 December 2007	
For Facts Sake	One	15 October 2018	19 November 2018	
For the Children	One	1937; 9 June 1946	1939; December 1952	
For What It's Worth	One	4 January 2016	26 June 2016	
Forces of Nature	One	4 July 2016	25 July 2016	
The Forsyte Saga	Two	7 January 1967	1 July 1967	
Fox Wars	One	22 October 2013		
Francesco's Italy: Top to Toe	Two	11 June 2006	2 July 2006	
Francesco's Mediterranean Voyage	Two	8 July 2008	13 August 2008	
Francesco's Venice	Two	16 October 2004	6 November 2004	
Frank Skinner's Opinionated	Two	16 April 2010	15 December 2011	
Freaky Eaters	Three	14 February 2007	7 April 2009	
French and Saunders	Two (1987–93); One (1994–2017)	9 March 1987	25 December 2017	
The Fresh Prince of Bel-Air	Two	14 January 1991	2004	Acquired from NBC
Friday Night with Jonathan Ross	One	2 November 2001	16 July 2010	
From There to Here	One	22 May 2014	5 June 2014	
The Frost Report	One	10 March 1966	26 December 1967	
Frozen Planet	One	26 October 2011	28 December 2011	
Frozen Planet II	One	11 September 2022	16 October 2022	
Funland	Three	23 October 2005	7 November 2005	
The Funny Side of Christmas	One	27 December 1982		

=== G ===
Title	Channel	First Broadcast	Last Broadcast	Notes
Galactica 1980	Two	17 March 1988	1 June 1988	Acquired from ABC
Galápagos	Two	26 September 2006	13 October 2006	
Gallowglass	One	10 January 1993	24 January 1993	
The Game	Two	5 November 2014	10 December 2014	
The Gamechangers	Two	15 September 2015		
Game On	Two	27 February 1995	6 February 1998	
Ganges	Two	3 August 2007	17 August 2007	
Gangsters	One	9 September 1976	10 February 1978	
Garrow's Law	One	1 November 2009	4 December 2011	
Gavin & Stacey	Three (2007–08); One (2008–10; 19; 24)	13 May 2007	1 January 2010; 25 December 2019 (special); 25 December 2024 (special)	
The Generation Game	One	2 October 1971	8 April 2018	
Genius	Two	20 March 2009	31 October 2010	
The Genius of Invention	Two	24 January 2013	14 February 2013	
Gentleman Jack	One	19 May 2019	29 May 2022	Co-production with HBO
Get Even	iPlayer	14 February 2020		
George Washington	Two	27 July 1986; 1 August 1988	5 August 1986; 30 August 1988	Acquired from CBS
Get Back	One	26 October 1992	15 November 1993	
The Ghostbusters of East Finchley	Two	16 November 1995	21 December 1995	
Ghosts	One	15 April 2019	25 December 2023	Continued by the film Ghosts: The Possession of Button House (2026)
Ghostwatch	One	31 October 1992		
Gimme Gimme Gimme	Two (1999–2000); One (2001)	8 January 1999	14 December 2001	
Giri/Haji	Two	17 October	5 December 2019	Co-production with Netflix
The Girl in the Café	One	25 June 2005		
The Gnomes of Dulwich	Two	12 May 1969	16 June 1969	
God Bless Ozzy Osbourne	Two	29 January 2012		
God's Wonderful Railway	One	6 February 1980		
The Goes Wrong Show	One	23 December 2019	1 November 2021	
Going for a Song	One	6 October 1965	3 February 2002	
Going Live!	One	26 September 1987	17 April 1993	
Going Straight	One	24 February 1978	7 April 1978	
The Gold	One	12 February 2023	23 June 2025	Co-production with Paramount+ (series 1)
The Gone	Four	16 March 2024	15 August 2025	Acquired from TVNZ and RTÉ
The Good Life	One	4 April 1975	10 June 1978	
The Good Old Days	One	20 July 1953	31 December 1983	
Good Omens	Two	15 January 2020	19 February 2020	Co-production with Amazon Prime Video. Only the first series was broadcast on BBC. Series 2–3 released on Prime Video.
Good Trouble	Three	16 August 2020	3 October 2021	Acquired from Freeform; Only the first three series were broadcast on the BBC. Moved to Disney+
Goodbye, Mr. Chips	One	29 January 1984	4 February 1984	
The Goodies	Two	8 November 1970	18 February 1980	
Goodness Gracious Me	Two	12 January 1998; 26 May 2014	19 February 2001; 25 August 2015	
Goodnight Sweetheart	One	18 November 1993	28 June 1999	
Gordon Buchanan: Elephant Family & Me	Two	26 December 2016	27 December 2016	
Gordon Ramsay's Bank Balance	One	24 February 2021	14 March 2021	
Gormenghast	One	17 January 2000	7 February 2000	
Gossip Girl	One	25 August 2021	11 May 2023	Acquired from HBO Max
Grace & Favour	One	10 January 1992	8 February 1993	
Grandma's House	Two	9 August 2010	24 May 2012	
Grandstand	One	11 October 1958	28 January 2007	
Great Barrier Reef (2012)	Two	1 January 2012	15 January 2012	
Great Barrier Reef (2015)	One	30 December 2015	13 January 2016	
The Great British Bake Off	Two (2010–13); One (2014–16)	17 August 2010; 6 August 2014	22 October 2013; 26 October 2016	
Great British Garden Revival	Two	9 December 2013	21 January 2015	
Great Railway Journeys	Two	23 October 1980	6 April 1999	
The Great Rift: Africa's Wild Heart	Two	24 January 2010	7 February 2010	
The Great Train Robbery	One	18 December 2013	19 December 2013	
The Great War	One	30 May 1964	22 November 1964	
The Green Man	One	28 October 1990	11 November 1990	
The Green Planet	One	9 January 2022	6 February 2022	
Grime Kids	Three	13 November 2023	11 December 2023	
Ground Force	One	19 September 1997	24 July 2005	
The Grove Family	One	9 April 1954	28 June 1957	
Growing Pains	One	16 May 1992	14 July 1993	
The Gruffalo	One	25 December 2009		
The Gruffalo's Child	One	25 December 2011		
Grushko	One	24 March 1994	7 April 1994	
The Guess List	One	12 April 2014	24 May 2014	
Guesstimation	One	11 July 2009	29 August 2009	
Guilt	Scotland	30 October 2019	25 April 2023	
Gunpowder	One	21 October 2017	4 November 2017	
Gunpowder, Treason & Plot	Two	14 March 2004	21 March 2004	

=== H ===
Title	Channel	First Broadcast	Last Broadcast	Notes
Hamish Macbeth	One	26 March 1995	4 May 1997	
Hancock's Half Hour	One	6 July 1956	30 June 1961	
The Hanging Gale	One	14 May 1995	4 June 1995	
Happy Birthday BBC Two	Two	20 April 2004	16 April 2014	
Happy Ever After	One	7 May 1974	25 April 1979	
Happy Valley	One	29 April 2014	5 February 2023	
Hard Sun	One	6 January 2018	10 February 2018	
Harlots	Two	5 August 2020	21 October 2020	Acquired from ITV Encore and Hulu
Harry	One	18 September 1993	12 April 1995	
Harry and the Hendersons	One	27 September 1991	23 February 2001	Acquired from Universal Television
Harry & Paul	One (2007–08); Two (2010–12)	13 April 2007	2 December 2012	
Harry Enfield & Chums	Two (1990–92); One (1994–98)	8 November 1990	28 December 1998	
Hayley in Disneyland	One	25 December 1962		
Head Hunters	One	7 October 2019	15 November 2019	
Head on Comedy	One	13 July 2000	24 August 2000	
Heart to Heart	One	6 December 1962		
Heartburn Hotel	One	20 July 1998	28 July 2000	
Hebburn	Two	18 October 2012	22 December 2013	
The Heights	One	15 June 2020	27 July 2020	Acquired from ABC
Henpocalypse!	Two	15 August 2023	19 September 2023	
Heretic	Two	5 July 1994	9 August 1994	
Hereward the Wake	One	12 September 1965	26 December 1965	
Heroes	Two	25 July 2007	10 May 2021	Acquired from NBC
Hi-de-Hi!	One	1 January 1980	30 January 1988	
Hidden	One	6 October 2011	27 October 2011	
Hidden Kingdoms	One	16 January 2014	30 January 2014	
Highlands – Scotland's Wild Heart	One	11 May 2016	1 June 2016	
Him & Her	Three	6 September 2010	19 December 2013	
Hinterland	Wales	4 January 2014	18 December 2016	
His Dark Materials	One	3 November 2019	5 February 2023	Co-production with HBO
A History of Ancient Britain	Two	2011		
A History of Britain	One	30 September 2000	18 June 2002	
The Hitchhiker's Guide to the Galaxy	Two	5 January 1981	9 February 1981	
Holby City	One	12 January 1999	29 March 2022	
Hold the Back Page	One	12 November 1985	28 January 1986	
Hole in the Wall	One	20 September 2008	12 December 2009	
Hold the Sunset	One	18 February 2018	6 September 2019	
Holiday	One	2 January 1969	19 March 2007	
Holidays in the Danger Zone	Two	31 January 2003	1 June 2005	
The Hollow Crown	Two	30 June 2012	21 May 2016	
Hollywood 7	One	27 September 2001	20 December 2001	
Hollywood Science	Two	2001	2002	
Home Again	One	5 May 2006	9 June 2006	
Home Farm Twins	One	7 January 1999	30 March 2000	
Homefront	One	1992	1997	
Honey for Tea	One	13 March 1994	24 April 1994	
Honey, We're Killing the Kids	Three	2006		
The Honourable Woman	Two	3 July 2014	21 August 2014	
Hope and Glory	One	22 June 1999	5 November 2000	
Hope Springs	One	7 June 2009	26 July 2009	
Horne & Corden	Three	10 March 2009	14 April 2009	
Hospital People	One	21 April 2017	12 May 2017	
Hostages	Four	2014		
Hotel Babylon	One	19 January 2006	14 August 2009	
Hotel of Mum and Dad	Three	3 October 2013	7 November 2014	
House of Cards	One	18 November 1990	9 December 1990	
The House of Eliott	One	31 August 1991	6 March 1994	
House of Fools	Two	14 January 2014	30 March 2015	
The House of Tiny Tearaways	Three	1 May 2005	21 December 2007	
The House that £100k Built	Two	18 September 2013	31 March 2017	
How Do You Solve a Problem Like Maria?	One	29 July 2006	16 September 2006	
How Do You View?	BBC TV	26 October 1949	9 September 1953	
How God Made the English	Two	17 March 2012	31 March 2012	
How Not to Live Your Life	Three	27 September 2007	22 December 2011	
How to Grow a Planet	One	7 February 2012	21 February 2012	
How TV Ruined Your Life	Two	25 January 2011	8 March 2011	
How We Got to Now with Steven Johnson	Two	2015		
Howards End	One	12 November 2017	3 December 2017	
Howards' Way	One	1 September 1985	25 November 1990	
Human, All Too Human	Two	9 August 1999	11 August 1999	
The Human Animal	One	27 July 1994	31 August 1994	
The Human Body	One	20 May 1998	25 June 1998	
The Human Face	One	7 March 2001	25 March 2001	
Human Planet	One	13 January 2011	3 March 2011	
Human Universe	Two	7 October 2014	4 November 2014	
The Hunt	One	1 November 2015	13 December 2015	
Hunted	One	4 October 2012	22 November 2012	
Hustle	One	24 February 2004	17 February 2012	

=== I ===
Title	Channel	First Broadcast	Last Broadcast	Notes
I, Claudius	Two	20 September 1976	6 December 1976	
I Love...	Two	22 July 2000	3 November 2001	
I, Lovett	Two	9 June 1989	28 April 1993	
Ian Hislop's Stiff Upper Lip - An Emotional History of Britain	Two	2 October 2012	15 October 2012	
Ice Age Giants	Two	19 May 2013	2 June 2013	
Iceland Foods: Life in the Freezer Cabinet	Two	21 October 2013	4 November 2013	
I'd Do Anything	One	15 March 2008	31 May 2008	
Ideal	Three	11 January 2005	30 June 2011	
If...	Two	10 March 2004	30 May 2006	
I'll Get This	Two	6 November 2018	12 May 2020	
Ill Behaviour	Two	22 July 2017	3 September 2017	
I'm Alan Partridge	Two	3 November 1997	16 December 2002	
I'm in a Rock 'n' Roll Band!	Two	1 May 2010	5 June 2010	
The Impressionists	Two	30 April 2006	14 May 2006	
The Impressions Show with Culshaw and Stephenson	One	31 October 2009	21 December 2011	
In and Out of the Kitchen	Four	11 March 2015	25 March 2015	
In Deep	One	19 February 2001	4 March 2003	
In the Club	One	5 August 2014	7 June 2016	
In the Dark	One	11 July 2017	1 August 2017	
In The Flesh	Three	17 March 2013	8 June 2014	
In the Footsteps of Alexander the Great	Two	14 July 1998	4 August 1998	
In the Night Garden...	Two	19 March 2007	6 March 2009	
In the Red	Two	26 May 1998	9 June 1998	
In My Skin	Three	14 October 2018	7 November 2021	
In the Teeth of Jaws	Two	8 November 1997		
In with the Flynns	One	8 June 2011	21 September 2012	
India: Nature's Wonderland	Two (2015); Four (2022)	1 September 2015; 31 January 2022	8 September 2015; 1 February 2022	
The Indian Doctor	One	15 November 2010	8 November 2013	
Informer	One	16 October 2018	20 November 2018	
Inside Claridge's	Two	3 December 2012	17 December 2012	
Inside Men	One	2 February 2012	23 February 2012	
Insides Out	One	15 September 1999	22 December 2000	
Inside No. 9	Two	5 February 2014	12 June 2024	
Inside the Perfect Predator	One	25 March 2010	7 May 2021	
The Inspector Alleyn Mysteries	One	23 December 1990	29 August 1994	
Inspector George Gently	One	8 April 2007	30 October 2017	
The Inspector Lynley Mysteries	One	12 March 2001	1 June 2008	
Inspector Montalbano	Four	13 December 2008	13 May 2023	Acquired from Rai 1
The Interceptor	One	10 June 2015	29 July 2015	
Into the West	Two	4 November 2006		Acquired from TNT
Invasion of the Job Snatchers	Three	2 April 2014	7 May 2014	
The Invisible Man (1975)	One	26 September 1975	27 August 1976	Acquired from NBC
The Invisible Man (1984)	One	4 September 1984	9 October 1984	
The Invisibles	One	1 May 2008	5 June 2008	
I Survived a Zombie Apocalypse	Three	15 February 2015	30 March 2015	
It Ain't Half Hot Mum	One	3 January 1974	3 September 1981	
It's Lulu	One	11 July 1970	24 November 1973	
It's Only a Theory	Four	6 October 2009	24 November 2009	
It's Only TV...but I Like It	One	3 June 1999	16 August 2002	

=== J ===
Title	Channel	First Broadcast	Last Broadcast	Notes
Jam & Jerusalem	One	24 November 2006	23 August 2009	
Jamaica Inn	One	21 April 2014	23 April 2014	
James May's Cars of the People	Two HD	10 August 2014	7 February 2016	Part of the Top Gear franchise
James May's Man Lab	Two	31 October 2010	25 April 2013	
Japan: Earth's Enchanted Islands	Two	8 April 2015	22 June 2015	
Jekyll	One	16 June 2007	28 July 2007	
Jerk	Three	24 February 2019	28 March 2023	
Jet Set	One	20 January 2001	8 August 2007	
Jinx	Two	31 October 2009	23 January 2010	
John Bishop's Britain	One	24 July 2010	27 December 2011	
Joking Apart	Two	7 January 1993	7 February 1995	
Jonathan Creek	One	10 May 1997	28 December 2016	
Jonathan Strange & Mr Norrell	One	17 May 2015	28 June 2015	
Jonny Briggs	One	11 November 1985	20 January 1987	
Jonny Quest	One	6 January 1965	30 June 1965	Acquired from ABC
Josephine Terry's Kitchen	One	11 November 1946	12 May 1947	
Josh	Three (2015); One (2016–17)	11 November 2015	6 November 2017	
Joshua Jones	One	1992	2009	
Judge John Deed	One	9 January 2001	18 January 2007	
Juice	Three	18 September 2023	18 September 2025	
Juke Box Jury	One (1959–1967; 1979); Two (1989–1990)	1 June 1959	25 November 1990	
Juliet Bravo	One	30 August 1980	21 December 1985	
Jumbo: The Plane that Changed the World	Two	27 February 2014		
Junior Doctors: Your Life in Their Hands	Three	22 February 2011	28 February 2013	
Junior Paramedics	Three	27 February 2014	8 April 2014	
Just Act Normal	Three	16 April 2025	30 April 2025	
Just Good Friends	One	22 September 1983	25 December 1986	

=== K ===
Title	Channel	First Broadcast	Last Broadcast	Notes
K-9 and Company	One	28 December 1981		Part of the Doctor Who franchise
Kaleidoscope	BBC TV	22 November 1946	26 June 1953	
Kat & Alfie: Redwater	One	18 May 2017	22 June 2017	
Katy Keene	iPlayer	25 July 2020		Acquired from The CW
Keeping Up Appearances	One	29 October 1990	25 December 1995	
The Kenny Everett Television Show	One	24 December 1981	18 January 1988	
Keeping Faith	Wales	13 February 2018	1 May 2021	Co-production with S4C
Kevin Bridges: What's the Story?	One	8 February 2012	14 March 2012	
A Kick Up the Eighties	One	21 September 1981	24 January 1984	
The Kids Are All Right	One	12 April 2008	14 June 2008	
The Kids International Show	One	31 May 1982	24 December 1982	
Killer Magic	Three	24 March 2015	28 April 2015	
Killing Eve	One	15 September 2018	17 April 2022	Acquired from BBC America
Kin	One	18 November 2023	6 March 2024	Acquired from RTÉ and AMC+ (series 2)
The King Is Dead	Three	2 September 2010	14 October 2010	
King Charles III	Two	10 May 2017		One-off drama
King Gary	One	10 January 2020	3 September 2021	
King Lear	Two	28 May 2018		One-off drama
King of the Rocket Men	Two	9 March 1981; 23 December 1991	20 March 1981; 7 January 1992	
Kingdom	One	9 November 2025	14 December 2025	
Kiss Me Kate	One	4 May 1998	26 December 2000	
Kiss of Death	One	26 May 2008		One-off drama
Kitty Clive	One	27 March 1956		
Knots Landing	One	26 April 1980		
Knowing Me Knowing You with Alan Partridge	Two	16 September 1994	21 October 1994	
Knowitalls	Two	27 July 2009	14 August 2009	
Kojak	One	23 August 1974	6 March 1982	
Kröd Mändoon and the Flaming Sword of Fire	Two	11 June 2009	6 July 2009	
The Kumars at No. 42	Two (2001–04); One (2005–06)	12 November 2001	18 August 2006	
Kyle XY	Two	2007	2009	Acquired from ABC Family
KYTV	Two	12 May 1989	22 October 1993	

=== L ===
Title	Channel	First Broadcast	Last Broadcast	Notes
Ladhood	Three	24 November 2019	5 September 2022	
Land of Giants / The Giant Claw	One	30 December 2002	1 January 2003	
Land of the Tiger	Two	17 November 1997	26 December 1997	
Laramie	One	17 October 1959	19 September 1965	Acquired from NBC
Lark Rise to Candleford	One	13 January 2008	13 February 2011	
The Last Enemy	One	17 February 2008	16 March 2008	
The Last Kingdom	Two	10 October 2015	4 May 2017	Moved to Netflix for series 3–5. Continued by the film The Last Kingdom: Seven Kings Must Die (2023) on Netflix.
Last of the Summer Wine	One	4 January 1973	29 August 2010	
Last Tango in Halifax	One	20 November 2012	20 December 2016	
The Last Post	One	2017		
The Late Edition	Four	2005	2008	
The Late, Late Breakfast Show	One	4 September 1982	8 November 1986	
The Late Show	Two	1989	1995	
Laurel and Hardy	One	3 June 1948		
The League of Gentlemen	Two	11 January 1999	12 January 2020	
Lee Mack's All Star Cast	One	18 June 2011	23 July 2011	
Lee Nelson's Well Funny People	Three	14 March 2013	26 April 2013	
Lee Nelson's Well Good Show	Three	10 June 2010	13 October 2011	
Leigh-Anne: Race, Pop & Power	Three	13 May 2021		
Les Misérables (2018)	One	30 December 2018	3 February 2019	
Life	One	12 October 2009	14 December 2009	
Life in Cold Blood	One	4 February 2008	3 March 2008	
Life in Colour with David Attenborough	Two	28 February 2021	22 April 2021	Co-production with Netflix
Life in Squares	Two	27 July 2015	10 August 2015	
Life in the Air	One	3 April 2016	17 April 2016	
Life in the Freezer	One	18 November 1993	23 December 1993	
Life in the Snow	One	29 December 2016		
Life in the Undergrowth	One	23 November 2005	21 December 2005	
The Life of Birds	One	21 October 1998	23 December 1998	
The Life of Mammals	One	20 November 2002	5 February 2003	
Life of Riley	One	8 January 2009	1 June 2011	
The Life of Rock with Brian Pern	Four	10 February 2014	24 February 2014	
Life on Air: David Attenborough's 50 Years in Television	One	2002		
Life on Earth	Two	16 January 1979	10 April 1979	
Life on Mars	One	9 January 2006	10 April 2007	
Life Story	One	23 October 2014	27 November 2014	
Light Fantastic	Four	1 December 2004	22 December 2004	
The Likely Lads	Two	16 December 1964	23 July 1966	
The Line of Beauty	Two	17 May 2006	31 May 2006	
The Link	One	5 May 2014	17 July 2015	
Liquid News	Choice (2000–03); Three (2003–04)	30 May 2000	1 April 2004	
Liquid Television	Two	13 May 1991	26 October 1992	Co-production with MTV
Little Britain	Three (2003–04); One (2005–06)	9 February 2003	30 December 2006	
Little Britain USA	One	2008		
Little Dorrit	One	2008		
The Little Drummer Girl	One	2018		Co-production with AMC
Little House on the Prairie	One	3 January 1975	26 June 1976	Acquired from NBC
Little Miss	One	14 February 1983; 27 January 1988	15 June 1987; 22 December 1988	
Little Women	One	26 December 2017	28 December 2017	
Live & Kicking	One	2 October 1993	15 September 2001	
Live at the Electric	Three	31 May 2012	28 February 2014	
The Living and the Dead	One	28 June 2016	2 August 2016	
Living Britain	Two	31 October 1999	5 December 1999	
Living in the Past	Two	23 February 1978	11 May 1978	
The Living Planet	One	19 January 1984	12 April 1984	
Local Heroes	Two	1994	2000	
London Spy	Two	9 November 2015	7 December 2015	
The Long Song	One	2018		
Look and Read	One	9 January 1967	29 March 2004	
Look Around You	Two	10 October 2002	7 March 2005	
Looking For Alaska	Three	19 October 2019	9 November 2019	Acquired from Hulu
The Lost Decade	Four	2005	2006	
Louis Theroux's Weird Weekends	Two	15 January 1998	30 October 2000	
Love Hurts	One	3 January 1992	18 March 1994	
Love, Lies and Records	One	16 November 2017	21 December 2017	
Love, Nina	One	20 May 2016	17 June 2016	
Love Soup	One	27 September 2005	17 May 2008	
Lovejoy	One	10 January 1986	4 December 1994	
Lum the Invader Girl	Choice	5 August 2000		
Lunch Monkeys	Three	12 May 2008	10 March 2011	
Luther	One	4 May 2010	4 January 2019	Continued by the films Luther: The Fallen Sun (2023) and Luther 3 (TBA) on Netflix

=== M ===
Title	Channel	First Broadcast	Last Broadcast	Notes
Mad Men	Four	2 March 2008		Acquired from AMC
Madagascar	Two	9 February 2011	23 February 2011	
Madhouse on Castle Street	One	13 January 1963		
Maestro	Two	12 August 2008	13 September 2008	
The Magicians	One	1 January 2011	11 February 2012	
Maid Marian and Her Merry Men	One	16 November 1989	16 February 1994	
Make Me Famous	Three	17 June 2020		
Making Life on Earth: Attenborough’s Greatest Adventure	One	3 May 2026		
Making Out	One	6 January 1989	12 November 1991	
Malcolm in the Middle	Two	6 April 2001	2009	
The Mallorca Files	One	25 November 2019	8 February 2021	Moved to Amazon Prime Video for the third series
Snowy River: The McGregor Saga	Two	1994	1997	
Man in an Orange Shirt	Two	31 July 2017	7 August 2017	
Man Like Mobeen	Three	6 October 2016 (pilot); 17 December 2017	15 May 2025	
The Man With the Flower in His Mouth	One	14 July 1930		
Manchild	Two	February 2002	April 2003	
Manga!	Two	7 January 1994		
Mapp & Lucia	One	29 December 2014	31 December 2014	
Marie Antoinette	Two	29 December 2022	26 June 2025	Co-production with Canal+
Marie Stopes: Sexual Revolutionary	One	25 June 1970		
Martin's Close	Four	24 December 2019		
Martin Chuzzlewit	Two	7 November 1994	12 December 1994	
Marvellous	Two	25 September 2014		
Mary, Mungo and Midge	One	7 October 1969	30 December 1969	
The Mary Whitehouse Experience	Two	3 October 1990	6 April 1992	
Match of the Day from Northern Ireland	Northern Ireland	1985		
Match of the Day Kickabout	Two	8 January 2011	27 March 2021	
Material Girl	One	14 January 2010	18 February 2010	
The Matt Lucas Awards	One	10 April 2012	17 December 2013	
Mayans M.C.	Two	2 February 2019	4 July 2021	Acquired from FX; Only the first three series were broadcast on the BBC. Moved to Disney+
McMafia	One	1 January 2018	11 February 2018	Co-production with AMC
Mechannibals	Two	2005		
Megamaths	Two	16 September 1996	4 February 200	
Meerkat: A Dynasties Special	One	28 December 2020		
Meet the Ancestors	Two	8 January 1998	2004	
Meet the Romans with Mary Beard	Four	17 April 2012	1 May 2012	
Melvyn Bragg on Class and Culture	Two	24 February 2012	9 March 2012	
Men Behaving Badly	One	1 July 1994	28 December 1998	
Men of the World	One	14 March 1994	30 August 1995	
Merlin	One	20 September 2008	24 December 2012	
Merlin: Secrets and Magic	One	19 September 2009	21 December 2009	
Messiah	One	26 May 2001	21 January 2008	
Miami Vice	One	4 March 1985	20 August 1990	
The Michael McIntyre Chat Show	One	10 March 2014	25 December 2014	
Michael McIntyre's Comedy Roadshow	One	6 June 2009	25 December 2011	
Michel Roux's Service	Two	12 January 2011	3 February 2011	
Middlemarch	Two	12 January 1994	16 February 1994	
The Mighty Boosh	Three	18 May 2004	20 December 2007	
Millionaire Manor	One	3 December 2005	4 March 2006	
The Mind of Herbert Clunkerdunk	Two	4 August 2019	9 February 2022	
Mind the Gap: London vs the Rest	Two	3 March 2014	10 March 2014	
The Miniaturist	One	26 December 2017	27 December 2017	
Miranda	Two (2009–10); One (2012–15)	9 November 2009	1 January 2015	
Misbehaving Mums To Be	Three	14 April 2011	10 June 2011	
The Missing	One	28 October 2014	30 November 2016	
Mister Maker	One; Two	17 September 2007	12 April 2009	
Mister Winner	Two	25 March 2020		
Monarch of the Glen	One	27 February 2000	23 October 2005	
The Money Programme	Two	5 April 1966	9 November 2010	
Mongrels	Three	22 June 2010	19 December 2011	
Mongrels Uncovered	Three	7 November 2011		
Monkey Dust	Three	9 February 2003	8 February 2005	
Monkey Planet	One	2 April 2014	16 April 2014	
Monty Python Live at Aspen	21 March 1998	Acquired from HBO		
Monty Python's Flying Circus	One (1969–73); Two (1974)	5 October 1969	5 December 1974	
Monty Python's Personal Best	22 February 2006	8 March 2006	Acquired from PBS	
The Moonstone	One	16 January 1972	13 February 1972	
The Moonstone	One	31 October 2016	4 November 2016	
The Moorside	One	7 February 2017	14 February 2017	
The Morecambe & Wise Show	Two (1968–71); One (1971–77)	2 September 1968	25 December 1977	
Most Annoying People	Three	27 December 2006	26 December 2011	
MotherFatherSon	Two	6 March 2019	24 April 2019	
Motherland	Two (2016–21); One (2022)	9 June 2016 (pilot); 7 November 2017	23 December 2022	
Fort Salem	Three	26 July 2020	30 October 2022	Acquired from Freeform
The Secrets She Keeps	One	6 July 2020	13 August 2022	Acquired from Network 10 (series 1) and Paramount+ (series 2)
Mountain: Life at the Extreme	Two	2017		
Moving On	One	18 May 2009	12 March 2021	
Mr Benn	One	25 February 1971	31 March 1972	
Mr Loverman	One	14 October	4 November 2024	
Mr. Men	One	31 December 1974	22 December 1988	
Mr Tumble	Two	1 September 2003	12 February 2016	
Mrs Wilson	One	27 November 2018	11 December 2018	
Muffin the Mule	One	20 October 1946; September 2005	27 January 1957; August 2008	
Mulberry	One	24 February 1992	25 May 1993	
Mum	Two	13 May 2016	19 June 2019	
The Munsters	Two	1 April 1965		
Muppet Magic	One	2 February 1986		
The Muppet Show	One	8 February 1986	3 September 1999	
Muppets Tonight	One	13 September 1996	4 Oct 1996	Acquired from ABC
Murder	Two	26 August 2012	17 March 2016	
The Murder Game	One	29 March 2003	24 May 2003	
Murder in Successville	Three	6 May 2015	24 May 2017	
Murder Most Horrid	Two	14 November 1991	2 April 1999	
Murder, She Wrote	One	30 June 2002		Acquired from CBS
Music Makers	Two	1994	2007	
The Musketeers	One	19 January 2014	1 August 2016	
My Family	One	19 September 2000	2 September 2011	
My Hero	One	4 February 2000	10 September 2006	
My Mother and Other Strangers	One	13 November 2016	11 December 2016	
My Wife Next Door	One	19 September 1972	12 December 1972	
The Mystery of Edwin Drood	Two	10 January 2012	11 January 2012	

=== N ===
Title	Channel	First Broadcast	Last Broadcast	Notes
The Naked Chef	Two	14 April 1999	19 December 2001	
The Naked Choir	Two	22 September 2015	27 October 2015	
Naked Us	One	2004		
The Name of the Rose	Two	2019		
Nationwide	One	1969	1983	
Natural World	Two	1983	2020	
Nature's Epic Journeys	One	2016		
Nature's Great Events	One	2009		
Nature's Greatest Dancers	One	2015		
Nature's Microworlds	Four	2012	2013	
Nature's Miracle Babies	One	2011		
Nature's Miracle Orphans	One	2014		
Nature's Wonderlands: Islands of Evolution	Four	2016		
Neighbours	One	1985	2008	
The Nest	One	22 March 2020	13 April 2020	
Never Mind the Buzzcocks	Two	1996	2015	Moved to Sky Max
The New Adventures of Superman	One	8 January 1994	2002	Acquired from ABC
New Blood	One	9 June 2016	21 July 2016	
New Street Law	One	2006	2007	
New Tricks	One	2003	2015	
New Zealand: Earth's Mythical Islands	Two	2016		
The Newsreader	Two	24 July 2022	26 September 2025	Acquired from ABC
Newsround	One	1971	2012	
Nigella Express	Two	2006	2009	
Nighty Night	Three	2004	2005	
Nineteen Eighty-Four	One	12 December 1954	16 December 1954	
The Noel Edmonds Saturday Roadshow	One	3 September 1988	15 December 1990	
Noel's House Party	One	23 November 1991	20 March 1999	
Not in Front of the Children	One	26 May 1967	9 January 1970	
Not the Nine O'Clock News	Two	16 October 1979	8 March 1982	
Numberblocks	Four	2017	2022	
Numbertime	Two	1993	2001	
Noughts + Crosses	One	5 March 2020	17 May 2022	
NW	Two	14 November 2016		

=== O ===
Title	Channel	First Broadcast	Last Broadcast	Notes
Ocean Giants	One	14 August 2011	28 August 2011	
Ocean Odyssey	One	24 May 2006	29 June 2006	
Oceans	Two	12 November 2008	19 December 2008	
Odd One Out	One	16 April 1982	19 April 1985	
Odyssey	Two	28 June 2015	13 March 2018	
The Office	Two (2001–02); One (2003)	9 July 2001	27 December 2003	
Oh, Brother!	One	13 September 1968	27 February 1970	
Oh, Doctor Beeching!	One	14 August 1995	28 September 1997	
Oh Happy Band!	One	3 September 1980	8 October 1980	
The Old Grey Whistle Test	Two (1971–88); Four (2018)	21 September 1971	23 February 2018	
The Old Guys	One	31 January 2009	13 August 2010	
Oliver's Travels	One	11 June 1995	9 July 1995	
Oliver Twist	One	18 December 2007	22 December 2007	
The Omid Djalili Show	One	17 November 2007	25 May 2009	
Omnibus	One (1967–2001); Two (2001–03)	13 October 1967	8 January 2003	
On the Record	One	18 September 1988	15 December 2002	
On the Spot	One	29 July 2000	2 September 2000	
One by One	One	29 January 1984	2 May 1987	
One Foot in the Grave	One	4 January 1990	20 November 2000	
One Man and His Dog	Two (1976–2012); One (2013–23)	17 February 1976	2023	
One Night	One	26 March 2012	30 March 2012	
One of Us	One	23 August 2016	13 September 2016	
The One...	One	25 December 2010	16 January 2012	
The Onedin Line	One	15 October 1971	26 October 1980	
Only Child	Scotland	21 November 2024	8 June 2026	
Only Fools and Horses	One	8 September 1981	25 December 2003	
Open All Hours	Two (1973–76); One (1981–85)	23 March 1973	6 October 1985	
Operation Good Guys	Two	29 December 1997	31 August 2000	
Operation Grand Canyon with Dan Snow	Two	5 January 2014	12 January 2014	
Ordinary Lies	One	17 March 2015	22 November 2016	
Ordeal by Innocence	One	1 April 2018	15 April 2018	
Orphan Black	Three	20 September 2013	4 October 2015	Acquired from Space and BBC America
The Other Half	One	7 June 1997	2 February 2002	
The Other One	One	13 September 2017 (pilot); 5 June 2020	6 May 2022	
Our Flag Means Death	Two	28 January 2023	11 March 2024	Acquired from HBO Max (series 1) and Max (series 2)
Our Friends in the North	Two	15 January 1996	11 March 1996	
Our Girl	One	24 March 2013	28 April 2020	
Our World	News	2007		
Our Zoo	One	3 September 2014	8 October 2014	
Out of Her Mind	Two	20 October 2020	24 November 2020	
Out of the Blue (1995)	One	23 May 1995	9 September 1996	
Out of the Blue (2008)	One (2008); Two (2008–09)	28 April 2008	29 January 2009	
Outcasts	One	7 February 2011	13 March 2011	
The Outlaws	One	25 October 2021	27 June 2024	Co-production with Amazon Prime Video
Outnumbered	One	28 August 2007	26 December 2016; 25 December 2024 (special)	
Outrageous	iPlayer	5 December 2025		Acquired from BritBox
Overshadowed	Three	1 October 2017		

=== P ===
Title	Channel	First Broadcast	Last Broadcast	Notes
Pacific Abyss	One	2008		
The Pact	One	17 May 2021	28 November 2022	
Pan Am	Two	2012		
The Paper Chase	Two	26 April 1979	5 April 1986	Acquired from CBS and Showtime
Parade's End	Two	24 August 2012	21 September 2012	
The Paradise Club	One	19 September 1989	27 November 1990	
Parenthood	One	3 August 2025	31 August 2025	
Parkinson	One	19 June 1971	24 April 2004	
Parks and Recreation	Four	6 March 2013	2 April 2014	Acquired from NBC
Parrot Sketch Not Included – 20 Years of Monty Python	One	18 November 1989		
Partners in Crime	One	26 July 2015	30 August 2015	
The Passing Bells	One	3 November 2014	7 November 2014	
Pat and Margaret	One	11 September 1994		One-off drama
Patagonia: Earth's Secret Paradise	Two	25 September 2015	9 October 2015	
Pathways of Belief	Two	7 October 1996	2001	
Paul Hollywood's Pies and Puds	One	4 November 2013	29 November 2013	
Paul Merton's Birth of Hollywood	Two	27 May 2011	10 June 2011	
Paula	Two	25 May 2017	8 June 2017	
Peacock	Three	25 April 2022	2 July 2024	
Peaky Blinders	Two (2013–17); One (2019–22)	12 September 2013	3 April 2022	Continued by the film Peaky Blinders: The Immortal Man (2026) on Netflix
Pebble Mill at One	One	2 October 1972	29 March 1996	
Pennies from Heaven	Two	7 March 1978	11 April 1978	
The Pennine Challenge	One	17 November 1991	8 December 1991	
The Pennine Way (1972)	One	6 August 1972		One-off drama
The Pennine Way (2015)	One	10 April 2015	1 May 2015	
People Just Do Nothing	Three	20 July 2014	17 December 2018	
People Like Us	Two	2013	2014	
The People's Quiz	One	24 March 2007	23 June 2007	
Perfect World	One	25 February 2000	25 June 2001	
Perfection	Two (2011–12; 15); One (2013–14)	17 January 2011	30 March 2015	
Performance	Two	5 October 1991	21 March 1998	
Permission Impossible: Britain's Planners	Two	25 February 2014	11 March 2014	
Personal Affairs	Three	16 June 2009	14 July 2009	
Peter Kay's Car Share	One	29 April 2015	28 May 2018	
Petrocelli	One	21 April 1978	2 November 1979	Acquired from NBC
Petrolheads	Two	12 February 2006	19 March 2006	
The Phil Silvers Show	One	20 April 1957	5 November 2004	Acquired from CBS
Phoenix Rise	Three	21 March 2023	25 October 2024	
Pianos I Have Known	BBC TV	28 January 1958	25 February 1958	
Picture Book	BBC TV	14 February 1955	23 September 1963	
A Picture of Britain	One	5 June 2005	10 July 2005	
Picture Page	One	8 October 1936	1939	
The Pink Panther Show	One (1970–86); Two (1986–2011)	12 September 1970	28 November 2011	
Pinwright's Progress	BBC TV	29 November 1946	16 May 1947	
Pitch Battle	One	17 June 2017	22 July 2017	
Planet Dinosaur	One	14 September 2011	19 October 2011	
Planet Earth	One	5 March 2006	10 December 2006	
Planet Earth II	One	6 November 2016	11 December 2016	
Planet Earth III	One	22 October 2023	10 December 2023	
Planet Earth: A Celebration	One	31 August 2020		
Planet Earth: The Future	Four	26 November 2006	10 December 2006	
Planet Earth Live	One	6 May 2012	24 May 2012	
The Planets (1999)	Two	29 April 1999	17 June 1999	
The Planets (2019)	Two	29 May 2019	25 June 2019	
The Planners	Two	31 January 2013	21 March 2013	
The Planners Are Coming	One	11 September 2008	14 April 2009	
The Plantagenets	Two	17 March 2014	31 March 2014	
Play for Today	One	15 October 1970	28 August 1984	
Play for Tomorrow	One	13 April 1982	18 May 1982	
Play of the Month	One	19 October 1965	12 September 1983	
The Play on One	One	19 January 1988	29 August 1991	
Play School	Two (1964–83); One (1983–88)	21 April 1964	11 March 1988	
Playdays	One	17 October 1988	28 March 1997	
The Poet	One	25 October 1960		
The Polar Bear Family and Me	Two	2013		
Poldark (1975)	One	5 October 1975	4 December 1977	
Poldark (2015)	One	8 March 2015	26 August 2019	
The Politician's Husband	Two	April 2013		
The Politics Show	One	2003	2011	
Pop Life	Two	2012		
Porridge	One	5 September 1974	25 March 1977	
Pose	Two	21 March 2019	8 August 2021	Acquired from FX
Posh Nosh	Two	2003		
The Possessed	Two	25 January 1969	1 March 1969	
Postman Pat	One	16 September 1981	29 March 2017	
Pound Shop Wars	One	2014		
The Power of Nightmares	Two	2004		
The Power of Parker	One	28 July 2023	4 July 2025	
Pramface	Three	2012	2014	
Prehistoric Autospy	Two	2012		
Premiere	Two	22 September 1977	24 November 1980	
Press	One	2018		
Pretty Little Liars	One	10 January 2023	3 September 2024	Acquired from HBO Max (series 1) and Max (series 2)
Pride	One	2004		
Pride and Prejudice (1995)	One	1995		
A Prince Among Men	One	15 September 1997	14 June 1998	
Prisoners' Wives	One	31 January 2012	4 April 2013	
The Private Life of a Masterpiece	Two	8 December 2001	25 December 2010	
The Private Life of Plants	One	11 January 1995	15 February 1995	
Prometheus: The Life of Balzac	Two	20 October 1975	24 November 1975	
Protecting Our Children	Two	30 January 2012	13 February 2012	
PRU	Three	2 March 2021 (pilot); 26 May 2022	16 June 2022	
Public Account	One	6 January 1975	3 July 1978	
Public Enemies	One	4 January 2012	6 January 2012	
Pulling	Three	23 November 2006	17 May 2009	
Puppy Love	Four	13 November 2014	18 December 2014	
Python Night – 30 Years of Monty Python	Two	9 October 1999		

=== Q ===
Title	Channel	First Broadcast	Last Broadcast	Notes
Q...	Two	24 March 1969	25 October 1982	
Quantum Leap	Two	13 February 1990	28 December 1999	Acquired from NBC
Quatermass II	BBC TV	22 October 1955	26 November 1955	Second installment in the Quatermass series
Quatermass and the Pit	BBC TV	22 December 1958	26 January 1959	Third installment in the Quatermass series
The Quatermass Experiment (1953)	BBC TV	18 July 1953	22 August 1953	First installment in the Quatermass series
The Quatermass Experiment (2005)	Four	2 April 2005		One-off drama; remake of the 1953 serial
Queen of Oz	One	16 June 2023	21 July 2023	
Queers	Four	31 July 2017	3 August 2017	
A Question of Genius	Two	16 March 2009	4 June 2010	
Quincy, M.E.	One	22 June 1994	2003	
Quirke	One	25 May 2014	8 June 2014	

=== R ===
Title	Channel	First Broadcast	Last Broadcast	Notes
The Railway: Keeping Britain On Track	Two	12 February 2013	19 March 2013	
Rain Dogs	One	4 April 2023	23 May 2023	Co-production with HBO
Ralph & Katie	One	5 October 2022	19 October 2022	
Raven	One	2002	2010	
Ready Steady Cook	Two (1994–2010); One (1997–2003; 2020–21)	24 October 1994	15 April 2021	
Real Rescues	One	15 October 2007	25 October 2013	
Real Story	One	10 March 2003		
Red Alert	One	1999	2000	
Red Dwarf	Two	15 February 1988	5 April 1999	
Reflex	One	2014		
Reg	One	6 June 2016		
Reggie Perrin	One	2010	2011	
Rellik	One	2017		
Remington Steele	One	3 September 1983	27 September 1994	Acquired from NBC
Remember Me	One	23 November 2014	7 December 2014	
The Ren & Stimpy Show	Two	10 January 1994	10 May 1999	Acquired from Nickelodeon
The Replacement	One	28 February 2017	14 March 2017	
Requiem	One	2 February 2018	6 March 2018	
The Responder	One	24 January 2022	5 May 2024	
Responsible Child	Two	16 December 2019		
The Restaurant	Two	29 August 2007	17 December 2009	
Restoration	Two	8 August 2003	25 April 2009	
Restoration Home	Two	5 July 2011	28 August 2013	
Rev.	One	28 June 2010	28 April 2014	
Revenge of the Egghead	Two	24 February 2014	4 April 2014	
Rex the Runt	Two (1998–2001); Four (2005)	21 December 1998	19 April 2005	
Rich Hall's Fishing Show	Four	2003		
Richard Hammond Meets Evel Knievel	Two	2007		
The Riff Raff Element	One	1993	1994	
Rillington Place	One	29 November 2016	13 December 2016	
Ripper Street	One	30 December 2012	24 July 2017	
Ripping Yarns	One	1976	1979	
River	One	13 October 2015	17 November 2015	
River City	Scotland	24 September 2002	31 August 2026	
The Rob Brydon Show	Two	2010	2012	
Rob Brydon's Annually Retentive	Three	2006	2007	
Robin Hood (1953)	BBC TV	17 March 1953	21 April 1953	
Robin Hood (2006)	One	7 October 2006	27 June 2009	
Robot Wars	Two (1998–2002; 2016–18); Choice (2001–03)	1998; 2016	2003; 2018	
Rock Profile	Two	24 December 2000	18 March 2001	
The Rockford Files	One	18 March 1975	6 October 2015	Acquired from NBC
Roger & Val Have Just Got In	Two	6 August 2010	14 March 2012	
Rome	Two	2005	2007	Co-production with HBO
Roots	One	8 April 1977	1 May 1977	Miniseries; acquired from ABC
Roots: The Next Generations	One	30 September 1979	11 November 1979	Miniseries; acquired from ABC
Rough Science	Two	2000	2005	
Roughnecks	One	16 June 1994	21 December 1995	
The Route Masters: Running London's Roads	Two	18 June 2013	2 February 2014	
The Royle Family	Two (1998); One (1999–2012)	14 September 1998	25 December 2012	
Running Blind	Scotland	10 July 1979	17 July 1979	
Russell Howard's Good News	Three (2009–13); Two (2014–15)	22 October 2009	17 December 2015	

=== S ===
Title	Channel	First Broadcast	Last Broadcast	Notes
Sacred Wonders of Britain	Two	30 December 2013	13 January 2014	
Salamander	Four	8 February 2014		
Salting the Battlefield	Two	27 March 2014		
The Sandie Shaw Supplement	One	10 September 1968	15 October 1968	
Sandylands	Two	18 September 2023	30 May 2024	Acquired from Gold
The Sarah Jane Adventures	One	1 January 2007	18 October 2011	Part of the Doctor Who franchise
The Sarah Millican Television Programme	Two	8 March 2012	22 December 2013	
SAS: Rogue Warriors	Two	6 February 2017	20 February 2017	
Saturday Playhouse	One	4 January 1958	1 April 1961	
Seven Worlds, One Planet	One	27 October 2019	8 December 2019	
Scallywagga	Three	29 April 2008	30 March 2010	
Scarborough	One	6 September 2019	11 October 2019	
Scene	Two	1968	2002	
School's Out	One	5 April 2006	1 September 2007	
Science Shack	Two	2001	2002	
Scot Squad	Scotland	27 October 2014	2 February 2023	
The Scotts	Scotland	6 January 2020 (pilot); 6 September 2021	5 December 2023	
ScreenPlay	Two	9 July 1986	27 October 1993	
ScreenPlay Firsts	Two	17 August 1987	29 September 1993	
The Sculptress	One	24 February 1996	3 March 1996	
Sea Monsters	One	9 November 2003	23 November 2003	
Sea of Souls	One	2 February 2004	19 April 2007	
Second City Firsts	Two	15 October 1973	13 May 1978	23 episodes missing
Secret Fortune	One	12 February 2011	29 December 2012	
Secret Garden	One	5 April 2026	3 May 2026	
The Secret Agent	Two	1 October 1975		
The Secret Show	Two	16 September 2006	27 October 2007	
The Secrets	One	7 September 2014	12 September 2014	
See You in Court	One	29 March 2011	17 May 2011	
Semi-Detached	Two	6 August 2010	10 September 2020	
Seven Ages of Britain	One	31 January 2010	21 March 2010	
Seven Ages of Rock	Two	19 May 2007	30 June 2007	
Seven of One	Two	25 March 1973	6 May 1973	
Sex on the Edge	Three	2016		
Sexy Beasts	Three	14 February 2014	9 September 2014	
The Shadow Line	Two	5 May 2011	16 June 2011	
Shakespeare: The Animated Tales	Two	9 November 1992	14 December 1994	
Shakespeare Unlocked	Two	2012		
Shark: Beneath the Surface	One	7 May 2015	21 May 2015	
Shaun the Sheep	Two	5 March 2007	18 November 2016	
She Loves Me	Two	13 April 1979		
Sherlock	One	25 July 2010	15 January 2017	
The Shiny Show	One	11 February 2002	30 July 2002	
The Shock of the New	Two	21 September 1980	9 November 1980	
Shoestring	One	30 September 1979	21 December 1980	
Shooting Stars	Two (1993–2011); Choice (2002)	27 December 1993	12 September 2011	
Should I Worry About...?	One	9 September 2004	18 August 2005	
Showtrial	One	31 October 2021	3 November 2024	
Show Me the Monet	Two	2011		
Shrill	Three	15 December 2019	7 May 2021	
Siblings	Three	7 August 2014	8 February 2016	
Silk	One	22 February 2011	31 March 2014	
Simon Schama's Power of Art	Two	2006		
Simon Schama's Shakespeare	Two	2012		
The Simpsons	One	23 November 1996	7 May 2004	Acquired from Fox
The Singing Detective	One	16 November 1986	21 December 1986	
The Sinner	Four	1 December 2018	11 January 2020	Acquired from USA Network; Only the first two series were broadcast on the BBC. Moved to Netflix
Sitting in Limbo	One	8 June 2020		
Six-Five Special	One	16 February 1957	27 December 1958	
Slim John	One	1969		
Small Talk	One	24 July 1994	18 December 1996	
SMart	One (1994–2006); Two (2007–08)	5 October 1994	4 April 2009	
Smiley's People	Two	20 September 1982	25 October 1982	
Sneakerhead	Two	25 July 2024	8 August 2024	Acquired from Dave
Snog Marry Avoid?	Three	23 June 2008	9 December 2013	
The Snow Wolf Family & Me	Two	2014		
The Snowdropper	Wales	29 May 1975		
Snowfall	Two	8 October 2017	13 July 2023	Acquired from FX
So Haunt Me	One	23 February 1992	6 February 1994	
So What Now?	One	26 March 2001	22 May 2001	
So You Think You Can Dance	One	2 January 2010	11 June 2011	
Softly, Softly	One	5 January 1966	13 November 1969	
Softly, Softly: Task Force	One	20 November 1969	15 December 1976	
Solo	One	11 January 1981	17 October 1982	
Some Girls	Three	6 November 2012	22 December 2014	
Some Mothers Do 'Ave 'Em	One	15 February 1973	25 December 1978	
Something Else	Two	11 March 1978	5 November 1982	
Something Special	Two	1 September 2003		
South of the Border	One	25 October 1988	22 June 1990	
South Pacific	Two	10 May 2009	14 June 2009	
South Side Story	Three	26 January 2015	2 March 2015	
Space: 1999	Two	11 May 1998	5th Jun 1999	Acquired from ITV
Space Precinct	Two	1995	2003	
Spender	One	8 January 1991	29 December 1993	
Spent	Two	1 July 2024	17 August 2024	
Spies of Warsaw	Four	9 January 2013	16 January 2013	
The Split	One	24 April 2018	30 December 2024	Co-production with Sundance TV (series 1–2) and BBC America (series 3)
Spooks	One	13 May 2002	23 October 2011	
Spooks: Code 9	Three	10 September 2008	7 October 2008	
Sports Review	BBC TV	30 April 1937	1946	
Spy in the Wild	One	12 January 2017	19 February 2020	
SS-GB	One	19 February 2017	19 March 2017	
Staged	One	10 June 2020	26 January 2021	Moved to BritBox for the third series
Stand by to Shoot	BBC TV	6 June 1953	11 July 1953	
Star Cops	Two	6 July 1987	31 August 1987	
Stars in Fast Cars	Two (2004); Three (2005–2006)	10 July 2004, 25 September 2005	20 January 2006	Part of the Top Gear franchise
Starstruck	Three	25 April 2021	11 September 2023	Co-production with HBO Max (series 1–2) and Max (series 3)
Star Trek	One	12 July 1969; 19 August 1992	15 December 1971; 19 January 1994	Acquired from NBC
Star Trek: The Animated Series	Two	31 August 1974	22 December 1974	Acquired from NBC
Star Trek: Deep Space Nine	Two	28 September 1995		Acquired from Paramount Television
Star Trek: The Next Generation	Two	26 September 1990	6 May 1992	Acquired from Paramount Television
Star Trek: Voyager	One	26 August 1996		Acquired from UPN
The Star Trek Story	One	26 August 1996		
Starlight	BBC TV	3 November 1936	1949	
State of the Union	Two	8 September 2019	23 February 2022	Acquired from Sundance TV
The State Within	One	2 November 2006	7 December 2006	
Steptoe and Son	One	7 June 1962	26 December 1974	
Still Game	One	6 September 2002	28 March 2019	
Still Open All Hours	One	26 December 2013	23 December 2019	Sequel to Open All Hours
Stingray	Two	11 September 1992	21 January 2004	Acquired from ITV
Stingray: The Reunion Party	Four	2 January 2008		
The Story of China	Two	2016		
Storyboard	BBC TV	28 July 1961	1 September 1961	
Strange	One	9 March 2002	5 July 2003	
Strangers and Brothers	Two	11 January 1984	4 April 1984	
The Street	One	13 April 2006	17 August 2009	
Streets Apart	One	24 October 1988	9 October 1989	
Stuck	Two	26 September 2022	1 November 2022	
Students on the Edge	Three	2018		
Sugartown	One	24 July 2011	7 August 2011	
Summer of Rockets	Two	22 May 2019	26 June 2019	
Sun, Sex and Suspicious Parents	Three	4 January 2011	8 July 2015	
Sunday Night Theatre	BBC TV	5 March 1950	20 December 1959	
Sunshine	One	7 October 2008	21 October 2008	
SunTrap	One	27 May 2015	1 July 2015	
Super Cute Animals	One	2015		
Super Senses: The Secret Power of Animals	Two	2014		
Super Smart Animals	One	2012		
Supergiant Animals	One	2013		
Pretty Little Liars: The Perfectionists	iPlayer	16 January 2021		Acquired from Freeform
Superman & Lois	One	10 December 2021	9 March 2025	Acquired from The CW
Supermarket Secrets	One	4 July 2013	3 April 2019	
Supernatural: The Unseen Powers of Animals	One	1999		
Supersized Earth	One	2012		
The Supersizers...	Two	20 May 2008	27 July 2009	
Survivors (1975)	One	16 April 1975	8 June 1977	
Survivors (2008)	One	23 November 2008	23 February 2010	
Swallows and Amazons Forever!	Two	14 March 1984	2 May 1984	
Sweat the Small Stuff	Three	30 April 2013	7 January 2015	
Sykes	One	14 September 1972	16 November 1979	
Sykes and a...	One	29 January 1960	16 November 1965	
Sykes and a Big, Big Show	One	26 February 1971	2 April 1971	
The Syndicate	One	27 March 2012	4 May 2021	

=== T ===
Title	Channel	First Broadcast	Last Broadcast	Notes
Taboo	One	7 January 2017	25 February 2017	Co-production with FX
Takeover Bid	One	26 May 1990	15 July 1991	
Takin' Over the Asylum	Two	27 September 1994	1 November 1994	
Tales from Soho	BBC TV	21 January 1956	25 February 1956	
Tales from the Green Valley	Two	19 August 2005	4 November 2005	First installment in the BBC historic farm series
Tales from the Palaces	Four	29 September 2005	24 November 2005	
Tales of the TARDIS	iPlayer	1 November 2023	20 June 2024	Part of the Doctor Who franchise
The Tales of Para Handy	One	31 July 1994	21 August 1995	
Tales of the Gold Monkey	One	5 November 1982	21 June 1983	Acquired from ABC
Alan Bennett's Talking Heads	One	1987	1998	
Talking to a Stranger	Two	1966		
Tatau	Three	2015		
Taxi	One	1978	1983	
Teacher Didn't Tell Me	BBC TV	1957	1957	
Telecrime	BBC TV	10 August 1938	25 July 1939	
Telecrimes	BBC TV	22 October 1946	28 November 1946	
The Telegoons	BBC TV	5 October 1963	1 August 1964	
Teletubbies	One	1997	2002	
Television Newsreel	BBC TV	5 January 1948	4 July 1954	
Tell Me Lies	One	9 January 2025	3 November 2025	Acquired from Hulu. Moved to Disney+ for series 3.
Ten Pound Poms	One	14 May 2023	13 April 2025	Co-production with Stan
Tenko	One	22 October 1981	1985	
Terry and June	One	24 October 1979	31 August 1987	
Test the Nation	One	11 May 2002	27 August 2007	
Testament: The Bible in Animation	One	16 October 1996	11 December 1996	
Thailand: Earth's Tropical Paradise	Two	2017		
That Day We Sang	Two	2014		
That Mitchell and Webb Look	Two	2006	2010	
That Puppet Game Show	One	2013	2014	
Theatre 625	Two	3 May 1964	5 August 1968	
Theatre Night	Two	15 September 1985	21 July 1990	
Theatre Parade	BBC TV	1936	1938	
There She Goes	Four (2018); Two (2020; 2023)	16 October 2018	21 June 2023	
They Think It's All Over	One	14 September 1995	9 June 2006	
The Thick of It	Four (2005–07); One (2009–2012)	19 May 2005	27 October 2012	
The Thin Blue Line	One	13 November 1995	23 November 1996	
Thirteen	Three	28 February 2016	27 March 2016	
Thirty-Minute Theatre	Two	7 October 1965	9 August 1973	241 episodes missing
This Country	Three	8 February 2017	23 March 2020	
This Life	Two	18 March 1996	7 August 1997	
This Time Tomorrow	One	5 July 2008	23 August 2008	
This Time with Alan Partridge	One	25 February 2019	4 June 2021	
Threads	One	23 September 1984		
Three Girls	One	16 May 2017	18 May 2017	
Three Men in a Boat	Two	3 January 2006	28 December 2011	
Three Up, Two Down	One	15 April 1985	18 June 1989	
Through Hell and High Water	Two	13 February 2006	17 February 2006	
Thunderbirds	Two	20 September 1991		Acquired from ITV
Till Death Us Do Part	One	1965	1975	
Time	One	6 June 2021	18 October 2026	
Time Commanders	Two (2003–05); Four (2016)	4 September 2003; 12 September 2016	13 March 2005; 27 December 2016	
The Time Machine	BBC TV	25 January 1949		
Time Trumpet	Two	3 August 2006	7 September 2006	
Timewatch	Two	29 September 1982	15 November 2011	
Tinker Tailor Soldier Spy	One	10 September 1979	22 October 1979	
Tipping the Velvet	Two	9 October 2002	23 October 2002	
To the Ends of the Earth	Two	6 July 2005	20 July 2005	
Titanic Sinks Tonight	Two	28 December 2025	31 December 2025	
To the Manor Born	One	30 September 1979	29 November 1981	
To Walk Invisible	One	29 December 2016		
Toast of Tinseltown	Two	4 January 2022	8 February 2022	Previously aired for three series on Channel 4 as Toast of London
Together	Two	17 June 2021		
Tomorrow's World	One	7 July 1965	16 July 2003	
Tonight's the Night	One	18 April 2009	3 December 2011	
Too Much TV	Two	29 February 2016	1 April 2016	
Top Cat	One	16 May 1962	1989	
Top Gear (1977)	One (1977–1978); Two (1978–2001)	22 April 1977	17 December 2001	Part of the Top Gear franchise
Top Gear America	Two	2011	2022	Part of the Top Gear franchise
Top of the Lake	Two	2013	2017	
Top of the Pops	One (1964–2005); One (2005–06)	1 January 1964	30 July 2006	
Top of the Pops 2	Two	17 September 1994	22 December 2017	
Torchwood	Three (2006–08); Two (2008); One (2009–2011)	22 October 2006	9 September 2011	Part of the Doctor Who franchise
Total Wipeout	One	2009	2012	
Totally Saturday	One	2009	2009	
Touch Me, I'm Karen Taylor	Three	2006	2008	
Tough Young Teachers	Three	2014		
The Tourist	One	1 January 2022	28 January 2024	Co-production with HBO Max (series 1), Stan and ZDF
The Tower: A Tale of Two Cities	One	2007	2008	
Traces	One	4 January 2021	4 April 2024	Acquired from Alibi
Tracey Ullman's Show	One	11 January 2016	17 March 2017	
Traffic Cops	One	2003	2015	
Trainer	One	1991	1992	
The Trap: What Happened to Our Dream of Freedom	One	2007	2007	
Trapped!	One	2007	2010	
Treasures of Ancient Rome	Four	3 September 2012	17 September 2012	
Trexx and Flipside	Three	6 July 2008	3 August 2008	
The Trials of Life	One	3 October 1990	19 December 1990	
Triangle	One	5 January 1981	6 July 1983	
Tribes, Predators & Me	Two	20 March 2016; 30 October 2023	21 September 2017; 6 November 2023	
The Trip	Two	1 November 2010	31 March 2020	
The Trick	One	18 October 2021		
Troy: Fall of a City	One	17 February 2018	7 April 2018	
Truckers	One	10 October 2013	7 November 2013	
Trust	Two	12 September	14 November 2018	Acquired from FX
Trust Me	One	8 August 2017	7 May 2019	
The Tube	Two	20 February 2012	26 March 2012	
The Tuckers	Wales	31 October 2018 (pilot); 10 January 2020	11 November 2022	
Tudor Monastery Farm	Two	13 November 2013	18 December 2013	Fifth installment of the BBC historic farm series
The Tudors	Two	5 October 2007	2010	
Tumble	One	9 August 2014	13 September 2014	
The Turkish Detective	Two	7 July 2024	29 July 2024	Acquired from Paramount+
Turks & Caicos	Two	20 March 2014		
Turn Back Time – The High Street	One	2 November 2010	7 December 2010	
Turnabout	One	26 March 1990	7 October 1996	
Two Fat Ladies	Two	9 October 1996	28 September 1999	
Two Greedy Italians	Two	4 May 2011	17 May 2012	
Two Pints of Lager and a Packet of Crisps	One (2001); Choice (2002); Three (2003–2011)	26 February 2001	24 May 2011	
The Two Ronnies	One	10 April 1971	25 December 1987	
The Two Ronnies Sketchbook	One	18 March 2005	25 December 2005	
Two Thousand Acres of Sky	One	1 January 2001	21 February 2003	
Two Tribes	Two	18 August 2014	31 August 2015	
Two Up, Two Down	One	11 May 1979	15 June 1979	
Tyger Takes On...	Three	15 May 2014	19 November 2015	

=== U ===
Title	Channel	First Broadcast	Last Broadcast	Notes
Unbeatable	One	10 May 2021		
Uncle	Three	13 January 2014	12 February 2017	
Underground Ernie	Two	5 June 2006	23 December 2006	
The Underground Murder Mystery	BBC TV	19 January 1937		
United!	One	4 October 1965	2 March 1967	
Up Pompeii!	One	30 March 1970	26 October 1970	
Up Sunday	One	16 January 1972	23 December 1973	
Up the Women	Four (2013); Two (2015)	30 May 2013	25 February 2015	
Upstairs, Downstairs	One	26 December 2010	25 March 2012	Co-production with PBS
Upstart Crow	Two	9 May 2016	21 December 2020	
Us	One	20 September	11 October 2020	

=== V ===
Title	Channel	First Broadcast	Last Broadcast	Notes
The Vampyr: A Soap Opera	Two	29 December 1992	2 January 1993	
Venice 24/7	Four	7 March 2012	11 April 2012	
The Verdict	Two	11 February 2007	15 February 2007	
Versailles	Two	1 June 2016	6 August 2018	
A Very British Airline	Two	2 June 2014	16 June 2014	
A Very British Scandal	One	26 December 2021	28 December 2021	
A Very English Scandal	One	20 May 2018	3 June 2018	
Vexed	Two	15 August 2010	5 September 2012	
The Vicar of Dibley	One	10 November 1994	23 December 2020	
Vic and Bob's Big Night Out	Two (2017); Four (2018–19)	29 December 2017 (pilot); 28 November 2018	18 March 2019	
The Victim	One	8 April 2019	11 April 2019	
Victoria Wood As Seen On TV	Two	11 January 1985	18 December 1987	
Victoria Wood's Nice Cup of Tea	One	10 April 2013	11 April 2013	
Video Nasty	Northern Ireland	8 January 2025	22 January 2025	
Vienna Blood	Two	18 November 2019	4 August 2024	Co-production with ORF 2
The Village	One	31 March 2013	14 September 2014	
Virdee	One	10 February 2025	17 March 2025	
The Virgin Queen	One	22 January 2006	12 February 2006	
Virtual Murder	One	24 July 1992	28 August 1992	
Vision On	One	6 March 1964	11 May 1976	
The Voice UK	One	24 March 2012	9 April 2016	

=== W ===
Title	Channel	First Broadcast	Last Broadcast	Notes
W1A	Two	19 March 2014	23 October 2017	
Wacky Races	One	7 October 1969	17 June 1999	
Wait Till Your Father Gets Home	One	23 December 1984	20 September 1986	
Waking the Dead	One	4 September 2000	11 April 2011	
Walking with Beasts	One	15 November 2001	21 December 2001	
Walking with Cavemen	One	27 March 2003	23 April 2003	
Walking with Dinosaurs (1999)	One	4 October 1999	8 November 1999	
Walking with Dinosaurs (2025)	One	25 May 2025	29 June 2025	
Walking with Monsters	One	5 November 2005	19 December 2005	
The Wall	One	12 October 2019	2 April 2022	
Wallace & Gromit's Cracking Contraptions	One (2002–03); Three (2009–12)	24 December 2002; 1 May 2009	23 March 2003; 10 June 2012	
Wallace & Gromit's World of Invention	One	3 November 2010	8 December 2010	
Walliams & Friend	One	24 December 2015	27 December 2016	
The Walshes	Four	13 March 2014	27 March 2014	
Walt Disney on Making a Film	One	15 October 1953		
Walt Disney's Wonderful World of Color	One	4 September 1971	2 January 1972	
Wanderlust	One	4 September 2018	9 October 2018	
War & Peace	One	3 January 2016	February 2016	
War Walks	Two	26 July 1996	19 December 1997	
Warren	One	25 February 2019	1 April 2019	
Wasp's Nest	BBC TV	18 June 1937		
The Way of the Warrior	Two	11 May 1983; 9 May 1989	29 June 1983; 20 June 1989	
Watch with Mother	One	1951	1972	
Watchdog	One	14 July 1985	17 October 2019	
Watchdog Test House	One	10 March 2014	20 March 2015	
Watermen: A Dirty Business	Two	15 April 2014	20 May 2014	
Watership Down	One	22 December 2018	23 December 2018	
Watson & Oliver	Two	20 February 2012	30 May 2013	
Way to Go	Three	17 January 2013	21 February 2013	
Ways of Seeing	Two	8 January 1972	29 January 1972	
We Are History	Two	3 April 2000	30 October 2001	
We Hunt Together	One	26 June 2023	22 July 2024	Acquired from Alibi
We Love Sitcom	One	9 September 2016		
The Wednesday Play	One	28 October 1964	27 May 1970	
West 10 LDN	Three	10 March 2008		
We've Got Your Number	One	27 February 1999	22 May 1999	
What the Ancients Did for Us	Two	16 February 2005	23 April 2008	
What Do Artists Do All Day?	Four	19 March 2013	26 August 2015	
What the Industrial Revolution Did for Us	Two	7 October 2003	11 November 2003	
What It Feels Like for a Girl	Three	3 June 2025	24 June 2025	
What Not to Wear	Two (2001–03); One (2004–07)	29 November 2001	4 October 2007	
What the Papers Say	Two	1989	2008	
What Remains	One	25 August 2013	15 September 2013	
What the Romans Did for Us	Two	6 November 2000	11 December 2000	
What the Stuarts Did for Us	Two	21 October 2002	11 November 2002	
What the Tudors Did for Us	Two	23 September 2002	14 October 2002	
What the Victorians Did for Us	Two	3 September 2001	22 October 2001	
What We Do in the Shadows	Two	19 May 2019	2 November 2021	Acquired from FX; Only the first three series were broadcast on the BBC. Moved to Disney+
Whatever Happened to the Likely Lads?	One	9 January 1973	24 December 1974	
The Witchfinder	Two	8 March 2022	12 April 2022	
White Gold	Two	28 May 2017	10 April 2019	
White Heat	Two	8 March 2012	12 April 2012	
White Van Man	Three	22 March 2012	29 March 2012	
Whites	Two	28 September 2010	2 November 2010	
The White Queen	One	16 June 2013	18 August 2013	
Whoops Baghdad	One	25 January 1973	1 March 1973	
Whose Doctor Who	Two	3 April 1977		Part of the Doctor Who franchise
Why Don't You?	One	20 August 1973	21 April 1995	
The Widow of Bath	One	1 June 1959	6 July 1959	
Wild Africa	Two	7 November 2001	12 December 2001	
Wild Arabia	Two	22 February 2013	8 March 2013	
Wild Brazil	Two	14 January 2014	16 January 2014	
Wild Burma: Nature's Lost Kingdom	Two	29 November 2013	13 December 2013	
Wild Caribbean	Two	16 January 2007	6 February 2007	
Wild China	Two	11 May 2008	15 June 2008	
Wild Down Under	Two	12 September 2003	17 October 2003	
Wild London	One	1 January 2026		
Wild Isles	One	12 March 2023	9 April 2023	
Wild in Your Garden	Two	2003		
Wild Ireland: The Edge of the World	Two	2017		
Wild New World	Two	3 October 2002	7 November 2002	
Wild Wales	One	2010		
Wild West: America's Great Frontier	Two	2016		
Wildlife on One	One	6 January 1977	17 February 2005	
Wildlife on Two	Two	1977	2005	
Wilfred	Three	16 August 2011	2015	
The Windermere Children	Two	27 January 2020		
Winning Lines	One	12 June 1999	16 October 2004	
Wipeout	One	25 May 1994	17 April 2003	
The Wire	Two	2009		
Wisting	Four	28 December 2019	5 February 2025	Acquired from Viaplay
Witness for the Prosecution	One	26 August 1985		Acquired from CBS
The Witness for the Prosecution	One	26 December 2016	27 December 2016	
Wogan	One	4 May 1982	3 July 1992	
Wolf Hall	Two (2015); One (2024)	21 January 2015	15 December 2024	
The Woman in White	One	22 April 2018	7 May 2018	
The Wombles	One	5 February 1973	24 October 1975	
The Wonderful World of Disney	One	8 April 1972	7 May 1984	
Wonders of Life	Two	27 January 2013	24 February 2013	
Wonders of the Monsoon	Two	5 October 2014	2 November 2014	
Wonders of the Solar System	Two	7 March 2010	4 April 2010	
Wonders of the Universe	Two	6 March 2011	27 March 2011	
Words and Pictures	Two	17 October 1970	28 October 2006	
Working Lunch	Two	19 September 1994	30 July 2010	
The World About Us	Two	3 December 1967	20 July 1986	
The World of Walt Disney	One	25 December 1961		
World On Fire	One	29 September 2019	20 August 2023	
World Series of Dating	Three	26 March 2012	8 May 2012	
World Theatre	One	5 May 1959	11 August 1959	
World Tour of Scotland	One	12 July 1994	23 October 1995	
World's Craziest Fools	Three	6 June 2011	11 March 2013	
World's Most Dangerous Roads	Two	4 September 2011	9 January 2013	
World's Sneakiest Animals	Two	25 December 2015; 31 July 2023	14 January 2016; 8 August 2023	
The World's Strictest Parents	Three	1 September 2008	15 December 2011	
World's Weirdest Events	Two	3 September 2015	20 March 2016	
The Worst Week of My Life	One	12 March 2004	22 December 2006	
Worzel Gummidge	One	26 December 2019	29 December 2021	
WPC 56	One	18 March 2013	13 March 2015	
Wreck	Three	9 October 2022	10 April 2024	
Wright Around the World	One	25 October 2003	8 January 2005	
The Wright Way	One	23 April 2013	28 May 2013	
The Wrong Door	Three	28 August 2008	2 October 2008	
The Wrong Mans	Two	24 September 2013	23 December 2014	

=== X ===
Title	Channel	First Broadcast	Last Broadcast	Notes
X Change	One (2000–01); Two (2001–04)	24 July 2000	31 March 2006	
The X-Files	Two	19 September 1994	20 March 2004	Acquired from Fox

=== Y ===
Title	Channel	First Broadcast	Last Broadcast	Notes
A Year in the Life of a Year	Four	30 December 2016	30 December 2017	
Years and Years	One	14 May 2019	18 June 2019	Co-production with HBO
Yellowstone	Two	15 March 2009	29 March 2009	
Yellowstone: Wildest Winter to Blazing Summer	Two	3 January 2017	5 January 2017	
Yes Minister	Two	25 February 1980	17 December 1984	
Yes, Prime Minister	Two	9 January 1986	28 January 1988	
You Know What People Are	One	1 June 1955	6 July 1955	
You Rang, M'Lord?	One	29 December 1988	24 April 1993	
Young, Dumb and Living Off Mum	Three	19 July 2009	18 September 2011	
The Young Indiana Jones Chronicles	One (1994–95; 2002–05); Two (1995–2002)	20 November 1994	24 April 2005	Acquired from ABC
The Young Ones	Two	9 November 1982	19 June 1984	
Your Life in Their Hands	One (1958–64; 79–87; 2004–05); Two (1991)	11 February 1958	8 November 2005	
Your Wardrobe	One	5 April 1949	21 Dec 1950	

=== Z ===
Title	Channel	First Broadcast	Last Broadcast	Notes
Z-Cars	One	2 January 1962	20 September 1978	
Zen	One	2 January 2011	16 January 2011	
Zoo Quest	One	21 December 1954	31 May 1963	

=== Miniseries ===
Title	Channel	First Broadcast	Notes
Gold Digger	One	12 November – 17 December 2019	
The War of the Worlds	One	17 November – 1 December 2019	
A Christmas Carol	One	22 – 24 December 2019	Co-production with FX
The Trial of Christine Keeler	One	29 December 2019 – 26 January 2020	
Dracula	One	1 – 3 January 2020	Co-production with Netflix
The Pale Horse	One	9 – 16 February 2020	Co-production with Amazon Prime Video
Trigonometry	Two	15 March – 26 April 2020	
My Left Nut	One	24 March – 7 April 2020	
Devs	Two	15 April – 7 May 2020	Acquired from Hulu
Normal People	Three	26 April – 31 May 2020	Co-production with Hulu
I May Destroy You	One	8 June – 14 July 2020	Co-production with HBO
The Salisbury Poisonings	One	14 – 16 June 2020	
The Luminaries	One	21 June – 6 July 2020	Co-production with TVNZ 1
Mrs. America	Two	8 – 30 July 2020	Acquired from Hulu
The Last Wave	Four	25 July – 8 August 2020	Acquired from France 2
A Suitable Boy	One	26 July – 30 August 2020	
Small Axe	One	15 November – 13 December 2020	Co-production with Amazon Prime Video
Black Narcissus	One	27 December 2020 – 10 January 2021	Co-production with FX
The Serpent	One	1 January – 14 February 2021	Co-production with Netflix
A Teacher	Two	3 – 7 February 2021	Acquired from Hulu
The Pursuit of Love	One	9 – 23 May 2021	
Three Families	One	10 – 11 May 2021	
The North Water	Two	10 September – 8 October 2021	Co-production with CBC and Super Channel
Ridley Road	One	3 – 24 October 2021	Co-production with PBS
You Don't Know Me	One	5 – 13 December 2021	Co-production with Netflix
The Girl Before	One	19 – 22 December 2021	Co-production with HBO Max
Four Lives	One	3 – 5 January 2022	
Rules of the Game	One	11 – 19 January 2022	
Chloe	One	6 – 21 February 2022	Co-production with Amazon Prime Video
This is Going to Hurt	One	8 February – 22 March 2022	Co-production with AMC+
Mood	Three	1 March – 6 April 2022	
Life After Life	Two	19 April – 10 May 2022	
Conversations with Friends	Three	15 May – 7 June 2022	Co-production with Hulu and RTÉ One
Red Rose	Three	15 August – 6 September 2022	Co-production with Netflix
Crossfire	One	20 – 22 September 2022	
Inside Man	One	26 September – 4 October 2022	Co-production with Netflix
The English	Two	10 November – 15 December 2022	Co-production with Amazon Prime Video
Mayflies	One	27 – 28 December 2022	
Great Expectations	One	26 March – 30 April 2023	Co-production with FX on Hulu
Steeltown Murders	One	15 May – 5 June 2023	
The Gallows Pole	Two	31 May – 14 June 2023	
Best Interests	One	12 – 20 June 2023	
The Sixth Commandment	One	17 – 25 July 2023	
Clean Sweep	Four	29 July – 12 August 2023	Acquired from RTÉ One
Wolf	One	31 July – 15 August 2023	
The Woman in the Wall	One	27 August – 24 September 2023	
Bad Behaviour	Three	4 – 25 September 2023	Acquired from Stan
Boiling Point	One	1 – 22 October 2023	
The Reckoning	One	9 – 17 October 2023	
Boat Story	One	19 November – 4 December 2023	Co-production with Amazon Freevee
Murder Is Easy	One	27 – 28 December 2023	Co-production with BritBox
The Way	One	19 February – 4 March 2024	
Newark, Newark	Two	5 – 19 March 2024	Acquired from Gold
The Dropout	One	19 March – 9 April 2024	Acquired from Hulu
This Town	One	31 March – 28 April 2024	
Dopesick	Two	28 April – 19 May 2024	Acquired from Hulu
Spy/Master	Four	4 – 18 May 2024	Acquired from Max
Lost Boys and Fairies	One	3 – 17 June 2024	
The Jetty	One	15 – 22 July 2024	
Kidnapped: The Chloe Ayling Story	Three	14 – 28 August 2024	
Dead and Buried	Northern Ireland	2 – 23 September 2024	
Moonflower Murders	One	16 November – 14 December 2024	
The Listeners	One	19 November – 10 December 2024	
Miss Austen	One	2 – 23 February 2025	Co-production with PBS
Towards Zero	One	2 – 16 March 2025	
Reunion	One	7 – 15 April 2025	
Families like Ours	Four	3 – 24 May 2025	Acquired from TV 2
The Bombing of Pan Am 103	One	18 May – 2 June 2025	Co-production with Netflix
The Last Anniversary	One	24 May – 7 June 2025	Acquired from Binge
The Black Forest Murders	Four	31 May – 7 June 2025	Acquired from Das Erste
Ragdoll	One	16 – 30 June 2025	Acquired from Alibi
Mix Tape	Two	15 – 18 July 2025	Acquired from Binge
The Narrow Road to the Deep North	One	20 July – 17 August 2025	Acquired from Amazon Prime Video
King & Conqueror	One	24 August – 5 October 2025	
The Guest	One	1 – 22 September 2025	
Nine Bodies in a Mexican Morgue	One	27 September – 1 November 2025	Acquired from MGM+
The Intruder	Four	11 – 18 October 2025	Acquired from France Télévisions
Prisoner 951	One	23 November – 1 December 2025	
The War Between the Land and the Sea	One	7 – 21 December 2025	Co-production with Disney+. Part of the Doctor Who franchise.
Waiting for the Out	One	3 January – 7 February 2026	
Lord of the Flies	One	8 February – 1 March 2026	Co-production with Stan
Babies	One	30 March – 14 April 2026	
Twenty Twenty Six	Two	8 April – 13 May 2026	
The Cage	One	26 April – 18 May 2026	
Half Man	One	28 April – 2 June 2026	Co-production with HBO
Dear England	One	24 May – 1 June 2026	
Two Weeks in August	One	23 May 2026	27 June 2026
Goolagong	Four	20 – 27 June 2026	Acquired from ABC
The Rapture	One	26 July – 9 August 2026	
Marble Hall Murders	One	26 September – 31 October 2026	Co-production with PBS

=== Documentaries ===
Title	Channel	First Broadcast	Notes
Under the Sun		1989 – 2000	
Child of Our Time	One	23 February 2000 – 11 March 2020	
Imagine...	One	11 June 2003 – 8 June 2025	
This World	Two & World News	4 January 2004 – present	
Nature's Weirdest Events	Two	3 January 2012 – 8 May 2017	
Brian Pern	Two & Four	2014 – 2017	
The Met: Policing London	One	8 June 2015 – 28 November 2023	
Immortal Egypt	Two	4 – 25 January 2016	Also known as The Story of Egypt
Civilisations	Two	1 March 2018	
Once Upon a Time in Iraq	Two	13 July – 10 August 2020	
The Kemps: All True	Two	2020	

=== Gameshows ===
Title	Channel	First Broadcast	Notes
Flog It!	Two	27 May 2002 – 4 May 2020	
Flog It!	One (2013–2020)	27 May 2002 – 4 May 2020	
Eggheads	One	10 November 2003 – 28 October 2004	
Eggheads	Two	23 May 2005 – 6 May 2019	
Decimate	One	20 April 2015 – 28 October 2016	
Think Tank	One	21 March – 16 December 2016	
The Code	One	18 April 2016 – 21 April 2017	
Debatable	Two	22 August 2016 – 2 June 2017	
Impossible	One	2 January 2017 – 23 April 2021	
The Boss	One	24 April – 13 October 2017	
Letterbox	Two	17 July 2017 – 8 November 2018	
Hardball	One	14 May – 8 June 2018	
Chase the Case	One	17 September – 12 October 2018	
I'll Get This	Two	6 November 2018 – 12 May 2020	
Catchpoint	One	23 March 2019 – 25 June 2022	
Head Hunters	One	7 October – 15 November 2019	
The Wall	One	12 October 2019 – 2 April 2022	
Take Off with Bradley & Holly	One	24 December 2019	
Take Off with Bradley & Holly	One	24 July – 14 August 2021	
Gordon Ramsay's Bank Balance	One	24 February – 14 March 2021	
I Can See Your Voice	One	10 April 2021 – 24 December 2022	
Unbeatable	One	10 May 2021 – 12 May 2023	

=== Sports programmes ===
- Live England Test Cricket: BBC TV 1938 – 1998
- Grandstand: BBC One 1958 – 2007, BBC Two 1981 – 2007
- UEFA European Championship: BBC One 1960 – present (shared with ITV Sport)
- Sportsnight: BBC One 1968 – 1997
- The Grand Prix: BBC One & BBC Two 1976 – 1996; BBC Three 2009 – 2015 (Rebroadcast between 2009 – 2015 on BBC Red Button and BBC iPlayer)
- Formula 1: BBC One, BBC Two & BBC Three 1976 – 1996 & 2009 – 2015 (rights transferred to Channel 4)
- BDO World Darts Championship: BBC One & BBC Two 1978 – 2016
- Today at Wimbledon: BBC Two 1993 – 2014 & 2016 – present (replaced by Wimbledon 2Day in 2015)
- Super Bowl (BBC One Two 2007 – 2013 & 2016 – 2022)
- Football League/League Cup Show: BBC One 2009 – 2015 (rights transferred to Channel 5)

== See also ==
- List of programs broadcast by BBC America
- List of programs broadcast by BBC Canada
- BBC television drama
- List of television programs
  - Lists of animated television series
  - List of British TV shows remade for the American market
  - List of BBC children's television programmes
  - List of BBC sitcoms
  - List of comedy television series
  - List of international game shows
  - List of sci-fi television programs
  - List of television spin-offs
