= Pathways of Belief =

Pathways of Belief is an educational British television series that shows viewers what people do in certain religions. It aired on BBC2 between 1996 and 2007. It ran for 6 series. The religions covered were Christianity, Sikhism, Islam, Hinduism, Buddhism and Judaism.

== Episodes ==
Series One 1996

1. Christianity 1 7 October 1996
2. Christianity 2 14 October 1996
3. Christianity 3 21 October 1996
4. Christianity 4 28 October 1996
5. Christianity 5 4 November 1996
6. Christianity 6 11 November 1996

Series Two 1997

1. Sikhism 1 3 October 1997
2. Sikhism 2 10 October 1997
3. Sikhism 3 17 October 1997
4. Sikhism 4 24 October 1997
5. Sikhism 5 31 October 1997
6. Sikhism 6 7 November 1997

Series Three 1998

1. Islam 1 5 October 1998
2. Islam 2 12 October 1998
3. Islam 3 19 October 1998
4. Islam 4 26 October 1998
5. Islam 5 2 November 1998
6. Islam 6 9 November 1998
