= Human, All Too Human (TV series) =

- Opening titles
- Genre: Documentary
- Directed by: Simon Chu, Jeff Morgan and Louise Wardle
- Voices of: Clive Merrison
- Narrated by: Haydn Gwynne
- Country of origin: United Kingdom
- Original language: English
- No. of series: 1
- No. of episodes: 3

Production
- Executive producers: Simon Chu, Jeff Morgan and Louise Wardle
- Producer: Celia Z. Bargh
- Production locations: France, Germany, United Kingdom
- Cinematography: Patrick Duval and Douglas Hartington
- Editor: Michael Poole
- Camera setup: Multi-camera
- Running time: 50 minutes
- Production companies: BBC and RM Arts

Original release
- Network: BBC Two
- Release: 9 August – 11 August 1999

Human, All Too Human is a three-part 1999 documentary television series co-produced by the BBC and RM Arts. It follows the lives of three prominent European philosophers: Friedrich Nietzsche, Martin Heidegger and Jean-Paul Sartre. The theme revolves heavily around the school of philosophical thought known as Existentialism, although the term had not been coined at the time of Nietzsche's writing and Heidegger declaimed the label.

The documentary is named after the 1878 book written by Nietzsche, titled Human, All Too Human: A Book for Free Spirits (in German: Menschliches, Allzumenschliches: Ein Buch für freie Geister).

== Episodes ==
Each episode runs at 50 minutes, for a total length of almost two hours and a half.

- Episode 1: Beyond Good and Evil describes the life of Friedrich Nietzsche and his gradual shift from religion to nihilism, and finally, to insanity. Towards the end of his life, his sister Elizabeth is depicted as a Nazi sympathizer who took advantage of his mental condition by falsifying his works and letters and attempted to portray him as proto-Fascist thinker.
- Episode 2: Thinking the Unthinkable centers around Martin Heidegger, who developed ideas from the writings and ideas of Nietzsche in an attempt to better understand individual human freedom. Before and after the reign of the Nazis in Germany, Heidegger spent much of his time living in solitude in the hill of Todtnauberg to allow himself to clear his mind and better focus on his own philosophy. Due to the fact that he was a member of the Nazi Party from 1933 until the end of World War II, his works were dismissed by his critics as Nazi propaganda.
- Episode 3: The Road to Freedom describes the life of the French philosopher, Jean-Paul Sartre. This is when the term existentialism begins to enter the realm of philosophy. The documentary shows that Sartre believes it is up to each individual human being to give their own life a meaning and a purpose.
