= Misbehaving Mums To Be =

- Directed by: Martha Constable
- Starring: Juliet, Heather, Kayley, Amy, Sarah, Sophie, Carrie, Tiffany, Chelsey, Litala, Laura, Victoria, Ceri-Anne, Zara.
- Narrated by: Jaime Winstone
- Country of origin: United Kingdom
- Original language: English
- No. of episodes: 7

Production
- Producer: Martha Constable
- Camera setup: Single camera
- Running time: 60 minutes

Original release
- Network: BBC Three
- Release: 14 April – 10 June 2011

Misbehaving Mums To Be is a BBC Three series following a team of midwives as they take pregnant women who binge drink, chain smoke, and overeat and help them get back into shape before they give birth.

== List of Episodes ==
| Episode # | Original Air Date | Synopsis |
|---|---|---|
| 1 | 14 Apr 2011 | Bar owner Juliet is struggling to cut down from her normal four bottles of wine a day and needs urgent help to find other ways of dealing with the stress of running her own business. 20-a-day smoker Heather smoked all the way through her first pregnancy and doesn't see why she should stop for baby number two. Chip-loving Kayley is seven stone overweight, but is not convinced she needs to change her eating habits just because there's a baby on board. |
| 2 | 21 Apr 2011 | Teenager Natalie is expecting twins, and now six months pregnant she is drastically undereating and is relying on a diet of mainly toast and supplement pills to keep off the weight. From one extreme to the other, overweight Kimberly is five months pregnant and is living off a diet of junk food and takeaways. 19-year-old Charlie is five months pregnant and smoking 20 cigarettes a day, and is completely unaware of the harm she is causing her unborn baby |
| 3 | 27 Apr 2011 | Amy is nearly five months pregnant, but smokes 15 cigarettes a day. She is surrounded by other smokers and is struggling to find the motivation to quit. Sophie is growing a baby on a diet of pizza, burgers and ice-cream, while teen mum Sarah is only a month away from giving birth but still smoking 20 a day. |
| 4 | 5 May 2011 | Carrie is smoking 20 cigarettes a day and despite being three months pregnant she's convinced there's nothing wrong with her habit. Seven months pregnant, Tiffany eats a nutrition free diet of pizza, kebab and two litres of fizzy drinks a day, with not a piece of fruit in sight. Teen parents-to-be Sarah and Stewart know their smoking is bad for their baby but still haven't found the willpower, six months into pregnancy, to stub out the fags for good. |
| 5 | 19 May 2011 | 20-a-day smoker Chelsy finds it hard to believe smoking is bad for her baby since she smoked through her first pregnancy five years ago and everything was fine - but will she be so lucky again? Litala is eight weeks away from her due date and has a serious problem with portion control. Stressed-out Laura is struggling to get her head around pregnancy a second time, and is worrying that her stress could be causing the baby damage. |
| 6 | 26 May 2011 | Victoria works 60 hours a week, despite being five months pregnant, while Ceri-Anne is seven months pregnant and still smoking ten cigarettes a day despite also being asthmatic. Meanwhile, pregnant teen Zara is surviving on fried chicken and frozen ready meals with barely a vegetable in sight. |
| 7 | 02 Jun 2011 | Catch-up on the series in which eighteen unhealthy pregnant women were challenged to give up their mischievous ways for the sake of their unborn babies. Midwife Lisa returns to visit the women who were binge drinking, chain smoking and overeating their way through pregnancy. Five of the women look back on the highs and the lows of their pregnancies and the efforts they made to change. Workaholic Juliet was highly stressed, young mums Zara and Kayley were eating too much junk food, and Amy and Ceri-Anne were puffing their way through nicotine-hazed pregnancies. Having given birth, were their babies healthy and were these women in shape for the most important event of their lives? Lisa finds out which of these mischievous mums have quit their damaging ways for good and she takes on the challenge of getting the ones who have wobbled back on track, for the sake of their new born babies. For the new mums the experience has been a life-changing one - both for them and for their children. |
