= Mechannibals =

British television series

Mechannibals is a television game show aired on the British television channel BBC Two in 2005. It was made by the independent production company IWC Media. The host was Louise Brady.

The show was sometimes likened to Channel 4's Scrapheap Challenge or the earlier BBC series The Great Egg Race, it centres on taking two families from the same area and setting them a task to create some form of machine. The contestant families were required to create it using only parts found in their home. Machines created include a shed destroyer, a beer chiller and a food cooking and preparing machine. The finished creations were then judged by people who have some knowledge about the subject. The winning family is then given enough money to replace all their used equipment with top-of-the-range alternatives. The other family, however, was left merely with a toolbox.
