= Your Wardrobe =

British TV fashion series (1949–1950)

Your Wardrobe is a British television series which aired from 1949 to 1950. While there are virtually no references to the series online, it is notable as an early example of a fashion television series, and an early example of a BBC television programme aired at women. Featuring Margot Lovell and Mary Malcolm, topics varied in the series. Some episodes reflected the affluent nature of early TV set owners, such as an episode which looked into fur coats, while other episodes reflected the austerity of post-war-Britain, with a series of segments on inexpensive clothes which aired for several weeks in 1950.

It is unlikely that any of the episodes still exist, as the BBC rarely telerecorded shows prior to the mid-1950s.

Other early fashion television series included American series And Everything Nice (1949-1950), Fashions on Parade (1948-1949), Hair Fashions (1932), along with British series Clothes-Line (1937), and Vanity Fair (1939).
