= Match of the Day from Northern Ireland =

Match of the Day from Northern Ireland is a television broadcast of football matches involving local teams in Northern Ireland and the Northern Ireland national football team, produced and broadcast by BBC Northern Ireland. It is shown on either BBC One Northern Ireland or BBC Two Northern Ireland depending on the match and availability in the schedule, while some of Northern Ireland's international matches have been also broadcast throughout the United Kingdom via the BBC Red Button interactive channels on Freeview and Sky Digital.

== History ==
The programme was first broadcast in the 1980s, when BBC NI took over international football from UTV which used to show highlights, with the matches on BBC NI focusing more on live action and highlights than UTV's broadcasts. The coverage was hosted by BBC NI sports presenters including John Bennett, and commentary was often done by Mark Robson. Jackie Fullerton was the main commentator in 1993, when he moved to BBC NI from UTV, with Mark Robson going in the opposite direction.

Coverage declined in the 2008/2009 season with Northern Ireland's home games moving to Sky Sports, who bought the rights in 2008, and away games to Setanta Sports. In the 2008 season the program was limited to highlights of all Northern Ireland games, with home highlights shown on the night of the game and away highlights on the night after the game, due to rights restrictions. The only Northern Ireland match in this season shown live on MOTD from NI was Northern Ireland's 3-0 win over San Marino. MOTD from NI also covers the Irish League Cup (since 2006), the Irish Cup Finals (live since 2000), and the Milk Cup finals (since 2005).
