= Five to Eleven =

- Country of origin: United Kingdom
- Original language: English

Original release
- Network: BBC 1
- Release: 27 October 1986 – 27 July 1990

Five to Eleven is a children's television programme on BBC 1 which ran between 27 October 1986 and 27 July 1990. Different celebrities of the day presented poems or short readings in a simple format. The programme was screened at 10:55 am each weekday morning, which explains the title. Each episode was four minutes in length. The series was introduced when BBC1 introduced daytime scheduling in October 1986, due to an unforeseen gap in the schedule after the 11:45 am news bulletin finished.

The most common presenter between 1986 and 1989 was Joss Ackland. Other celebrity hosts included Richard Briers, Philip Madoc, Amanda Redman, Annette Crosbie, Judi Dench, Patricia Routledge, Emma Thompson, Joanna Lumley and Laurence Olivier (in a Christmas special on 24 December 1987).

Essentially a variation on Jackanory, Five To Eleven was set in small studio which featured "dying" floral arrangements and a sea-green background. The opening titles and end "credits" (there were only three, shown in one take) featured a mid-tempo theme tune of panpipes and flutes.

In late 1989, the programme underwent some cosmetic changes, being given a new, more contemporary synthesised theme tune and a new set of titles/credits; the sea-green background and floral arrangements were dropped in favour of a scarlet set with a gold backcloth, and the celebrity presenters were dropped and replaced with children of school age. This new format proved less popular with the audience, and in 1990 Five To Eleven was cancelled due to falling viewing figures.
