= Pianos I Have Known =

1958 British TV series

Pianos I Have Known is a 15-minute British television programme which aired on the BBC during 1958 for a total of three episodes. It was among a number of programmes aired which featured piano teacher and broadcaster Sidney Harrison.

== Episode list ==
- Piano with Candles (28 January 1958)
- Piano in the Pit (11 February 1958)
- Concert Grand (25 February 1958)
