= Kitty Clive (TV play) =

Television play by the BBC

- Genre: Biography; Comedy; Drama; Family; Historical drama
- Based on: Kitty Clive
- Written by: Estelle Holt
- Starring: Denise Hurst; Faith Brook; Jill Balcon; John Van Eyssen; William Mervyn; Peter Sallis; Pauline Winter; Peter Augustine
- Country of origin: United Kingdom

Production
- Producer: Naomi Capon
- Running time: 29 Minutes
- Production company: BBC

Original release
- Network: BBC Television
- Release: 27 March 1956

Kitty Clive was a 1956 British TV play starring Denise Hurst as the titled main character Kitty Clive an 18th century actress. The movie was produced by the BBC and broadcast on 27 March 1956 on BBC Television. The movie was based on the real life 18th century actress Catherine Raftor also known as Kitty Clive, but it tells a story from her as a young aged girl on when she first performed on stage and how she became an actress.

== Plot ==
Set in the 18th century in the UK a young aged girl named Kitty Clive who lives with Mrs. Rodgers works as a servant girl for her until one day she wants to perform in the stage show "The Boy Friend" at the Wyndham's Theatre and do dancing because she thinks this her opportunity to become an actress, mainly with John Hall and Colley Cibber who are also going to be performing in it. John Hall and Robert Wilks think it's a good idea, but Mrs. Rodgers doesn't think it's a good idea. After some thinking Mrs. Rodgers eventually decides to let her perform in it. Kitty Clive ends up making the show such a success. After hearing amazing feedback from the audiences and critics, other theatre companies want to have her perform for there stage shows that there doing as well. Kitty Clive finally gets to do the job that she's always wanted to do and become an actress. After several months have gone by she has been able to continue doing acting and getting more roles in musicals.

== Cast ==
- Denise Hurst as Kitty Clive
- Faith Brook as Nance Oldfield
- Jill Balcon as Mrs. Rogers
- John Van Eyssen as Robert Wilks
- William Mervyn as Colley Cibber
- Peter Sallis as John Hall
- Pauline Winter as Miss Knowles
- Peter Augustine as a Playgoer

== Reception ==
When the play was first shown on BBC Television on 27 March 1956, it was broadcast immediately after the series DisneyLand has just been broadcast. The movie was later rebroadcast on 24 April 1956 almost a month after it was first broadcast. During its second broadcast on television the movie was shown just after the Association Football television documentary about a Saturday's School-boy International match of England v. Scotland. The play was able to survive in the BBC Archives and exist as a 35 monochrome film telerecorded from a 405/625 line videotape. The Play is fully available for public viewing at the British Film Institute. The play has also been made available for students and teachers on the online website the "Educational Recording Agency", mainly because the movie has a Curriculum Connection about Sociology.

=== Critical response ===
The Norwich Evening News liked the play and said that it's worth a repeat.
