= Josephine Terry's Kitchen =

British TV cooking series (1946–1947)

Josephine Terry's Kitchen is a British cooking advice television show which aired from 1946 to 1947 on the BBC.

One episode was about making New England cookies, another episode was about home-made sweets for Christmas, while another episode was about dishes for a children's party.

None of the episodes still exist, as the series aired live, and methods to record live television did not exist until late 1947, and were used very rarely by the BBC until around 1953–1955.
