= The Snowdropper =

1975 English TV series

- Genre: Thriller
- Created by: Alun Richards
- Based on: The Snowdropper (play)
- Written by: Alun Richards
- Directed by: George P. Owen,
- Starring: Fiona Walker; Peter Sallis; Peter Vaughan; Glyn Welden
- Country of origin: United Kingdom

Production
- Producer: George P. Owen
- Running time: 79 minutes
- Production company: BBC

Original release
- Network: BBC One Wales
- Release: 29 May 1975

The Snowdropper is a 1975 TV play starring Fiona Walker, Peter Sallis, Peter Vaughan and Glyn Welden. The play is set in Wales and centres around an escaped convict who takes refuge in a remote cottage. It was made by the BBC, produced in colour and screened on 29 May 1975.

== Plot ==
An escaped convict named Spicer takes refuge in a remote cottage in Wales. There, he meets a woman named Beulah, who Spicer ask to find a place for him to hide out. Beulah decides to help, and slowly starts to enjoy his company. A Sergeant arrives at Beulah's cottage who has come to see how she's coping with her mental health problems. He then decides to make her test her shooting skills through a rifle to get Beulah to control her mental issues. After the Sergeant leaves, Beulah decides she wants to get on with Spicer in the bed. Later that day, Beulah tells Spicer to leave as she feels like it's best for herself. The next day, Beulah tries practicing with a rifle, but she accidentally pulls the trigger when Spicer, sneaking back into her house, scares her. Sergeant storms into the cottage and starts asking Spicer where he came from. Spicer lies to the police, saying that he has never seen Beulah and that he arrived just before the shooting. Sergeant tells his police friend the Constable to take Spicer outside. Sergeant decides he's had enough of Beulah and her not listening on how to improve as a person. He then shoots Beulah with the rifle as he's had enough of her and tells his Constable friend that she shot herself.

== Cast ==
- Fiona Walker as Beulah
- Peter Sallis as Spicer
- Peter Vaughan as Sergeant
- Glyn Welden as Constable

== Production ==
The whole movie was filmed on one massive set, the inside of a cottage. The full set was designed by Julian Williams. The set built for the movie was filmed at the Aberystwyth Arts Centre. The movie took 5 days to film from 20 to 24 May 1975.

== Reception ==
The movie was first broadcast on 29 May 1975 on BBC One Wales and it was later rebroadcast again on 28 February 1977 on BBC One Wales. The movie has never been released on VHS or DVD, although the movie is available to watch on Rarefilmm. The movie is also available to watch on various other film websites as well.
