= ARTnews =

American art magazine

- Screenshot of the website in December 2024
- Editor: Sarah Douglas
- Categories: Visual arts
- Founder: James Clarence Hyde
- First issue: 1902; 124 years ago (as Hydes Weekly Art News)
- Company: Penske Media Corporation
- Country: United States
- Based in: New York City, New York
- Language: English
- Website: artnews.com
- ISSN: 0004-3273
- OCLC: 2392716

ARTnews is an American online arts magazine based in New York City, formerly issued in print. Founded in 1902 and now the oldest art publication in the world, it covers visual arts from ancient to contemporary times. The publication includes news dispatches from correspondents, investigative reports, exhibition reviews, and profiles of artists and art collectors. Originally a print magazine issued at varying frequencies throughout its history, ARTnews transitioned to a digital publication and ceased its monthly and quarterly print issues in the 2010s and 2020s after a series of ownership changes that included merging with the magazine Art in America.

== History and operations ==
=== 1902–1936: Founding and early history ===
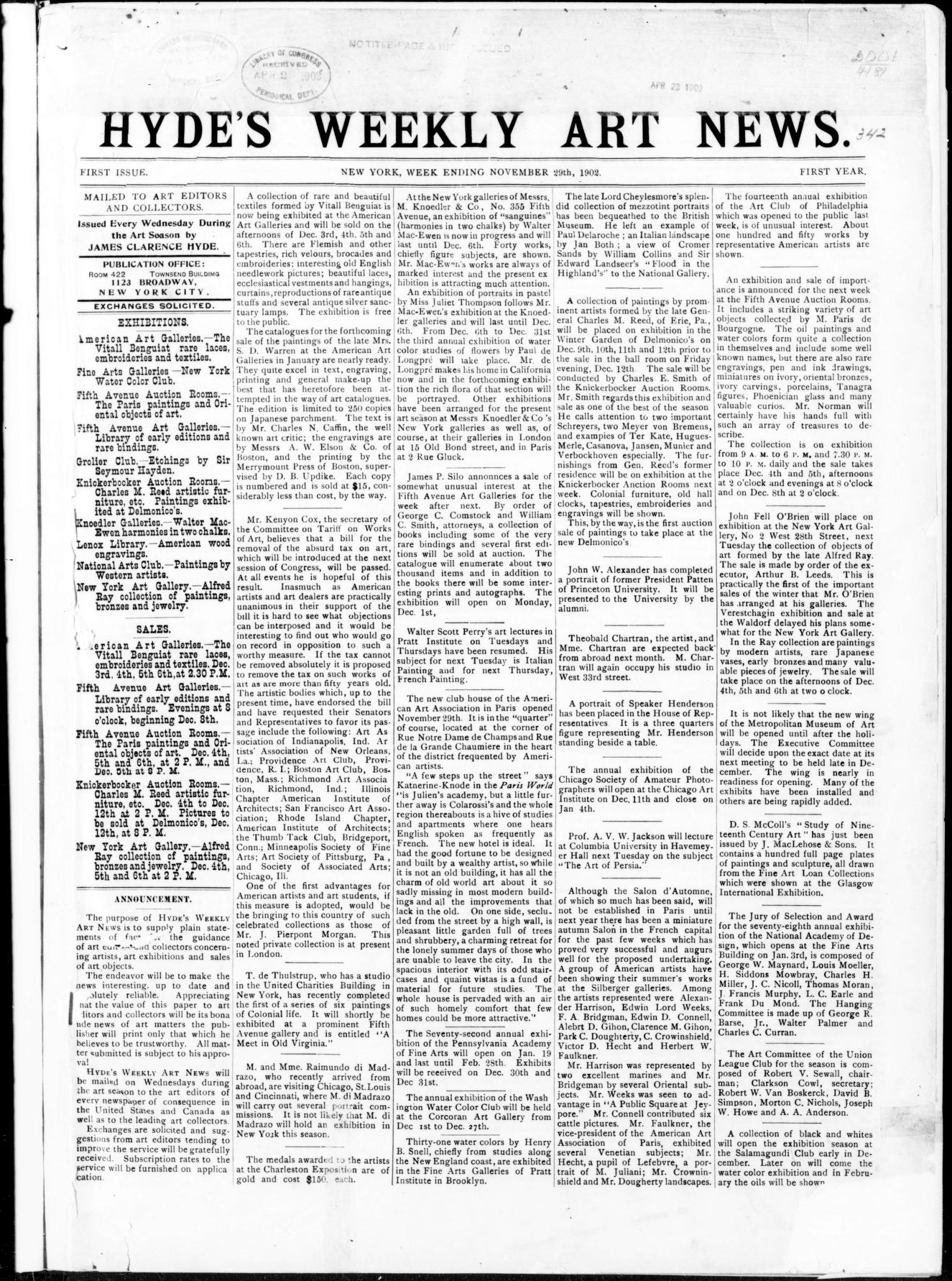
First issue (week ending November 29, 1902)

The magazine was founded in New York City by James Clarence Hyde in 1902 as Hyde's Weekly Art News, a single–sheet publication issued weekly, covering news about artists, galleries, museums, and the policies impacting them. Hyde had previously worked as a culture reporter for The New York Herald. In its early years, the magazine was primarily a trade publication for the art industry. Hyde renamed the magazine American Art News in November 1904 and expanded it to include multiple pages and illustrations, publishing weekly during the art season between November and May. The same year, James Bliss Townsend, a former art critic at the Herald, purchased the magazine from Hyde and became editor. As editor, Townsend had generally conservative tastes and disliked modern or avant-garde art, but he softened his stance toward the end of his time leading the magazine.

Townsend died suddenly in 1921 and the magazine was sold to Samuel W. Frankel, a former Herald staffer who had left the paper to start an art-focused advertising agency, and Peyton Boswell, a critic who previously wrote for the Herald and other publications. The magazine was renamed The Art News in 1923. Boswell left the publication in 1925. The following year, the magazine began publishing The Art News Annual, an annual special issue. Frankel had a nervous breakdown and developed pneumonia that caused his death in 1935; his widow and son temporarily took charge of the magazine after his death.

=== 1936–1972: Frankfurter and Hess eras, Newsweek ownership ===
Alfred M. Frankfurter purchased the magazine in 1936, becoming editor of the publication and president of its publisher Art Foundation Press. Frankfurter's ownership stake in the company eventually totaled around 80 percent of the shares. The magazine was renamed ART News in 1941, the same year it switched from weekly to a twice monthly schedule. Frankfurter introduced a quarterly magazine titled Portfolio as a companion to The Art News Annual, covering additional art forms beyond visual art.

Thomas B. Hess joined the magazine in 1946 as an editorial associate before becoming executive editor under Frankfurter in 1949. Both Frankfurter and Hess focused the magazine on exhibition reviews and longer, critical essays on art. Hess in particular became known for championing abstract expressionism, action painting, and the New York School of artists, including Jackson Pollock, Willem de Kooning, and Franz Kline. ART News absorbed the publication Magazine of Art in 1953, which had prior been published by the American Federation of Arts.

In 1962, Frankfurter sold Art Foundation Press to The Washington Post Company, which housed ART News and Portfolio in its magazine division under Newsweek. Frankfurter remained editor until his death in 1965 and was succeeded in the role by Hess. The magazine's name was shortened again in 1969 to ARTnews, which remains its current title.

=== 1972–2014: Milton Esterow ownership ===
In the early 1970s, the magazine was struggling financially and had a relatively small circulation around 33,000. Milton Esterow, a former art reporter for The New York Times, led a group of investors to purchase ARTnews in 1972 from Newsweek under a new corporate entity, ARTnews Associates, with Esterow becoming the publisher and editor. Having previously done extensive investigative reporting for the Times culminating in a book on art stolen by Nazis during World War II, Esterow sought to bring a more news-oriented journalistic approach to the magazine, expanding its coverage beyond art reviews and criticism to include art world news and reporting, similar to the original weekly publication. He told the Times that he believed the art world was "underreported" and needed more journalistic coverage, though he continued to publish art and exhibition reviews. Writing five years after Esterow took control of the magazine, critic Hilton Kramer said "There has been an increase in news and a distinct lowering of the intellectual temperature." ARTnews Associates launched Antiques World in 1978, a monthly sister magazine focused primarily on the antiques trade. By 1979, the circulation of ARTnews had risen to 68,000, moving ahead of its rival Art in America.

Canadian publisher Harlequin Enterprises invested in the company in 1979, becoming a minority owner and allowing the magazine to expand. ARTnews and Antiques World launched a publishing house in 1980 for books by art critics and industry professionals. Esterow's daughter Judith Esterow became associate publisher in 1986, having started at the magazine as a receptionist. By 1988, circulation had risen to 74,000. That year, The New York Times described the publication as "the elder statesman of American art magazines".

Milton Esterow introduced the Top 200 Collectors list in 1990, a special annual issue of the magazine that featured profiles of notable art collectors. ARTnews partnered with the German company Prestel Publishing in 1991 to launch a new publishing house for artist and photographer monographs. The downturn in the art market of the early 1990s put financial strain on the business as it relied on advertising income from galleries and other art market businesses. The magazine expanded its ads to broader consumer and luxury goods in the mid-90s, leading to increased revenue. Robin Cembalest was named editor of ARTnews in 1998.

To commemorate the magazine's 100th anniversary in 2002, the National Portrait Gallery in Washington organized an exhibition of archival photographs from the magazine of artists and art world figures. In 2005, the magazine had a print circulation of 85,000.

=== 2014–2018: Abbey House Group ownership, Art in America merger, sale to Peter Brant ===
Milton Esterow and his daughter sold the publication in April 2014 to Skate Capital, a private asset-management firm owned by Russian financier Sergey Skaterschikov, for a reported $2 million. The magazine had a print circulation of 80,000 at the time. Artnet News first reported at the time of the sale that it was made on behalf of Polish company Abbey House Group SA, which also owned an auction house, commercial gallery, and Poland's oldest art magazine, Art & Business; Abbey House confirmed this in June 2014, saying that it had made the purchase through Skaterschikov's privately held firm to better negotiate the sale without being subject to the transparency requirements for large purchases by public companies. The company also announced that it was merging with the parent company of ARTnews to form ArtNews SA. Sarah Douglas, former culture editor of The New York Observer, was named the new editor-in-chief of the publication as part of the transition, replacing Cembalest.

In July 2015, businessman Peter Brant announced that he had acquired an ownership stake in ArtNews SA through a series of transactions that involved Brant selling several art magazine brands to the company before becoming its new majority owner, including Art in America, Antiques magazine, and MODERN magazine. As part of the process, ARTnews and Art in America formally merged, with the latter's digital portfolio incorporated into the ARTnews website, though the two continued to publish separate print editions. Artnet News reported that the magazine was losing more than $300,000 annually at the time of the sale. ARTnews was reduced from monthly to quarterly print issues in October 2015. Brant completed additional transactions to transfer ArtNews SA's media properties to his company BMP Media Holdings in May 2016. The new BMP-controlled corporate entity overseeing ARTnews and its sister publications was named Art Media Holdings, while ArtNews SA declared bankruptcy as part of the transaction process.

=== 2018–present: Penske ownership, end of print publication ===
In 2018, Penske Media Corporation, the owner of Variety and Rolling Stone magazines, acquired Art Media Holdings from BMP, including ARTnews, Art in America, and its other art magazines. ARTnews ceased publishing quarterly print issues in 2021, with a final print edition for December 2021–January 2022. Penske also acquired Artforum in 2022, putting all three major American art magazines under the same ownership.

== Notable writers and articles ==
The magazine has featured writing and reporting from art critics, curators, historians, journalists, museum leaders, and artists including John Ashbery, Alfred H. Barr Jr., Scott Burton, Kenneth Clark, Arthur Danto, Elaine de Kooning, Willy Eisenhart, Robert Goodnough, Clement Greenberg, Thomas B. Hess, Aldous Huxley, Allan Kaprow, Marshall McLuhan, Robert Motherwell, Eleanor Munro, Linda Nochlin, Frank O'Hara, Fairfield Porter, Harold Rosenberg, Jean-Paul Sartre, Meyer Schapiro, Peter Schjeldahl, James Schuyler, Robert Storr, and Greg Tate. (Note: These names are sourced from articles in The New York Times and The Washington Post.)

Harold Rosenberg published the influential essay "The American Action Painters" in the magazine in 1952, which helped define the style and critical discourse around action painting and artists like Jackson Pollock.

Linda Nochlin's essay "Why Have There Been No Great Women Artists?", a revised and retitled version of a previous work for the anthology Woman in Sexist Society: Studies in Power and Powerlessness, was published in the January 1971 issue of ARTnews. The essay is generally considered required reading for the fields of feminist art history and feminist art theory inasmuch as it calls out the institutional barriers to the visual arts that women in the Western tradition historically faced; the essay has also served as an important impetus for the rediscovery of women artists, followed as it was by the exhibition Women Artists: 1550–1950. Eleanor Munro called it "epochal", and according to Miriam van Rijsingen "it is considered the genesis of feminist art history."

In 1984, the magazine published a story about Nazi-looted art that had become Austrian state property after World War II and been relegated to storage for several decades or donated to state museums. The article included accounts from several officials and descendants of Jewish collectors who said the Austrian government had not done enough to locate the rightful heirs of the paintings or allow restitution, and it led the government to open the holdings to reporters and researchers. Similarly, the magazine published reporting by Russian correspondents in 1992 about art looted by the Soviet Union during and immediately following the war, including details about the government's newly formed special commission to study the state's holdings. The authors of the article on Soviet plunder later expanded their research into a book.

== Awards ==
The magazine won the George Polk Award for Cultural Reporting in 1981 for its investigative reporting. The same year, it won the National Magazine Award for General Excellence among publications with a circulation less than 100,000. ARTnews won the Polk Award for Cultural Reporting again in 1992 for investigative reporting into art looted by the Soviet Union and kept by the state.

== ARTnews Top 200 Collectors ==
Introduced in 1990 by then-owner Milton Esterow, the ARTnews Top 200 Collectors list is published in an annual special issue and ranks art collectors from around the world on their overall influence in the art world and market, based on interviews with collectors, curators, dealers, auction houses, and museums. Those on the list are also surveyed, and their responses are used to inform trends and provide data, including a breakdown of where the most top art collectors live (historically the United States).

Collectors on the list are profiled with a brief biography and interviewed about their views on collecting and the art market over the previous year. The full list is published online and in a special annual print issue. As of 2025, the annual Top 200 Collectors issue is the only ARTnews-branded print product still published by the magazine.

== See also ==
- List of art magazines
- List of United States magazines
