= Digital Classics DVD =

DVD label in UK

Digital Classics DVD Limited is a UK-based DVD label which releases titles in the UK and worldwide across a range of genres: music, arts, documentaries, dramas and classic British comedy. Digital Classics DVD is part of DCD Media, one of Europe’s leading independent TV production and distribution groups.

On 14 March 2008, Digital Classics launched its classical music video download service from www.digitalclassics.co.uk, with videos such as The Peony Pavilion, Peter Greenaway's A TV Dante, Arias with Christine Schäfer, Anne Sofie von Otter, Paul Groves, David Daniels, Thomas Hampson, Felicity Lott and more.

== Comedy titles include ==
- Futtocks End starring Ronnie Barker and Michael Hordern (1969)
- Sir Henry at Rawlinson End written by Vivian Stanshall and starring Trevor Howard (1980)
- The Golden Coach a film by Jean Renoir starring Anna Magnani (1953)
- San Ferry Ann starring Barbara Windsor, Joan Sims, David Lodge and Wilfrid Brambell (1966)
- Simon, Simon starring Graham Stark, John Junkin and Norman Rossington with cameos from Peter Sellers, Michael Caine, Bob Monkhouse, Ernie Wise, Eric Morecambe and Tony Blackburn (1970)
- The Rise and Rise of Michael Rimmer a cult political satire starring and written by Peter Cook John Cleese and Graham Chapman and also starring Harold Pinter (1970)

== Drama titles include ==
- Die Brücke (The Bridge) a 1959 anti-war film by Bernhard Wicki
- The Great Silence a highly acclaimed Spaghetti Western by Sergio Corbucci starring Klaus Kinski and Jean-Louis Trintignant with a score by Ennio Morricone.
- Green Mansions starring Audrey Hepburn and Anthony Perkins (1959)
- Lisztomania directed by Ken Russell and starring Roger Daltrey
- Petulia directed by Richard Lester and starring Julie Christie and George C. Scott
- Just like a Woman starring Wendy Craig and Francis Matthews
- Dice starring Aidan Gillen, Martin Cummins, Gina McKee and Fred Ward. Produced by Box TV.
- Testimony The Story of Shostakovich. Starring Ben Kingsley.
- The 'Human' Factor starring George Kennedy, John Mills and Rita Tushingham
- Bon Voyage starring Fay Ripley and Ben Miles, directed by John Fawcett

== Documentary titles include ==
- Last Chance to See with Stephen Fry and Mark Carwardine.
- Stephen Fry in America
- Alan Whicker's Journey of a Lifetime
- The Invincibles - The 1974 British and Irish Lions Tour of South Africa
- Stephen Fry: HIV & Me
- Theatreland - Behind the Scenes at the Theatre Royal Haymarket

== Music titles include ==
- Beats of the Heart: 'Roots, Rock, Reggae' with Lee "Scratch" Perry, Bob Marley, Toots and the Maytals, Jimmy Cliff and more
- Beats of the Heart: Salsa with Celia Cruz, Tito Puente, Rubén Blades and more...
- Beats of the Heart: Rhythm of Resistance with Ladysmith Black Mambazo, the Mahotella Queens, Johnny Clegg and more...
- 'A Visit To Ali Farka Touré' by Marc Hureaux
- 'Music by...Gabriel Yared' by Rani Khanna
- 'The Rocker': Thin Lizzy's Phil Lynott
- Caetano Veloso: Un Caballero De Fina Estampa with the singer in concert singing hits such as 'Cucurrucucu Paloma', 'Haiti', and 'O Samba E O Tango'.

== Classical titles include ==
- 'The Salzburg Festival' historical documentary with Plácido Domingo, Maximilian Schell, Herbert von Karajan, Lang Lang, Anna Netrebko, Valery Gergiev and Simon Rattle
- Powder Her Face by Thomas Adès
- The Creation with the Bavarian Radio Symphony Orchestra conducted by Sir Georg Solti
- Aria: La Traviata the story of the opera with Kathleen Cassello, Leo Nucci, Roberto Alagna, Gianluigi Gelmetti and Angela Gheorghiu
- Julia Migenes: Diva on the Verge - the one woman show from the irrepressible soprano.
- 'Georg Solti and Murray Perahia Play Bartók's Sonata for Two Pianos and Percussion
- Stravinsky: Once at a Border by Tony Palmer
- 'Joan Sutherland: The Reluctant Prima Donna by Iambic Productions

== Dance titles include ==
- DV8 Physical Theatre: The Cost of Living
- Hans van Manen Festival starring the Dutch National Ballet, Kirvo Ballet, Bayerisches Staatsballet, and Nederlands Dans Theater
- The Nutcracker starring Mikhail Baryshnikov and Gelsey Kirkland
- Margot, the story of Margot Fonteyn by Tony Palmer
- Dancing for Mr. B: Six Balanchine Ballerinas with Maria Tallchief, Mary Ellen Moylan, Melissa Hayden, Allegra Kent, Merrill Ashley and Darci Kistler

== Other ==
In June 2006 Futtocks End was shown on the big screen in Trafalgar Square in London for the St. George's Day celebrations, prior to Monty Python and the Holy Grail.
