= Box TV =

Box TV may refer to:

- CRT television, a thick built television set, now largely obsolete, in contrast to a flat screen television.
- Box TV Limited, a UK-based production company specialising in film and television drama
- Box Television, formerly Video Jukebox Network International Limited, a British television company
