= Celebrity Squares =

British television series (1975–2015)

- Genre: Comedy panel game
- Based on: Hollywood Squares by: Merrill Heatter; Bob Quigley
- Written by: Les Keen (2014–2015); David Reilly (2014–2015); Aiden Spackman (2014–2015)
- Directed by: Richard Van't Riet (2014–2015)
- Presented by: Bob Monkhouse; Warwick Davis
- Announcer: Kenny Everett; Nick Jackson
- Theme music composer: Jack Parnell (1975–1979); Rick Turk (1993–1997); Invader Plus (2014–2015)
- Country of origin: United Kingdom
- Original language: English
- No. of series: 4 (ATV); 3 (Central); 2 (Revival)
- No. of episodes: 138 (ATV); 57 (Central); 15 (Revival)

Production
- Executive producers: Abigail Adams (2014–2015); Tony Moulsdale (2014–2015); Robert Massie (2014–2015)
- Producers: Roisin Jones (2014–2015); Niki Xenophontos (2014–2015)
- Production locations: ATV Elstree (1975–1979); Television House (1993–1997); The London Studios (2014–2015)
- Editors: Michael Marden (2014–2015)
- Running time: 40 minutes (ATV); 30 minutes (Central); 60 minutes (2014); 45 minutes (2015)
- Production companies: ATV (1975–1979); Reg Grundy Productions and Central (1993–1995); September Films and GroupM Entertainment (2014–2015)

Original release
- Network: ITV
- Release: 20 July 1975 – 7 July 1979
- Release: 8 January 1993 – 3 January 1995
- Release: 10 September 2014 – 7 June 2015

Related
- Hollywood Squares

Celebrity Squares is a British comedy game show based on the American comedy game show Hollywood Squares. It first ran on ITV from 20 July 1975 to 7 July 1979 and was hosted by Bob Monkhouse, then—also hosted by Monkhouse—from 8 January 1993 to 25 August 1995.

On 10 September 2014, a revival of the show produced by September Films and Motion Content Group debuted on ITV and was hosted by Warwick Davis. On 13 November 2015, DCD Media confirmed that the show had been cancelled.

== Format ==
The show is based on noughts and crosses. Inside each box is a celebrity. The host asks a celebrity a question, and if the contestant can correctly predict whether the celebrity got that question correct or wrong, then they will win that square and a money value. If the contestant's prediction is wrong, the opposing contestant wins the square and no money is won. However, if the round is at game point, the opponent must put their nought or cross in the square themselves. If they get three in row vertically, horizontally, diagonally or five in total, then they will win the round. Regular celebrities featured often with Willie Rushton occupying the centre square for the majority of editions. Pat Coombs was another regular participant and she and Monkhouse developed an ongoing repartee based on her response 'Hello Bobby' to his 'Hello Patty'.

In the ATV run, each square and game was worth £10. In rounds two, four and five, one celebrity was designated as a "secret square". Contestants who picked this square and got the corresponding question right won a special prize, usually either a holiday or a weekend break to a location in Europe.

In the Central and Reg Grundy Productions era of the show, each square in the first two rounds was worth £10 and winning a round was worth an extra £50. Also in this version, round two was the "secret square" round. For each round that neither player chose the secret square, the prize would be carried over to the next round, and the secret square would be re-positioned to a different celebrity.

In the Warwick Davis era, each square in the first two rounds was worth £50 and winning a round was worth an extra £500. Also in this version, round two (and round four in 2014) was a "mystery square" round.

The ATV editions contained a segment where the public sent in questions for Monkhouse to answer, posed by the squares; if he cannot answer them correctly, the writer earns £5, but if he can, he earns £10 for each and at the end of the round, it goes off to a member of the public in need of assistance.

In the second part of the show in the Central and Reg Grundy Productions era, the prize value doubled in round three to £20 a square and £100 for a winning round. If there was enough time for a fourth round, the money was doubled again to £40 a square and £200 for a winning round. In the fifth game on the 2014 series and the third game on the 2015 series, the prizes were £100 a square and £1000 for the win. When exactly one minute of game play was left, a buzzer would sound, and the rest of the round currently in progress would be turned into a speed round, by getting through the questions at a much quicker pace. At the end of the penultimate round, the contestant with the most money went into the final round.

In the final round, the contestant was given one question and had to give nine correct answers within 30 seconds. If the contestant did so, they win a star prize.

In the ATV version, the winning contestant had a choice of playing for an additional bonus of up to £100, or risking their money and secret square prizes for a chance to augment their cash winnings to £1,000. Failure to win £100 added £5 for each correct answer; gambling for the £1,000 jackpot and losing lost all but £5 for each acceptable answer.

In the Central version, winning the final round allowed the player to randomly choose of one of five cars on display. If a player lit seven or eight squares, their cash winnings were doubled as a consolation. From the second series in 1994, the choice of their car was selected prior to the final round and they got a pick of three different categories for their question. The five cars on offer for the star prize in the first series consisted of a Mini, a 4x4 Sports, a Cabriolet, a Saloon, and a Coupe. In the second series, the Mini was replaced by a Hatchback, and in the third series, the Coupe was replaced by an Estate, whilst the Mini returned, replacing the Saloon.

In the Warwick Davis version, a cash prize of £20,000 is played for in the final with £1,000 per square. In the second series, it was increased to £25,000 in the jackpot round.

== Transmissions ==
=== ATV ===
| Series | Start date | End date | Episodes |
|---|---|---|---|
| 1 | 20 July 1975 | 28 March 1976 | 38 |
| 2 | 5 September 1976 | 9 July 1977 | 44 |
| 3 | 31 December 1977 | 15 July 1978 | 28 |
| 4 | 23 December 1978 | 7 July 1979 | 28 |

According to the BBC Four documentary The Secret Life of Bob Monkhouse, nearly every single one of the 138 episodes of the ATV era has been wiped from the archives but Monkhouse saved 40 episodes in his video cassette collection.

=== Central and Reg Grundy Productions ===
| Series | Start date | End date | Episodes |
|---|---|---|---|
| 1 | 8 January 1993 | 7 May 1993 | 18 |
| 2 | 7 January 1994 | 27 August 1994 | 17 |
| 3 | 2 June 1995 | 25 August 1995 | 13 |

=== September Films and GroupM Entertainment ===
| Series | Start date | End date | Episodes |
|---|---|---|---|
| 1 | 10 September 2014 | 15 October 2014 | 6 |
| 2 | 19 April 2015 | 7 June 2015 | 8 |

=== Specials ===
| Date | Special |
|---|---|
| 20 December 2014 | Christmas Special |
