= Eve's Ribs =

- «Рёбра Евы»
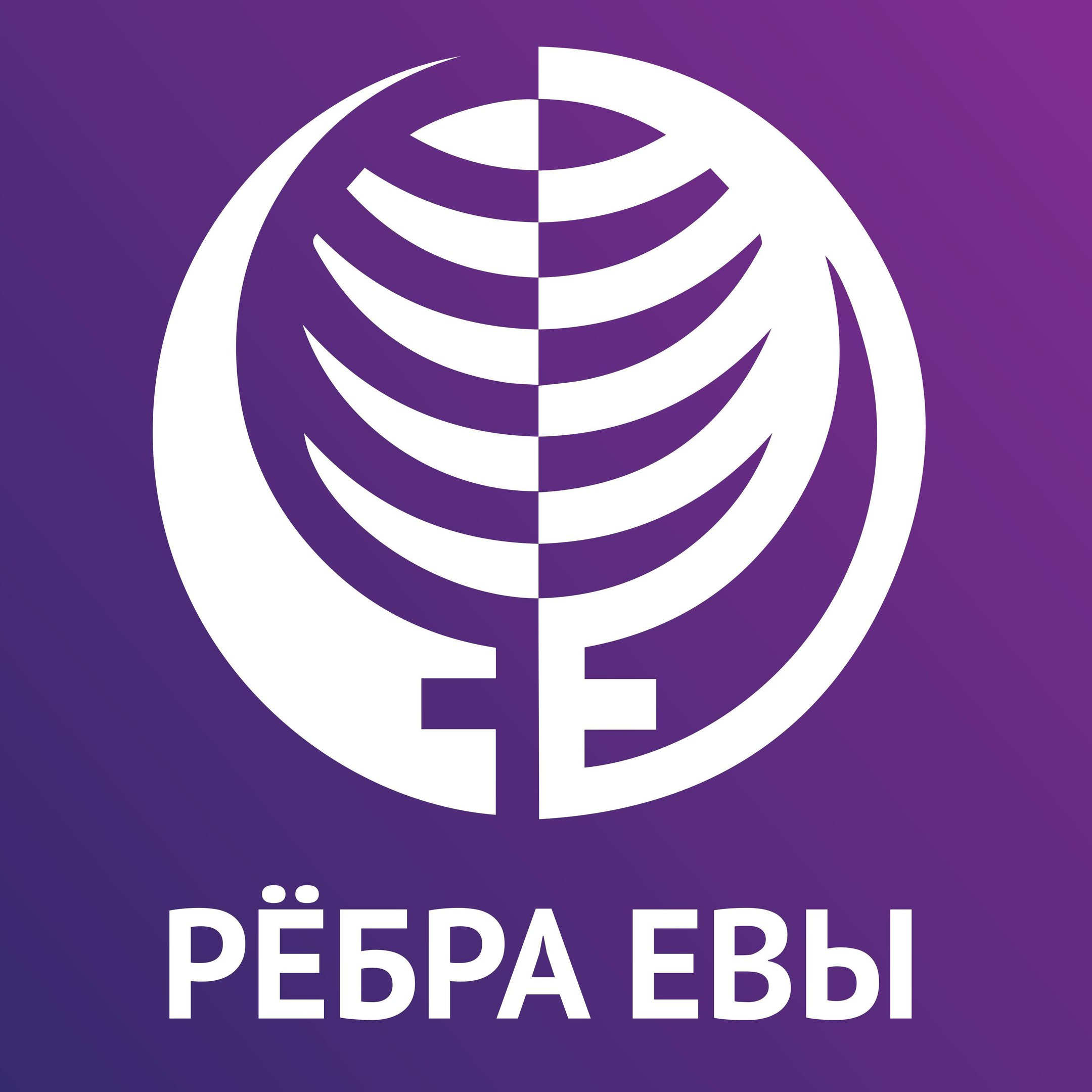
- Formation: 2015; 11 years ago
- Website: www.rebraevy.ru

Eve's Ribs (Russian: «Рёбра Евы») is a feminist multifaceted social and artistic project dedicated to fighting gender discrimination and violence against women. Itcovers several areas of socially-oriented work, including anti-war actionism. The project was founded in 2015 by Saint Petersburg-born director and actionist Leda Garina and actress and theatre producer Anastasia Trizna, who permanently resides in Helsinki.

Eve's Ribs project was initially established as a training centre specializing on visual practices, such as: performance, documentary theatre, video art, etc, and aimed at regional and feminist groups. Since 2015, it has regularly organized educational outdoor feminist schools in the Leningrad Oblast.

Since 2015, Eve's Ribs has also held an annual festival of the same name, consisting of documentary theatre, film, and performance, in Saint Petersburg. A total of five festivals have taken place. In 2019, the festival became an object of increased police attention due to a complaint by "gay-fighter" Timur Bulatov; a recording of "Pink and Blue" performance by Yulia Tsvetkova was screened in the presence of the police. In 2020, the festival was not held due to the COVID-19 pandemic. In 2021, Eve's Ribs festival took place in both Saint Petersburg and Moscow, presenting variety of works and public discussions in such venues as: The Meyerhold Center in Moscow, Theatre Litsedei in Saint Petersburg, etc. In 2022 and 2023, the festival was not held due to the emigration of the organizers after Russian invasion of Ukraine. Among festival’s participants were: Natasha Tyshkevich, editor of DOXA Magazine, who became a defendant in the DOXA case in 2021, and poet Oksana Vasyakina.

In 2016, Eve's Ribs collective created the humorous portal sexism.online ("Feminism for Dummies"), dedicated to topics of sexism. In 2016, screenwriter Leda Garina and artist Yulia Kurdi released a short animated work "Through the Asphalt" based on an essay by an American art historian, Professor Linda Nochlin, "Why Have There Been No Great Women Artists?" published in 1971, dedicated to discrimination against women in art.

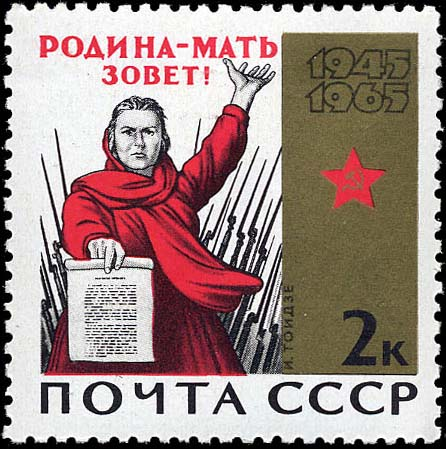
Soviet postage stamp of 1965 by the poster Irakli Toidze "Motherland Calls!"

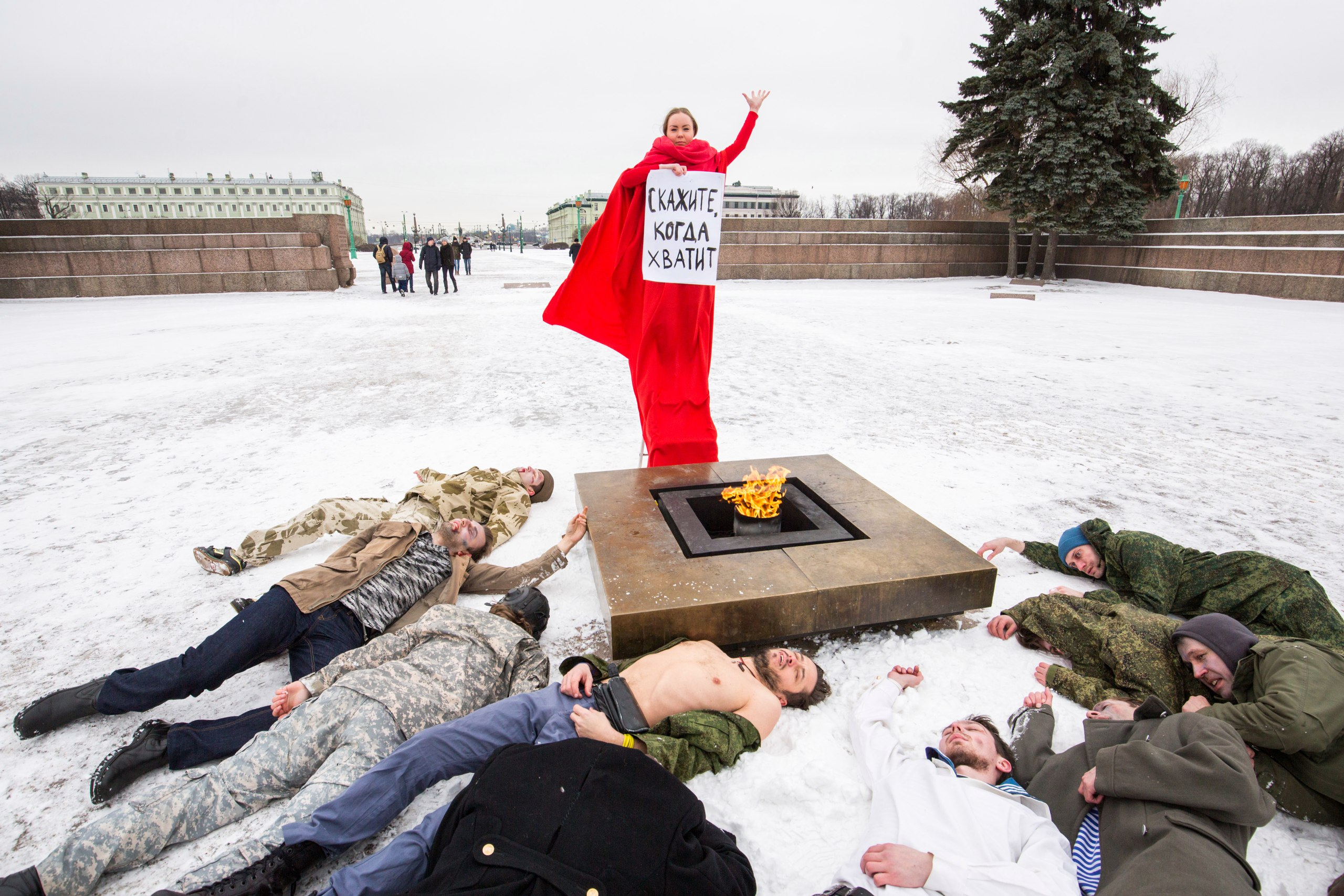
Action “Motherland” at the Eternal Flame on the Field of Mars in Petersburg on Defender of the Fatherland Day, February 23, 2017

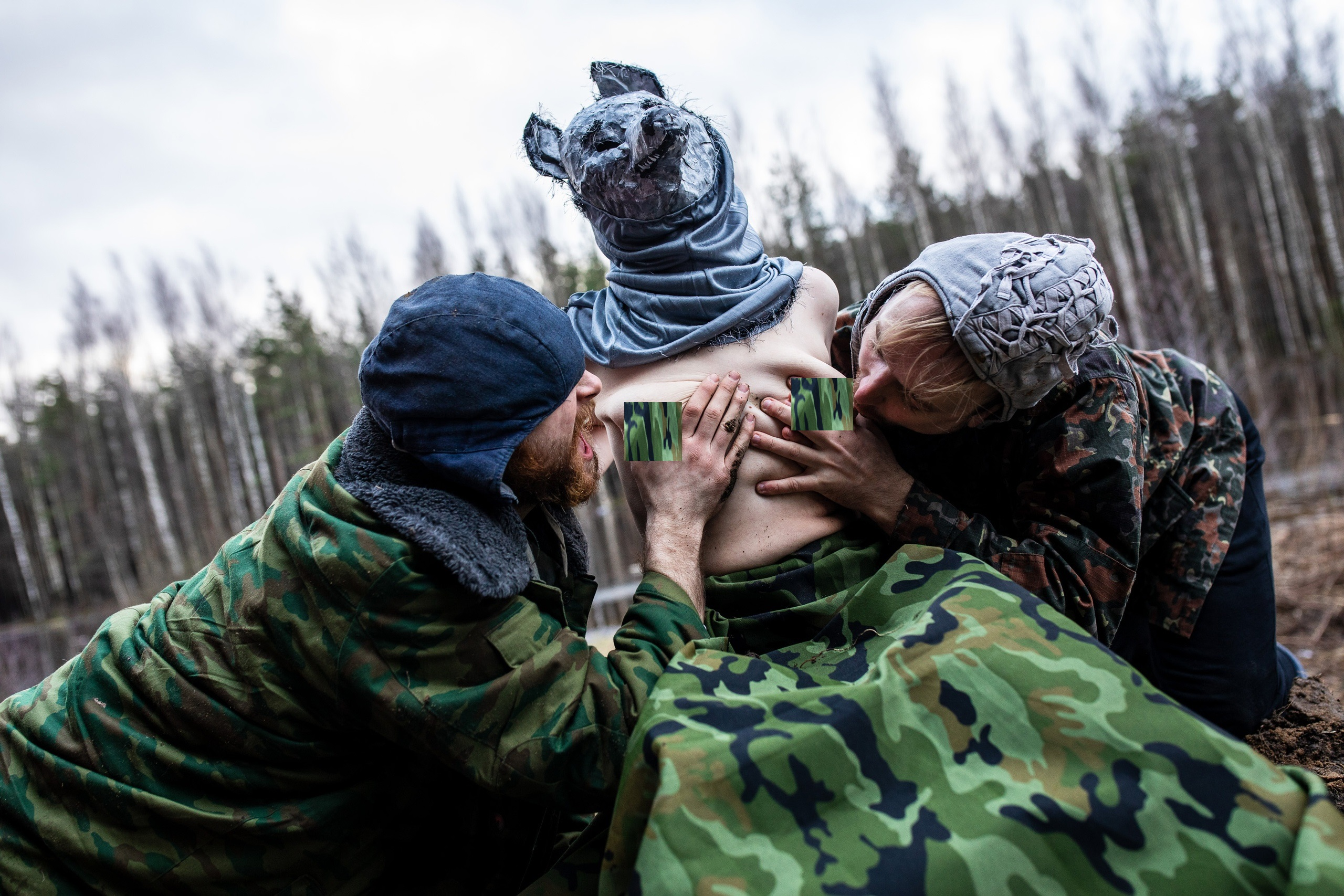
Action-triathlon “Hero Race” in St Petersburg on Defender of the Fatherland Day, February 23, 2020

As an art-collective, Eve's Ribs have authored dozens of performative street actions focused on gender violence and anti-war agenda, such as: an action against decriminalization of domestic violence near Moskovsky railway station in Saint Petersburg in January 2017, anti-militarist action “Motherland” at the Eternal Flame on Field of Mars in Saint Petersburg on Defender of the Fatherland Day in 2017, a procession against abortion along the Neva River - with the slogan "Orthodox Vaginal Control" on 1 October 2017, "Give birth to meat" performance near the walls of the military recruitment office of the Leningrad Oblast on Defender of the Fatherland Day in 2019, a triathlon "Race of Heroes" on Defender of the Fatherland Day in 2020, and many others. In 2017, "Capture the Kremlin" action was held in the Kremlin on International Women’s Day. Photos capturing "Men in power for 200 years. Out with them!" banner on the Kremlin wall and "Feminism is a national idea" banner on one of the Kremlin towers, created in a graphic editor, became famous. Eve's Ribs collective’s members have been repeatedly detained and harassed by law enforcement. In August 2017, the organisers were detained by police while trying to hold a feminist camp on the Black Sea coast in the Tuapse district of Krasnodar Krai. In autumn 2017, the BBC made a film about problems of Russian feminism, including detention of Eve's Ribs in Kuban. In 2017, Eve's Ribs opened an independent workspace in Fonarny Pereulok in Saint Petersburg, where they held events for women, including: tea parties, support groups, a book club, an English speaking club, yoga lessons, lectures, masterclasses, film screenings, and exhibitions. Up to 300 free events were held annually.

In 2018, Eve's Ribs launched Russia's first digital library of feminist fairy tales on the Fairy Tales for Girls online platform. In 2019, two volumes of “Fairy Tales for Girls” were published in collaboration with the bookstore Vse Svobodny.

In February 2019, Eve's Ribs opened feminist cafe called Simona in Fonarny Pereulok, 3 in Saint Petersburg. The cafe worked as a co-working space for women. Men were forbidden to enter, but the cafe was attempted to be broken into by the scandalous State Duma deputy Vitaly Milonov, and was visited by journalist Alexei Nimandov (disguised as a transgender person) and activists of the pro-Kremlin youth group Network. The group is a spiritual heir to movement Nashi.

On 28 December 2020, Daria Apakhonchich, one of the project coordinators and editor of “Fairy Tales for Girls”, anti-war artist and co-author of the “Feminists Explain” channel, was given a foreign agent status.

On 11 April 2022, an employee of Eve's Ribs, musician and artist Aleksandra Skochilenko, was arrested. On 16 November 2023, she was sentenced, in a Saint Petersburg court, to seven years of imprisonment for replacing supermarket price tags with antiwar slogans in 2022.

After the start of the invasion of Ukraine on 24 February 2022, the organizers left Russia under the threat of political persecution and continue their work abroad.
