= Eisenhardt =

Eisenhardt may refer to:

== People ==
- Ben Eisenhardt (born 1990), American-Israeli professional basketball player
- Louise Eisenhardt (1891–1967), American neuropathologist
- Roy Eisenhardt (born 1939), American lawyer

== Other ==
- Hess & Eisenhardt and O'Gara-Hess & Eisenhardt, former names of Centigon
- Max Eisenhardt, birth name of the comic book character Magneto

== See also ==
- Eisenhart, a surname
- Eysenhardtia, a genus of flowering plants in the legume family, Fabaceae
