= Leda Garina =

Russian theater director, civil activist and feminist

- Леда Гарина
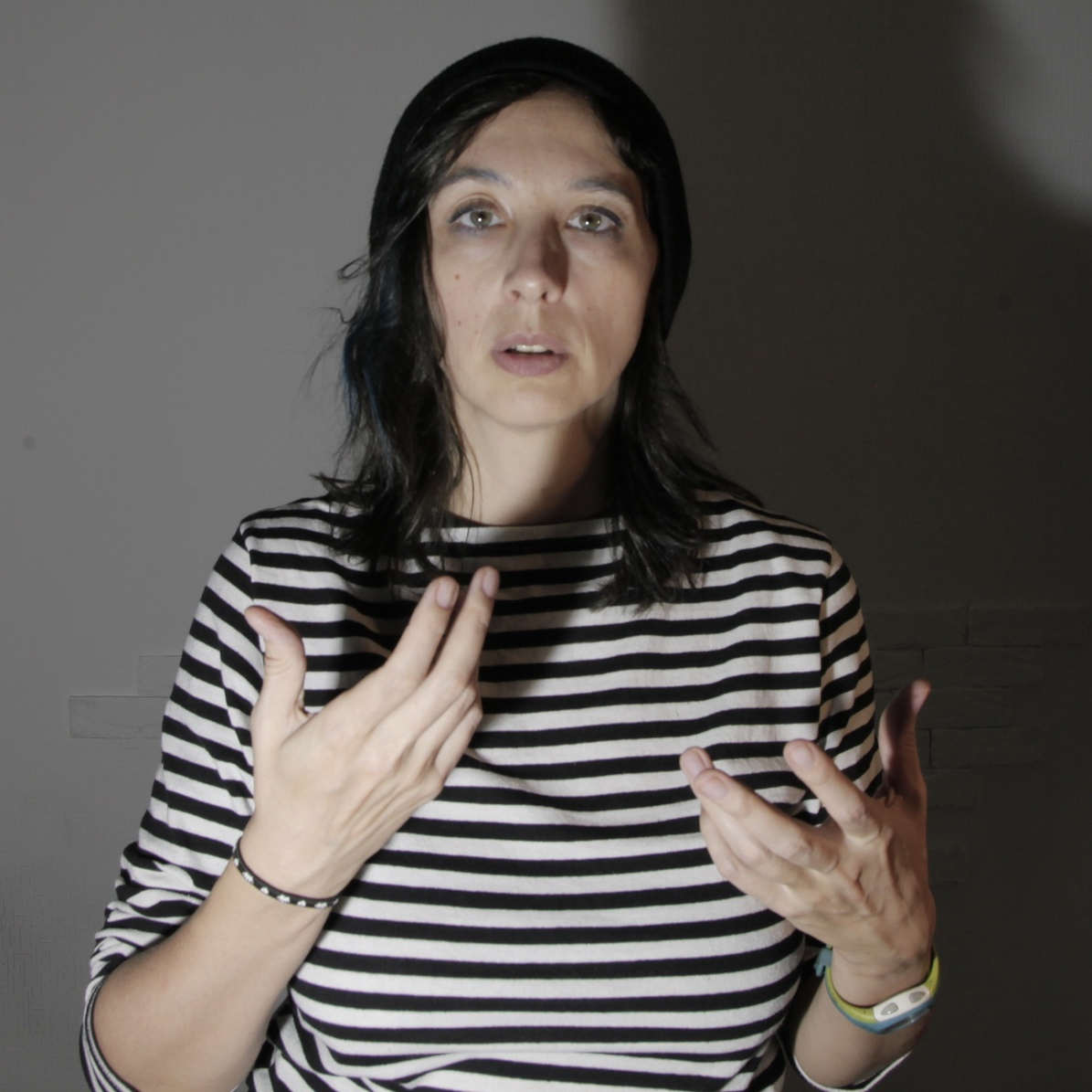
- Born: Natalya Yevgenyevna Garina; November 14, 1981; Leningrad, RSFSR, USSR

Leda Garina (Russian: Леда Гарина; née Natalya Yevgenyevna Garina, Наталья Евгеньевна Гарина; born October 14, 1981, Leningrad) is a Russian theater director, civil activist and feminist. She is the creator of the feminist project Eve's Ribs. After the Russian invasion of Ukraine, she moved to Tbilisi, the capital of Georgia.

== Early life and education ==
Born on October 14, 1981 in Leningrad, her mother was philologist Tatyana Vitalievna Garina, a teacher at the Department of Philosophy of Education, Pushkin Leningrad State University. Her younger brother is actor Vladimir Garin (1987-2003), who played one of the main roles in the film "The Return" by Andrei Zvyagintsev and died two months before the film's premiere.

In 1999 she entered the Saint Petersburg Theatre Arts Academy, the faculty of musical theater actors. She was expelled from the 4th year, in 2003 she entered the faculty of musical theater directing, course of A. V. Petrov, which she graduated in 2008. From 2017 to 2019 she studied at the Saint Petersburg School of New Cinema in the department of general directing.

== Activism and actions ==
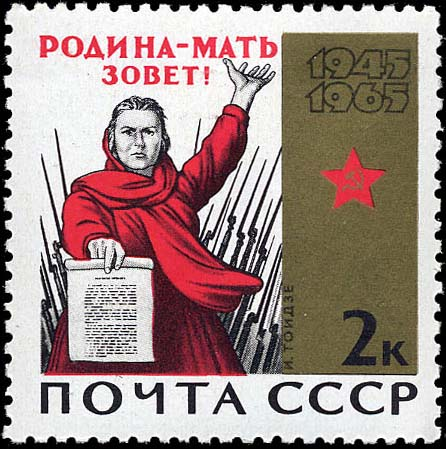
Soviet postage stamp of 1965 by the poster Irakli Toidze "Motherland Calls!"

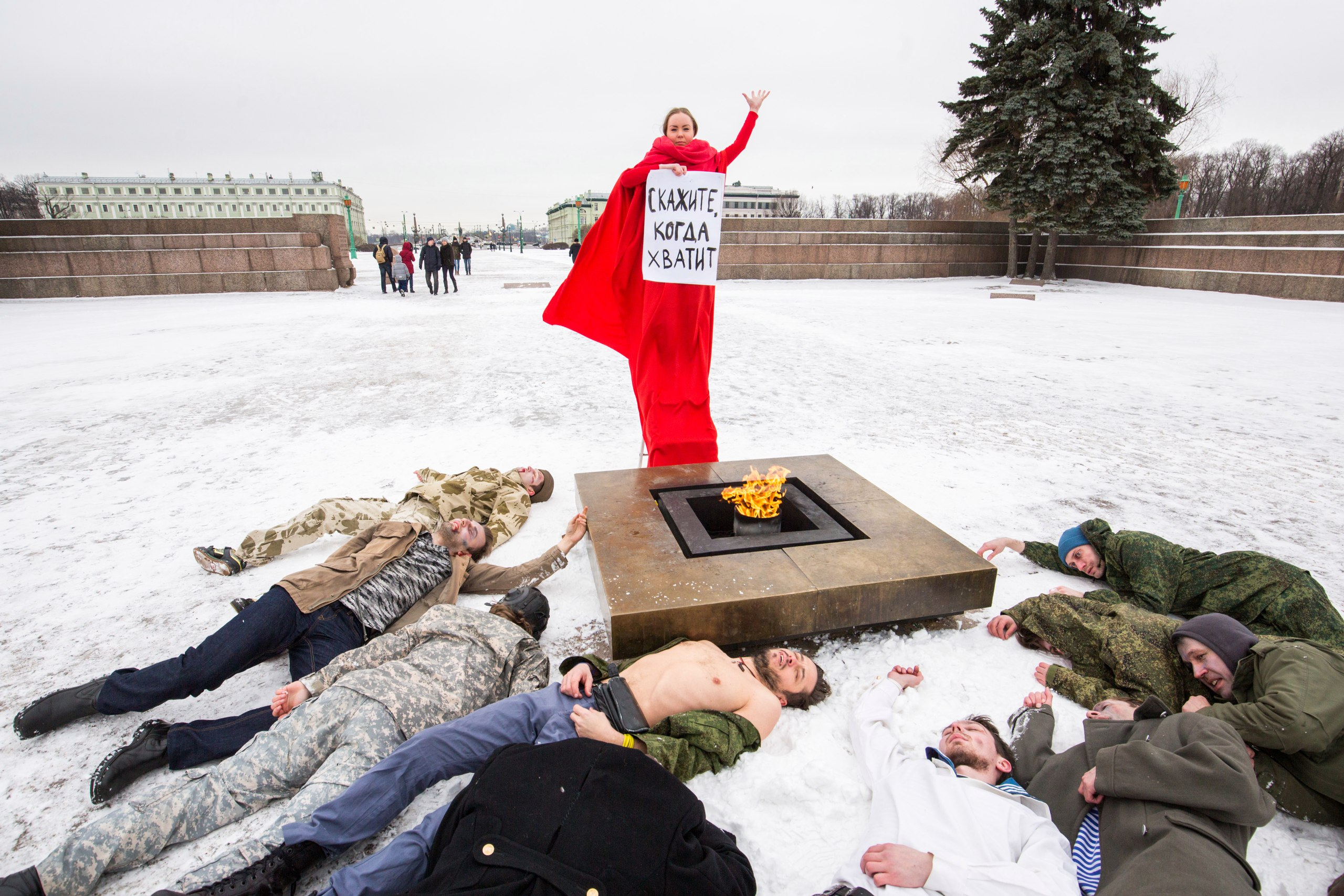
Action "Motherland" at the Eternal Flame on the Field of Mars in Petersburg on Defender of the Fatherland Day, February 23, 2017

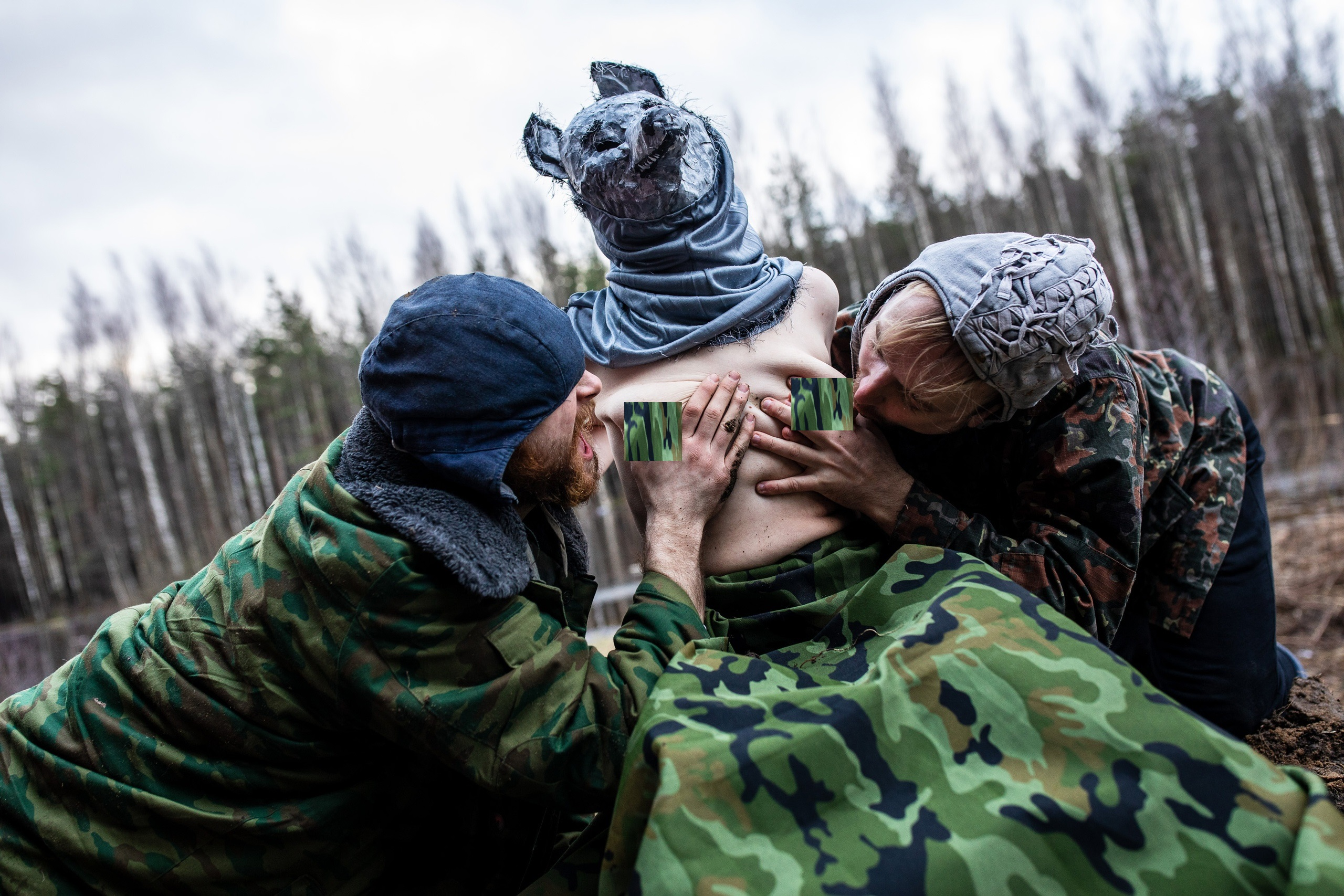
Action-triathlon "Hero Race" in Saint Petersburg on Defender of the Fatherland Day, February 23, 2020

She is the author of the 2011 actions "Squirrels' March to Smolny Institute" (in support of the initiative group "Defend Udelny Park"), "Drain United Russia", "United Russia's agitator was thrown into the river".

In 2012, she held the "Crucifixion of Democracy" campaign in support of Pussy Riot members at the Church of the Savior on Blood in Saint Petersburg. The action included a symbolic crucifixion of a woman wearing a balaclava (like the Pussy Riot members). On the horizontal crossbar of the cross there was the inscription "Your democracy can be here", on the alms box - "To restore the reputation of the Russian Orthodox Church".

In 2013, she held an action "Children against churches" with the participation of children against the construction of a temple in honor of the Descent of the Holy Spirit on the Apostles on Dolgoozernaya Street in St. Petersburg. The children held posters with the inscriptions "Orthodox lumberjack cuts down parks - Satan promised valuable gifts", "Orthodox businessman cuts down parks - Satan needs air, children have enough faith" and others.

She is the author of the action with anti-war posters imitating children's drawings in the Saint Petersburg Metro on Defender of the Fatherland Day in 2015, the "Road to the Temple" action (lined with "dead" bodies of women) on Defender of the Fatherland Day in 2016. In 2017, she participated in the anti-militarist action "Motherland" on Defender of the Fatherland Day at the Eternal Flame on the Field of Mars in Saint Petersburg. She is the author of the "Give birth to meat" action at the walls of the military registration and enlistment office of the Leningrad Oblast on Defender of the Fatherland Day in 2019, the action-triathlon "Hero Race" on Defender of the Fatherland Day in 2020.

She held an action against the decriminalization of beatings at the Moskovsky railway station in Saint Petersburg in January 2017.

She is the author of the "Capture the Kremlin" action in 2017 in the Kremlin on International Women's Day. Photos with the banner "Men in power for 200 years. Out with them!" became famous on the Kremlin wall and the banner "Feminism is a national idea" on one of the Kremlin towers, created in a graphic editor.

She is the author of the "State on Blood" action on Russia Day (June 12) in 2022 in Tbilisi.

She is the founder, ideologist and curator of the feminist project "Eve's Ribs", which includes the festival of the same name held in Saint Petersburg. The project was organized in 2016.

In August 2017, she was detained by the police along with other organizers while trying to hold a feminist camp on the Black Sea coast in the Tuapse district of Krasnodar Krai.

She coordinated the work of the femme cafe "Simona", which opened in Saint Petersburg in February 2019. The cafe worked as a co-working space for girls. Entry to men was prohibited, but the notorious State Duma deputy Vitaly Milonov tried to break into the cafe; it was visited by journalist Alexei Nimandov (under the guise of a transgender person) and activists of the pro-Kremlin youth group Network. The group is a spiritual heir to movement Nashi. In response to Network's visit to the femme cafe, Simona in 2019 held a flower funeral on International Women's Day on the steps of the Wedding Palace on the English Embankment posters "Your flowers will grow on the grave of the patriarchy" and "Who will come to us with what for what - one from this and that!".

She was a speaker on issues of anti-militarism and abolitionism at conferences in Sweden, Norway (Generation XXX? 2018), the Åland Islands in Finland (Åland 17), London, United Kingdom (FiLia 2017), Belgium.

== Content creation ==
Since 2010, she was a member of the Saint Petersburg Parents movement, which protested against the law on the commercialization of the public sector - 83-FZ "On amendments to certain legislative acts of the Russian Federation in connection with the improvement of the legal status of state (municipal) institutions" (adopted by the State Duma on April 23, 2010 year). As part of cooperation with the project, she made a video with a sarcastic appeal from children to the president of Russia Dmitry Medvedev, which collected more than 100 thousand views in 4 days, and "without warning or any explanation" was removed from YouTube.

In 2012, she released more than 70 materials on the fake news site Fognews, including popular "news" that Vladimir Zhirinovsky left politics, Valery Gergiev supported Pussy Riot, Vitaly Milonov proposed introducing mandatory conscription for nulliparous women.

From 2013 to 2014, together with Olga Markina, host of the Komsomolskaya Pravda in Saint Petersburg radio, and presenter Dmitry Filippov, she hosted the "Women's Nonsense" program on Fontanka FM radio, dedicated to issues of discrimination against women. In 2014, an audiobook based on the programs was released.

In 2015, as part of the fight against anti-abortion initiatives, she launched the "Right to Abortion" («Право на аборт») channel on YouTube.

In 2016, together with the artist Julia Kurdi, as a screenwriter, she released a short animated film "Through the Asphalt" («Сквозь асфальт») based on the essay "Why Have There Been No Great Women Artists?" published in 1971 by the American art historian, professor Linda Nochlin.

She is one of the authors on the Fairy Tales for Girls platform, the author of materials on gender discrimination and actionism in the publications Colta.ru and Forbes.ru, curator of the laboratory of femme dramaturgy in Almaty, the capital of Kazakhstan (Fem Workshop Almaty), whose plays were included in the collection "Causal Place" («Причинное место»), consisting of texts written in 2020–2022 by writers from Central Asia and other post-Soviet regions.

In 2022, together with the NGO Stellit, she released a short film "Every Fifth" («Каждый пятый»), dedicated to sexualized violence against children.

Since 2023, she has been the author and curator, together with Yulia Karpukhina, of the anti-colonial channel "Dragon's Teeth - Feminist Criticism of Imperial Myths" («Зубы дракона — феминистская критика имперских мифов») on YouTube.

== Theater directing ==
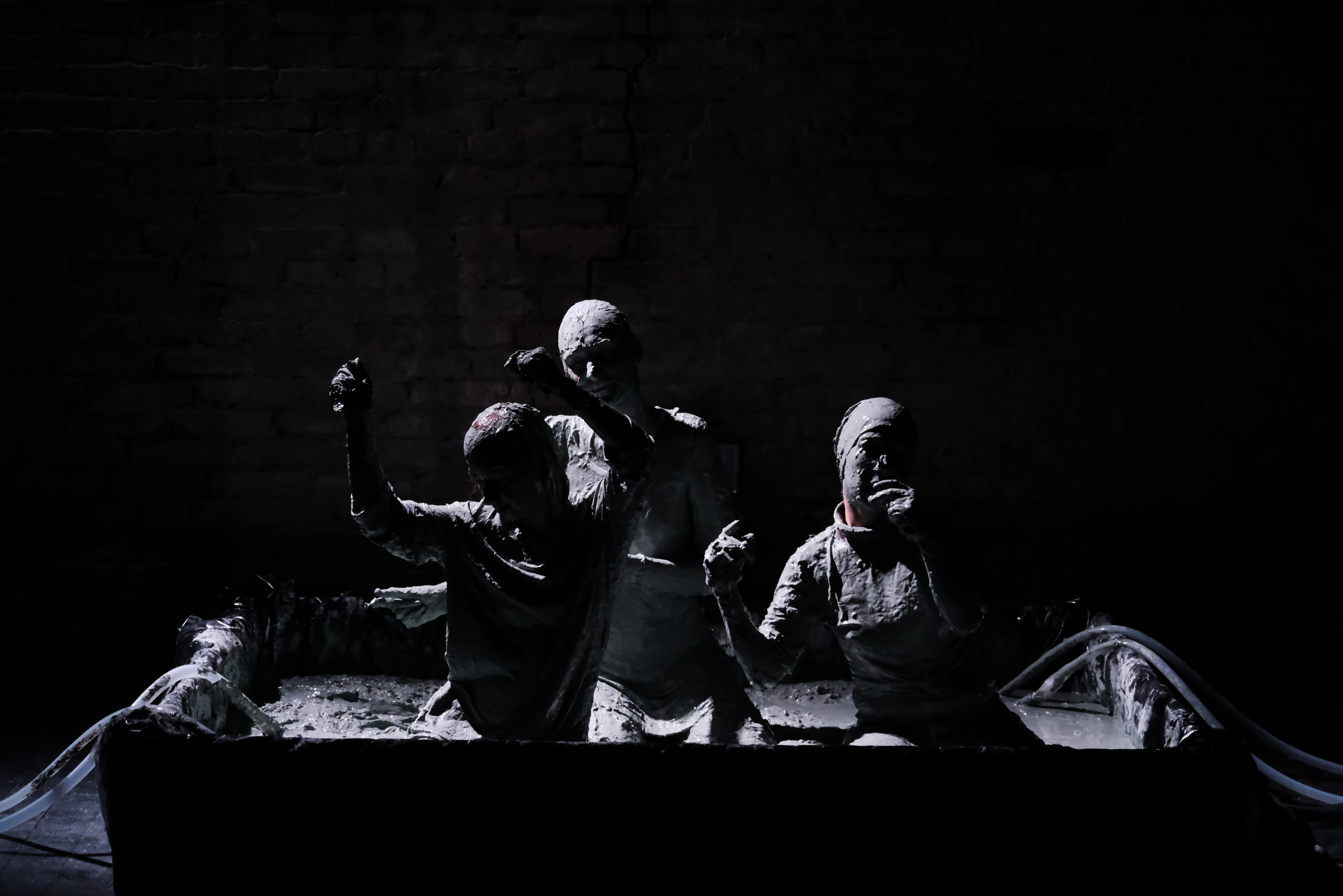
Performance "Electra Complex" February 27, 2021

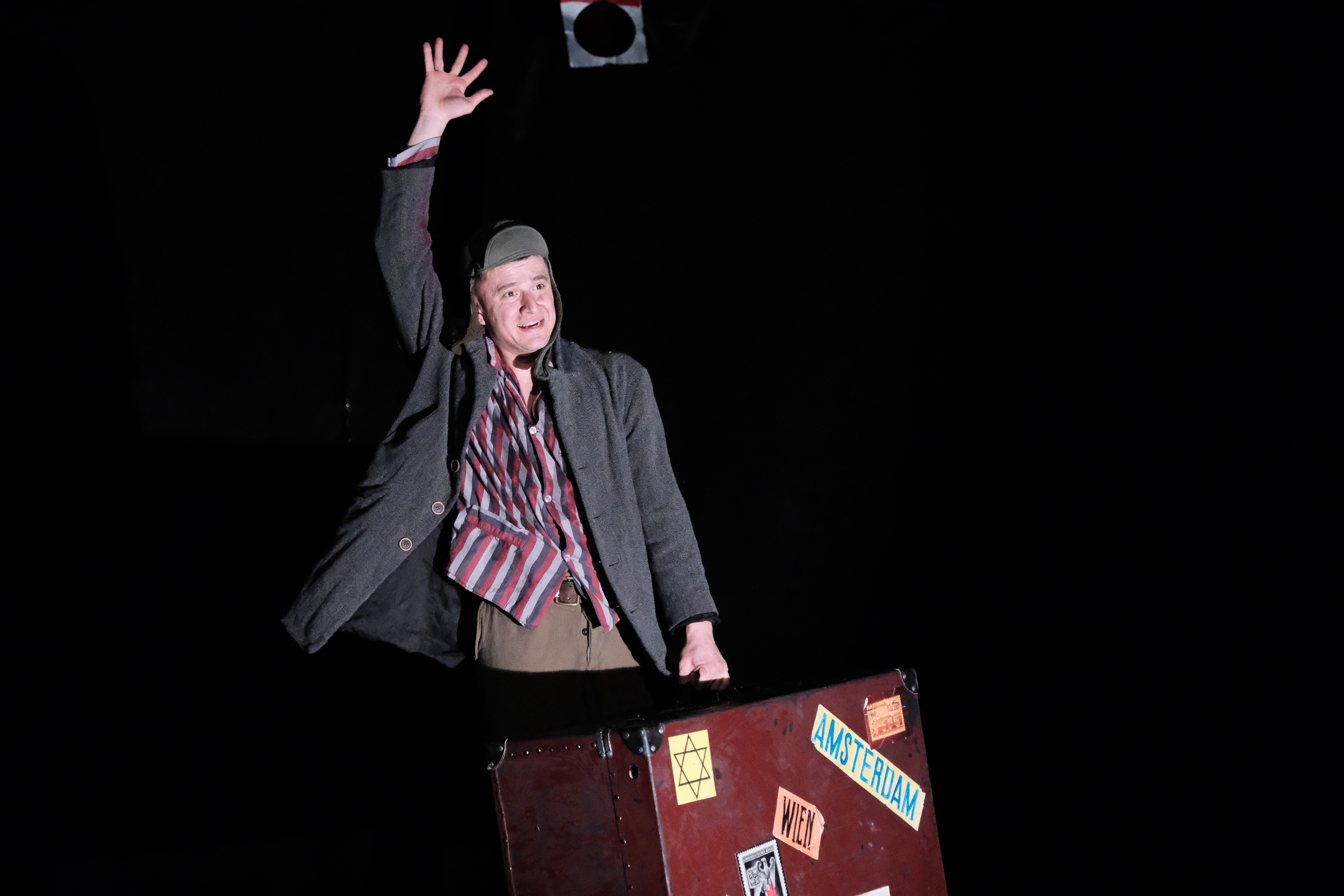
Performance of the play "Where do babies come from?" based on the works of Ludvík Aškenazy April 11, 2021

In April 2010, she participated in the "Young Directors for Children" laboratory of the Union of Theatre Workers of the Russian Federation as part of the VII All-Russian festival of theatrical art for children "Harlequin" in Saint Petersburg. She presented at the laboratory a creative performance of the play "Where do babies come from?" based on the works of Ludvík Aškenazy.

She staged the play "Why Am I Such a Stupid?" (premiere December 4, 2011).

From 2005 to 2022, she worked as a full-time director at the Saint Petersburg State Children's Musical Theater "Through the Looking Glass" (Zazerkal'ye). As of 2023, you can see the works of Leda Garina there: a play based on the fairy tale "Crocodile" by Korney Chukovsky and the play "Where do babies come from?" based on the works of Ludvík Aškenazy. For the play "Crocodile" Leda Garina was awarded a diploma from the XXIII festival "Theatres of St. Petersburg for Children" "for courage and search for playful forms of reading the poetry of K. Chukovsky". The awards presentation took place on April 16, 2014.

Since 2014 she has been a director of independent inclusive performances. She staged a charity performance based on the play "The Vagina Monologues" by Eve Ensler, together with INGI. Crisis Center for Women, as part of the V-Day campaign in 2015, the charity performance "Behind the Stone Wall" based on the collection of texts against violence against women "A Memory, a Monologue, a Rant, and a Prayer" (editor Eve Ensler), in 2016 - a documentary play "The Rules of War" about military rape. In collaboration with the project "They Will Believe You", she staged the documentary play "The Electra Complex", which included personal stories of people who survived sexual abuse of children and adolescents.

She staged a documentary play about women who became victims of the commercial sex industry in Russia and abroad "Starting Point".

== Personal life ==
She was married to archaeologist Alexander Konstantinovich Ocherednoy (born 1975), a research fellow at the Institute of the History of Material Culture of the Russian Academy of Sciences, but later divorced him. In 2008, she gave birth to a daughter.
