= Why Have There Been No Great Women Artists? =

Essay by Linda Nochlin

"Why Have There Been No Great Women Artists?" is a 1971 essay by American art historian Linda Nochlin. It is noted for its contribution to feminist art history and theory, and its examination of the institutional obstacles that prevent women from succeeding in the arts.

== Content ==
In this essay, Nochlin explores the institutional – as opposed to the individual – obstacles that have prevented women in the West from succeeding in the arts. She divides her argument into several sections, the first of which takes on the assumptions implicit in the essay's title, followed by "The Question of the Nude", "The Lady's Accomplishment", "Successes", and "Rosa Bonheur". In her introduction, she acknowledges "the recent upsurge of feminist activity" in America as a condition for her interrogation of the ideological foundations of art history, while also invoking John Stuart Mill's suggestion that "we tend to accept whatever is as natural". In her conclusion, she states: "I have tried to deal with one of the perennial questions used to challenge women's demand for true, rather than token, equality by examining the whole erroneous intellectual substructure upon which the question 'Why have there been no great women artists?' is based; by questioning the validity of the formulation of so-called problems in general and the 'problem' of women specifically; and then, by probing some of the limitations of the discipline of art history itself."

Nochlin opens her argument by characterizing the absence of “supremely great” women artists as comparable to the absence of “great Lithuanian jazz pianists,” a deliberately provocative analogy that reframes the issue as structural rather than biological or innate. This comparison shifts attention away from assumed female inadequacy and toward the social conditions that make artistic prestige possible.

Scholars have also described the essay as an attack on the “myth of the Great Artist,” meaning the idea that artistic genius naturally emerges regardless of circumstance. Nochlin debunks what she calls the "golden nugget", a central point in her argument. According to Nochlin, the insufficient political, social and financial infrastructure provided to women is a greater impediment to their success than their lack of innate artistic ability. Women were historically barred from studying the nude model, a restriction that limited access to history painting, then regarded as the highest-ranking academic genre. This line of interpretation further presents the essay as grounding women’s underrepresentation in the arts in institutions and patronage rather than in an absence of talent.

More recent feminist art-historical discussion has treated the essay’s later sections, including its discussion of successful women artists, as part of a broader argument that isolated examples do not invalidate the structural barriers Nochlin identifies. In that interpretation, the essay helped establish a model for analyzing both exclusion from artistic institutions and exclusion from the industry, and it is widely described as foundational to feminist art history.

== Publication history and legacy ==
First published in 1971 as "Why Are There No Great Women Artists?" in Woman in Sexist Society: Studies in Power and Powerlessness, Nochlin's essay was revised, retitled "Why Have There Been No Great Women Artists?" and published in the January 1971 issue of ARTnews. It was also released with other essays and photographs in Art and Sexual Politics: Why Have There Been No Great Women Artists? (1971, edited by Thomas B. Hess and Elizabeth C. Baker). The essay has been reprinted regularly since then, including in Nochlin's Women, Art, and Power and Other Essays (1988) and Women Artists: The Linda Nochlin Reader (2015, edited by Maura Reilly and Nochlin).

"Why Have There Been No Great Women Artists?" is generally considered required reading for the fields of feminist art history and feminist art theory inasmuch as it calls out the institutional barriers to the visual arts that women in the Western tradition historically faced. Nochlin considers the history of women's lack of art education as well as the nature of art and of artistic genius as they are currently defined. The essay has also served as an important impetus for the rediscovery of women artists, followed as it was by the exhibition Women Artists: 1550–1950. Eleanor Munro called it "epochal", and according to Miriam van Rijsingen "it is considered the genesis of feminist art history."

The essay's title and content have inspired a number of essays and publications about the absence of women in certain professional fields, such as "Why Are There No Great Women Chefs?" by Charlotte Druckman (2010). In 1989 an exhibition was held to increase visibility for women artists entitled Women's Work: the Montana Women's Centennial Art Survey Exhibition 1889-1989, inspired by Nochlin's groundbreaking contribution.

== See also ==
- Advancing Women Artists Foundation
- Women in Animation
- Lists of women artists
- List of 20th-century women artists
- List of 21st-century women artists
- List of female sculptors
- Australian feminist art timeline
- List of Australian women artists
- National Gallery of Australia Know My Name
- Beaver Hall Group
- Bonn Women's Museum
- Female comics creators
- Guerrilla Girls On Tour
- National Museum of Women in the Arts
- Native American women in the arts
- Women Environmental Artists Directory
- Women in photography
- Women's International Art Club
- Women surrealists
- Women's Studio Workshop
- The Story of Women and Art, 2014 television documentary
