= Amanda Vickery =

British historian

Amanda Vickery FBA
- Born: 8 December 1962 (age 63); Preston, Lancashire, United Kingdom

Academic background
- Education: Bedford College, London
- Thesis: Women of the local elite in Lancashire, 1750-c.1825 (1991)
- Doctoral advisor: Penelope J. Corfield

Academic work
- Discipline: Modern history
- Institutions: Queen Mary, University of London

Amanda Jane Vickery FBA (born 8 December 1962) is an English historian, writer, radio and television presenter, and professor of early modern history at Queen Mary, University of London.

== Education and career ==
Vickery was born in Preston, Lancashire, England, and attended Penwortham Girls' Grammar School. She graduated from the former Bedford College, London (now part of Royal Holloway, University of London), where she completed her PhD in Modern History.

Vickery is professor of early modern history at Queen Mary, University of London, and has held academic posts at Royal Holloway, University of London and Churchill College, Cambridge. She has been visiting professor at Stanford, Munich & California Institute of Technology. She holds an honorary doctorate from the University of Uppsala. She is winner of the Longman History Today prize, the Whitfield Prize and the Wolfson History Prize. Her academic interests encompass the late modern period from the seventeenth century to the present with a strong emphasis on the Georgian period in England.

In 2023–2024, Vickery was a Residential Fellow at the Swedish Collegium for Advanced Study in Uppsala, Sweden.

=== Writing ===
Vickery has written widely on social history, literature, the history of romance and the home, politics, law and crime with an emphasis on women's studies and feminism. Her first book was based on the writings of Elizabeth Shackleton who married ill-advisedly and then disastrously in the 18th century. The book was titled The Gentleman's Daughter: Women's Lives in Georgian England (1998), for which she received the Whitfield prize, the Wolfson History prize and the Longman-History Today prize. She co-edited Gender, Taste, and Material Culture in Britain and North America, 1700-1830 (2006) followed by Behind Closed Doors: At Home in Georgian England (2009). The book was well received by Kathryn Hughes and Dominic Sandbrook.

=== Television ===
Vickery has presented several history programmes for BBC2. Her three-part Story of Women and Art was shortlisted for a Scottish Bafta. She has presented At Home with the Georgians (2010), a three-part television series based on her book Behind Closed Doors. and The Many Lovers of Miss Jane Austen (2011). These were produced by Matchlight for screening on BBC Two.

With Alistair Sooke, Vickery co-presented Pride and Prejudice: Having a Ball (2013). The one-off episode recreated a regency ball, the social event at the heart of Pride and Prejudice, to mark the 200th anniversary of the novel's publication.

Vickery has worked with Tom Service. They have co-presented three documentaries linking music and history with Reef Television: Messiah at the Foundling Hospital, La Traviata, and Leningrad & the Orchestra That Defied Hitler. Messiah at the Foundling Hospital won the Czech Crystal award and was shortlisted for an Emmy award.

=== Radio ===
Vickery is a regular contributor to arts, history, and cultural review programmes broadcast by BBC Radio. She has appeared on BBC Radio 4's In Our Time, Saturday Review, and Start the Week.

In 2009, she wrote and presented the 30-part series A History of Private Life on BBC Radio 4, which received critical acclaim. It has since been made into a BBC CD.

Since 2010, she has presented the three series of the BBC Radio 4 history programme Voices from the Old Bailey. Vickery makes programmes for Radio 4 through independent production company Loftus Audio.

In March 2011, she was a guest on Private Passions, the biographical music discussion programme on BBC Radio 3.

== Honours ==
On 30 January 2015 Vickery received an honorary doctorate from the Faculty of Arts at Uppsala University, Sweden. She was elected a Fellow of the British Academy in 2021.

== Works ==
=== Books ===
- The Gentleman's Daughter: Women's Lives in Georgian England (1998) ISBN 0300102224
- Women, Privilege, and Power: British Politics, 1750 to the Present (2001) ISBN 0804742847
- [ed.] Gender, Taste, and Material Culture in Britain and North America, 1700-1830 (2006) ISBN 0300116594
- Behind Closed Doors: At Home in Georgian England (2009) ISBN 0300168969

=== Television ===
Year	Title	Channel	Notes
2010	At Home with the Georgians	BBC Two	Three Part Series - 2 December 2010
2011	The Many Lovers of Miss Jane Austen	BBC Two	23 December 2011
2013	Pride and Prejudice: Having a Ball	BBC Two	10 May 2013
2014	Messiah at the Foundling Hospital	BBC Two	19 April 2014
2014	The Story of Women and Art	BBC Two	Three Part Series - 16 May 2014
2015	La Traviata: Love, Death and Divas	BBC Two	20 June 2015
2015	Suffragettes Forever! The Story of Women and Power	BBC Two	Three Part Series - 25 February 2015
2016	Leningrad & the Orchestra That Defied Hitler	BBC Two	2 January 2016
