= David Elstein =

British media executive

David Keith Elstein (born 14 November 1944) is an executive producer and a former chair of openDemocracy.

== Early life and career ==
His parents were Jewish Polish orphans who were brought to Britain by the Rothschild Foundation, and ran a ladies' outfitters in Golders Green. On a scholarship, he was educated at Haberdashers' Aske's Boys' School, before gaining a place to read history at Gonville and Caius College, Cambridge, earning a double first. After graduating at the age of 19, he became a trainee at the BBC in 1964. He spent most of his first year at the BBC on attachment to the new Centre of Cultural Studies at Birmingham University.

At the BBC, David Elstein worked on Panorama and The Money Programme. His subsequent production credits, include for Thames Television, The World at War and This Week (of which he became editor) and elsewhere Weekend World, A Week in Politics, Yuri Nosenko, KGB and Concealed Enemies.

== Director of programmes at Thames ==
After a period as an independent producer working on programmes broadcast by Channel 4, he rejoined Thames Television as Director of Programmes in 1986. In this role in 1988 he signed off the controversial programme "Death on the Rock", an edition of the This Week series about Operation Flavius, the shooting in Gibraltar of three unarmed members of the IRA.

Blamed in part for Thames losing its franchise to broadcast at the end of 1992, Elstein delivered the previous year's MacTaggart Memorial Lecture at the Edinburgh Television Festival. In his speech he mocked what was now an auction as Margaret Thatcher's "National Lottery", criticised the Conservative government for behaving with "spite" towards ITV, and called the franchise round "a death on the rack to make up for 'Death on the Rock'." Elstein had hoped that a clause in the Broadcasting Act 1990 would save Thames thanks to its past reputation, since underbidding Carlton, the eventual winners, had been a deliberate choice. He found to his disappointment that "the exceptionality clause wasn't worth the paper it was written on."

== Later career ==
After serving as head of programming at BSkyB, he launched Channel 5 as its chief executive in 1997. Elstein has also been managing director of primetime productions and managing director of Brook Productions Ltd.

== Other career highlights ==
He has been a visiting professor at the University of Westminster, University of Stirling and University of Oxford, having been the inaugural visiting professor in Broadcast Media at Oxford in 1999. His six lectures there were entitled "The Political Structure of UK Broadcasting 1949–99". The lecture series was published in 2015 as an open access eBook by meson press. Elstein was the lead author of the Broadcasting Policy Group's publication, "Beyond The Charter: The BBC After 2006" (2006). He advocates changing the funding model of the BBC and replacing the licence fee with voluntary subscription.

He is also a director of Kingsbridge Capital Advisors Limited, and was previously a supervisory board member of two German cable companies. He has also chaired Screen Digest Ltd, DCD Media plc, Luther Pendragon Holdings, Sparrowhawk Media, the British Screen Advisory Council, the Commercial Radio Companies Association, Really Useful Theatres, XSN plc, Sports Network Group plc, Silicon Media Group, Civilian Content plc and the National Film and Television School. He was also a director of Virgin Media Inc and Marine Track Holdings plc.
