= Dice (miniseries) =

- Dice DVD
- Written by: A.L. Kennedy; John Burnside
- Directed by: Rachel Talalay
- Starring: Aidan Gillen; Martin Cummins; Gina McKee; Fred Ward
- Countries of origin: Canada; United Kingdom
- Original language: English
- No. of seasons: 1
- No. of episodes: 6

Production
- Producers: Gub Neal; Lorraine Richard; Greg Dummett
- Cinematography: Jean-Pierre Trudel
- Editors: Gaetan Huot; Denis Papillon
- Running time: 2 x 102 mins.

Original release
- Release: November 12 – December 17, 2001

Dice is a Canadian/British co-produced drama television miniseries which aired between November 12 and December 17, 2001. It was directed by Rachel Talalay and written by A. L. Kennedy and John Burnside, inspired by cult 70s novel The Dice Man by Luke Rhinehart.

== Plot ==
Dice tells the story of charismatic psychology teacher, Glenn Taylor, who manipulates people by teaching them how to live by the throw of a dice. When the small community is shattered by the death of student Sally Quine, Detective Patrick Styvesant finds himself drawn deeper into a bizarre world where decisions are ruled by the dice. As Taylor's influence over the community deepens, Patrick also has his own demons to contend with as he battles alcoholism and his repressed homosexuality, all of which make him a perfect target for Taylor.

== Main cast ==
- Martin Cummins as Patrick Styvesant
- Aidan Gillen as Glenn Taylor
- Gina McKee as Angela Starck
- Fred Ward as Gacy
- Brendan Fletcher as Alasdair MacCrae
- Callum Keith Rennie as Egon Schwimmer
- Tracy Wright as Gil

== Episodes ==
No.	Original release date
1	November 12, 2001
After the discovery of Sally Quine's tortured and mutilated body in small town 'Harmony', Detective Patrick Styvesant is assigned to the investigation. Alasdair MacCrae, Sally's boyfriend and the initial suspect, hides in a motel, tracked by private detective Gacy. Visiting Sally's university, Styvesant learns about a game popular with the students: making a list of six possible actions and letting a dice decide which one to take. Psychology teacher Glenn Taylor has introduced the dice game to the students and to other people - among which, mentally disturbed Egon Schwimmer who bursts into the squad room razor in hand and confesses to Sally's murder. Styvesant finds and interrogates Gacy who claims he lost track of Alasdair. Styvesant secretly follows him to the murder scene where Gacy just discovered a button that the police have missed.
2	November 19, 2001
While a masked intruder assaults Alasdair in his motel room, Gacy manages to get rid of Styvesant. Marcus Starck, college hockey coach and another dice addict, argues with his wife Angela, and leaves for a bar where he's met by Taylor who tells him the dice will help him find the winning way. Meanwhile, Angela receives an anonymous phone call about Sally's murder. In jail, Egon gets increasingly antsy without his dice. Stuyvesant and Taylor have a bonding moment in a bar. Gacy tracks Alasdair in the woods and brings him to the police. Styvesant arrests them both.
3	November 26, 2001
After Styvesant has released them, Alasdair and Gacy are confronted by ‘the Colonel’ who hired Gacy to bring Alasdair back on the right path and now fires him. Alasdair agrees to team up with Gacy to catch Sally's murderer. During a dice session led by Taylor, insecure Sam Cutter seeks the dice's help but leaves when Egon shows up, demanding his seat back; Taylor catches up with him and convinces him that the dice will set him free. Styvesant visits Taylor at his house to get some explanations, but is distracted by Taylor's flirting. When Gacy and Angela meet at the police station, Gacy instantly falls for her. Cutter has bad luck with the dice.
4	December 3, 2001
Gacy spots Taylor visiting Angela and warns her to be wary of the guy. Egon cleans up to go to a hooker bar and brings a girl back to his place, all the time watched by two policemen. In another bar, Gacy tries to offer his help to Styvesant; after he leaves, Styvesant has a go at dice to decide if he should fight his urge for alcohol or not, and ends up drunk. A new murder victim is discovered while Angela is kidnapped by a masked man.
5	December 10, 2001
Waking in a strange place, Angela finds out she knows her kidnapper. Styvesant accepts Gacy's help to find Angela. Egon is the prime suspect for the latest murder. Stuyvesant finds out the hard way he has definite enemies in the police. Angela resorts to desperate measures to escape from her captor.
6	December 17, 2001
After Angela is rescued, she has flashbacks, and then memories from her ordeal. Egon gives a six-numbered list to Styvesant. Taylor has left town; a Christian family distraught further to the loss of a child welcomes him and his comforting words. Although Styvesant has been ordered to take some vacation, he continues his investigation and comes upon some suspicious invoices in the police station. This sets him back on the killer's track.

== Production ==
Dice was co-produced by Cité-Amérique and Showcase Television in Canada and Box TV in the UK. The series was filmed in Montreal over 45 days from May to July 5, 2001. It was shot on Super 16 by DOP Jean-Pierre Trudel. The leading cast included British actors (Aidan Gillen from Queer as Folk and Gina McKee) as well as Canadian actors (Martin Cummins, Callum Keith Rennie, Brendan Fletcher, Mark McKinney, actor/jazz singer Dorothée Berryman, Gary Farmer), plus U.S. actor Fred Ward. The budget was $6 million.

A second six-hour season was planned to be filmed in the fall of 2002 but was never shot further to production issues.

== Release ==
=== Broadcast ===
Dice debuted on The Movie Network in Eastern Canada and on Movie Central in Western Canada in November 2001, and was originally aired as a six-episode season.

=== Home media ===
Dice was released on DVD in 2007 by Digital Classics DVD as a 2 x 102 mins two-parter instead of the original 6 x 34 mins episodes.

== Awards ==
Dice was nominated twice at the 17th Gemini Awards: Best Dramatic Series (producers Lorraine Richard, Greg Dummett, Gub Neal) and Best Actor in a Drama (Martin Cummins).
