= Eisenhart =

Eisenhart is a surname. Notable people with the surname include:

- Churchill Eisenhart, American mathematician
- Jake Eisenhart, American pitcher in Major League Baseball
- Luther P. Eisenhart, American mathematician
- Taylor Eisenhart, American cyclist
- Willy Eisenhart, American art writer
- 20136 Eisenhart, an asteroid
