= Rize USA =

Television production company

- Type: Limited
- Industry: Television production
- Founded: 2011
- Founder: Sheldon Lazarus (a co-venture with DCD Media)
- Headquarters: London, England & Los Angeles United States
- Key people: Sheldon Lazarus, Creative Director
- Website: Rize USA

Rize USA is a London and Los Angeles based television production company focusing on factual, factual entertainment and reality programming for the international market.

Launched in October 2011 Rize is a co-venture between Founder and Creative Director Sheldon Lazarus and TV production and distribution group DCD Media.

Rize USA is represented by Creative Artists Agency in the US and works with Caters News, the UK's leading news and picture agency which provides Rize USA with exclusive access to international news stories.

== Programmes ==
- Making Liberty for Channel 4 – 3 part series 2013
- A Very British Wedding for BBC Two – 4 part series 2013
- The Twins Who Share A Body for Channel 4 – single documentary 2012
- The Curious Case of The Clark Brothers for Channel 4 – single documentary 2012
- High School Moms for TLC/Discovery Fit & Health – 6 part series 2012
- The Girl Who Became Three Boys for Channel 4 – single documentary 2012
- Bubble Skin Man for TLC – single documentary 2012
- My Social Network Stalker: True Stories for Channel 4 – single documentary 2012
- Accused: the 74-Stone Babysitter for Channel 4 a co-production with Megalomedia UK – single documentary 2012
