= Fire Birds =

1990 film by David Green

- Theatrical release poster
- Directed by: David Green
- Screenplay by: Nick Thiel; Paul F. Edwards
- Story by: Step Tyner; John K. Swensson; Dale Dye
- Produced by: Bill Badalato
- Starring: Nicolas Cage; Tommy Lee Jones; Sean Young; Bryan Kestner
- Cinematography: Tony Imi
- Edited by: Norman Buckley; Dennis M. O'Connor; Jon Poll
- Music by: David Newman
- Production companies: Touchstone Pictures; Nova International Films
- Distributed by: Buena Vista Pictures Distribution
- Release date: May 25, 1990
- Running time: 86 minutes
- Country: United States
- Language: English
- Budget: $22 million
- Box office: $14.7 million

Fire Birds (released under the alternative title Wings of the Apache) is a 1990 American military action film directed by David Green and produced by William Badalato, Keith Barish, and Arnold Kopelson. The storyline was conceived by Step Tyner, John K. Swensson, and Dale Dye, and was developed into a screenplay written by Paul F. Edwards, Nick Thiel and David Taylor. The film stars Nicolas Cage, Tommy Lee Jones, Sean Young, Bryan Kestner, and Bert Rhine, and follows Jake Preston, a United States Army attack helicopter pilot trained by flight instructor Brad Little to battle a drug cartel in South America.

Production of the film was a co-production between the Walt Disney Studios and Nova International Films. It was commercially released under Disney's Touchstone Pictures label. The movie featured elaborate aerial stunt sequences, involving combat helicopters.

Fire Birds premiered in theaters nationwide in the United States on May 25, 1990, grossing a modest $14,760,451 in domestic ticket receipts. The film was met with negative critical reviews before its initial screening in cinemas, generally due to its melancholy dialogue and striking plot similarities to the more popular 1986 action film Top Gun.

== Plot ==
A joint U.S.–South American task force is formed to counter a powerful drug cartel smuggling narcotics to the United States. However, a U.S. Army air assault on the cartel's fortified mountain compound is repelled by Eric Stoller (Bert Rhine), a skilled mercenary pilot flying a modified MD 500 Defender called the "Scorpion", who shoots down the assault force's UH-60 Black Hawks and attacks their AH-1 Cobra escorts; Jake Preston (Nicolas Cage), the sole surviving Cobra pilot, is forced to retreat. The U.S. Army plans to deploy a team of four AH-64 Apaches, which can match the Scorpion's maneuverability and firepower, to stand a better chance against the cartel and Stoller.

Preston is enlisted in the Apache air-to-air combat training program led by flight instructor Brad Little (Tommy Lee Jones) and encounters Billie Lee Guthrie (Sean Young), his ex-girlfriend who broke off their relationship to pursue a separate career flying the OH-58 Kiowa scout helicopter, and has been assigned to assist the Apaches as their target designator and spotter. Preston's arrogance and loose improvised style earns him the respect and chagrin of Little, who helps him overcome an ocular dominance disability that interferes with the Apache's visual input.

The Drug Enforcement Administration leads a mission to apprehend the cartel's leaders, and the Apache team deploys to South America to assist them. However, their base is attacked and an Apache is destroyed, while another Apache stays behind to cover the DEA team, leaving only Preston, Little, and Guthrie to search for Stoller. Little and Guthrie locate and engage Stoller, who is supported by a pair of Saab 35 Draken fighter jets, but Little is shot down and survives, while Guthrie is targeted by Stoller. However, Preston reaches them in time and engages Stoller, who he tricks using a mountain into exposing himself to be shot down and killed, while Guthrie uses missiles from Little's downed Apache to shoot down the remaining enemy aircraft. With the cartel's air supremacy lost, they are left vulnerable for the task force to arrest their leaders and defeat the cartel. As Little is medically evacuated, he expresses pride in both Preston and Guthrie.

== Cast ==
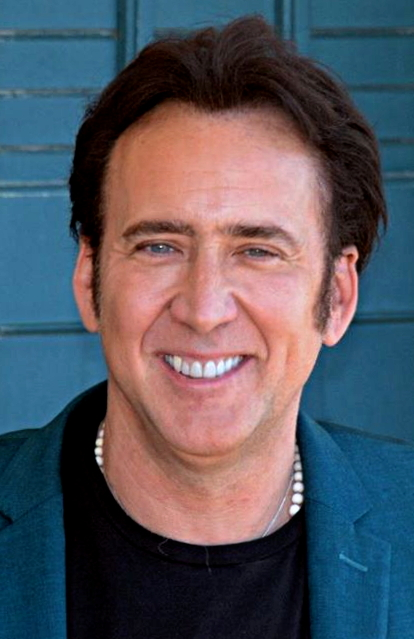
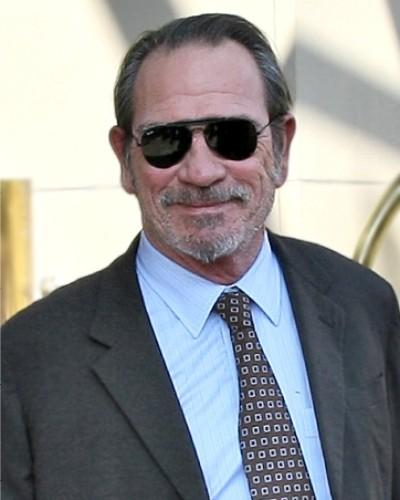
Nicolas Cage (left) and Tommy Lee Jones (right) portrayed Jake Preston and Brad Little, respectively
- Nicolas Cage as Chief Warrant Officer 2 Jake Preston
- Tommy Lee Jones as Chief Warrant Officer 4 Brad Little
- Sean Young as Chief Warrant Officer 2 Billie Lee Guthrie
- Bryan Kestner as Breaker
- Bert Rhine as Eric Stoller
- Dale Dye as Colonel A.K. McNeil
- Mary Ellen Trainor as Janet Little
- J.A. Preston as General Olcott
- Peter Onorati as Rice
- Scott Williamson as Scott "Buzz"
- Richard Soto as Captain Tejada
- Gabriel López as Johny Signaleer
- Marshall R. Teague as DEA Agent Doug Daniels
- Cylk Cozart as Dewar Protor
- Illana Diamant as Sharon Geller

== Production ==
=== Filming ===
Filming for Fire Birds was shot primarily on location in Tucson Arizona at Pima Community College as well as at Fort Hood, Texas army installation, home of the Army's Apache Training Brigade (21st Cavalry Brigade (AIR COMBAT)) . Extensive aerial stunt sequences were coordinated with the National Guard of the United States, the United States Army and the United States Air Force. Between technical advisers, stuntmen, and pilots, over 100 personnel were directly involved in the production aspects of the film. AH-64 Apache, UH-60 Blackhawk, AH-1 Cobra, MD Helicopters MD 500, OH-58 Kiowa, and Saab 35 Draken aircraft were employed during filming. Technical assistance from McDonnell Douglas service representatives was also utilized during production. The helicopter training aerial stunt sequences were designed by Richard T. Stevens who also coordinated visuals for the film, Top Gun. Scenes from the movie also feature as cover art for the MicroProse Gunship 2000 computer game.

=== Music ===
The original motion picture soundtrack for Fire Birds, composed and conducted by David Newman, was not officially released to the public when the movie was released. Intrada has since released a special collection of the soundtrack.

== Release ==
=== Home media ===
Following its cinematic release in theaters, the film was released in VHS video format on September 26, 1990. The Region 1 Code widescreen edition of the film was released on DVD in the United States on February 3, 2004. Special features for the DVD include, a closed captioned French language track, Dolby Digital Surround Sound, and a Widescreen (1.85:1) enhanced feature for 16x9 televisions. The film was released on Blu-ray by Mill Creek Entertainment on July 7, 2015, and by Kino Lorber on Jul 10, 2018. While the Mill Creek release had no special features, the Kino Lorber release includes an audio commentary by the film's director David Green and a theatrical trailer.

== Reception ==
=== Box office ===
Fire Birds premiered in cinemas on May 25, 1990, in wide release throughout the U.S. During its opening weekend, the film opened in a distant 5th place and grossed $6,358,761 in business showing at 2,006 theaters. The film Back to the Future Part III opened in first place with $23,703,060. The film's revenue dropped by 58.9% in its second week of release, earning $2,611,812. For that particular weekend, the film fell one spot to 6th place still showing in 2,006 theaters. The film Total Recall, unseated Back to the Future Part III to open in first place. For its final weekend in release, the film opened in 8th place showing at 1,539 theaters grossing $1,246,590 in box office business. The film went on to top out domestically at $14,760,451 in total ticket sales through a 3-week theatrical run. For 1990 as a whole, the film would cumulatively rank at a box office performance position of 83.

=== Critical response ===
Among critics in the U.S., the film received mostly negative reviews. Rotten Tomatoes reported that 12% of 25 sampled critics gave the film a positive review. The consensus summarizes: "Despite the talent on board, Fire Birds is little more than a subpar military adventure sporting video game-like action, outdated philosophy, and uneven acting."

Hal Hinson, writing in The Washington Post said, "Fire Birds is a primitive dogfight movie, with Nicolas Cage and Sean Young as its stars, that serves as a kind of extended commercial for the U.S. Army and its AH-64 Gunship helicopter". He bluntly noted that "it would be hard to reduce filmmaking to its basics more than Fire Birds does. It's more video game than motion picture – the first coin-operated movie." Roger Ebert in the Chicago Sun-Times offered a negative review, commenting: "It was tempting to say that I might have liked this movie more if I'd never seen Top Gun; but the fact is, if Top Gun had never been made, Fire Birds would still have seemed like a completely ordinary movie." He continued, "the aerial sequences in Top Gun are so superior to the confusing helicopter battles in this film, there's no contest there". He concluded: "I was really left unmoved by it." In the Deseret News, critic Chris Hicks wrote that the film's "predictability isn't the worst of Fire Birds' problems. The dialogue is so hokey you'll have a hard time not laughing out loud. Did I say dialogue? Make that pontificating soundbites." He further expanded on his viewpoint saying, "the most obnoxious aspect of Fire Birds, however, is how everybody tells Cage's character how wonderful he is at every opportunity — including Cage himself, who has a big scene in a chopper simulator where he screams "I am the greatest!" after every target he hits."

"the movie plays as if it had been patched together between midnight and 3 A.M. One might go along with the suggestion that the Arizona desert and the Catamarca Desert, South America, look alike, but would they really have the exact same rocks?"
—Vincent Canby, writing in The New York Times

Vincent Canby writing in The New York Times saw the film as having "many laughs, all of them unintentional" while pointing out that actor Cage "plays the sort of B-picture role that might once have suited William Gargan. Unlike Mr. Gargan, though, Mr. Cage insists on acting. Mr. Cage simply won't quit. He never listens to or sees anybody else in a scene, being too busy monitoring his own utterly mysterious, attention-getting responses." He did though compliment Jones and Young on their performances saying, "Mr. Jones and Miss Young are somewhat better. He has a secure, cool manner that registers well on the screen, and she can seem to be intelligent". The Variety Staff, felt Fire Birds had a "tongue-in-cheek aspect" and that "Camaraderie and rat-a-tat-tat dialog may have started out as fun a la Howard Hawks' classic Only Angels Have Wings but emerges at times as a satire of the genre." On Jones's performance, they noticed how he was "dead-on as the taskmaster instructor who cornily singles out Cage for rough treatment". Film critic Gene Siskel of the Chicago Tribune gave the film a thumbs down review gruffly saying, "this movie had nothing to do with the drug wars at all" and that "they could have been having a competition for the olympics". In reference to the drug wars, he openly wondered–why couldn't the movie have been "written at that hard level?" Similarly, Owen Gleiberman writing for Entertainment Weekly viewed Fire Birds as "a third-rate knockoff of Top Gun and Blue Thunder". Not impressed with the overall acting, he noted how Cage gave "a dull, one-note performance." He did however, reserve praise for the stunts and visuals in the film saying, "the climactic air battle is well staged, though without the edge-of-the-envelope dread that made the Top Gun dogfights genuinely thrilling." But in summing up his overall negativity for the movie, he expressed his dissatisfaction by lamenting, "the film practically pats itself on the back for featuring villains that have been in the news recently. Yet, with the exception of one anonymous enemy pilot, we never even get to see the bad guys. And so it's hard to work up much enthusiasm for their destruction." Film critic Leonard Maltin's review was similar: "...Standard military issue with a ruptured-duck script and a complete lack of romantic chemistry between professional rivals Cage and Young. Jones doesn't exactly evoke memories of Gregory Peck in Twelve O'Clock High when he pep-talks Cage into a 'full-tilt boogie for freedom and justice'."
