= The Last Enemy (TV series) =

- DVD Cover
- Genre: Thriller; Science fiction
- Written by: Peter Berry
- Directed by: Iain B. MacDonald
- Starring: Benedict Cumberbatch; Anamaria Marinca; Max Beesley; Robert Carlyle; Eva Birthistle; Geraldine James; Chipo Chung; Tom Fisher; James Lance; San Shella; David Harewood; Christopher Fulford; Paul Higgins; Nick Sidi
- Composer: Magnus Fiennes
- Country of origin: United Kingdom
- Original language: English
- No. of series: 1
- No. of episodes: 5

Production
- Executive producers: Patrick Irwin; Justin Thomson-Glover; Adrian Bate
- Producers: Gub Neal, Rebecca Eaton (for WGBH)
- Production locations: London, UK; Bucharest, Romania
- Camera setup: John Hembrough
- Running time: 85 minutes (Episode 1); 60 minutes (Episodes 2–5)
- Production companies: Box TV Limited; WGBH Boston

Original release
- Network: BBC One
- Release: 17 February – 16 March 2008

The Last Enemy is a five-part BBC television drama starring Benedict Cumberbatch and featuring Robert Carlyle and Max Beesley. It first aired on 17 February 2008.

== Plot ==
Set in a dystopian near-future London, The Last Enemy features the introduction of "TIA" (Total Information Awareness), a centralised database that can be used to track and monitor anybody, by putting all government and corporate – i.e. credit card and bank activity, phone use, internet use, purchases, rentals, etc. – information in one place.

The story deals with a political cover-up of a sanctioned but secret medical experiment run amok with key members of the government trying desperately to hide all evidence of their experimental batch of vaccine that seems to be causing a deadly virus. The complex story unspools to reveal the moral, social and privacy concerns of this hypothetical TIA system in a post-7/7 world, including such control mechanisms familiar to both real life and science fiction as retinal scans, fingerprint identification and ubiquitous camera and mobile phone surveillance footage.

The story is told through the eyes of a mathematical genius, Stephen Ezard, who is portrayed as a recluse showing some signs of obsessive-compulsive disorder. The shy genius overcomes his inhibitions to burrow into a highly compromised British government using his brilliance and their TIA system only to find himself ultimately trapped by the people he most trusts and to learn he is a pawn in manipulative Security State machinations which take the people he most loves from him and compromise him forever.

== Cast ==
- Benedict Cumberbatch as Stephen Ezard
- Anamaria Marinca as Yasir Anwar
- Max Beesley as Michael Ezard
- Robert Carlyle as David Russell
- Eva Birthistle as Eleanor Brooke
- Geraldine James as Barbara Turney
- David Harewood as Patrick Nye
- Christopher Fulford as George Gibbon
- Alina Serban as Nadir Al-Fulani
- Paul Higgins as Professor Lawrence Cooper
- Nicholas Sidi as Professor John Moreton
- David Calder as Lord Cawston
- James Lance as Bryan Holland
- San Shella as Andrew Wilcox
- Nikki Amuka-Bird as Susan Ross

== Viewing figures ==
Episode number	Original airing	Total viewers	Audience share (average)	Season viewer average
1	17 February 2008	4.2m	18%	2.7m
2	24 February 2008	2.5m	10%	2.7m
3	2 March 2008	2.3m	9.4%	2.7m
4	9 March 2008	2.5m	10%	2.7m
5	16 March 2008	2m	8%	2.7m

== Distribution ==
- In the United States, The Last Enemy aired on PBS's anthology show, Masterpiece Contemporary from 5 October 2008 to 2 November 2008.
- In Australia, The Last Enemy TV series commenced airing on free-to-air-TV on ABC1 (the national public television channel) from 8:30pm on 19 July 2009 and concluded on 16 August 2009.
- The Last Enemy aired on TVO in Ontario, Canada from 9:00 pm on 1–29 April 2009
- The Last Enemy aired weekly in Denmark on DR1 from 10:45 pm on 26 January 2012.
- The Last Enemy is available on Amazon Prime Video and on YouTube. As of 2020, it is available on the STV Player in Scotland. In January 2023, it was made available on ITVX and Britbox in the UK.
