= David Green (director) =

British film director

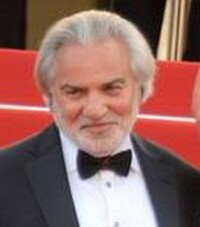
- Green at the 2015 Cannes film festival
- Born: 12 November 1948 (age 78); London, UK
- Education: Trinity College, Oxford
- Occupations: Film director, TV producer
- Known for: Founder of September Films

David Green (born 12 November 1948) is a British film director, television producer and media executive.

== Biography ==
Green, born in London, England, to Evelyn Morris and Louis Green, was educated at Bury Grammar School and at Trinity College, Oxford, from where he graduated as a Master of Arts in English Language and Literature.

He joined Yorkshire Television straight from Oxford and, within a year, became the youngest ever YTV programme director, cutting his directorial teeth on the launch of Emmerdale (60 episodes) before going on to direct 29 one-hour episodes of Whicker's World, a three-part American medical series with Austin Mitchell, two European political documentaries narrated by Robert Kee and a film about Elvis fronted by David Frost; also, documentaries about Sir John Gielgud and Lord Mountbatten of Burma.

Green is now a major figure in the British and American film and television industries, having worked on motion pictures and TV projects in virtually every genre. His movie‑directing credits include the award-winning romantic comedy and crime-drama Buster (4 awards) featuring Phil Collins and Julie Walters, and the $22m action adventure Wings of the Apache starring Nicolas Cage, Tommy Lee Jones and Sean Young (released in the USA as Fire Birds by Touchstone). Other feature film directing credits include the psychological thriller Breathtaking with Joanne Whalley and Jamie Foreman, and the comedy Car Trouble featuring Julie Walters and Ian Charleson.

For television, Green has directed over 100 dramas and documentaries, including The Golden Land trilogy for BBC1, The Boy in the Bubble and A Dying Art for ITV, Wilfred and Eileen(4 eps) and East Lynne for BBC Drama, and the ITV movie 1914 All Out, which was awarded the Public Prize at the Reims Festival of Television. Other TV drama directing credits include Nobody's House(4 eps) for ITV, and The Chinese Detective for BBC1.

Green was also a leading commercials director with James Garrett & Partners for whom he filmed over 50 campaigns, including Sir Peter Ustinov presenting Masterpiece Theatre for Mobil, Sir Jackie Stewart for Ford Motors, and the award-winning Red Mountain coffee campaign.

From 1992 Green was founder (and until 2007, chairman) of September Films, an independent film and television production company with offices in London and Los Angeles. The company made over two thousand hours of prime time television, including the landmark Hollywood Women series, which was the first part of a ten-season Hollywood franchise for ITV, and ten seasons of the American flagship show Bridezillas - both of which he created; also, the groundbreaking drama The Investigator for Channel 4.

The company's feature films include the Oscar-nominated Solomon & Gaenor (7 awards) and House of America (6 awards). September Films was also awarded the Montreux Rose d'Or for Ozzy Osbourne Uncut. He was executive producer of all three award-winning productions.

Green joined production and distribution Group DCD Media plc in 2007, when September Films was acquired by the multi-company media conglomerate. He took on the role of DCD group Chief Creative Officer before becoming CEO in 2009 and Executive Chairman in 2012. He stepped down in 2013, and is now living in LA producing and directing again.

In 2018, he also became Chairman of UK scripted drama company Three Tables Productions.

In August 2023, Green and actress, Jane Seymour, separated after living in Malibu together for over 9 years. They originally met in 1981 when he cast her in a BBC film he was directing about Mata Hari which was cancelled.

Green married Jane Emerson in 1982 (divorced 2014) and have three children: Jessica, Samuel and Jacob.

He is a lifelong supporter of Manchester City Football Club.
