= Yulia Tsvetkova =

Russian feminist activist (born 1993)

- Юлия Цветкова
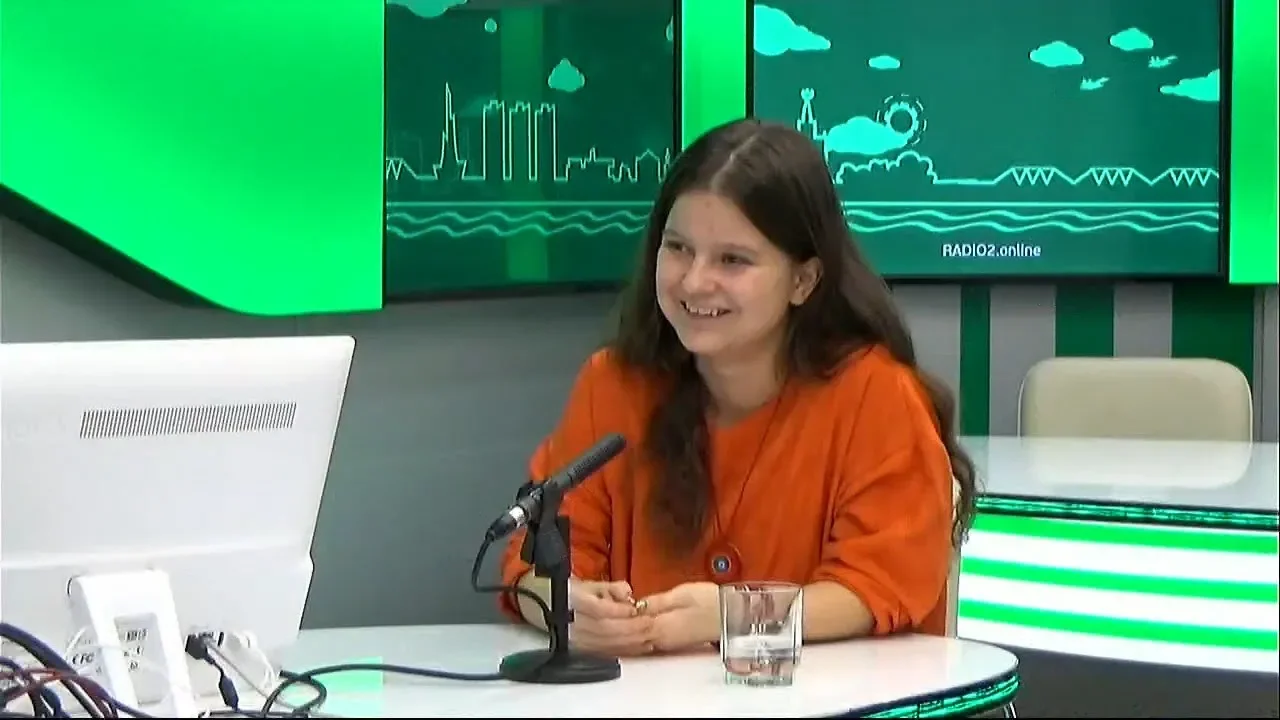
- Born: 23 May 1993 (age 33); Komsomolsk-on-Amur
- Occupations: Feminist Activist, Artist, Theater Director
- Awards: Index on Censorship Freedom of Expression Awards Arts.
- Website: https://www.freetsvet.net/

Yulia Vladimirovna Tsvetkova (Russian: Ю́лия Влади́мировна Цветко́ва; born 23 May 1993) is a Russian artist and activist from Komsomolsk-on-Amur. She is the organizer of the activist art festival Saffron Flower (in Russian) and the founder of the "Woman--not doll" project which destigmatizes the female body. She is also the director of the "Merak" youth theater. On 11 February 2020, she was recognized as a political prisoner.

== Biography ==
Tsvetkova’s mother, Anna Leonidovna Khodyreva, was born and raised in the city of Kirov. Khodyreva is a teacher by training, and also studied set design. She worked as a director’s assistant at the National Theatre for many years. Khodyreva founded the first early childhood education center in Komsomolsk-on-Amur in 1996.

From a young age, Tsvetkova was engaged in creative endeavors. By the age of thirteen she had her first solo exhibition at the Komsomolsk-on-Amur modern art gallery. For several years she hosted "Amur Stars," a youth program on the local television channel. She was designated as one of the gifted children of the Khabarovsk Territory.

At the age of 15, Tsvetkova left school with dreams of becoming a choreographer. She moved to Moscow at the age of 17, where she trained at a variety of dance schools, studying modern dance. Later, she studied martial arts and parkour. She received her ADAPT coaching certification from the London-based Parkour Generations, but was forced to end her sporting career due to injury.

Tsvetkova began studying direction and screenwriting at the London Film School, but for personal reasons was forced to leave her studies and return to her hometown of Komsomolsk-on-Amur.

Between 2013 and 2017 she conducted English, theatre, and dance classes for children.

=== Activism ===
In 2018, Tsvetkova began her activism. She wrote and lectured on feminism, LGBT rights, anti-militarism, and the environment. In September 2018, she opened a city community center for civic initiatives. The cultural center hosted weekly lectures, "Living Library" sessions, support groups for schoolchildren and mothers, environmental actions, and an inclusive market for handmade goods.

In 2018 she founded the Merak Theatre Company, which staged original productions. The theatre was non-hierarchical, with actors active in the production process. Shows included elements of improvisation, dance, and forum theatre. In 2018, Merak staged three performances: a dance based on Stravinsky’s Sacred Spring, a poetic performance about growing up, named Evolution and an English-language show titled The History of English. In 2018, Merak performed at the largest venues in the city. The History of English was named one of the city’s top ten major productions.

During the second half of 2018, the theatre was preparing four productions for the Color of Saffron activist art festival: a dance about the Prague Spring, a performance on prosecution titled "The Untouchables," a satirical anti-war performance named "Bless the Lord and His Ammunition," and a humorous performance titled "Pink and Blue" about the dangers of gender stereotypes.

At the beginning of February, the theatre administrator received a call from a city official who asked about the performances and the festival, inquiring about the anti-war performance. The next day, the Merak’s venue had its permits revoked. Tsvetkova appealed to the media to publicize this illegal interference into the youth festival’s activity. After receiving media attention, Tsvetkova and the theatre administrator were summoned to speak to city officials. The officials asked that they not spread negative publicity about the city, and to not conduct performances based on anti-militaristic themes or about persecution.

The theatre found a new venue, and preparations for the festival continued. The second week of March police arrived at the local school and interrogated the theatre’s underage actors. They conducted these interrogations without the presence of the children’s parents, and asked them about "homosexual propaganda" and extremism. The next day, the owner of the festival’s new venue was summoned to speak to city officials, where she was told that she would be stripped of her property should she hold an "LGBT Festival."

Tsvetkova decided that the performances should be shown regardless, but to a closed audience of the performer’s parents, and select members of the press. The audience numbered 15 spectators, and the performance was filmed.

In June, Merak Theatre Company released "Fairy Tales – Realistic Tales," an English performance about Russian fairy tales. In November 2019, the recording of the performance of "Pink and Blue" was screened at the St. Petersburg Feminist Festival Eve’s Ribs. The show was also attended by the police.

On 3 December 2019, the Theatre Critics Association published an open letter in support of Tsvetkova’s artistic, educational, and civil activities.

=== Criminal charges ===
Yulia was accused of illegal production and traffic of pornographic material through the Internet. The prosecutor requested a prison sentence from 2 to 6 years for her for managing a feminist website "The Vagina Monologues", likening its content to pornography.

She was under house arrest since 22 November 2019. The investigation against her began on 24 October 2019 after a report from well-known "Jihadist Moral" activist Timur Bulatov. On 13 December 2019, while under house arrest, Yulia Tsvetkova was declared guilty according to the homophobic "gay propaganda" law for committing an administrative offense by promoting non-traditional sexual relations between minors through the Internet and was fined 50.000 rubles for publishing content regarding the rights of LGBT groups on the web.

She was declared a political prisoner by the Memorial society.

According to Memorial's human rights advocates, the criminal prosecution against Yulia is connected to her public position and the importance of her role in the feminist movement.

On 17 January 2020 Yulia was informed of a new charge included in the same report for her picture with the text: "Family is where love is. I support LGTB+ families". On 10 July, was fined 75,000 roubles ($1,000) on charges of spreading "gay propaganda" among minors by publishing drawings of same-sex couples with children online. On 24 February 2020, Tsvetkova informed her friends and followers on social networks about the threats and blackmail coming from the extremist homophobic group "The Saw" ("Пила").

On 26 February 2020, Tsvetkova filed a complaint against the Investigation Committee regarding the illegitimate restriction of her right to medical care during her house arrest.

On 2 March 2020, the police informed of a new complaint from Bulatov against Yulia's mother - Anna Khodyreva, in which he accuses her of propagandizing unconventional values.

On 16 April 2020, Yulia Tsvetkova received the international award "Index on Censorship" under the "Art" category, becoming the second Russian woman to receive this award after Anna Politkovskaya.

On 27 June 2020, over 30 female activists detained after one-person protests in support of Yulia Tsvetkova in Moscow. On 7 July 2020, the third administrative case opened against Tsvetkova under Russia’s "gay propaganda law"

She was on the list of the BBC's 100 Women announced on 23 November 2020.

Her trial was being held behind closed doors, with the next hearing set to take place in May 2021.

On 1 May 2021, Yulia Tsvetkova began a hunger strike to demand that the trial not be delayed, to open the court to the public and to allow a public defender.

On 15 July 2022, Yulia Tsvetkova was acquitted by the court.
