= DCD Media =

Independent television production and distribution group

DCD Media plc
- Company type: Public
- Traded as: LSE: DCD
- Industry: Mass Media
- Founded: 1999; 27 years ago
- Headquarters: London & Glasgow, United Kingdom; Los Angeles, United States
- Key people: David Craven (CEO)
- Subsidiaries: List of Subsidiaries: September Films; Matchlight; Prospect Pictures; Rize USA; DCD Rights; DCD Publishing; Sequence Post
- Website: www.dcdmedia.co.uk

DCD Media plc (formerly Digital Classics plc) is a UK and US based independent television production and distribution group headquartered in London and with offices in Los Angeles, London and Glasgow. The Group comprises a number of production companies working across all non fiction genres on both sides of the Atlantic, from primetime documentary, factual, factual entertainment and reality to drama documentary.

The production arm is supported by 2 international rights companies – DCD Rights and DCD Publishing. The Company floated on the London Stock Exchange's Alternative Investment Market in December 1999 and has since then developed through organic growth and acquisitions.

== Group structure ==
Productions companies:

- September Films
- Matchlight
- Prospect
- Rize USA

Distribution companies:

- DCD Rights (formerly known as NBD Television)
- DCD Publishing

Post production companies:

- Sequence Post

== Milestones ==
Date	Milestone
January 2013	David Craven becomes Executive Chairman, Richard McGuire steps down from the Board
October 2012	DCD Media sells DCD Rights
August 2012	Timeweave plc acquires 49.99% stake in DCD following the appointment of David Craven and Richard McGuire as Directors
March 2012	DCD Media adds post production to the range of its TV production businesses with the acquisition of UK company Sequence Post Production
February 2012	DCD Media appoints Sammy Nourmand as CEO and David Green as Executive Chairman.
November 2011	DCD Media appoints a new board of directors, adding John Cusins as Non-Executive Chairman and Sammy Nourmand as Executive Director
September 2011	DCD Media co-ventures with Sheldon Lazarus in a new transatlantic television production company, Rize USA, focusing on factual, factual entertainment and reality programming for the international market
March 2009	Expansion with the creation of a new JV Scottish-based production company - Matchlight - with some of Scotland's leading programme makers
September 2008	Launch of DCD Publishing, a division set to exploit book publishing, merchandising and licensing rights
August 2008	DCD Media announces transformatory investment fund deal for its TV distribution arm which is rebranded DCD Rights
August 2007	DCD Media acquires three production companies - Prospect Pictures, September Films and West Park Pictures
July 2006	Merging of distribution divisions into one single operating unit NBD Television which was later rebranded as DCD Rights.
March 2006	Digital Classics plc is rebranded DCD Media plc to reflect the wider focus of the enlarged Group, which has now progressed from a classical music and arts specialist to encompass wider popular entertainment genres.
January 2006	Acquisition of Done and Dusted, an independent television producer of pop and rock music and other staged event programming
December 2005	The Company acquires 2 companies simultaneously as part of a strategic move to build a substantial TV production & distribution business: Box TV, an independent producer of award-winning drama programmes and NBD Television, now rebranded DCD Rights an international distribution company operating predominantly in the music market
May 2005	The Board announces to the market it is implementing an aggressive acquisition strategy with regard to private independent production companies. The group is seeking independent production companies to fit strategically alongside its existing subsidiaries
February 2005	Appointment of David Elstein as a Chairman, former Chief Executive of Channel 5 for four years where he led the channel through its launch in 1997
March 2004	The Company acquires RM Associates Distribution Limited, an international distribution group specializing in music and arts documentary and performance programming
November 2000	Acquisition of Iambic Productions, a company specializing in producing arts programmes for television and other media and in selling related rights. This becomes the Company's primary activity
December 1999	The Company is admitted to trading on the Alternative Investment Market (AIM) on 13 December 1999. At this time, the Company's aim is to become a leading website for audio-visual performing arts content.
