= Christine Battersby =

British philosopher (born 1946)

- Born: 3 March 1946 (age 80)

Education
- Thesis: Hume’s Easy Philosophy: Ease and Inertia in Hume’s Newtonian Science of Man (1978)

Philosophical work
- Era: 21st-century philosophy
- Region: Western philosophy
- Institutions: University of Warwick
- Main interests: Feminist aesthetics

Christine Battersby FRSA (born 3 March 1946) is a British philosopher and Reader Emerita in Philosophy at the University of Warwick. She was the visiting Fleishhacker Chair of Philosophy at the University of San Francisco during April 2013. Battersby is a Fellow of the Royal Society of Arts. She is known for her research on feminist aesthetics.

== Books ==
- The Sublime, Terror and Human Difference, Routledge, 2007
- The Phenomenal Woman: Feminist Metaphysics and the Patterns of Identity, Routledge, 1998
- Gender and Genius: Towards a Feminist Aesthetics, Indiana University Press, 1990
