= High School Moms =

- Genre: Reality
- Country of origin: United States
- Original language: English
- No. of seasons: 1
- No. of episodes: 6

Production
- Production location: Denver, Colorado
- Production company: Rize USA

Original release
- Network: TLC
- Release: August 12 – September 20, 2012

High School Moms is an American reality television series on TLC. The series debuted on August 12, 2012. Encores of the series originally aired on Discovery Fit & Health.

== Premise ==
The series follows the daily lives of those who work and attend Florence Crittenton High School, a school that exclusively caters to teenage mothers and currently pregnant girls.

== Episodes ==
No.	Title	Original release date	US viewers (millions)
1	"Pregnant at 14"	August 12, 2012	0.997
2	"Everyone Going to Prom?"	August 19, 2012	0.647
3	"School of Broken Hearts"	August 30, 2012	N/A
4	"Breaking the Cycle"	September 6, 2012	N/A
5	"Loud Labor"	September 13, 2012	N/A
6	"Graduation"	September 20, 2012	N/A

== Reception ==
Melissa Camacho of Common Sense Media gave High School Moms a 3 out of 5 stars.

== See also ==
- Teen Mom
- Teen Mom 2
