= Afghanistan: The Great Game – A Personal View by Rory Stewart =

- Genre: Documentary
- Written by: Rory Stewart
- Directed by: Iain Scollay; Ollie Lambert
- Presented by: Rory Stewart
- Country of origin: United Kingdom
- Original language: English
- No. of series: 1
- No. of episodes: 2

Production
- Executive producer: Ross Wilson
- Producer: Iain Scollay
- Cinematography: Richard Rankin; Jonathan Young
- Running time: 55-60 mins
- Production company: Matchlight

Original release
- Network: BBC
- Release: 28 May – 30 May 2012

Afghanistan: The Great Game – A Personal View by Rory Stewart is a 2012 documentary in two parts written and presented by Rory Stewart that tells the story of foreign intervention by Britain, Russia, and the United States in Afghanistan from the 19th century to the present day. It won the BAFTA Scotland award for best Factual Series in 2012.

== Episode one ==
In episode one Stewart tells the story of British interventions in Afghanistan in the 19th century when the British Empire became obsessed with the idea that their rival, Russia expanding south, was considering the invasion of Afghanistan as a staging post for an attack on British India. It was a period of mutual suspicion and paranoia that later became known as "The Great Game". Stewart tells the story of explorer and spy Alexander Burnes whose book when translated into French and read by Russia alerted them to believe Britain was expanding north and then Stewart relates the decision-making that led to the first British invasion of Afghanistan and the three Anglo-Afghan wars fought in this era. After the First World War an Afghan elite, led by King Amanullah Khan, made a futile attempt to impose western inspired ideas and modernity such as western dress and education of girls in a conservative country that forced the king into exile.

== Episode two ==
This episode Stewart tells the story of Soviet and United States involvement in Afghanistan. From 1928 until 1978 there had been relative peace and in the 1960s and '70s was on the hippie trail but the Cold War was at its height with Afghanistan surrounded by American allies Iran and Pakistan. In northern Afghanistan, Soviet aid was provided and in southern Afghanistan American aid. In Kabul Islamists and Communists vied for supremacy and when the Communists took control in 1978 they asked the Soviet Union for military assistance. Reluctantly they agreed after Afghan leader Hafizullah Amin went to Moscow in 1979. 80,000 troops entered Afghanistan and the United States saw a chance for revenge against the Soviets who aided the Communists in the Vietnam War. The CIA covertly through General Muhammad Zia-ul-Haq, President of Pakistan, provided modern weaponry. Charlie Wilson and socialite Joanne Herring were prominent in the raising of $9 billion covertly passed to Afghanistan. In 1988 the Soviets pulled out and the country descended into a vicious five-year civil war that the Taliban emerged victorious imposing strict Islamic law. Afghanistan became a safe haven for many terrorist groups and when the twin towers were attacked in New York the United States and its coalition allies entered Afghanistan in large numbers and as Rory Stewart points to the history of Afghanistan, it is an easy country to enter but a difficult one to leave.
