= Simon, Simon =

1970 British film by Graham Stark

- DVD cover
- Directed by: Graham Stark
- Written by: Graham Stark and Dave Freeman
- Produced by: Peter Shillingford
- Starring: Graham Stark; Norman Rossington; John Junkin; Julia Foster
- Cinematography: Harvey Harrison; Derek Vanlint
- Edited by: Bunny Warren
- Music by: Denis King
- Release date: 1970
- Running time: 32 min.
- Country: United Kingdom
- Language: English

Simon, Simon is a 1970 British sound effect comedy short film directed by Graham Stark and starring Stark, Norman Rossington, John Junkin and Julia Foster. The film features a host of cameo appearances by veteran British comedians. It was written by Stark and Dave Freeman. The title comes from the Simon hydraulic platforms used in the film.

== Plot ==
Two handymen cause chaos on a new crane while haphazardly trying to accomplish jobs for their ever more frustrated boss.

== Cast ==
- Graham Stark as 1st workman
- Julia Foster as 1st typist
- Norman Rossington as fireman
- John Junkin as 2nd workman (driver)
- Paul Whitsun-Jones as the boss
- Audrey Nicholson as 2nd typist
- Kenneth Earle as thief
- Tommy Godfrey as cashier
- Tony Blackburn as fireman
- Michael Caine as himself
- David Hemmings as man in car with posters
- Bob Monkhouse as photographer
- Eric Morecambe as roof tiler
- Ernie Wise as painter/decorator
- Pete Murray as fireman
- Peter Sellers as man with two cars
- Bernie Winters as man on roof with book

== Release ==
It was released in 1970 as the supporting film to Leo the Last.

== Critical reception ==
The Monthly Film Bulletin wrote: "With its squad of incompetent firemen, this mimed comedy was clearly intended to revive the silent slapstick tradition of the Keystone Cops. But the enterprise lacks pace. The film alternates between mechanical sight gags and an indulgent sentimentality underlined by Dennis King's irrepressibly cute score. And while celebrated friends of the director make lightning appearances that should gratify the star spotters, the mime style of the principals involves much tiresome hand-wringing, eye-rolling and exaggerated mugging."

The Radio Times Guide to Films gave the film 2/5 stars, writing: "Unsung character actor Graham Stark made his debut as the writer and director of this fond, if laboured tribute to the silent slapstick style of the Keystone Kops. Comedy stars crop up in cameo roles, as does movie star Michael Caine. But the main focus falls on the rivalry between Stark's council workman and fireman Norman Rossington, as they woo typist Julia Foster. The mugging mime and the excessive crane shots soon become wearisome, but it's still fun."

== Home media ==
The film was released on DVD in 2007 by Digital Classics.
