= September Films =

British television and film production company

- Type: Subsidiary
- Industry: Film; Television
- Founded: 1992; 34 years ago
- Founder: David Green
- Headquarters: London, United Kingdom
- Services: Film production; Television production
- Parent: DCD Media

September Films is a British independent television and film production company, which is a division of UK independent production and distribution group DCD Media. It specialises in factual entertainment, documentaries and features, reality programming and entertainment formats.

It was founded in 1992 by feature film director David Green, who devised the groundbreaking Hollywood Women series that launched the company, and was acquired in August 2007 by DCD Media. Having produced over 2,000 hours of primetime television since its creation, September has offices in London and Los Angeles.

In recent years, September Films has expanded into non-fiction genres and formats with the appointment of a new generation of creative executives.

== Programmes ==
- Billy the Exterminator for A&E Network (formerly "The Exterminators")
- Bridezillas for WE tv and Five
- Marriage Boot Camp for WE tv
- Penn & Teller: Fool Us for ITV1/The CW
- Richard Hammond's Blast Lab for CBBC
- Alan Whicker's Journey of a Lifetime for BBC2
- Pregnant Man for Discovery Health Channel US and Channel 4
- Boys Joined at the Head for Five and Discovery Health
- Hollywood Lives for ITV
- Generation Xcess for ITV
- Beauty and the Geek for Channel 4
- Weighing In for BBC2
- Messages from 9/11 for A&E
- MallCops Mall of America for TLC Network
