= The Story of Women and Art =

UK television program

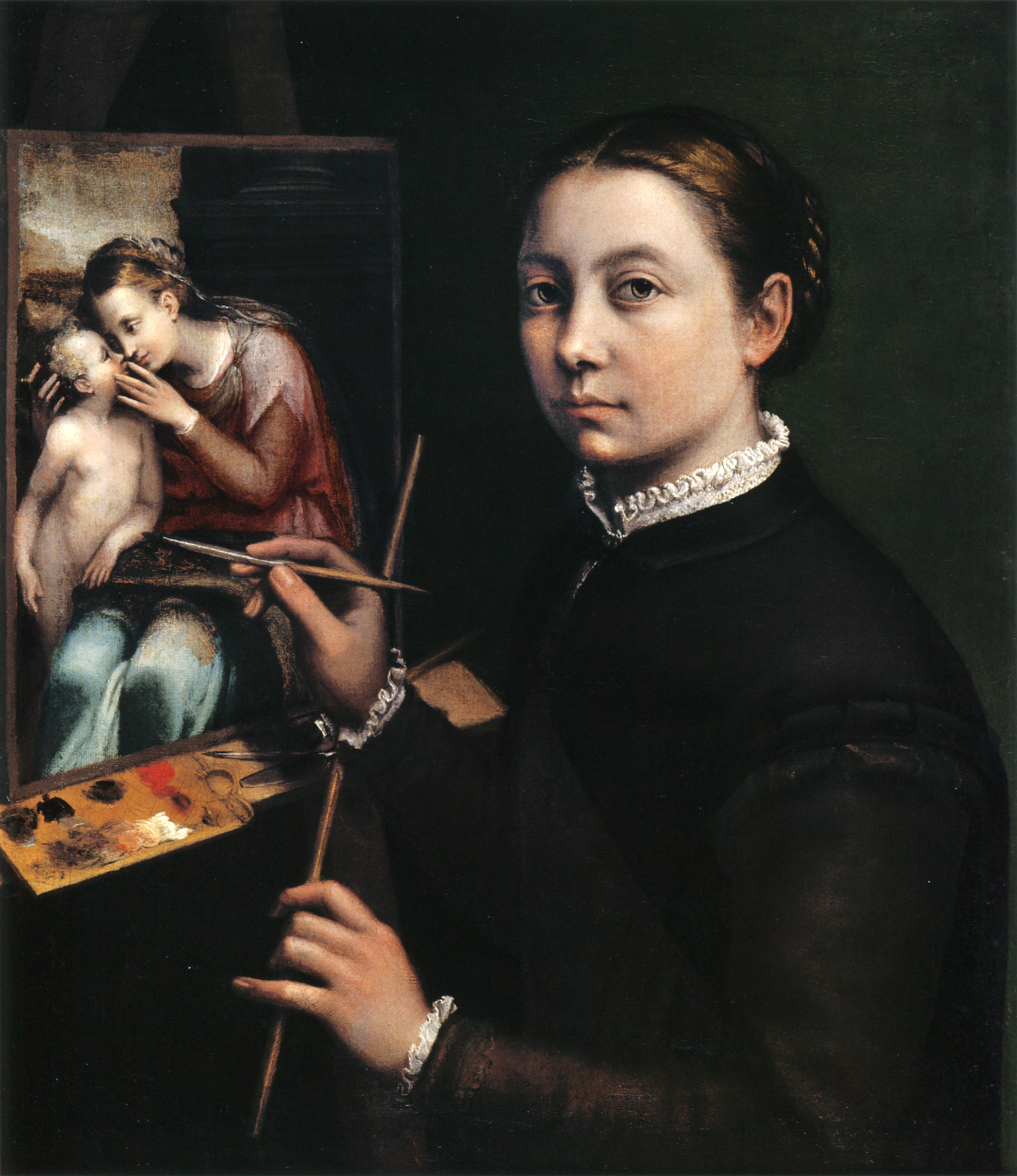
- 1556 self-portrait of Sofonisba Anguissola, featured in The Story of Women and Art.
- Genre: Art documentary
- Presented by: Professor Amanda Vickery
- Country of origin: United Kingdom
- Original language: English
- No. of episodes: 3

Production
- Running time: 60 minutes

Original release
- Network: BBC Two
- Release: May 2014

The Story of Women and Art is a television documentary series, consisting of three one-hour episodes, on the history of women artists in Europe from the Renaissance onwards, first broadcast in the United Kingdom on BBC Two in May 2014. The series is presented by Professor Amanda Vickery.

Artists featured include Properzia de' Rossi, Sofonisba Anguissola, Lavinia Fontana, Anne Seymour Damer, Angelica Kauffman, and the 17th-century Dutch paper cutter Joanna Koerten. Episode 3 covered Lady Butler, Berthe Morisot, Gertrude Jekyll, Karin Larsson, Madeleine Vionnet, and Georgia O'Keeffe. The programme was well received by some critics, but criticized by others.

== See also ==
- List of 20th-century women artists
