= Feminist aesthetics =

Perspectives in art regarding gender

Feminist aesthetics first emerged in the 1970s and refers not to a particular aesthetic or style but to perspectives that question assumptions in art and aesthetics concerning gender-role stereotypes, or gender. Feminist aesthetics has a relationship to philosophy.

== Historical and philosophical background ==
The historical philosophical views of what beauty, the arts, and sensory experiences are, relate to the idea of aesthetics. Aesthetics looks at styles of production. In particular, feminists argue that despite seeming neutral or inclusive, the way people think about art and aesthetics is influenced by gender roles. Feminist aesthetics is a tool for analyzing how art is understood using gendered issues. A person's gender identity affects the ways in which they perceive art and aesthetics because of their subject position and that perception is influenced by power. The ways in which people see art is also influenced by social values such as class and race. One's subject position in life changes the way art is perceived because of people's different knowledge's about life and experiences. In the way that feminist history unsettles traditional history, feminist aesthetics challenge philosophies of beauty, the arts and sensory experience. Starting in the 18th century, ideas of aesthetic pleasure have tried to define "taste". Kant and Hume both argued that there was universal good taste, which made aesthetic pleasure. A feminist line of logic about these attempts is that, because fine art was a leisure activity at this time, those who could afford to make art or produce supposed universal truths about how it is enjoyed would do so in a way that creates class and gender division. Even when those universal aesthetes did address gender, they categorized aesthetics into two categories: beauty and sublimity; with beauty being small and delicate (feminine) and sublimity being large and awe-inspiring (masculine). Feminist aesthetics analyzes why "feminine" traits are subservient compared to "masculine" traits in art and aesthetics.

== Feminist analysis of aesthetics ==
Another explanation for the male-domination of forming aesthetic theory is that feminists express their aesthetic pleasure differently than non-feminist aesthetes for "whom the pleasure of theorizing [...] is a form of jouissance". Instead, a feminist is less likely to view the object as a disinterested interpreter, and intellectualize the sensation (Hilde Hein). Morse discusses how art is a social institution. The influence of institutions comes from those who created the structure, which is mainly by men. From a spectator's point of view, men looking at women, compared to women looking at women, produces different social implications. When understanding a feminist perspective, Morse discusses the ideas of "self-defined" and "self-determined" art by women artists. Critics of feminist art argue that politics have no place in art, however, many art forms contain politics, but because of their subject position, the critics are unable to perceive it.

The language used when talking about aesthetics in art is limited. The lexicon is limited because it does not include femme and women identifying language. The language that does exist separates them as "female" artist. The examination of the need for there to be a separate field of feminist aesthetics is discussed. If there is a separate field, women's art gets defined as feminist, then it assumes that the "normal" and all other art is automatically categorized as masculine.

Some postmodernist feminists engage in kalliphobia (a rejection of the objective concept of beauty), arguing that the judgment of beauty is highly gendered and often rooted in misogyny. Other feminists endorse a "return to beauty," allowing for beauty to exist as a measuring stick for aesthetic judgment, while acknowledging that such judgment is subjective and contingent upon social mores.

The idea of the creative genius is inspected in feminist aesthetics. In particular, women artists are often excluded from being creative or artistic geniuses. This exclusion in part stems from the traditional masculine definitions of genius. Christine Battersby has critiqued women being excluded from being known as geniuses because female artists will be separated from their art, and instead their art will be called genius, instead of the artist. However, women were also excluded because they lacked the opportunities for artistic education required to be recognized as artists and geniuses. In addition, the idea of the creative genius itself celebrates individualism – which Battersby calls "a kind of masculine heroism" – and overlooks the work of joint collaborations.

Linda Nochlin, an art historian, states that art history comes from a Western male point of view, which creates a dominant way of viewing art. Nochlin questions why there have been no "great" women artists in art history and understands that this is due to the influence of Western males within the field of art. Feminist art historian Griselda Pollock argues that the Western canon is a structure of exclusion, subordination, and reproduction of sexual difference.

=== Arts vs crafts ===
Aesthetic theories that make a distinction between "arts" and "crafts" can be viewed as anti-feminist. Here, art usually refers to fine art and crafts refers to everything else which has everyday aesthetics. Art forms traditionally used by women, such as embroidery or sewing, are perceived as crafts and not art, because of their domestic uses. Feminist aesthetics focuses on all objects created by women, whether or not they are seen as "art". Since those craft practices occur in the home where many women continue to work, their creativity is overlooked by the perception of "art", because their domain is marginalized.

== Relevant groups ==
The Guerrilla Girls are a contemporary an activist group that focuses on how feminism plays a role in public art. Their relationship to feminist aesthetics is relevant because they expose gender and ethnic bias, as well as corruption in the art, film and pop culture worlds. The group draws attention to the idea that women are not equally valued in these areas and fight to improve gender equality.

== Feminist art criticism ==
Another area of study that is tied to feminist aesthetics is feminist art criticism. This area of study can focus on female body imagery, goddess imagery, personal narratives, and devaluation of "individual solitary genius."

The nude is a genre of art highly criticized by feminists, who argue that the depiction of the female nude eroticizes the traditional gender hierarchy and contributes to systemic sex/gender inequality socially and psychologically.

== See also ==
- Guerrilla Girls
