= Miriam van Rijsingen =

Dutch art historian

Miriam I. D. van Rijsingen is a Dutch art historian and specialist in feminist art history.
