= Willy Eisenhart =

American journalist (1946–1995)

- Born: William S. Eisenhart III; August 24, 1946
- Died: June 25, 1995 (aged 48); New York City
- Education: Princeton University
- Occupation: Writer
- Writing career
- Subject: Art
- Notable work: The World of Donald Evans
- Notable awards: American Book Award (1992)

William S. Eisenhart III (August 24, 1946 – June 25, 1995) was an American writer on art.

== Biography ==
Eisenhart was born in York, Pennsylvania. He attended Exeter, and then Princeton University where he majored in English, and then moved to Manhattan in 1970. He worked on productions of the Nederlands Dans Theater and the Opera Theater of St. Louis. His biography The World of Donald Evans won the American Book Award in 1982.

Eisenhart died in New York City at the age of 48 on June 25, 1995, as the result of a fall from the roof of his home.
