= Matchlight =

- Type: Limited
- Industry: Television production
- Founded: 2009
- Headquarters: Glasgow, Scotland

Matchlight is an independent television production company based in Glasgow. The company specializes in observational documentaries, history, arts, current affairs and popular factual television. The company works for many broadcasters in the UK including BBC One, ITV1, BBC Two, BBC Three, BBC Four, BBC Scotland, Channel 4 and Channel 5.

In 2010, Matchlight's At Home with the Georgians was nominated in the History category in the Royal Television Society's Programme Awards. In 2012, Matchlight won a Scottish BAFTA award for Afghanistan: The Great Game - A Personal View by Rory Stewart (Best Factual Series). Matchlight's Ted Hughes: Stronger Than Death, directed by Richard Curson Smith, won the Best Arts Documentary at the 2016 Celtic Media Festival. The film was also nominated for a Grierson Award in 2016 and a British Academy Scotland (BAFTA) in the same year. Transplant Tales, produced by Matchlight in 2015, was nominated in the Factual Series category at the British Academy Scotland (BAFTA) Awards 2015 and the RTS Scotland Awards 2016. My Baby, Psychosis and Me co-produced by Matchlight and Sprout and directed by Rebecca Burrell won the Documentary prize at the Mind Media Awards 2016.

Matchlight is led by Ross Wilson, Creative Director, who has received BAFTA and Emmy awards as a documentary film maker. Matchlight was initially formed as a joint venture with DCD Media. Following a management buy-out in 2014, Matchlight is owned and operated by Ross Wilson, Jacqui Hayden and David Smith.

Management

- Creative Directors: Ross Wilson
- Managing Director: David Smith
- Development Director: Jacqui Hayden
