= Box TV Limited =

UK-based production company

Box TV
- Type: Independent; Parent group DCD Media plc
- Industry: Television production
- Founded: 2000
- Headquarters: London, England, United Kingdom
- Website: box-tv.co.uk

Box TV Limited is a UK-based production company specialising in film and television drama, and a subsidiary of the production and distribution group DCD Media. It was founded in 2000 by Gub Neal, a former head of drama at Channel 4 and controller of drama at Granada Television. Box TV's core team also included executive producers Justin Thomson-Glover and Patrick Irwin. Adrian Bate, formerly head of film and drama at Zenith Entertainment, joined the team in October 2006.

Box TV was acquired in December 2005 by DCD Media and merged into DCD Drama, after which its core team left.

== Programmes ==
Productions by Box TV include:

- Affinity, a one-off drama starring Zoe Tapper and Anna Madeley, broadcast on ITV1, based on the novel by Sarah Waters
- The Last Enemy starring Benedict Cumberbatch, Max Beesley and Robert Carlyle, broadcast on BBC One
- The Wind in the Willows, an adaptation of the children's novel by Kenneth Grahame, starring Matt Lucas and Bob Hoskins, broadcast on BBC One as a Christmas drama in 2006 (audience 5.3 million)
- Bon Voyage broadcast on ITV1 in October 2006 (audience 4.4 million)
- Sweeney Todd, starring Ray Winstone, broadcast on BBC One in December 2005 (audience 6.6 million)
- Gunpowder, Treason & Plot

== Awards ==
In June 2008, Anna Madeley won the Best Actress award at the Monte Carlo Television Festival for her role in Affinity. In June 2007, Bon Voyage won the Best Mini-Series award at the Monte Carlo Television Festival. Other awards include the FIPA Awards 2005, where Gunpowder, Treason & Plot received the Fipa d'Or.
