= List of Afghanistan War (2001–2021) documentaries =

List of documentary films and TV specials about the 2001–2021 War in Afghanistan.

- Afghan Massacre: The Convoy of Death (documentary film, 2002)
- The Chicken Commander (Icelandic documentary film, 2004)
- Enemies of Happiness (documentary film, 2006)
- Commando: On the Front Line (British ITV TV series, 9 episodes, 2007)
- Taking on the Taliban (BBC Panorama TV episode, 05-11-2007)
- Taxi to the Dark Side (documentary film, 2007)
- The General's War (BBC, 2007)
- Above and Beyond (TV special, 2008)
- Ross Kemp in Afghanistan (British Documentary series, 2008)
- Afghanistan: The Forgotten War (PBS Now TV episode, 17-07-2008)
- Three Bloody Summers (BBC Panorama TV episode, 03-11-2008)
- Jack: A Soldier's Story (BBC Panorama TV episode, 07-11-2008)
- Battle Scarred (TV special, 2009)
- Obama's War (PBS Frontline TV episode, 2009)
- Rethink Afghanistan (documentary film, 2009)
- Armadillo (film, 2010)
- The Battle for Marjah (HBO documentary film, 2010)
- Afghanistan - Behind Enemy Lines (British Channel 4 TV episode, 01-02-2010)
- Camp Victory, Afghanistan (documentary film, 2010)
- Guardian Angels (Australian SBS Dateline TV episode, 26-09-2010)
- Hell and Back Again (documentary film, 2010)
- Restrepo (documentary film, 2010)
- Sisters in Arms (Canadian documentary film, 2010)
- Battle for Bomb Alley (TV special, 2011)
- Afghanistan (Finnish TV series, 8 episodes, 2011)
- Bomb Patrol Afghanistan (U.S. G4 TV series, 17 episodes, 2011–2012)
- Endgame Afghanistan (British ITV Tonight TV episode, 17-02-2011)
- Hooligans At War (documentary, 2011)
- Norway At War: Mission Afghanistan (TV series, 6 episodes 2011)
- War for Peace (Swedish TV series, 6 episodes, 2011)
- Our War: 10 Years in Afghanistan (BBC TV series, 6 episodes, 2011–2012)
- Afghanistan: The Great Game – A Personal View by Rory Stewart (2 episodes, 2012)
- Afghanistan: The Surge (PBS documentary film, 2012) https://www.youtube.com/watch?v=ZvZj3u1Eenw&t=5821s
- Lifesavers in Afghanistan (Norwegian TV series, 2 episodes, Livredderne i Afghanistan) 2012
- Royal Marines: Mission Afghanistan (British Channel 5 TV series, 6 episodes, 2012)
- Inside Combat Rescue (NGC TV series, 6 episodes, 2013)
- Mission Afghanistan (documentary film, 2013)
- Battleground Afghanistan (NGC TV series, 5 episodes, 2013)
- EyeWitness War (NGC TV series, 17 episodes, 2013)
- This Is What Winning Looks Like (documentary film, 2013)
- The Kill Team (documentary film, 2013)
- Commando: Return to the Front Line (documentary film, 2014)
- The Hornet's Nest (documentary film, 2014)
- Korengal (documentary film, 2014)
- Bitter Lake (documentary film, 2015)
- Apache Warrior (Netflix documentary film, 2017)
- Legion of Brothers (documentary film, 2017)
- Medal of Honor (Netflix TV series, 2018)
- Combat Obscura (documentary film, 2018)
- The Outpost (film, based on events at Combat Outpost Keating, 2019)
- Retrograde (documentary film, 2022)
