= The Violent Coast =

Holidays in the Danger Zone: Violent Coast is a four-part travel documentary on West Africa, part of the Holidays in the Danger Zone series, produced and broadcast by BBC This World. Written and presented by Ben Anderson, It was first broadcast on BBC Four, before being repeated on BBC Two between 21–24 June 2004, and internationally during 2004 and 2005.

- Episode 1: Liberia.
- Episode 2: Sierra Leone.
- Episode 3: Ivory Coast and Benin.
- Episode 4: Nigeria.

In the series, Anderson visits the West Africa coast, to see five former colonies that have come to symbolize all that is synonymous with the 'Violent Coast' Wars, Drugs, Dictators, Child Soldiers, Diamonds & Corruption. But with peace on the horizon things could be about to change for the better.

== See also ==
- America Was Here
- Holidays in the Axis of Evil
- Holidays in the Danger Zone
- Meet the Stans
- Places That Don't Exist
- Rivers
