= Rivers (Holidays in the Danger Zone) =

Five-part travel documentary on dangerous rivers

Ben Anderson with Indian soldiers in Northern India

Holidays in the Danger Zone: Rivers is a five-part travel documentary on dangerous rivers, part of the Holidays in the Danger Zone series, produced and broadcast by BBC This World. Written and presented by Ben Anderson, and produced by Will Daws. It was first broadcast between 21 February - 7 March 2006, on BBC Two.

- Episode 1: Amazon
- Episode 2: Ganges
- Episode 3: Euphrates
- Episode 4: The Jordan
- Episode 5: Congo

In the series, Anderson journeys down some of the world's most dangerous rivers, exploring life and the daily struggle to exist beside rivers that have been the course of so much political unrest. Starting with the Amazon, Anderson journey takes him into the Andes, where the effects of altitude sickness at the source of the Amazon take its toll on him. Then in India, Anderson visits the rapidly melting Satopanth Glacier that feeds the Ganges, its possibly impacted with Pakistan over control over water rights, before visiting the holy city of Varanasi where the massive amount of burials and cremations has caused the Ganges to become highly polluted; it is the fifth most polluted river of the world as of 2007, and a modern health hazard to everything that depends on the river for life. Anderson then goes to the Euphrates and the Jordan, both ancient rivers, steeped in history of a troubled region, before ending on the Congo which, like the nation it cuts through, has seen much violence in recent years.

== See also ==
- Holidays in the Danger Zone
- Holidays in the Axis of Evil
- America Was Here
- The Violent Coast
- Meet the Stans
- Places That Don't Exist
