= America Was Here =

Holidays in the Danger Zone: America Was Here is a four-part travel documentary on Central America and Southeast Asia, part of the Holidays in the Danger Zone series, produced and broadcast by BBC This World. Written and presented by Ben Anderson, and produced by Will Daws. It was first broadcast in June 2007, on BBC Four.

- Episode 1: Vietnam.
- Episode 2: Cambodia.
- Episode 3: Nicaragua and Honduras.
- Episode 4: El Salvador and Panama.

In the series, Anderson visits some countries that the United States of America has either invaded, interfered with or occupied during the Cold War.

== See also ==
- Holidays in the Danger Zone
- Holidays in the Axis of Evil
- The Violent Coast
- Rivers
- Meet the Stans
- Places That Don't Exist
