= Tropic of Cancer (TV series) =

2010 British television documentary

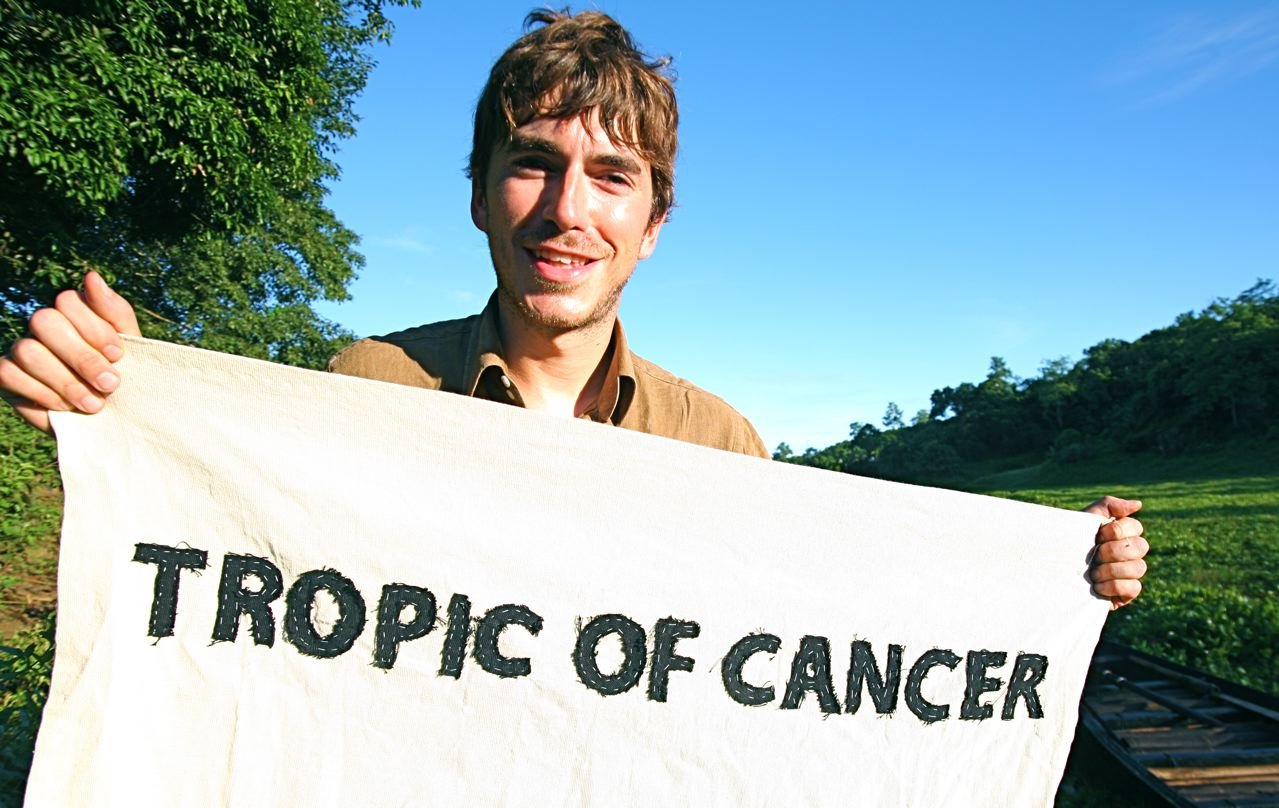
Author and TV presenter Simon Reeve on his journey around the Tropic of Cancer, the northern border of the tropics region.

Tropic of Cancer is a BBC television documentary presented by Simon Reeve. It was first broadcast on BBC Two in 2010. It follows his previous series Equator and Tropic of Capricorn.

== Countries visited ==
In order of visiting:

- Mexico
- Cuba
- The Bahamas
- Western Sahara
- Mauritania
- Algeria
- Libya
- Egypt
- Saudi Arabia
- United Arab Emirates
- Oman
- India
- Bangladesh
- Myanmar
- Laos
- Vietnam
- Taiwan
- USA (Hawaii)

== Journey ==
Simon Reeve began his journey round the tropics in Baja California, Mexico visiting the port of Cabo San Lucas and resort workers who lived in shacks. He moved on to the mainland by ferry, arriving in Culiacan where he met the local police. He then went up into Durango state's mountains to find old western sets before heading down to Mexico City to try his hand at Mexican wrestling. He then made a stop in Havana, Cuba before continuing to the Bahamas and Long Island where he'd find lionfish that were endangering the Caribbean Sea.

He then crosses the Atlantic to Western Sahara and the city of Dakhla where he tries windsurfing. He then heads to Nouadhibou, Mauritania crossing a field of land mines and then boarding the longest train in the world to Zouerat. He heads to Tindouf, Algeria over the sand dunes before flying to Tamanrasset and meeting old tour guides. The last country he visits is Libya and the town of Ghat where he heads out into the oases. He flies to Sabha where Muammar Gaddafi was born before continuing to Kufra where he sees a water project.

Episode 3 sees him travel through Southern Egypt and see the Egyptian ruins of Abu Simbel. He continues to Aswan and Lake Nasser before meeting a bedouin community before finishing in a Red Sea beach resort. He crosses to Saudi Arabia and Jeddah before heading to glitzy Riyadh and on by train to Dubai where he meets migrant workers. He finishes in Oman and the mountains around Nizwa before meeting turtles hatching in Sur.

Episode 4 sees him travel across India from Gujarat through Madhya Pradesh, Jharkhand and West Bengal visiting places such as the Rann of Kutch, Ujain and Kolkata.

Episode 5 sees him travel across Bangladesh by water to Dhaka and head on to the Indian border and cross over into Tripura. He discovers the rainforest being cut down before heading to Mizoram and on to Burma where he treks to a Chin village before having to turn back to India.

The final episode sees him visit Laos and the Golden Triangle as well as Luang Prabang and villagers who built their houses out of bomb shells from the Vietnam War before heading to Vietnam and discovering shocking animal cruelty in Hanoi and then visiting Ha Long Bay. In Taiwan he visits a Tropic of Cancer school and in Hawaii he sees volcanoes.
