= Holidays in the Axis of Evil =

U.S. (dark blue) president Bush's "axis of evil" includes Iran, Iraq, and North Korea (darker red). "Beyond the Axis of Evil" includes Cuba, Libya, and Syria (orange).

Holidays in the Danger Zone: Holidays in the Axis of Evil is a two part travel documentary on all of the countries in U.S. President George W. Bush's "Axis of evil", part of the Holidays in the Danger Zone series, produced and broadcast by BBC Correspondent (now This World). Written and presented by Ben Anderson, the series was first broadcast on 31 January 2003 from 2250 GMT on BBC Four.

- Episode 1: Iran, Syria & Libya
- Episode 2: Cuba, Iraq & North Korea

In the series, Anderson visits the 6 nations in U.S. President George W. Bush's "Axis of evil". They are all accused of harboring terrorists and attempting to build or acquire weapons of mass destruction. But there is another connection between the six countries - you can go on holiday there as according to Anderson "First it was Iraq, Iran and North Korea. Then George W expanded the axis of evil to include Cuba, Syria and Libya. All I could find that linked these countries was that you could travel to all six on a tourist visa. So I did".

== See also ==
- America Was Here
- Holidays in the Danger Zone
- Literature from the "Axis of Evil"
- Lullabies from the Axis of Evil
- Meet the Stans
- Places That Don't Exist
- Rivers
- The Violent Coast
