= Sisters in Arms =

Sisters in Arms may refer to:

- Sisters in Arms (1918 film), a British silent short film
- Sisters in Arms (1937 film), a French war drama film
- Sisters in Arms (2010 film), a Canadian documentary
- Sisters in Arms (2019 film), a French war drama
