= Meet the Stans =

Travel documentary

Holidays in the Danger Zone: Meet the Stans is a four-part travel documentary on Central Asia, part of the Holidays in the Danger Zone series, produced and broadcast by BBC Correspondent (now This World). Written and presented by Simon Reeve, it was first broadcast from 3–6 November 2003, on BBC Two, and internationally during 2004 and 2005.

- Episode 1: Kazakhstan
- Episode 2: Kyrgyzstan
- Episode 3: Uzbekistan
- Episode 4: Tajikistan

In the series Reeve visits four of the five former soviet Central Asia republics (not Turkmenistan). Travelling from the far north-west of Kazakhstan by the Russian border, goes east to the Chinese border, south through Kyrgyzstan and Tajikistan to the edge of Afghanistan, and west to Uzbekistan and the legendary Silk Road cities of Samarkand and Bukhara.

== See also ==
- Holidays in the Danger Zone
- Holidays in the Axis of Evil
- America Was Here
- The Violent Coast
- Rivers
- Places That Don't Exist
