= The Battle for Marjah =

The Battle for Marjah may refer to:

- The alternate name for Operation Moshtarak, an International Security Assistance Force (ISAF) pacification offensive in the town of Marjah, Helmand Province, Afghanistan.
- The Battle for Marjah (film), a 2011 HBO documentary written, about the actions of Bravo Company, 1st Battalion, 6th Marine Regiment during Operation Moshtarak.
