= Tropic of Cancer (disambiguation) =

The Tropic of Cancer is the most northerly circle of latitude of the Earth's tropics region.

Tropic of Cancer may also refer to:

- Tropic of Cancer (novel), 1934 novel by Henry Miller
- Tropic of Cancer (film), 1970 film based on the Henry Miller novel
- Tropic of Cancer (TV series), 2010 BBC TV series
- "Tropic of Cancer", a song from the Panda Bear album Panda Bear Meets the Grim Reaper

== See also ==
- Tropic of Capricorn (disambiguation)
