= Tropic of Capricorn (disambiguation) =

The Tropic of Capricorn is the more southerly circle of latitude of the Earth's tropics region.

Tropic of Capricorn may also refer to:

- Tropic of Capricorn (novel), Henry Miller novel
- Tropic of Capricorn (TV series), BBC TV series
- Tropic of Capricorn (album), a compilation album of orchestral music

== See also ==
- Tropic of Cancer (disambiguation)
