= Places That Don't Exist =

2005 British television series

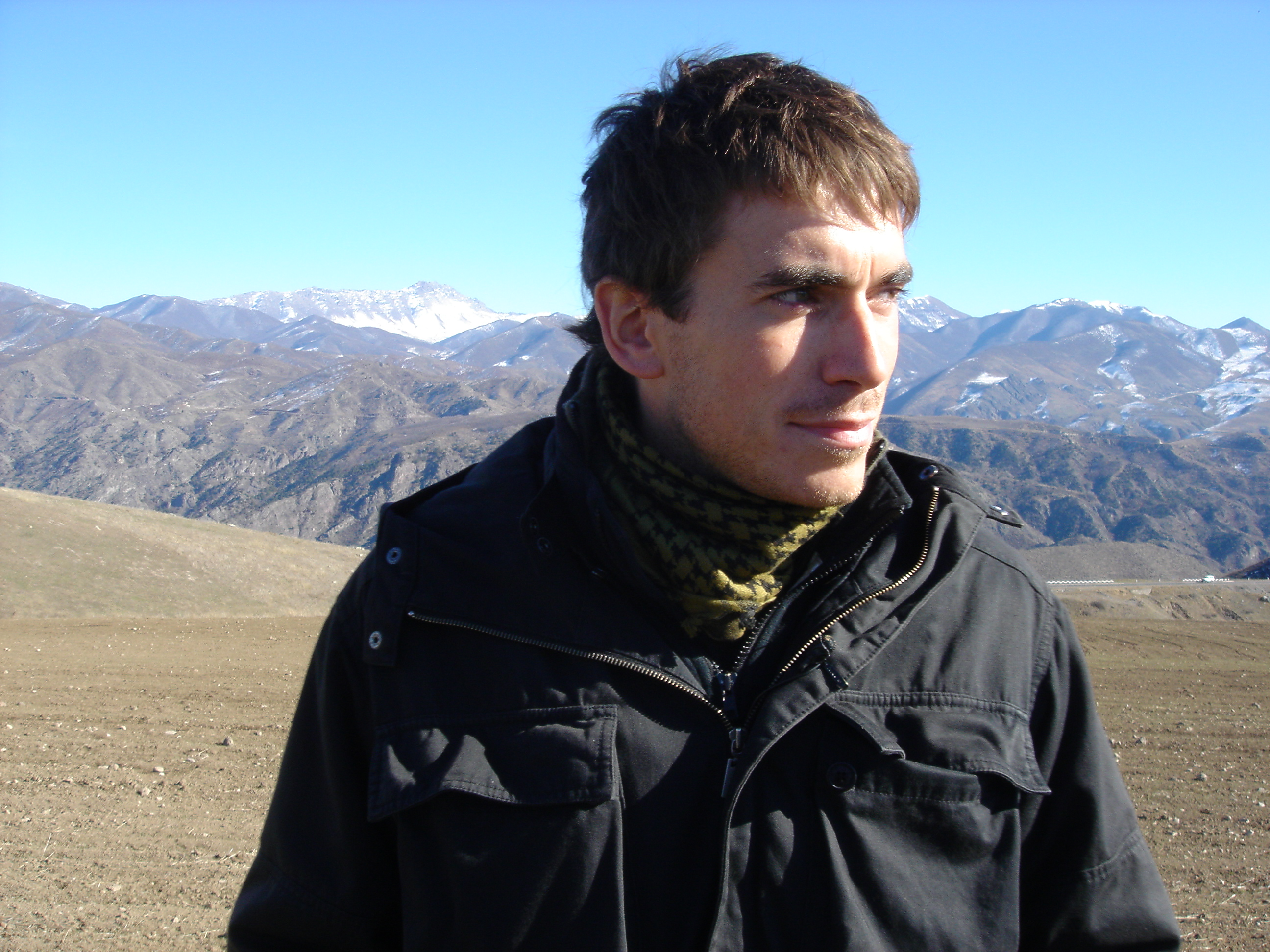
Nagorno-Karabakh: Simon Reeve in mountains on the border between Armenia and the unrecognised state of Nagorno-Karabakh - still the focus of ongoing tension and conflict between Armenia and Azerbaijan.

Holidays in the Danger Zone: Places That Don't Exist is a five-part travel documentary, part of the Holidays in the Danger Zone series, produced and broadcast by BBC This World. Written and presented by Simon Reeve, and produced by Will Daws and Iain Overton. It was first broadcast in May 2005, on BBC Two.

- Episode 1: Somaliland
- Episode 2: Trans-Dniester (Transnistria)
- Episode 3: Taiwan (Republic of China)
- Episode 4: South Ossetia and Abkhazia
- Episode 5: Nagorno-Karabakh

In the series, Reeve visits a number of small breakaway states and unrecognised nations including Somaliland, recognised as part of Somalia, Transnistria, recognised as part of Moldova where Reeve was detained for 'spying' by the Federal Security Service (FSB), Nagorno-Karabakh, part of Azerbaijan. Reeve also visited Adjara, Abkhazia, and South Ossetia, all recognised by the United Kingdom as parts of Georgia (despite a regional crisis in 2004, Adjara is now under the full control of Georgia), and the Republic of China also known as Taiwan.

The programme and its team were awarded a One World Broadcasting Trust Award in June 2005 for best popular feature.

== See also ==
- Holidays in the Danger Zone
- Holidays in the Axis of Evil
- America Was Here
- The Violent Coast
- Rivers
- Meet the Stans
