= Holidays in the Danger Zone =

Documentaries by BBC

Holidays in the Danger Zone is a series of documentaries, produced by the BBC This World and originally broadcast on BBC Four in the UK. They have also been shown on BBC Two and exported to other countries, including Canada and Australia.

The series of travelogues see the presenters Ben Anderson and Simon Reeve visit countries which are far off the beaten track.

- Holidays in the Axis of Evil was first to be broadcast. It was presented by Ben Anderson and included visits to North Korea, Iraq, Iran, Syria, Libya and Cuba; the countries named by former US president George W. Bush as members of an "Axis of Evil".
- America Was Here takes Anderson to countries where the US either intervened in conflicts or fought wars in recent history. They include Cambodia, El Salvador, Honduras, Nicaragua, Panama and Vietnam.
- The Violent Coast includes visits to one of the most dangerous parts of the world, on the western tip of Africa, as Anderson travels through Côte d'Ivoire, Benin, Nigeria, Liberia and Sierra Leone.
- Rivers takes a slightly different approach. Instead of featuring specific countries, Anderson travels along five of the world's most dangerous rivers (the Amazon River, Ganges, Congo River, Euphrates and Jordan River) which pass through many disputed territories.
- Meet the Stans was presented by Simon Reeve for the first time, and saw him travel through Central Asia. Along the way, he visited Kazakhstan, Kyrgyzstan, Tajikistan and Uzbekistan.
- Places That Don't Exist, presented by Reeve, visited countries which aren't officially recognised breakaway states from other nations. The trip took him to Taiwan, Nagorno-Karabakh, South Ossetia, Somaliland and Transnistria.

The programmes are occasionally repeated on BBC Four and have also been shown on BBC World. Outside the UK, the series currently screens on the BBC Knowledge and BBC Earth channels.
