= The New Jackals =

Book by Simon Reeve

The New Jackals: Ramzi Yousef, Osama bin Laden and the future of terrorism
- Author: Simon Reeve
- Language: English
- Subject: Islamic terrorism
- Publisher: Andre Deutsch
- Publication date: 1998
- Publication place: United Kingdom
- Media type: Print
- Pages: 304
- ISBN: 1-55553-509-7

The New Jackals: Ramzi Yousef, Osama bin Laden and the future of terrorism is a 1998 book by Simon Reeve.

== Background ==
Published in 1998, this was the first book on Osama bin Laden, Ramzi Yousef and Al-Qaeda. Classified documents obtained by the author detailed the existence, development and aims of al-Qaeda.

== Summary ==
Reeve's thesis is that a group of several thousand men who fought against the Soviets during the Afghan War of the 1980s would later dominate international terrorism. He warned that many of these men, known as the "Afghan Arabs", had become the core of Al-Qaeda and constituted a new breed of terrorist, militants with no restrictions on mass killing. Reeve concluded that, by 1998, the world was entering a new age of apocalyptic terrorism, and predicted that Al-Qaeda would launch massive attacks on Western targets.

Following the September 11, 2001 attacks in the United States, the book was republished with a new epilogue, which warned that the West remains vulnerable to further attacks, possibly from biological and nuclear weapons of mass destruction.

== Publication ==
Published 1998 by Andre Deutsch (later Carlton) in the United Kingdom and NUP in the U.S., ISBN 1-55553-509-7.
