= Equator (TV series) =

British television series

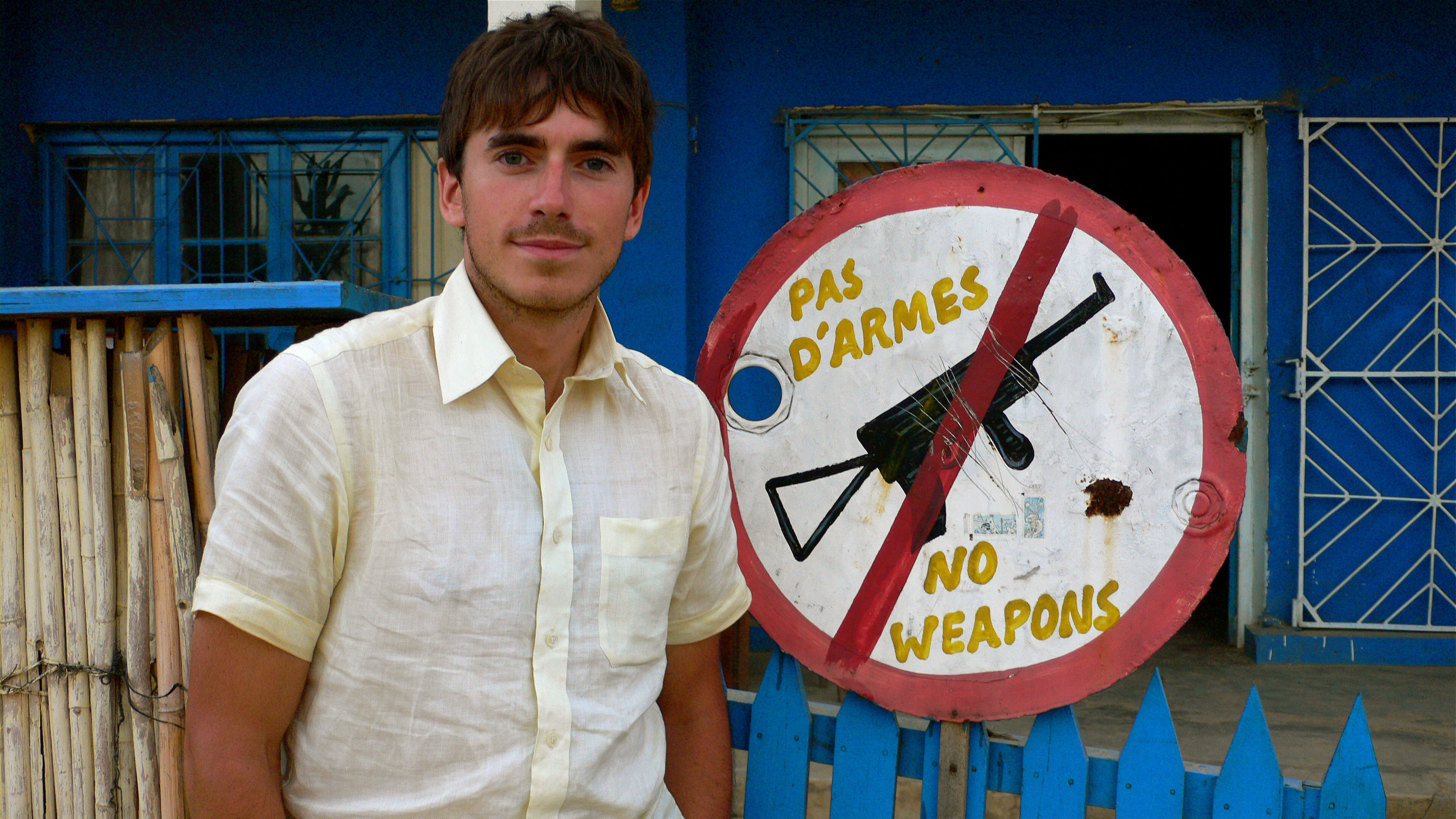
Simon Reeve in the eastern Democratic Republic of the Congo, outside a bar which bans weapons. At least four million Congolese have died since 1998 in the deadliest conflict since the Second World War. The Congolese continue to suffer in this vast, forgotten and underdeveloped country.

Equator is a 2006 BBC television documentary series in three parts charting presenter Simon Reeve's journey along the Equator through Africa, Asia and South America. He traveled through Gabon, Democratic Republic of the Congo, Uganda, Kenya, Indonesia, Ecuador, Colombia and Brazil. Republic of the Congo was skipped due to threats against foreigners at the time, and Somalia was skipped due to ongoing conflict in the area.
