= This Is What Winning Looks Like =

Documentary film about the War in Afghanistan

- Directed by: Ben Anderson
- Production company: Vice Media
- Release date: May 27, 2013
- Running time: 1 hour 29 minutes
- Country: United States
- Language: English

This Is What Winning Looks Like is a 2013 documentary by Ben Anderson. It covers the troubled efforts by the International Security Assistance Force (ISAF) during the 2001–2021 War in Afghanistan to train the Afghan National Security Forces (ANSF) and assist in rebuilding key government institutions. The title of the film is a 2013 quote from US General John R. Allen.

The film received the 2013 Frontline Club Award for Broadcast.

== Background ==
After the September 11 attacks in 2001, the United States launched an invasion of Afghanistan that toppled the Taliban-ruled Islamic Emirate of Afghanistan. The United Nations then passed United Nations Security Council Resolution 1386, which outlined the creation of a permanent Afghan government and the creation of the International Security Assistance Force (ISAF). ISAF's primary goal was to train the Afghan National Security Forces (ANSF) and rebuild key infrastructure. NATO took command of the mission in 2003, and a total of 42 countries contributed troops to ISAF, including all members of NATO. By 2010, the US accounted for the majority of ISAF troops.

In 2007, Anderson had previously documented the "undermanned [and] underequipped" British Armed Forces fighting the Taliban in Helmand, Afghanistan.

The title of the film is a quote from US General John R. Allen, on his last day as head of NATO forces in Afghanistan.

== Synopsis ==
The documentary begins in December 2012. Anderson follows the US effort to train the Afghan National Army and Afghan National Police to take over after it left Afghanistan. The film uncovers a less-than-seamless transition, revealing rampant sexual abuse and killing of young boys by Afghan police commanders and other adult men as part of a cultural practice called bacha bazi, addiction to drugs such as opiates and marijuana, corruption, insider attacks and double agents inside the Afghan security forces, and false imprisonment of prisoners by Afghan officials. Afghan officers are less than willing to rectify the issues and prosecute those responsible.

During filming, there was an attempt on the life of an effective Afghan commander by a soldier under his command, and four boys were shot while trying to escape abuse at the hands of police commanders, three of which were fatal. To date, none of the commanders responsible for the abuse have been arrested or investigated.

American and British officials receive and broadcast the message that they are succeeding in Afghanistan, despite the beliefs of soldiers on the ground, such as United States Marine Major Bill Steuber, the commanding officer of the police advisory team. Steuber described the rampant corruption, giving examples of skimming ammunition off supplies and fuel off shipments, and claiming unusable vehicles for oil and fuel money. He explains the pressure of working with people who regularly rob and murder civilians, and molest children, stating that it "wears on you after a while".

Anderson summarizes, "All it is now is about getting out and saving face. We're not leaving because we achieved our goals. We're leaving because we've given up on achieving those goals."

== Bacha bazi ==
Although illegal in Afghanistan, bacha bazi continues unchallenged pederasty practice in Afghanistan; to its widespread nature and influential participants, such as senior officials. Using a selective translation of Islamic law and a liberal interpretation of what constitutes homosexuality, the practice reveals the perception of relationships with prepubescent boys and the value of women in society. The boys are coveted as signs of wealth and status, not unlike horse racing or dog fighting. According to one practitioner, "Having a boy has become a custom for us. Whoever wants to show off, should have a boy".

== Reception ==
A guest columnist in Foreign Policy wrote that the film "shows what most coalition forces in Helmand, and Afghanistan more broadly, experience". He received the 2013 Frontline Club Award for Broadcast for the film.

== Aftermath ==
During an interview in November 2020, Anderson reported that Steuber's continuous reporting of abuse to senior personnel, including of bachi bazi practice, resulted in his military career being cut short.

== See also ==
- War in Afghanistan (2001–2021)
