= Labour force of the United Arab Emirates =

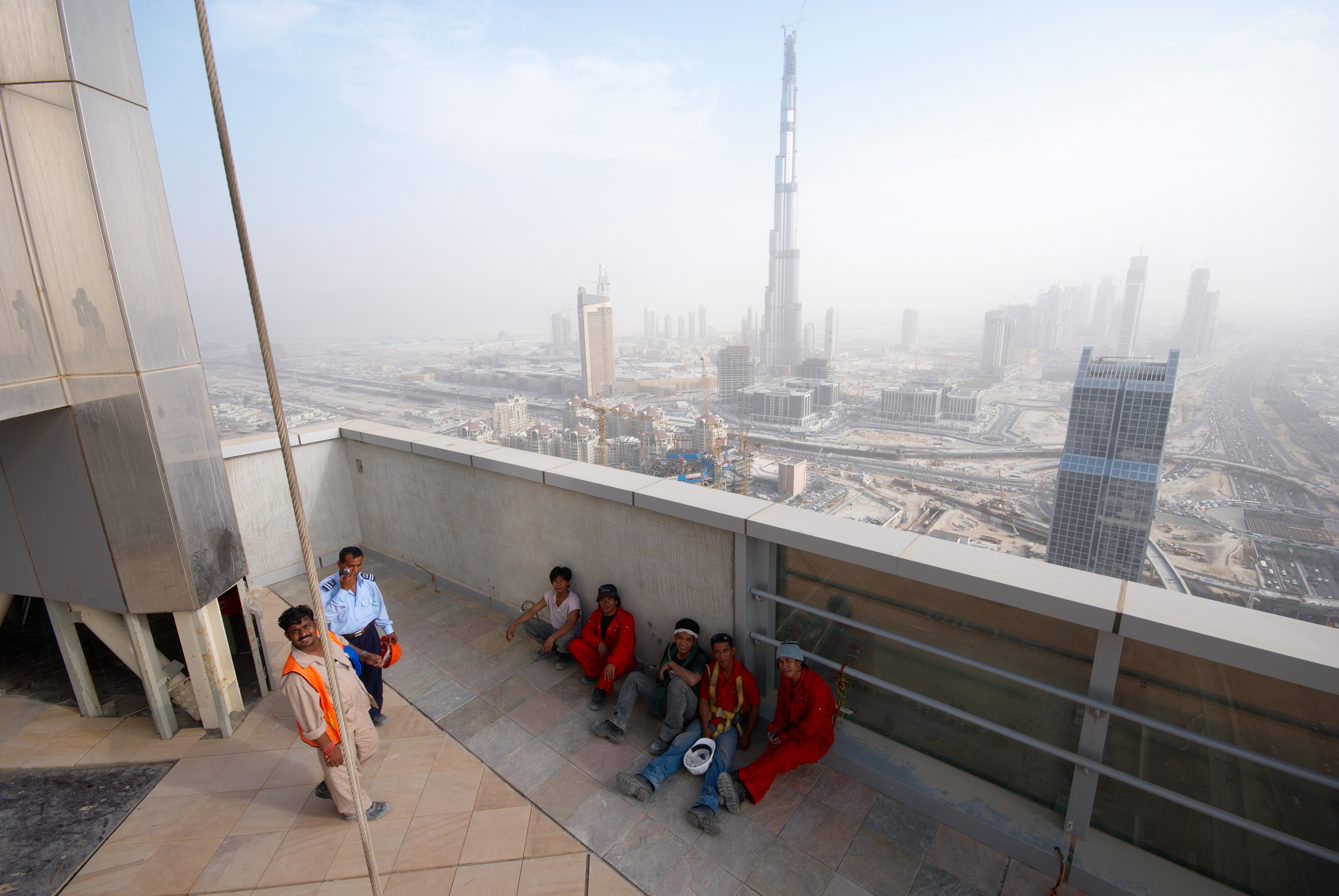
Construction workers from Asia on top floor of the Angsana Tower

The labour force of the United Arab Emirates is primarily made up of foreign temporary workers, most of whom come from the Indian subcontinent and other parts of the Arab World and Asia. There is a sizeable number of Westerners, the majority of them being British and Americans.

== Equal opportunities ==
There are very few anti-discrimination laws in relation to labour issues, with Emiratis being given preferential treatment when it comes to employment, even though they generally do not show an interest in working. Emiratis and nationals from developed countries are also given higher salaries compared to workers from other parts of the world. Expatriates who have lived in the countries for long periods of time are generally not given full UAE citizenship and are treated like those who have just arrived recently.

== Human rights violations ==
NPR reported that workers "typically live eight to a room, sending home a portion of their salary to their families, whom they usually don't see for years at a time." The BBC has reported that "local newspapers often carry stories of construction workers allegedly not being paid for months on end. They are not allowed to move jobs and if they leave the country to go home they will almost certainly lose the money they say they are owed." Additionally, most of the workers are forced to give up their passports upon entering Dubai, making it very difficult to return home. In September 2005, the Minister of Labour ordered one company to pay unpaid salaries within 24 hours after workers protested, and published the name of the offending company.

In December 2005, the Indian consulate in Dubai submitted a report to the Government of India detailing labor problems faced by Indian expatriates in the emirate. The report highlighted delayed payment of wages, substitution of employment contracts, premature termination of services and excessive working hours as being some of the challenges faced by Indian workers in the city. On 21 March 2006, workers at the construction site of Burj Khalifa, upset over bus timings and working conditions, rioted: damaging cars, offices, computers, and construction tools.

The city's discriminatory legal system and unequal treatment of foreigners has been brought to light by its alleged attempts to cover up information on the rape of Alexandre Robert, a 15-year-old French-Swiss national, by three locals, one of whose HIV-positive status was hidden by the authorities for several months and by the recent mass imprisonment of migrant laborers, most of whom were from India, on account of their protests against poor wages and living conditions.

The alleged labour injustices in Dubai have attracted the attention of various Human Rights groups, which have tried to persuade the government to become a signatory to two of the International Labour Organization's 7 core conventions, which allows for the formation of labour unions. The Dubai government has denied any kind of labour injustices and has stated that the watchdog's (Human Rights Watch) accusations were misguided. Towards the end of March 2006, the government announced steps to allow construction unions. UAE labour minister Ali al-Kaabi said: "Labourers will be allowed to form unions."

Prostitution, though illegal by law, is conspicuously present in the emirate because of an economy that is largely based on tourism and trade. Research conducted by the American Center for International Policy Studies (AMCIPS) found that women from the former USSR and Ethiopian women are the most common prostitutes, as well as women from some African countries, while Indian prostitutes are part of a well-organized trans-Oceanic prostitution network. A 2007 PBS documentary entitled Dubai: Night Secrets reported that prostitution in clubs is tolerated by authorities and many foreign women work there without being coerced, attracted by the money.

== See also ==
- Kafala system
