= The Battle for Marjah (film) =

- Genre: Documentary
- Written by: Ben Anderson
- Directed by: Anthony Wonke
- Country of origin: United States
- Original language: English

Production
- Running time: 88 minutes
- Production company: HBO Documentary Films

Original release
- Release: October 7, 2010

The Battle for Marjah is an HBO documentary written, filmed and produced by Ben Anderson, covering the efforts of Bravo Company, 1st Battalion, 6th Marine Regiment of the US military in Operation Moshtarak.
