= Tropic of Capricorn (TV series) =

British television series

- Presented by: Simon Reeve
- No. of seasons: 1
- No. of episodes: 4

Production
- Production location: Tropic of Capricorn

Original release
- Network: BBC Two
- Release: 10 February 2008

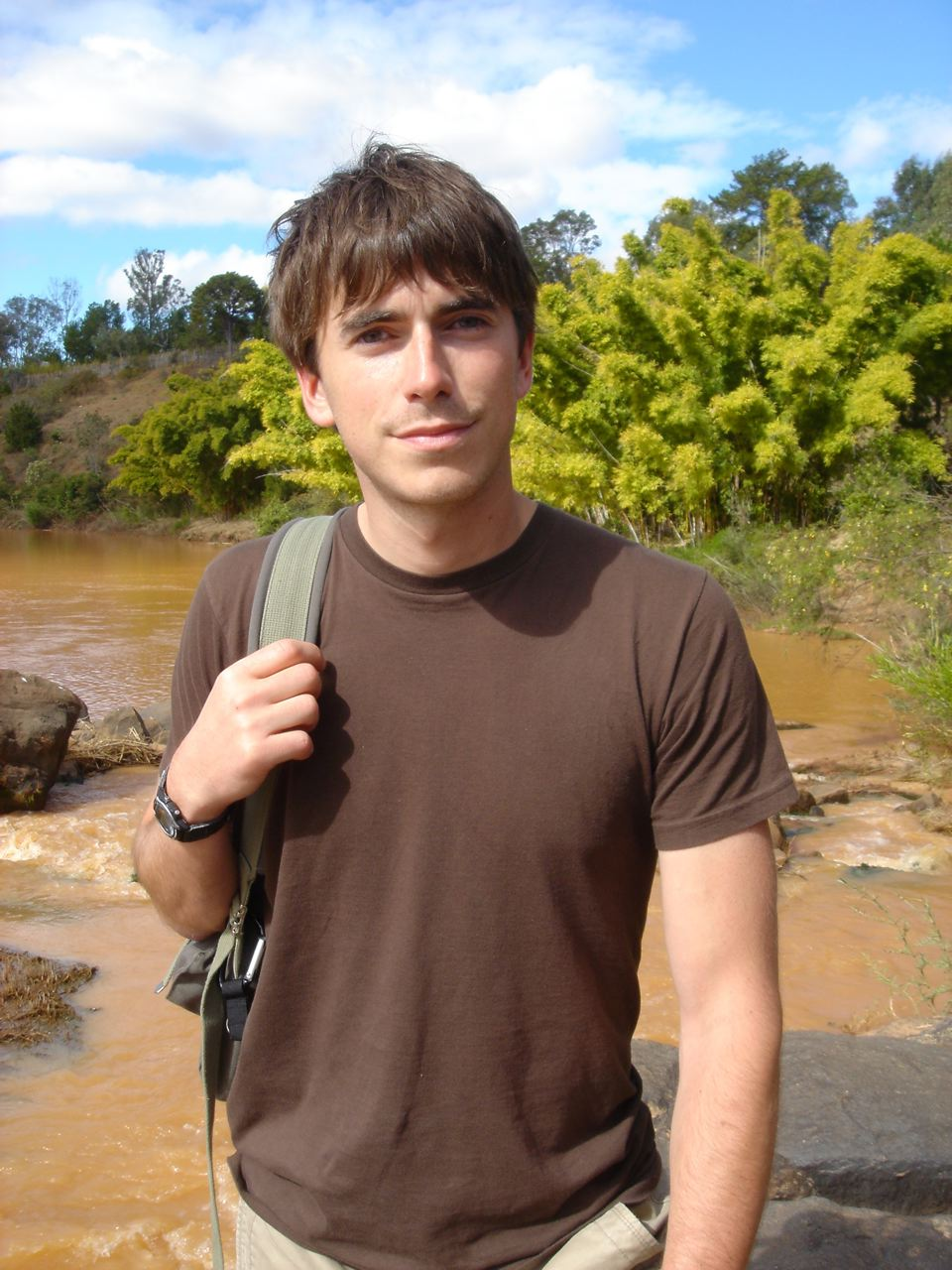
Tropic of Capricorn presenter Simon Reeve in Madagascar.

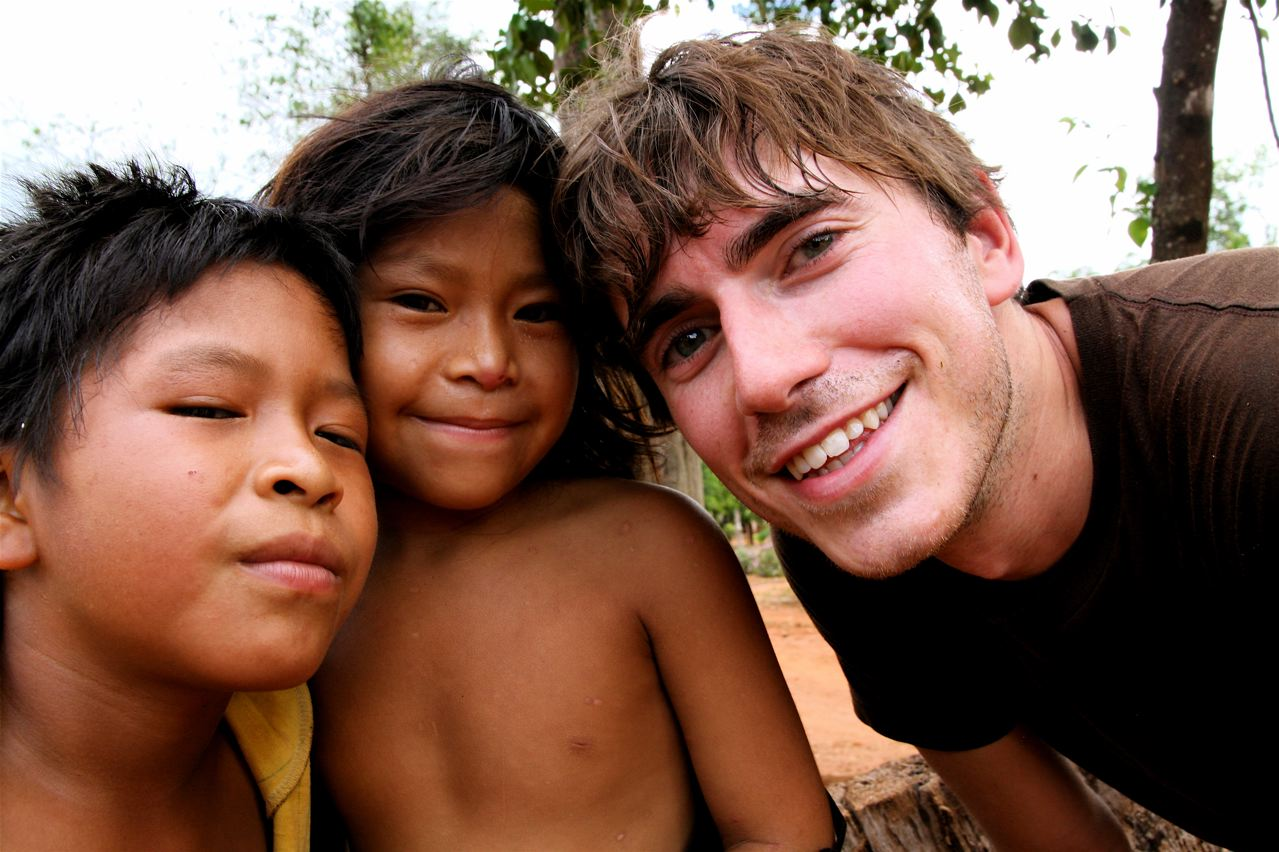
Reeve with young Aché children in the Mbaracayú forest in Paraguay.

Tropic of Capricorn is a BBC television documentary series. It was aired on BBC Two in 2008 and showed presenter Simon Reeve travelling along the Tropic of Capricorn.

== Countries visited ==
In order of visiting:

- Namibia
- Botswana
- South Africa
- Mozambique
- Madagascar
- Australia
- Chile
- Argentina
- Paraguay
- Brazil

== Journey ==
In Episode 1 Simon crossed Namibia and Botswana visiting Swakopmund and the Namib-Naukluft National Park before heading to Windhoek, the bustling capital city of Namibia known for its mix of German architecture and its sprawling informal settlements. In Botswana he met the San People who had been forced to abandon much of their way of life in order to work on a diamond mine.

In Episode 2 Simon crossed the Limpopo region of South Africa visiting Louis Trichardt, being surprised at how black the town was. He meets an Afrikaans family to discuss danger issues before moving to Musina where he witnesses Zimbabweans fleeing from Bulawayo for Johannesburg. He visits a couple of wildlife sanctuaries in the Kruger National Park and then heads into the Limpopo National Park in Mozambique to meet villagers facing eviction. He heads to the coast on the N1 and discovers how unindustrialized Mozambique is before heading to the Bazaruto Archipelago and meeting villagers who have been betrayed by 5* hotels. In Madagascar he explores Antananarivo- a mix of Paris and hell. He flies to Toliara and sees the spikey forest and then visits the sapphire mines of Ilakaka, the town of Fianarantsoa and finishes on the Fianarantsoa-Côte Est railway and finishes in Manakara discovering how important the train is to the environment and local trade.
