= Simon Reeve (British TV presenter) =

English author and television presenter (born 1972)

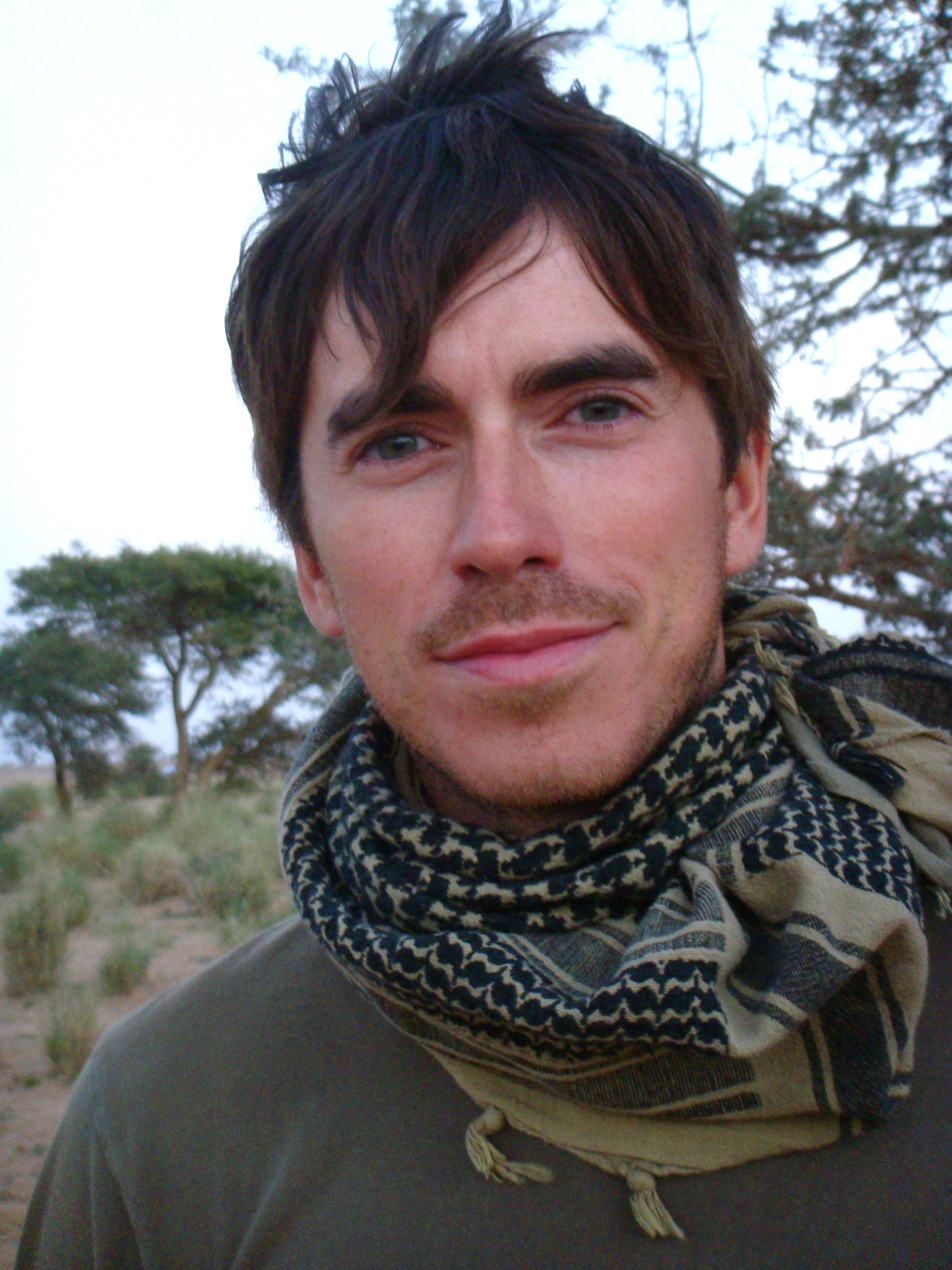
- Reeve in Mauritania, in 2009
- Born: Simon Alan Reeve; 21 July 1972 (age 54); Hammersmith, London, England
- Occupations: Author, documentary filmmaker, television presenter
- Known for: Terrorism and political travel documentary filmmaker
- Television: see below
- Spouse: Anya Reeve (née Courts)
- Children: 1
- Awards: see below
- Website: www.simonreeve.co.uk

Simon Alan Reeve (born 21 July 1972) is a British author, journalist, adventurer, documentary filmmaker and television presenter.

Reeve has made global travel and environmental documentaries, and has written books on international terrorism, modern history, and his adventures. Amongst his many television programmes and series for the BBC, Reeve has presented Holidays in the Danger Zone: Places That Don't Exist, Tropic of Cancer with Simon Reeve, Equator and Tropic of Capricorn.

He is the author of The New Jackals (1998), One Day in September (2005) and Tropic of Capricorn (2007). He has received a One World Broadcasting Trust Award and the 2012 Ness Award from the Royal Geographical Society (RGS).

== Early life ==
Reeve was born on 21 July 1972, in Hammersmith, London and was brought up in Acton, West London, by his parents, Alan Reeve, who was a teacher, and Cindy Reeve, who was an occupational therapist and worked in restaurants. He has a younger brother called James. He attended the Twyford Church of England High School in Acton.

Reeve had a "tense and sometimes violent relationship" with his father when he was growing up. He said that in his house "there was endless shouting, lots of crashing and banging, and a few times it was so violent we or our neighbours called the police to come and break us up".

Reeve carried a knife by the age of 12 or 13. From the age of 14, he required counselling due to behavioural problems, such as starting fires, vandalism, and setting off an explosive at the Ealing Broadway Centre.

He described his final months at school being "a bit of a blur". He left school with one GCSE, living on Income Support, and with mental health problems. At the age of 17, Reeve stated he was even a "whisker away" from suicide. He found himself standing on the edge of a bridge, unable to "face existence", but something made him climb back.

== Career ==
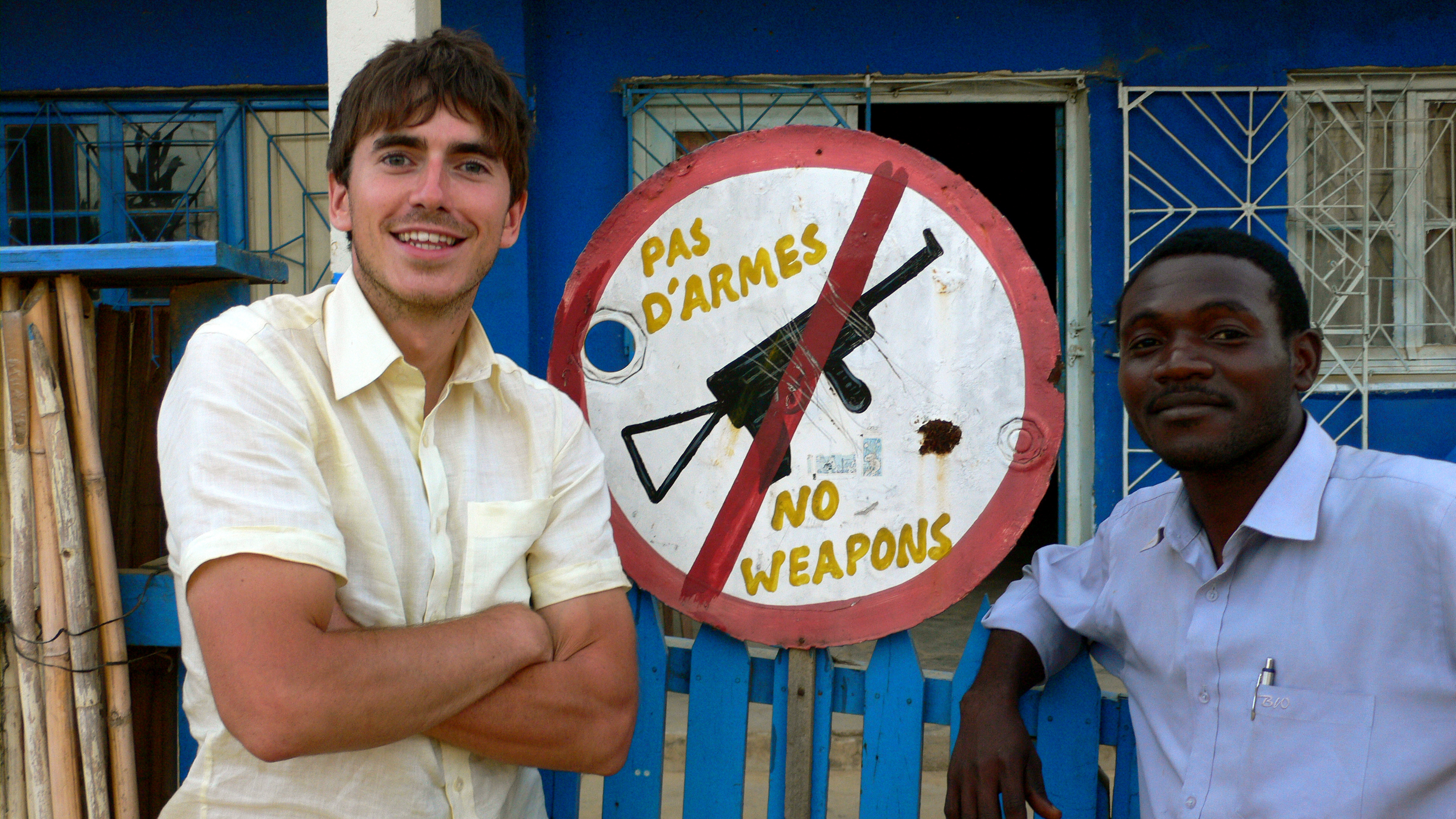
Simon Reeve in Equator

After leaving school, he took a series of jobs, including working in a supermarket, a jewellery shop and a charity shop. At the age of 18, he began work at the British newspaper The Sunday Times, initially as a post boy and then in the cuttings library, where he assisted a team of investigative journalists. During this time he spent nights working on investigations into nuclear smuggling, arms dealing and terrorism. One of his formative roles at 18 was to follow a weapons dealer from Gatwick Airport.

At the age of 21, citing his "fearlessness of youth", Reeve was investigating the 1993 World Trade Center bombing. He wrote a book The New Jackals: Ramzi Yousef, Osama bin Laden and the Future of Terrorism; eventually published in 1998, it was the first book on Osama bin Laden, Ramzi Yousef, and al-Qaeda and became a New York Times bestseller. Classified documents obtained by the author, with uninhibited access from the likes of the FBI and the CIA, detailed the existence, development, and aims of al-Qaeda, yet his book's warning of an apocalyptic act by terrorists went unnoticed.

After the attacks of 11 September 2001 in the United States, Reeve became a media expert on terrorism on the basis of his book. The BBC initially wanted him to make a programme involving infiltrating al-Qaeda. He eventually began making travel documentaries. Tom Hall, travel editor for Lonely Planet publications, has described Reeve's travel documentaries as "the best travel television programmes of the past five years".

In January 2013, Reeve appeared in a charity special of The Great British Bake Off.

6 September 2018 saw the release of Reeve's autobiography, Step by Step: The Life in My Journeys, covering his humble beginnings to successful author and television presenter.

After catching malaria on a journey around the Equator, Reeve became an ambassador for the Malaria Awareness Campaign.

Along with Sir David Attenborough and other conservation specialists, Reeve is a member of the Council of Ambassadors for the World Wide Fund for Nature (WWF), one of the world's leading environmental organisations.

In 2020, Reeve was commissioned by the BBC to present his first UK-based travel show Cornwall With Simon Reeve. This was followed by Incredible Journeys With Simon Reeve on BBC Two. The latter show is due to be a 'look back' programme similar to Joanna Lumley's Unseen Adventures or Michael Palin: Travels of a Lifetime (a show which featured both Reeve and Lumley talking about the ex-Monty Python actor's travels).

Reeve has made global travel and environmental documentaries, and has written books on international terrorism, modern history, and his adventures.

== Personal life ==
Reeve is married to Anya Reeve (née Courts), a television camera operator and campaigner who has stood as a Green Party candidate. The couple have a son.

Reeve divides his home time between London and his house in Devon, near the Dartmoor National Park.

In January 2022, Reeve was the castaway for BBC Radio 4's Desert Island Discs. His musical choices included Puccini's "Vissi d'arte" by Kiri Te Kanawa, "Mr. Brightside" by The Killers and "Rocket Man" by Elton John.

== Television ==
- 2003 – Holidays in the Danger Zone: Meet the Stans
- 2004 – House of Saud (also broadcast as: Saudi: The Family in Crisis)
- 2005 – Holidays in the Danger Zone: Places That Don't Exist
- 2006 – Equator (Silver Award winner, 2007 Wanderlust Travel Awards)
- 2008 – Tropic of Capricorn
- 2009 – Explore
- 2010 – Tropic of Cancer with Simon Reeve
- 2012 – Indian Ocean with Simon Reeve
- 2012 – Cuba with Simon Reeve
- 2013 – Australia with Simon Reeve
- 2013 – Pilgrimage with Simon Reeve
- 2014 – Tea Trail/Coffee Trail with Simon Reeve
- 2014 – Sacred Rivers with Simon Reeve
- 2015 – Caribbean with Simon Reeve
- 2015 – Ireland with Simon Reeve
- 2016 – Greece with Simon Reeve
- 2017 – Turkey with Simon Reeve
- 2017 – Colombia with Simon Reeve
- 2017 – Russia with Simon Reeve
- 2018 – Burma with Simon Reeve
- 2018 – Mediterranean with Simon Reeve
- 2019 – North Americas with Simon Reeve
- 2020 – Cornwall with Simon Reeve
- 2021 – Incredible Journeys with Simon Reeve
- 2021 – The Lakes with Simon Reeve
- 2022 – Simon Reeve's South America
- 2023 – Simon Reeve's Return to Cornwall
- 2024 – Wilderness with Simon Reeve
- 2025 – Scandinavia with Simon Reeve
- 2026 – Wilderness with Simon Reeve (Series two)

== Bibliography ==
- The New Jackals: Ramzi Yousef, Osama bin Laden and the Future of Terrorism. UK: Andre Deutsch, USA: Northeastern University Press. 7 October 1999. ISBN 978-1555534073.
- One Day in September. Faber & Faber. 1 December 2005. ISBN 978-0571231812.
- Tropic of Capricorn. BBC Books. 6 February 2008. ISBN 978-1-84607-440-0.
- Step by Step: The Life in My Journeys. Hodder & Stoughton. 6 September 2018. ISBN 978-1473689107.
- Journeys to Impossible Places. Hodder & Stoughton. 14 October 2021. ISBN 978-1529364019.

== Awards and accolades ==
- 2005 – One World Broadcasting Trust (OWBT) Popular Features Award (with Will Daws)
- 2007 – Wanderlust Travel Awards Silver Award
- 2012 – Royal Geographical Society (RGS) Ness Award
