= Ben Anderson (journalist) =

British journalist (born 1974)

- Born: Benjamin John Anderson; 1974 (age 51–52); Cleveland, Yorkshire, United Kingdom
- Occupations: Journalist, war correspondent, television reporter, writer
- Notable work: The Battle for Marjah; This Is What Winning Looks Like; Mission Accomplished? The Secret of Helmand
- Awards: Emmy Award

Ben Anderson (born 1974) is a British journalist, war correspondent, television reporter, and writer. He is particularly known for his coverage of the 2001–2021 War in Afghanistan, including the films This Is What Winning Looks Like, The Battle for Marjah, and Mission Accomplished? The Secret of Helmand. He has reported on numerous other controversial locations, including North Korea, Iran, and Guantanamo Bay. He has received awards for his work, including an Emmy in 2016 and the Foreign Press Award.

== Early life ==
Benjamin John Anderson was born in Cleveland, Yorkshire, United Kingdom in 1974. He grew up in Bedford, and was educated at Bedford Modern School. His father worked in various working-class jobs, including as a painter and policeman, and encouraged Anderson to learn a trade.

According to Anderson, he became interested in world events at around age 16 or 17. He read an article about the British government supporting the Indonesian invasion of East Timor and was outraged, but dismayed to find others around him were unaware of the event. He then realized he could do "useful" work as a journalist.

According to his r/IAmA on Reddit, Anderson did not study journalism in college. He was the first member of his family to attend university, but quit after a year.

== Career ==
Around age 21, Anderson wrote and submitted articles about the invasion of East Timor, but received rejections and did not travel there. He had wanted to be a writer, but became interested in documentary or TV news after watching World in Action by John Pilger.

According to Anderson, his first film ever was in 1997 for Channel 4, in which he filmed undercover as an employee of a Service Corporation International funeral home. He did three or four months of unpaid overtime, undercover. In the film, he exposed employees treating dead bodies with disrespect, including "throwing around" the corpses of babies and using occupied coffins "as rubbish bins". Service Corporation sued to prevent the release of the film, but lost.

The film received positive attention and won awards, leading to the BBC offering him a job.

=== BBC ===
For three or four years of Anderson's early career, he mostly worked as an undercover journalist. For one film, he filmed undercover to investigate elder abuse. At one point, he worked concurrently undercover as a pig farmer during the day and as a bouncer at night.

Although he initially did not appear on camera much, he eventually caught the attention of a BBC Two executive. The executive asked Anderson to create a series for the channel. In 2003, Anderson became inspired by US President George W. Bush's infamous "Axis of evil" speech, and decided to create a series based on the six countries of the Axis: Iran, Iraq, North Korea, Syria, Libya and Cuba. This became the first series of Holidays in the Danger Zone, which Anderson hosted until 2006. In the show, he followed the Liberians United for Reconciliation and Democracy rebels in the Second Liberian Civil War.

For BBC 1's Panorama, Anderson covered modern slavery in Dubai. He returned to Helmand several times, for Newsnight, The Times, The Guardian magazine, GQ and VBS. Spike Jonze singled out Anderson's film Obama's War as amongst the best of 2009.

He also made films about gang wars in El Salvador, the landless movement in Brazil, pollution in Varanasi, gorilla poaching in Congo, homosexuals in America, Maoist insurgents in Bihar, water rights for Palestinians in the West Bank, the third generation of Agent Orange victims in Vietnam, deportees and pimps in Cambodia, and the war in Southern Iraq. Ben also presented World's Toughest Tribes: a six-part television documentary series for Discovery Channel that focused on unique modern-day tribes.

In 2007, he began covering the war in southern Afghanistan. In 2007, he made Taking on the Taliban, a film based on two months he spent in Helmand, Afghanistan's most violent province, with the British Grenadier Guards.

He wrote a book about his experiences in Afghanistan called ''No Worse Enemy: The Inside Story of the Chaotic Struggle for Afghanistan" (ISBN 185168977X). The book received praise from Sherard Cowper-Coles, former British Ambassador to Afghanistan.

In 2010 he wrote, filmed and produced The Battle for Marjah for HBO/Channel Four and in 2011 he made The Battle for Bomb Alley for BBC1, which followed US Marines as they struggled to reclaim the district of Sangin in Afghanistan. He created Mission Accomplished? The Secret of Helmand for BBC.

=== Vice Media ===
Anderson came into contact with Vice via a friend who ran the London branch of the Vice magazine. In the late 2000s, Vice began producing more video content, and one of its cofounders, Shane Smith, invited Anderson to contribute his work. Anderson then negotiated his future contracts with the BBC to allow his work to be recut and shown on Vice.

In 2010, he filmed World Boxing Association heavyweight champion David Haye's visit to Senegal for Vice. Anderson and Haye had been friends since Haye was 16 years old.

In 2013, Anderson joined Vice full time as an on-air correspondent and producer. He moved to the United States around this time. His first film as a Vice employee was This Is What Winning Looks Like, which covered the troubled efforts to prepare Afghanistan for the withdrawal of foreign troops and administration.

In 2015, he filmed undercover in Dubai, documenting the mistreatment of foreign workers.

He was a correspondent and senior producer of the HBO & Showtime series Vice.

== Personal life ==
As of 2019, Anderson lived in Brooklyn, New York. He had no children as of 2019. He has been interested in boxing since childhood.

For much of his career, Anderson travelled alone, although he travelled with a cameraperson for some films. He said traveling alone helped him move faster and reduced concerns about accounting for others' safety.

In 2015, he said his biggest fear as a war correspondent was having his mother see him in a traumatizing video. He also feared being maimed or killed by improvised explosive devices. He has denied doing the work for the thrill, and said he found the work more like "an endurance test". In 2015, he described the Islamic State as being the most violent group he had seen in his career.

He has PTSD from his experiences. He described feeling numb to both enjoyable and traumatic experiences. For example, he said he felt "bored" during the 2016–2017 Battle of Mosul, in which he was in close proximity to active combat and suicide bombers.

He underwent MDMA-assisted psychotherapy and Ketamine-assisted psychotherapy to treat it. He reported feeling somewhat better in 2019. In 2020, it was reported that the treatments were unsuccessful.

== Awards ==
He received the Foreign Press Award. In 2013, he received the award for Prix Bayeux for Grand Format television for his BBC documentary Mission Accomplished? Secrets of Helmand. That year he also received the Frontline Club Award for Broadcast for This is What Winning Looks Like. In 2016, his piece Fighting Isis won the 2016 Emmy for Outstanding Sound Mixing for a Nonfiction Program.

He was nominated each year between 2015 and 2018 for the Outstanding Informational Series or Special award in the Emmys for his work at Vice. Taking on the Taliban was shortlisted for RTS programme and Journalism awards, as well as a BAFTA.

== Filmography ==
| Year(s) | Name |
|---|---|
| 2003–2006 | Holidays in the Danger Zone |
| 2005 | Frontline Football |
| 2006 | World's Toughest Tribes |
| 2007 | Taking on the Taliban (Panorama) |
| 2009 | Obama's War (FRONTLINE) |
| 2009 | Slaves of Dubai |
| 2010 | Young, British, and Angry |
| 2010 | VICE Meets David Haye |
| 2011 | The Battle for Marjah |
| 2011 | The Battle for Bomb Alley (Panorama) |
| 2013 | Mission Accomplished? The Secret of Helmand (Panorama) |
| 2013 | This Is What Winning Looks Like |
| 2014 | The Interpreters |
| 2015 | Lines in the Sand & Outsourcing Embryos |
| 2015 | Afghanistan After Us |
| 2016 | Return to Yemen & Church and States |
| 2016 | Fighting ISIS |
| 2018 | This climate pioneer has a crazy solution for keeping the Arctic frozen |
| 2018 | A Living Hell/MDMA for PTSD |
| 2019 | The Hidden Ethnic Cleansing in Eastern Congo |
| 2021 | Turning Point: 9/11 and the War on Terror |
