= This World (TV series) =

British current affairs television programme

- Series of the current title card from BBC broadcast (September 2012 – present)
- Genre: Current affairs
- Country of origin: United Kingdom
- Original language: English

Production
- Executive producers: Karen O'Connor; Louise Norman; Lucy Hetherington; Sam Bagnall (2012–present); Sam Collyns (BBC Northern Ireland)
- Running time: BBC Two; 30–90 minutes BBC World News; 30–50 minutes
- Production company: BBC Factual

Original release
- Network: BBC Two (2004–present); BBC Two HD (2013–present); BBC World News; BBC HD (2011–13)
- Release: 4 January 2004 – present

Related
- Correspondent

This World is a current affairs programme produced by the BBC and broadcast on BBC Two in the United Kingdom, first airing on 4 January 2004. The programme also airs worldwide occasionally through BBC World News on digital services, satellite and cable in many countries. The series is mainly focused on social issues and current affairs stories around the world.

== Format ==
Series of the first title card from BBC broadcast (January 2004 until May 2012).

This World was announced in December 2003 on BBC Online and launched in early January 2004, replacing the programme Correspondent.

The website includes additional features and a discussion facility for public comment on the programmes. The BBC streams episodes in RealVideo format via its website for a limited period after they have been shown, and sells them on DVD and VHS by mail order.

Starting from 2009 onwards, the series was available and streaming at BBC iPlayer after the programme broadcast, with a limited period (Replacing with RealVideo and available in United Kingdom only).

== Episode list ==
The division between seasons of This World is based on the UK version of each episode, international episodes are based on its airing on BBC World (currently BBC World News). Subsequent airings of the international version randomly follows the original UK order (Including changes from the original title on some episodes).

=== 2004 ===
Title (Note: Title for each original title aired given from either by transcript or else from BBC Online.)	Producer	Directed by	Original release date (Note: Date for the episode originally aired on BBC Two.)
"Hells Angels"	Sam Bagnall	Sam Bagnall; Fiona Stourton	4 January 2004
The Hells Angels Motorcycle Club's membership is rapidly growing in number, with new sub-factions springing up across the world, everywhere from Brazil to Liechtenstein. The rock-loving bikers have for many years been associated with violence, but many police officers now believe that the Angels have also become a sophisticated international crime organisation, with links to the wholesale trafficking of drugs. In Canada and Scandinavia, the expansion of the gang has led to violent turf wars involving shootings, bombings and hundreds of deaths. The episode investigates on the seemingly unstoppable rise of some of the world's most dangerous men.
"Ethiopia: A Journey"	Clifford Bestall	Clifford Bestall	11 January 2004
Narrated by: Michael Buerk In 1984, with Ethiopia in the grip of famine, Michael Buerk filed two shocking reports highlighting the plight of the sick and the dying. The harrowing images prompted aid efforts from around the world, yet 20 years on the situation remains desperate, with twice as many people now on the brink of starvation. Buerk returns to Africa to meet those whose lives were irrevocably affected by the tragedy first time around - including an aid worker who found herself in the impossible situation of deciding who should live and who should die - and asks whether the developed world has helped to create a nation wholly dependent on charity.
"Football and Freedom: Stadium Exterior"	Dominic Ozanne	Dominic Ozanne	18 January 2004
"American Virgins"	Richard Alwyn	Richard Alwyn	25 January 2004
"Access to Evil (The Last Fortress)"	Ewa Ewart	-	1 February 2004
Reported by: Olenka Frenkiel Crisis talks over North Korea's nuclear weapons have already begun but, away from the show-city of Pyongyang, there's evidence that the communist power is testing its chemical weapons on women, children, families of dissidents, and political prisoners. Gaining unprecedented access, reporter Olenka Frenkiel uncovers fresh proof of this barbarous conduct from those who, until now, have been silenced.
"Iran: A Murder Mystery"	Angeli Mehta	Diana Hill	15 February 2004
Jim Muir investigates the death of a news photographer in a Tehran prison in June 2003.
"A Killer's Homecoming"	Daniela Volker	Daniela Volker	22 February 2004
"Israel's Nuclear Whistleblower"	-	-	30 May 2004
"LAPD"	Richard E Robbins; Richard Bee	Richard E Robbins	3 June 2004
"The Secret Swami"	Eamon Hardy	Eamon Hardy	17 June 2004
"Child Rescuers"	Philip Wright	Philip Wright	20 June 2004
"The Boy from the Block"	Guy Smith	Guy Smith	8 July 2004
"Saudi: The Family in Crisis"	Anthony Makin	Anthony Makin	15 July 2004
Reported by: Simon Reeve Production company: Tooth Productions Sitting on top of the world's biggest patch of oil, the extended family that runs Saudi Arabia has managed to fend off the assaults of modernity and democracy since the state's foundation. But the triple shocks of 9/11, the US-led invasion of Iraq and the al-Qaeda bombings inside the kingdom have catapulted Saudi Arabia into the limelight. The United States wants Saudi Arabia and other Arab states to embrace democracy and join it in the "war on terror", but many Saudis are suspicious of America's intent. Can Crown Prince Abdullah strike a balance between Saudi Arabia's liberals and reactionaries, and meet the increasingly vocal demands of the West?
"The Real Bangkok Hilton"	Frank Smith	Chris Jones	22 July 2004
Narrated by: Ian Curtis Production company: InFocus Asia Thailand's Bang Kwang prison, often dubbed "The Bangkok Hilton", is arguably the most infamous jail in the world. As the Thai authorities try to crack down on drug trafficking, the team gains the first ever access to the prison in which all inmates are serving sentences of more than 30 years, usually for drugs offences. The human stories from inside include a young British man struggling to stay sane and a death row prisoner pleading for a second chance.
"Dolphin Hunters"	Paul Kenyon	Paul Kenyon	9 November 2004
"Zimbabwe: The Food Fix"	Farai Sevenzo	N/A	16 November 2004
"Guinea Pig Kids"	Milena Schwager	Milena Schwager	30 November 2004
"Locked in Paradise"	Esther McWatters	Esther McWatters	7 December 2004
"Private War"	Max Jourdan; Burno Sorrentino	-	14 December 2004

=== 2005 ===
Title	Producer	Directed by	Original release date
"Tiger Traffic"	Amanda Felton	Amanda Felton	8 March 2005
Narrated by: Paul McGann Production company: Cicada Films From the forests of Siberia to the jungles of Cambodia, army veterans from Chechnya, Afghanistan and Vietnam are taking up arms to protect the tiger. Neither time nor the law is on their side. American undercover agent-turned-conservationist Steve Galster recruits army veterans and trains anti-poaching patrols in military tactics. The episode follows Galster and his men as they mastermind a sting to catch a prominent Korean animal dealer, discover a dead tigress in a sadistic snare, and secretly film traders selling tiger bones and teeth in a Myanmar market.
"It's My Country Too Muslim Americans"	Ruhi Hamid	Clifford Bestall	15 March 2005
Production company: October Films The story follows with the American Muslims which they share their own views on their country.
"Inside Israel's Jails"	Israel Goldvicht	Nick Read	22 March 2005
Production company: Israel Goldvicht and Raw TV Production Israel's jails are at bursting point. Since the start of the second intifada, the number of Palestinians behind bars has increased seven-fold. The team gains unprecedented and unrestricted access inside two of the country's highest security prisons - Beersheba and Hasharon - which hold male and female prisoners regarded by those who guard them as the most dangerous terrorists in the country.
"The Headmaster and the Headscarves"	Alison Rooper	Elizabeth C Jones	29 March 2005
Production company: In Focus Productions The banning of religious symbols in schools has become a talking point recently. In France, however, it has become law, a move that has provoked outrage among the country's 15 million Muslims. The episode follows a group of veiled girls at a Paris school who are resisting the new law in defiance of their headmaster. The girls risk expulsion and could forfeit vital exam qualifications, but the head believes school should be a bastion against a rising tide of Islamic fundamentalism.
"Iran's Nuclear Secrets"	Paul Kenyon	N/A	3 May 2005
Reported by: Paul Kenyon As Iran defies the world by restarting its nuclear programme, Paul Kenyon travels to the Islamic Republic with UN nuclear inspectors, and gains exclusive behind-the-scene access to the International Atomic Energy Agency. Iranian negotiators talk candidly about why they deceived the world over their nuclear programme for 18 years. But it takes on a new complexion now we know that Iran later abandoned the diplomacy and chose to start enriching uranium again.
"Blood and Land"	Clifford Bestall	Clifford Bestall	5 July 2005
Land reform and related violence in South Africa.
"Bad Medicine"	Iain Overton	-	12 July 2005
The international trade in counterfeit drugs.
"Property to Die For"	Christopher Mitchell	Christopher Mitchell	19 July 2005
Production company: Films of Record The episode follows a story of life and death on the Moscow property market. Virtually unknown in the West and full of sinister complexities, it's a tale of multi-million dollar scams involving corrupt judges and bureaucrats, bent policemen, fake lawyers, mafia henchmen, and a cast of hapless victims who are either dead or reduced to poverty. Investigating a series of unlawful repossessions that have been ignored by the authorities, it asks whether Russia is really living up to its claim to be an orderly democratic society, subject to the rule of law.
"At the Epicentre"	Ruhi Hamid	Ruhi Hamid	26 July 2005
Reconstruction after the 2004 Indian Ocean earthquake in Lampuuk, Aceh.
"Looking for China Girl"	Sophie Todd; Frank Smith	-	2 August 2005
Production company: InFocus Asia Around the world, approximately 105 men are born for every 100 women. In China, it's a different story entirely - up to 118 men are born for every 100 women. The Chinese government knows this serious issue needs to be addressed, but family planning is a sensitive subject amongst the world's biggest population. Following three stories - an independent women, a migrant worker desperate for a wife, and a local police unit fighting to stem the recent spate of kidnapped wives - the episode investigates a problem that could spell major trouble for China in the future.
"The Hurricane That Shook America"	-	-	12 October 2005
"The Cocaine Jungle"	Paul Kenyon	Guillermo Galdos	19 October 2005
"Bollywood: The Casting Couch"	Darius Bazargan	Darius Bazargan	26 October 2005
"Force Fed"	Rachael Turner	Rachael Turner	2 November 2005
"Underworld Art Deal"	Egmont R Koch	Egmont R Koch; Nina Svensson	9 November 2005
"The Last Stand"	Noam Shalev	Noam Shalev	10 November 2005
Israeli settlers' efforts to resist the unilateral disengagement plan in the Gaza Strip.
"Last Hope Clinic"	Tom Giles	Tom Giles	17 November 2005 (Note: Last Hope Clinic and The Jungle Beat were aired on 17 November 2005, with different timeslot between 19:00BST and 21:00BST.)
Narrated by: Stephen Barrett In the future stem cell transplants could offer hope to people with Parkinson's, multiple sclerosis, muscular dystrophy and those who have suffered strokes. But the cells are harvested from embryos and foetuses - raising ethical issues that have led to researchers having their funding cut. With the science largely unproven, the desperately ill seek help in countries with hazy legislation. The episode follows a group of patients to Ukraine to see if transplanted foetal stem cell injections can already help save or improve lives.
"The Jungle Beat"	Adrian Cowell	Adrian Cowell	17 November 2005
Narrated by: Ian Curtis Production company: Nomad Films For more than two decades, Brazil's environmental police, the IBAMA, have struggled to contain the illegal loggers, smugglers and gangs that have ravaged the Amazon rainforest. Year after year, deforestation has continued at an alarming rate - up to 25,000 square km a year. But, with greater resources and the introduction of armed services, the IBAMA is starting to fight back. The episode examines how this increased enforcement of Brazil's environmental laws will affect the frontier societies that exploit the forest, and the heated confrontations that are sure to arise.
"Death Metal Murders"	Sam Bagnall; Elena Cosentino	Sam Bagnall	24 November 2005
Narrated by: Michael Lumsden Purported links between death metal, Satanism and murders in Italy.

=== 2006 ===
Title	Producer	Directed by	Original release date
"Munich: Operation Bayonet"	Noam Shalev	Ron Maiberg	24 January 2006
Mossad assassinations following the Munich massacre.
"Kidnap Cops"	Benito Montorio	Benito Montorio	13 April 2006
Kidnappings in São Paulo.
"How to Plan a Revolution"	Shahida Tulaganova	Ivan O'Mahoney	20 April 2006
Pro-democracy youth movements in Azerbaijan.
"Drug Trials: The Dark Side"	Paul Kenyon	Paul Kenyon	27 April 2006
Clinical trials in India administered without informed consent.
"Killer's Paradise"	Giselle Portenier	Giselle Portenier	4 May 2006
Proliferation of murders of women in Guatemala.
"Putin's Palace"	Richard Denton	Richard Denton	11 May 2006
"Psychic Vietnam"	Joe Phua	Joe Phua	18 May 2006
Narrated by: Ian Curtis Production company: InFocus Asia After the end of hostilities in the Vietnam War, hundreds of thousands failed to return home. Thirty years later, Vietnamese families are still looking for their loved ones and, in desperation, have turned to a group of government-supported psychics - called Project TRK05 - who claim that they can talk to the dead. Featuring a woman made famous by her ability to locate dead bodies in the old battlefields.
"Prisoners of Katrina"	Julie Noon	Nick Read	13 August 2006
"The Tea Boy of Gaza"	Israel Goldvicht	Olly Lambert	3 October 2006
Narrated by: Ian Curtis Production company: Israel Goldvicht and Raw TV Production Meet Mahmoud, a 12-year-old boy who struggles to support his family by selling tea in the wards of Gaza's biggest hospital. Filmed before and during the Israeli re-occupation of the Gaza Strip, the story follows Mahmoud and the hospital staff as they cope with gun battles between Palestinian groups, the reality of life under the Hamas Government, and the collapse of the ceasefire with Israel that ushered in the bloodiest period the region has seen in years.
"Will Israel Bomb Iran?"	Noam Shalev	Chris Boulding	10 October 2006
"Retired Husband Syndrome"	Ewa Ewart	Ewa Ewart	14 October 2006
"Black and White (And Read All Over)"	Kate Townsend	Kate Townsend; Helen Sage	17 October 2006
"Baghdad: A Doctor's Story"	Ben Summers	-	24 October 2006
"Kidney for Sale"	Malla Grapengiesser	Nima Sarvestani	31 October 2006
In Iran the buying and selling of kidneys is regulated by the state, which claims to have eliminated waiting lists for people on dialysis. But if you don't have the money, there is no list to get on. The episode explores inside one of Iran's kidney donor clinics where the poor and desperate come to sell an organ in the hope of funding a better life.
"After a Fashion: A Tale of Two Turkeys"	Dominic Ozanne	Dominic Ozanne	16 November 2006
A look at the clash of religious and secular values in Turkey through the prism of Istanbul's fashion industry. On one side, a young, Porsche-driving, yacht-owning manufacturer of racy lingerie. On the other, the owner of an Islamic fashion house where business is on the up. Also featuring Turkey's answer to Caprice and a bevy of Brazilian lingerie models.
"Poison, Murder and Putin - Anna's Last Words"	-	-	24 November 2006

=== 2007 ===
Title (Note: Title for each original title aired in the UK given from BBC Online Archive and This World (BBC Two website))	Producer	Directed by	Original release date
"The 12-Year Old Cocaine Smuggler"	Benito Montorio	Benito Montorio	17 January 2007
Narrated by: Jason Isaacs A revelatory story exploring the life of a schoolgirl caught up in Bolivia's drug smuggling trade. It also features the work of the tough anti-drugs squads in the country's jungles and stories from some of the thousands of women jailed for drug smuggling.
"Vodka's My Poison"	Steve Grandison	Steve Grandison	14 March 2007
Reported by: John Sweeney In Russia, hundreds of people have been killed and thousands poisoned after drinking alcohol spiked with a mysterious deadly chemical. John Sweeney travels to Pskov, a city that has had to declare a state of emergency due to the number of poisonings, in an attempt to track down the cause.
"The Fight for Cuban Music"	Guillermo Galdos	N/A	1 May 2007
Narrated by: Adrian Lester The success of the film Buena Vista Social Club inspired many Cuban musicians to set about re-releasing their old songs. But American publishing company Peer Music quickly took them to court, claiming their founder bought ownership to the songs in the 1930s. The story follows with the legal battle between the company and the surviving composers, who argue that the tunes are part of Cuba's musical heritage.
"I Believe in Miracles"	Rachel Wright; Jane Sayers	Jane Sayers	8 May 2007
Narrated by: Colin Tierney Since the Roman Catholic Church reduced the number of miracles required for sainthood from four to two, new saints have been canonised. Despite this, the French pilgrimage site of Lourdes has only had 67 miracles recognised in the last 150 years. The episode discovers how the Church introduced a new sub-miracle category to boost numbers, and follows three individuals on their search for a miracle.
"Race Hate in Louisiana"	Sophie Todd	Sophie Todd	24 May 2007 (Note: Race Hate in Louisiana and Mystery Flights were aired on 24 May 2007, with different timeslot between 19:00BST and 21:00BST.)
"Mystery Flights"	Ewa Ewart	Ewa Ewart	24 May 2007
Reported by: Olenka Frenkiel Reporter Olenka Frenkiel investigate with the reports that the American, British and other European governments are colluding in a system referred to as "extraordinary rendition". Judges, journalists and civilian plane-spotters provide pieces of a puzzle that suggests the CIA has a secret programme of kidnapping citizens and transporting them abroad to be tortured or put before what even US military lawyers call "kangaroo courts".
"Hunting for Hezbollah"	Darius Bazergan	N/A	31 May 2007
A year after the Iranian-backed militants claimed victory in a bloody 33-day conflict with Israel, some claim Hezbollah are back - and more powerful than ever. Guided by a wisecracking former Shia militiaman named Dawoud, the story journeys to Beirut's darkly vibrant underbelly.
"Running from Mugabe"	Emeka Onono	Emeka Onono	7 June 2007
"Race for the Beach"	Aline Jacques	Alan Erson	14 June 2007
"All Girl Squad"	Shabnam Grewal	-	21 June 2007
"The Real Godfather"	N/A	Benito Montorio	16 September 2007
Narrated by: Steven Mackintosh Production company: Fury Films Production The world's longest manhunt came to a successful conclusion in April 2006 with the arrest of Bernardo Provenzano, the 73-year-old boss of the Sicilian Mafia, in a run-down farmhouse near the Sicilian town of Corleone. Featuring unique access to the police and judicial team who painstakingly hunted down the real-life Godfather, the episode looks at Provenzano's long reign over Cosa Nostra, his decades on the run and the dedicated police investigation that finally brought him to justice. With their boss now imprisoned, what does the future hold for the infamous Italian crime syndicate?
"Inside the Shari'ah Court"	Ruhi Hamid	Ruhi Hamid	1 October 2007
Presented by: Ruhi Hamid Production company: Films of Record Some western countries, proud of their multiculturalism, have considered allowing Muslim communities to have their own courts - like Jews and Christians. But for many, the very mention of the word "Sharia" immediately brings to mind images of amputations and stoning to death. The story goes to Nigeria, where the Sharia experiment is now six years old, to find out how Sharia law works in reality alongside the official British-style secular legal system - both inside and outside the courtroom. Behind the popular cliches, it has surprising attractions for women, and the punishments are handled in an unexpected way.
"India's Missing Girls"	Ashok Prasad	N/A	22 October 2007
Narrated by: Gary Bakewell This summer, a farmer in southern India found a two-day-old baby girl who'd been buried alive. She was one of the thousands of unwanted girls in a country where daughters are seen as a burden. Girls are often aborted as soon as their gender is known. At orphanages, most of the children are abandoned or rescued girls. The episode look at the other side of India's economic boom, where there are now so few young women that men are struggling to find brides.
"American Nightmare"	Sam Benstead	Emeka Onono	29 October 2007
With two million people expected to lose their homes in the US this year after being sold loans that they would never be able to pay, Emeka Onono travels to Cleveland, Ohio, to investigate the human cost of the worst banking crisis since the Great Depression. His story reveals how the predatory sale of "ninjas" - loans offered to those with "no income, no job and no assets" - at first brought rewards for those concerned, but eventually led to the global credit crunch that was felt in Britain during the bank run on Northern Rock.
"The Goddess and the King"	Martin Head	Martin Head	5 November 2007
"Inside Burma's Uprising"	Frank Smith; Tuktaa Jatuporn; Polly Hyman	Polly Hyman	12 November 2007
Reported by: Andrew Harding Production company: InFocus Asia In September, the tipping point for political change appeared to have arrived in Burma, as civilians, students and bloggers joined demonstrations by Buddhist monks across the country. The story follows the hopeful and eventful days before their military rulers sent troops into the capital, Rangoon, to remove the monks and quell the unrest.
"The Trillion Dollar Revolutionary"	Darren Kamp; Guillermo Galdos	-	19 November 2007
Reported by: John Sweeney John Sweeney meets Venezuelan president Hugo Chavez, who's been able to get away with anti-US statements, it's claimed, simply because his country owns huge resources of oil. Chavez boasts that he is spending the oil bonanza on the poor, but does his rhetoric match the reality of life in the barrios?
"Britain's Most Wanted"	Mark Franchetti	Nick Read	25 November 2007
Reported by: Mark Franchetti Mark Franchetti gives a candid profile of former KGB agent Andrei Lugovoi, who sparked the biggest diplomatic crisis since the Cold War when he became Scotland Yard's prime suspect in the poisoning of Alexander Litvinenko in 2006. As he prepares to stand in this week's Russian parliamentary elections, the investigation takes places the Litvinenko murder mystery in the context of a newly resurgent Russia, where Lugovoi is regarded by many as a hero.

=== 2008 ===
Title	Producer	Directed by	Original release date
"The Boys from Baghdad High"	Ivan O'Mahoney; Laura Winter	Ivan O'Mahoney; Laura Winter	8 January 2008
Compelling story chronicling the friendship of four Iraqi classmates in Baghdad of Kurdish, Christian, Shia and mixed Sunni-Shia backgrounds. In a city torn apart by sectarian violence, the boys film their own experiences during one academic year, capturing how the dangers that exist all around them affect their studies, normal teenage distractions - such as texting girlfriends, playing computer games and reciting rap songs - and the crucial decisions on whether to stay in the city or leave, which will ultimately impact on all their futures.
"Girl Racer"	Darius Bazargan	Darius Bazargan	19 February 2008
Narrated by: Ian Curtis The episode follows with Laleh Seddigh from Tehran who became a national motor sports champion after racing against male drivers. She lives in a society where females can become engineers and MPs, yet face execution for "moral" crimes such as adultery.
"Diamonds and Justice"	Olenka Frenkiel	Olly Bootle	26 February 2008
"Deep South Divide"	Sophie Todd	Sophie Todd	4 March 2008
"Miss Gulag"	Olly Bootle; Irina Voder; Raphaela Neihausen	Maria Yatskova	11 March 2008
"Lethal Solution"	Steven Grandison	Steven Grandison	18 March 2008
Reported by: Vivien White Death by lethal injection was devised to be a humane method of execution, but can result in a prolonged and painful end if not administered correctly. As the US Supreme Court considers whether this violates the constitution's prohibition against "cruel and unusual" punishment, reporter Vivian White meets those involved in the controversy.
"Massacre of Virginia Tech"	Jonathan Hacker	Jonathan Hacker	8 April 2008
Narrated by: Mark Strong Production company: ORTV Production Early on the morning of 16 April 2007, 23-year-old student Seung-Hui Cho opened fire on the Virginia Tech campus in America, killing 32 people and wounding 25 others before turning the gun on himself. The incident became the biggest mass shooting in peacetime US history. In the lead up to the first anniversary of that tragic day, the episode interviews key witnesses in an attempt to understand what might have caused Cho, a young man with no criminal history, to plan and carry out mass murder.
"Bannatyne Takes on Big Tobacco"	Debbie Christie	Alison Pinkey	1 July 2008
Presented by: Duncan Bannatyne Production company: Hardcash Productions Duncan Bannatyne heads to Africa to investigate with the increasing numbers of young people are taking up the habit. There he meets children as young as ten who not just only smoke, but try to make their living from selling cigarettes. Having gathered evidence of the extraordinary marketing practices, the uncompromising Scot prepares to confront the company on his return to Britain.
"Battle of the Bishops"	Nick Read	Nick Read	21 July 2008
"Murder in the Snow"	Sally Ingleton	Mark Gould	10 November 2008
Narrated by: John Simm Production company: 360 Degree Films In September 2006, Chinese border guards opened fire on some Tibetan refugees trying to flee to Nepal over the Himalayas. A group of Western mountaineers filmed the tragedy and their footage, mixed with evidence from survivors, paints a powerful picture of death and politics at the top of the world.
"The Man Who Armed the World"	Nick Davidson	Nick Davidson	17 November 2008
Reported by: Tom Mangold The story follows behind the international operation that brought Russian businessman Viktor Bout to justice. One of the world's most notorious arms dealers and sanctions busters, he now languishes in a Bangkok prison facing extradition to the US.
"An American Time Bomb"	Jonathan Brunert	Patrick Creadon	24 November 2008
As America's national debt breaks the ten trillion dollar mark, David Walker argues that the US economy is close to imploding, particularly if president-elect Barack Obama has, as many predict, to spend his way out of the impending recession.
"Forced to Marry"	Ruhi Hamid	Ruhi Hamid	1 December 2008
Presented by: Saira Khan Production company: BBC Scotland Saira Khan looks into some of the dramatic stories of British Asians who have been forced to marry against their will. She reports on some of the rescues that have been made in rural Pakistani communities and the reason in the 21st century such a practice is still occurring.

=== 2009 ===
Title	Producer	Directed by	Original release date
"Mandela at 90"	Denis Strauss; Lucy Hetherington; Sam Bagnall	Clifford Bestall	31 January 2009
"Escaping North Korea"	Jonathan Brunert	N/A	6 April 2009
Reported by: Olenka Frenkiel The episode follow the stories of North Koreans who are risking everything from torture to execution to escape their homeland.
"The Madoff Hustle"	Roger Corke	-	28 June 2009
"Gypsy Child Thieves"	Liviu Tipuriță	Liviu Tipuriță	2 September 2009
"An Iranian 'Martyr'"	Monica Garnsey; Diana Martin	Monica Garnsey	24 November 2009
Narrated by: Jack Fortune Production company: Ronachan Films On 20 June this year in Tehran, eight days after Iran's disputed election, a young Iranian woman was shot in the street. The video of Neda Agha Soltan's death, filmed on a mobile phone, was seen by millions around the world. Many young Iranians have claimed her as a martyr for Iran's protest movement, while the Iranian regime has tried to blame the West. The episode tells the story of Neda, with exclusive accounts from those who really knew her.
"Can Obama Save the Planet?"	Sara Afshar; Diana Martin	Sara Afshar	25 November 2009
"Stalin's Return"	Roger Corke	Roger Corke	2 December 2009
Reported by: John Sweeney Production company: BBC Northern Ireland John Sweeney travels more than 5,000 miles through the old Soviet Union, from Joseph Stalin's birthplace in Georgia to a former labour camp in Russia, to investigate whether the dictator's reputation is being rehabilitated despite the fact he was one of the 20th century's most notorious mass murderers.

=== 2010 ===
Title	Producer	Directed by	Original release date
"Closing Guantanamo"	Alex Cooke; Diana Martin	Alex Cooke	3 January 2010
"Obama and Me"	John Blystone; Diana Martin	John Blystone	19 January 2010
"Tsunami: Five Years On"	Jonathan Brunert; Ashok Prasad; Diana Martin	Jonathan Brunert	27 January 2010
"Mexico's Drug War"	Elena Cosentino	Elena Cosentino	7 February 2010
"Stolen Brides"	Dimitri Collingridge; Nick Sturdee	-	11 August 2010
"Surviving Haiti"	Andrew Carter; Elena Cosentino	-	18 August 2010
"The Wounded Platoon"	Dan Edge; Christopher Buchanan	Dan Edge	25 August 2010
"Hostage in the Jungle"	Kate Horne	Angus Macqueen	20 October 2010
"Tea Party America"	Alex Cooke	Alex Cooke	1 November 2010
Reported by: Andrew Neil Production company: Renegade Productions An examination of the so-called Tea Party, a right-wing political movement; as the US prepares to vote in mid-term elections, journalist Andrew Neil is on a whistle-stop tour to find out what is behind the movement and its causes to spread.
"Pakistan's Flood Doctor"	Nikki Millard	Nikki Millard	13 December 2010
Reported by: Jane Corbin Following the life-saving work of Doctor Shershah Syed during the time of the devastating floods in Pakistan.

=== 2011 ===
Title (Note: Title for each original title aired given from BBC Two.)	Producer	Directed by	Original release date
"The Paedophile Hunters"	Michael Chrisman	Simon Egan	30 January 2011
Narrated by: Paul Rhys Production company: Hardcash Productions The episode follows the agents of the US Immigration and Customs Enforcement (ICE) in Cambodia as they pursue American paedophile sex tourists.
"Geert Wilders: Europe's Most Dangerous Man?"	Joost van der Valk; Mags Gavan	Joost van der Valk; Mags Gavan	14 February 2011
Narrated by: Jack Fortune Production company: Red Rebel Films, Pieter van Huystee Films Geert Wilders, who was known as one of the most controversial of Dutch politician in the Netherlands - the story tracks from campaigning in the elections, meeting members of the anti-Islamic network who back him, and to expose a conspiracy theory promoting the belief that Islam is taking over Europe.
"Nicolas Sarkozy: President Bling-Bling?"	Marion Milne; Detlef Siebert	-	21 March 2011
"Chilean Miners: What Happened Next"	-	Guillermo Galdos; Steven Grandison	28 March 2011
Production company: Ronachan Films, Pacha Films The story follows three of the Chilean miners that have coped with life in the media spotlight after being trapped underground for 69 days at Chile's San José mine.
"The Invasion of Lampedusa"	Lottie Gammon	Olly Lambert	14 June 2011
Narrated by: Andrew Sachs Production company: Ronachan Films The story follows how a crisis on a tiny island in the middle of the Mediterranean is changing the face of immigration in Europe. In spring 2011, in the wake of the uprisings across the Arab world, the Italian island of Lampedusa, just 70 miles from the African coast, has seen the arrival of over 40,000 migrants from Tunisia and Libya. It also charts how, within weeks, its small migrant reception centre is overflowing, and the island's tourist economy faces meltdown. The islanders openly revolt, blockading the small port and riot in the streets.
"The Camorra: Italy's Bloodiest Mafia"	Roger Corke	Roger Corke	13 July 2011
Reported by: Mark Franchetti The story travels to Naples in Italy - where Mark Franchetti investigates on one of the bloodiest organized mafia and largest criminal syndicate - The Camorra.
"Thailand - Justice Under Fire"	Mark Alden	Jonathan Jones	7 August 2011
Reported by: Fergal Keane Victim's families struggle and seek the truth about what happened to their loved ones who were killed in a bloody masacre in central Bangkok, Thailand.
"Spain's Stolen Babies"	Steven Grandison	Steven Grandison	18 October 2011
Presented by: Katya Adler Katya Adler explores the impact of Spain's stolen baby scandal through the eyes of the children and parents who were separated at birth, and who are now desperate to find their relatives.
"Return of the Lost Boys of Sudan"	Nick Read	Nick Read	12 December 2011
Narrated by: Sophie Okonedo Production company: October Films With the creation of South Sudan as an independent country, the story explores with the experience of three Sudanese "Lost Boys" as they return to Sudan 20 years after fleeing their homes to escape Civil War.

=== 2012 ===
Title	Producer	Directed by	Original release date	
"Egypt - Children of the Revolution"	Inigo Gilmore	May Abdalla	3 February 2012	
Narrated by: Jack Fortune Production company: Ronachan Films The story traces an extraordinary journey for three young activists from their dreams for a new future to the reality of the Egyptian revolution after one of the Arab world's most brutal and entrenched dictatorships, Hosni Mubarak - who was stepped down as president in 2011.
"Inside the Meltdown"	Dan Edge; Hiro Saso; Mai Nishiyama	Dan Edge	23 February 2012	
Narrated by: Rupert Graves Production company: Quicksilver Media The story takes place at Fukushima, Japan - which unfolding the desperate hours and days after nuclear disaster as when the fate of thousands of Japanese citizens fell into the hands of a small corps of engineers, firemen and soldiers who risked their lives to prevent the Daiichi nuclear complex from complete meltdown.
"The Fastest Changing Place on Earth"	Victoria Bell	Victoria Bell	5 March 2012	
Presented by: Carrie Gracie The episode tells the story of White Horse Village, a tiny farming community deep in rural China. A decade ago, it became part of the biggest urbanisation project in human history, as the Chinese government decided to take half a billion farmers and turn them into city-dwelling consumers. It is a project with a speed and scale unimaginable anywhere else on Earth. In just ten years, the Chinese Government plan to build thousands of new cities, a new road network to rival that of the USA and 300 of the world's biggest dams. Carrie Gracie follows the lives of three local people during this upheaval, filmed over the past six years.
"Interviews Before Execution: A Chinese Talk Show"	James Jones	James Jones	12 March 2012	
Narrated by: Steven Mackintosh Production company: LIC Production The episode takes a look at Chinese television programme: Interviews Before Execution, in which death row inmates are interviewed by a reporter shortly before they are executed.
"The Mormon Candidate"	James Jones; Daniel Bogado	James Jones	27 March 2012	
Reported by: John Sweeney Production company: BBC Northern Ireland John Sweeney travels to Utah and examine about Mitt Romney and his Mormon beliefs.
"Norway's Massacre"	Anne Leer; Elin Moe	Edward Watts	15 April 2012	
Narrated by: Hermione Norris Production company: BBC Northern Ireland The story tracks back to the massacre at Oslo, Norway in 2011.
"The Shame of the Catholic Church"	Alison Millar	Alison Millar	1 May 2012	
Reported by: Darragh MacIntyre Production company: BBC Northern Ireland Darragh MacIntyre investigates with the failure of the Catholic Church over by child abuse that claims to the very top of the Irish church in Ireland.
"Great Euro Crisis"	Jeremy Bristow	Jeremy Bristow	9 May 2012	
Presented by: Michael Portillo Production company: OR Media Limited Michael Portillo visits Greece to Germany to explore the implications of the Euro crisis which has affected attitudes and monetary union.
"Aung San Suu Kyi: The Choice"	Sue Summers; Angus McQueen	Angus McQueen	22 September 2012	N/A
Narrated by: Gina McKee Production company: Ronachan Films, Finestripe Productions Aung San Suu Kyi - a Burmese political hero, which tells about her own extraordinary personal and political story as she turned from Oxford housewife into national leader and was later become an international icon of resistance.
"Obama: What Happened to Hope?"	Fatima Salaria	Fatima Salaria	4 November 2012	N/A
Presented by: Andrew Marr Andrew Marr looks back at Barack Obama's first term in the office which has lived up to his expectations.
"Cuba"	Tom McCarthy	Tom McCarthy	11 December 2012	12 January 2013
Presented by: Simon Reeve Simon Reeve heads to Cuba - where the iconic island undergoes sweeping and radical economic changes in preparation for life after Fidel Castro and a new relationship with the United States, as the story look at how economic liberalisation is taking hold of communist country.
"The Great Spanish Crash"	Alicia Arce	Alicia Arce	16 December 2012	9 February 2013
Reported by: Paul Mason In Spain, Paul Mason travels to observe as the economy crisis could spreadout with another casualty by the Eurozone.

=== 2013 ===
Title (Note: Title for each original title aired in the UK. Titles from BBC World News may refer either to original title or occasionally the title given on its website.)	Producer	Directed by	Original release date	
"America's Poor Kids"	Lauren Mucciolo	Jezza Neumann	6 March 2013	6 April 2013
Narrated by: Sophie Okonedo Production company: True Vision As the child poverty has reached record levels with more than 16 million children affected in the United States, the stories looked at the lives of three children whose families are struggling to survive - by the express of view in the modern states of life.
"A History of Syria"	Robin Barnwell	Robin Barnwell	11 March 2013	16 March 2013
Presented by: Dan Snow Production company: BBC Northern Ireland Dan Snow takes a journey to Syria, which looked at the complex past of the civil war and the roots of the current crisis.
"Iraq: Did My Son Die in Vain?"	Janet Harris	Janet Harris	20 March 2013	23 March 2013
Narrated by: Katy Cavanagh Geoff Dunsmore revisits to Basra in Iraq where his son - Chris Dunsmore, an RAF reservist who was killed in 2007.
"South Africa: The Massacre That Changed a Nation" "The Massacre That Changed South Africa"	John Thynne	John Thynne	24 March 2013	4 May 2013
Presented by: Peter Hain Peter Hain MP heads to Johannesburg in South Africa and uncover the stories on the shooting of 34 protesting miners outside Marikana platinum mine in 2012.
"The Mafia's Secret Bunkers"	Elena Cosentino	Elena Cosentino	1 May 2013	N/A
Presented by: John Dickie Production company: Lion Television Historian John Dickie investigates the story of Italy's elusive powerful crime network and Europe’s biggest cocaine traffickers - 'Ndrangheta', which uncovers inside the secret world of their amazing underground empire.
"India's Supersize Kids"	Andy Wells	Andy Wells	13 August 2013	28 September 2013
Presented by: Anita Rani Production company: OR Media Limited Anita Rani investigates with a growing epidemic of childhood obesity in India.
"America's Stoned Kids"	Chris Alcock	Chris Alcock	24 August 2013	12 October 2013
Presented by: Professor John Marsden Clinical Psychologist and addiction expert Professor John Marsden travels to the state capital in Denver, Colorado to investigate the impact of cannabis legalization on a country that already suffering an epidemic of teenage marijuana use.
"Terror in the Desert"	Jane Corbin; Dimitri Collingridge	Dimitri Collingridge	31 August 2013	21 September 2013
Reported by: Jane Corbin Production company: Blakeway Productions The episode follows the British survivors of the January 2013 terrorist attack at Amenas gas plant in Algeria as they told their dramatic and harrowing stories.
"History of Congo"	Robin Barnwell	Robin Barnwell	9 October 2013	2 November 2013
Presented by: Dan Snow Production company: BBC Northern Ireland Dan Snow travels to Congo, seeking to provide some insight into the vast central African country’s history, its colonial legacy, post-independence chaos, and endemic corruption.
"No Sex Please, We're Japanese" "The Great Japanese Retirement"	John Holdsworth	John Holdsworth	24 October 2013	9 November 2013
Presented by: Anita Rani First part of the Population series. (Note: Aired as the part of the Population Series in United Kingdom.) Anita Rani travel across Japan to investigate on the population problem that cause the birth rate collapsed, and the results of Japanese men and women that have been drifted apart.
"World's Busiest Maternity Ward"	Elena Cosentino	Elena Cosentino	31 October 2013	4 January 2014
Presented by: Anita Rani Second part of the Population series. Anita Rani travels to Manila - known as one of world’s most densely populated cities in the Philippines, where she encounters across the developing world in general that dealts with the fastest growing population.
"Don't Panic - The Truth about Population"	Dan Hillman	N/A	7 November 2013	N/A
Presented by: Professor Hans Rosling Production company: The Open University, Wingspan Productions The third and final part of the Population series. Swedish statistician, Professor Hans Rosling presents as 'live' studio event featuring cutting-edge 3D infographics painting a vivid picture of a world that has changed in ways to the people barely understand – often for the better.

=== 2014 ===
Title	Producer	Directed by	Original release date	
"The Tea Trail"	Adam Warner	Adam Warner	12 January 2014	15 February 2014
Presented by: Simon Reeve In Kenya and Uganda, Simon Reeve follows the tea production process and their impacts, including meet some millions of people who "pick, pack and transport" the tea.
"The Coffee Trail"	Andy Wells	Andy Wells	26 January 2014	22 February 2014
Presented by: Simon Reeve Simon Reeve embarks on a journey across Vietnam, which in just over 30 years has become the second largest coffee producer in the world and the number one source in UK. He discovers the impact the rapidly expanding coffee market has had on a nation of small farms. He begins his journey in Hanoi before heading into Vietnam’s exotic highlands where, in the aftermath of the war with America, a vast coffee-growing programme was launched to help the country‘s economic recovery – but has led to widespread environmental damage.
"How China Fooled the World"	Guy Smith	Guy Smith	18 February 2014	8 March 2014
Presented by: Robert Peston Robert Peston discusses the fact that China is now the second largest economy in the world and for the last 30 years its economy has been growing at an astonishing rate. While the west has been in the grip of the worst recession in a generation, China’s economic miracle has wowed the world, with spending and investment on a scale never seen before in human history.
"Copacabana Palace"	N/A	N/A	12 May 2014	N/A
Narrated by: David Morrissey With the preparation for the upcoming month of the World Cup 2014 in Brazil, the episode takes place at one of the iconic and exclusive hotel - Rio de Janeiro's Copacabana Palace, which tells the story of the workers and visitors - where it has played host to everyone from its existence.
"The Secret Life of Your Clothes"	Andy Wells	Andy Wells	14 July 2014	23 January 2015
Presented by: Ade Adepitan Production company: Firecrest Films Ade Adepitan follows the trail of clothing that was donated to a charity shop and was subsequently sent to Ghana.
"Clothes to Die For"	Sarah Hamilton	Zara Hayes	21 July 2014	N/A
Narrated by: Katy Cavanagh Production company: Quicksilver Media The story follows the events surrounding the collapse of the Rana Plaza Building in Bangladesh in 2013, which killed 1,134 garment workers. At its heart are the stories of the workers in the building, often young women making clothes for leading western brands. They recount their shocking stories of being buried in the rubble, but also explain how their jobs, despite pitiful pay and long hours, gave them much-wanted independence.
"Ireland's Lost Babies"	John O'Kane	John O'Kane	17 September 2014	18 October 2014
Presented by: Martin Sixsmith Production company: BBC Northern Ireland After the story of Philomena was shown on the film, Martin Sixsmith travels to Ireland and the United States uncovering the stories of parents and children that are involved with a transatlantic adoption trade.
"Life in Solitary"	Elizabeth C. Jones	Dan Edge	21 September 2014	N/A
Narrated by: Steven Mackintosh Production company: Mongoose Pictures The story takes place at Maine State Prison in Warren, featuring the life of staff in order to improve the system and release some of the most dangerous prisoners back into the general population.
"Terror at the Mall"	Dan Reed	Dan Reed	24 September 2014	N/A
Narrated by: Michael Lumsden Production company: Amos Pictures Pulled from thousands of hours of security footage with more than a hundred cameras, the story takes viewers inside Kenya’s Westgate Shopping Mall as the siege unfolds.
"Rwanda's Untold Story"	Jane Corbin; John Conroy	John Conroy	1 October 2014	N/A
Reported by: Jane Corbin Jane Corbin discovers the evidence that challenges the accepted story for one of the most terrifying events after twenty years from the Rwandan genocide.

=== 2015 ===
Title	Producer	Directed by	Original release date	
"Surviving Sandy Hook"	Sarah Foudy	Jezza Neumann	4 March 2015	N/A
Narrated by: Hugh Bonneville Production company: True Vision The story follows at Sandy Hook Elementary School in Newtown, Connecticut, where it reveals the perspective of the families of victims and survivors as they rebuild their lives after the shooting events in December 2012.
"Secrets of Mexico's Drug War"	Elena Cosentino	Elena Cosentino	11 March 2015	N/A
Narrated by: David Morrissey After the events of Chapo Guzman's arrest in February 2014, the story follows up to explore the various ways on the US government enforcement agencies that have become bound up in the business of Mexico’s notorious Sinaloa Cartel, seemingly in the name of bringing down its kingpins.
"Quelle Catastrophe! France" "Robert Peston: On France"	Adam Jessel	Adam Jessel	13 March 2015	18 April 2015
Presented by: Robert Peston Robert Peston investigates the rise of Marine Le Pen and the Front National in France, and the economic stagnation that threatening France's way of life which could determine by the European Union themselves.
"Britain's Jihadi Brides"	Fatima Salaria	Fatima Salaria	8 April 2015	16 May 2015
Narrated by: Steven Mackintosh First part of the ISIS series. (Note: Aired as the part of the ISIS Series.) The episode follows British girls and how they had been attracted and traveled across to Islamic State in Syria - where the radicals were trying to lured them with a mixture of slick marketing, social media and religious fervour.
"Kill the Christians" "Killing Christianity"	Jane Corbin; Robin Barnwell	Robin Barnwell	15 April 2015	23 May 2015
Reported by: Jane Corbin The second part of the ISIS series. Jane Corbin travel across the Middle East to examine why Christianity is facing the greatest threat to its existence as hundreds of thousands of Christians are fleeing from the Islamic extremists, conflict and persecution.
"World's Richest Terror Army"	Mike Rudin	Mike Rudin	22 April 2015	30 May 2015
Reported by: Peter Taylor The third and final part of the ISIS series. Peter Taylor investigates at the wealth of the so called Islamic State in the Middle East, together for the first time TV interview with an imprisoned former senior leader of IS leadership.
"Outbreak: The Truth About Ebola"	Sasha Achilli	Dan Edge	1 June 2015	N/A
Narrated by: Shaun Dooley Production company: Quicksilver Media, Mongoose Pictures In West Africa, the Ebola outbreak appears to be in abeyance, having killed thousands. The story traces the most recent outbreak back to the father of so-called Patient Zero – the first fatality of the recent outbreak – and meets the local officials and international aid workers who were still trying to figure out what they could and should have done better.
"The Bin Laden Conspiracy?"	Michael Rudin	Michael Rudin	17 June 2015	4 July 2015
Reported by: Jane Corbin Jane Corbin reports the evidence with various conspiracy theories about Bin Laden's death, where the story recounts how a special crack team of American special forces stormed into a compound at Abbottabad in Pakistan.
"Don't Panic - How to End Poverty in 15 Years"	Dan Hillman	N/A	23 September 2015	N/A
Presented by: Professor Hans Rosling Production company: The Open University, Wingspan Productions Swedish statistical showman Professor Hans Rosling returns on-stage, featuring with more holographic-style projection for facts and figures that shows his consideration to put an end from extreme poverty across the world.

=== 2016 ===
Title	Producer	Directed by	Original release date	
"Three Days of Terror: The Charlie Hebdo Attacks"	Dan Reed	Dan Reed	6 January 2016	N/A
Narrated by: Dan Reed Production company: Amos Pictures Dan Reed uncovers the story on the unseen footage of the massacre at Charlie Hebdo magazine and of the three days of horror that followed, leaving 20 dead and a nation traumatised. The film also include the first strike where Islamist gunmen attack at kosher grocery store in Paris.
"World War Three: Inside the War Room"	Gabriel Range	Gabriel Range	3 February 2016	N/A
A dramatic and at times frighteningly real drama illustrating how easily global events can spiral out of control. The episode explores the nightmare imagined scenario in which the West finds itself on the brink of a nuclear confrontation with Russia. A real war room bunker is rigged with cameras and six top military, political and diplomatic figures from around the world are sealed in it. Despite their vastly different views, they have to work together and come to decisions on each of the scenarios they are presented with in a documentary that reaches right into the heart of the most serious threat to the world.
"The Great Chinese Crash?"	Jane McMullen	Jane McMullen	17 February 2016	4 March 2016
Presented by: Robert Peston Robert Peston reports on the dramatic economic slowdown which affects China and the rest of the world.
"Inside the Billionaire's Wardrobe"	Stephen Mizelas	Stephen Mizelas	26 April 2016	N/A
Presented by: Reggie Yates Reggie Yates investigate the reality behind the "luxury" fashion which goes into the production and sale of the most expensive animal wares.
"The New Gypsy Kings"	Liviu Tipuriță	Liviu Tipuriță	16 June 2016	N/A
Reported by: Liviu Tipuriță Filmmaker Liviu Tipuriță explores inside the extreme world of Romania's new traditional Gypsy music and contemporary pop, with lyrics that glorify money, fast cars, glamour and bling.
"Frat Boys: Inside America's Fraternities"	Chris Taylor; Sarah Foudy	Chris Taylor	23 June 2016	3 September 2016
Narrated by: Joseph Radcliffe The story follows at the University of Central Florida which spending a term with the group of American college fraternity boys as they embark on the pledging process, when new recruits have to prove themselves before they can become a fraternity brother. It also looks at the issues with barbaric initiation rituals, known as hazing, and some argue that the way the fraternity system is set up allows sexual assaults to be occur.
"Unarmed Black Male"	James Jones; Sarah Foudy	James Jones	2 November 2016	N/A
A 90-minute story follows the cases of US police officers involved in the shooting of black men.

=== 2017 ===
Title	Producer	Directed by	Original release date	
"Transgender Kids: Who Knows Best?"	John Conroy	John Conroy	12 January 2017	1 April 2017
The story explores the divisive debate over whether a child should be free to make permanent changes to their gender. Dr Kenneth Zucker once ran the largest public clinic in Toronto for treating children and adolescents with gender dysphoria: an often violent feeling that the body they were born in does not match their true gender. But then he was fired and his clinic closed down amid comparisons to a religious zealot trying to 'cure' homosexuality. His supporters believe he is a victim of a virulent form of transgender politics that stifles freedom of speech. It features interviews with Zucker, his patients, the families, the clinicians and transgender activists.
"After Brexit: The Battle for Europe"	Jane McMullen	Jane McMullen	9 February 2017	18 February 2017
Presented by: Katya Adler As the UK begin its process for leaving the EU after its referendum results, Katya Adler travels across the European continent examining whether the Union can survive by facing the biggest challenge in its 60-year history.
"Russia's Hooligan Army"	Alex Stockley Von Statzer; Diana Aroutiounova	Alex Stockley Von Statzer	16 February 2017	N/A
With the conflict between Russian and England supporters at Marseille during the last summer on 2016 European Championships, Russian hooligans injured over 100 England supporters with two people in a coma. It has raised major concerns before Russia hosts the 2018 World Cup. The story then follows the filmmaker Alex Stockley Von Statzer, who travels to Russia to track down, for a rare interview, members of the Orel Butchers - uncovering a world where aggressiveness has become a sign of honour and an icon of newly resurgent Russian masculinity.
"Born Too White"	Clare Richards	Clare Richards	23 February 2017	N/A
Presented by: Oscar Duke Production company: Dragonfly Film and Television The episode exploring the shameful plight of albino people in east Africa. Oscar Duke, a NHS doctor who also has albinism, travels to Malawi and Tanzania where albinos are not merely persecuted and shunned but frequently attacked and even killed. He meet with east Africa’s albinos and – illuminatingly, if enragingly – their tormentors, including a man imprisoned for murder.
"The Attack: Terror in the UK"	Gabriel Range	Gabriel Range	2 March 2017	N/A
With the UK terror threat level at "severe", the drama-documentary episode based on real-life stories focuses from inside the UK’s counter terrorism unit. It tells the incident of an ISIS-inspired terrorist group planning a firearms attack, and follows with the ongoing police investigation. The story follows with Joseph, a young man who, while in prison on drugs charges, is recruited and radicalised by an Islamic extremist. Through drama and interviews, it also reveals how UK agencies are working to keep the public safe from what experts fear is the most likely scenario for a UK next major terror attack.
"Colombia"	Ruth Mayer; Fausto Appiolaza	Ruth Mayer	16 April 2017	24 February 2018
Presented by: Simon Reeve Simon Reeve travels to Colombia - as 50 years of civil war draws to a close in the wake of a recently signed peace deal. He meets guerrilla fighters who have pledged to lay down arms, but also discovers a negative consequence of their disarming, as the paramilitary gangs that control the drugs trade grow in power. He travels through the country with coca farmers, who discuss the government support they will need in the turbulent times ahead, as poverty and land ownership becoming pressing issues.
"North Korea: Murder in the Family"	Jane McMullen	Jane McMullen	13 August 2017	N/A
The story follows the assassination of the North Korean dictator’s half-brother, Kim Jong-nam - who was attacked at Kuala Lumpur airport in February by using the lethal nerve agent VX. The incident - caught on CCTV - uncovers the activities of North Korean secret agents who were at the airport on the day of his murder, as well as to unravel the family feud that led to it and the international business network that has allowed the Kim family to stay in power for nearly 70 years.
"Calais, The End of the Jungle"	Dan Reed	Dan Reed	24 October 2017	N/A
Production company: Amos Pictures A year since the infamous shantytown - also dubbed as the 'Jungle', where the largest migrant settlement is being dismantled and burned down into chaos. The story, shot deep inside the notorious migrant camp, follows the filmmaker Dan Reed as he follows up in the end of Calais Jungle for days, capturing the constant, miserable attempts to escape to the UK as well as talking to aid volunteers and French officials.
"The Balfour Declaration: Britain's Promise to the Holy Land" "The Balfour Declaration: The Promise to the Holy Land"	Katherine Churcher	Katherine Churcher	31 October 2017	4 November 2017
Reported by: Jane Corbin Jane Corbin explores the aims of the Balfour Declaration, which, in 1917, saw the British government support the creation of 'a national home for the Jewish people' in Palestine. The legacy of the declaration is one that she has watched unfold over the last 30 years - charting the conflict on both sides. It also reveals that she has a personal link through one of her own ancestors, British politician and Cabinet minister Leo Amery, who played a key part in drafting the document and then oversaw British rule in Palestine during the 1920s.

=== 2018 ===
Title	Producer	Directed by	Original release date	
"Murdered for Love? Samia Shahid"	Sasha Achilli	Sasha Achilli	21 February 2018	N/A
The episode follows the life of Samia Shahid before she travels to Pakistan and is killed six days later in July 2016.
"Burma (Part 1)"	Ruth Mayer	Ruth Mayer	13 May 2018	8 September 2018
Presented by: Simon Reeve Part one of a two-part documentary exploring the country in the aftermath of the recent humanitarian crisis in which thousands of Rohingya Muslims were driven from their homes by the military. Simon visits Burma's Buddhist heartlands, including the ancient capital of Bagan, and meets the city's controversial nationalist monks. While the region affected by the military crackdown is off limits, he is able to visit the world's biggest refugee camp in Bangladesh, and meet people traumatised by the violence.
"Nigeria's Stolen Daughters"	Karen Edwards	Karen Edwards; Genma Atwal	15 May 2018	N/A
Production company: Blakeway Productions The episode follows a group of school girls as they adapt to life after their imprisonment at the hands of Boko Haram at Chibok in Northern Nigeria. Until recently, they were set to be released and reunited with their family members whom they have not seen since that day they went missing and the process of coming to terms with what has happened to them. It also meets some of the 'Forgotten Girls' who have fallen prey to Boko Haram in Maidugari. They have deeply disturbing stories of their treatment and their troubles have not ended on their escape from the forest - as they are often treated with suspicion due to their connection with Boko Haram.
"Burma (Part 2)"	Ruth Mayer	Ruth Mayer	20 May 2018	15 September 2018
"Japan’s Secret Shame"	Erica Jenkin	Erica Jenkin	28 June 2018	N/A
"Escape from Dubai: The Mystery of the Missing Princess"	Jane McMullen	Jane McMullen	6 December 2018	N/A

=== 2019 ===
Title	Producer	Directed by	Original release date	
"Revolution in Ruins: The Hugo Chavez Story"	Ruth Mayer	Ruth Mayer	16 January 2019	23 March 2019
"Shadow Commander: Iran’s Military Mastermind"	Sasha Achilli	Sasha Achilli	14 March 2019	N/A
"Anna: The Woman Who Went to Fight ISIS"	Marina Parker	Marina Parker	3 July 2019	N/A

=== 2020 ===
Title	Producer	Directed by	Original release date
"Terror in Paradise"	Mike Rudin	Mike Rudin	6 April 2020
"Costa del Narcos"	Almudena Garcia-Parrado	Almudena Garcia-Parrado	26 April 2020
"Italy's Frontline: A Doctor's Diary"	Daniel Edge	Sasha Joelle Achilli	29 June 2020
"Aung San Suu Kyi: The Fall of an Icon"	Katherine Churcher	Katherine Churcher	3 November 2020

=== 2021 ===
Title	Producer	Directed by	Original release date
"54 Days: China and the Pandemic (1)"	Jane McMullen	Jane McMullen	27 January 2021
"54 Days: America and the Pandemic (2)"	Sasha Joelle Achilli	Sasha Joelle Achilli	2 February 2021
"China's Magic Weapon"	Jane Corbin	Jane Corbin	23 August 2021

=== 2022 ===
Title	Producer	Directed by	Original release date
"Why Ships Crash: The Suez Canal Collision"	Tom Cook	Alessandra Bonomolo	18 January 2022
"The Whistleblowers: Inside the UN"	Jennifer O’Mahony	Ben Steele	15 June 2022
"Why Buildings Collapse: Miami Beachfront Disaster"	Carlo Massarella	Unknown	5 July 2022
"Big Oil v the World: Denial"	Daniel Edge	Jane McMullen	21 July 2022
"Big Oil v the World: Doubt"	Daniel Edge	Gesbeen Mohammad	28 July 2022
"Big Oil v the World: Delay"	Daniel Edge	Robin Barnwell	4 August 2022

=== Specials ===
Title	Producer	Original release date
"One Day of War"	Will Daws	27 May 2004
Reported by: Rageh Omaar Production company: TLC Every 30 seconds, war, civil or international, costs two people their lives. Many of these wars receive very little attention from the world's media. Some have been fought for years, and there seems little hope of a peaceful solution. Filmmakers follow 16 people in a single day to reveal the human stories behind the conflicts.
"Coming of Age"	Kiran Soni	22 February 2005
Narrated by: Amanda St. John Military conscription, a first hunting trip and a circumcision - the symbolic transformation from childhood to adulthood. From the edge of the Arctic Circle and the closeted world of the Japanese geisha, to the Russian forest and the training grounds of the world's largest army, these poignant chronicles of adolescence disclose the universal themes that unite - and divide - us all.
"Living Positive"	Sarah Waldron	1 December 2005
Narrated by: Andrew Lincoln From the streets of Phnom Penh to the nightclubs of Rio de Janeiro, a day in the lives of six very different people from around the world, with one thing in common - they are all HIV-positive. On World Aids Day, their inspirational stories provide an insight into life with one of the most feared viruses on Earth.
"Child Slavery"	Barbara Arvanitidis	26 March 2007
Reported by: Rageh Omaar Despite the popular Western perception of slavery as a shameful historic abomination, the slave trade is still big business, with an estimated 8.5 million children being exploited as commodities globally. Rageh Omaar takes a remarkable journey across three continents to expose the truth about contemporary slavery and discover why it is still in existence.

== Awards and nominations ==
Year	Awards show	Host country	Nomination(s)	Categories	Results
2004	RTS Television Journalism Awards	United Kingdom	Access to Evil	Current Affairs – International	Won
2005	65th Annual Peabody Awards	United States	Bad Medicine	N/A	Won
2005	RTS Television Journalism Awards	United Kingdom	The Hurricane That Shook America	Current Affairs – International	Nominated
2006	RTS Television Journalism Awards	United Kingdom	Killer's Paradise	Current Affairs – International	Nominated
2007	International Emmy Awards	United States	Baghdad: A Doctor's Story	Current Affairs	Won
2007	One World Media Awards (Note: Won as twice on TV Documentary awards in 2007 One World Media Awards for The Tea Boy of Gaza and The 12 Year Old Cocaine Smuggler)	United Kingdom	The Tea Boy of Gaza (Raw productions for This World, Director Olly Lambert)	TV documentary	Won
2007	One World Media Awards	United Kingdom	The 12 Year Old Cocaine Smuggler (Director Benito Montorio)	TV documentary	Won
2009	RTS Television Journalism Awards	United Kingdom	Gypsy Child Thieves	Current Affairs – International	Won
2011	RTS Television Journalism Awards	United Kingdom	The Wounded Platoon	Current Affairs – International	Won
2012	RTS Television Journalism Awards	United Kingdom	Spain's Stolen Babies	Current Affairs – International	Nominated
2012	One World Media Awards	United Kingdom	The Invasion of Lampedusa	Documentary	Nominated
2013	RTS Television Journalism Awards	United Kingdom	Inside the Meltdown	Current Affairs – International	Won
2013	Celtic Media Festival	United Kingdom	The Shame of the Catholic Church	Current Affairs	Won
2013	British Academy Television Awards	United Kingdom	The Shame of the Catholic Church	Current Affairs	Won
2015	RTS Television Journalism Awards	United Kingdom	Terror at the Mall	Current Affairs – International	Nominated
2015	RTS Programme Awards	United Kingdom	Terror at the Mall	Single Documentary	Nominated
2015	British Academy Television Awards	United Kingdom	Terror at the Mall	Current Affairs	Nominated
2015	One World Media Awards	United Kingdom	Clothes to Die For	Popular Features	Nominated
2016	RTS Television Journalism Awards	United Kingdom	Outbreak: The Truth About Ebola	Current Affairs - International	Nominated
2016	British Academy Television Awards	United Kingdom	Outbreak: The Truth About Ebola	Current Affairs	Won

== See also ==
- Panorama
- Our World
- Holidays in the Danger Zone
- Correspondent
