= 2010 in British television =

This is a list of events that took place in 2010 related to British television.

== Events ==
=== January ===
Date	Event
1 January	David Tennant makes his final regular appearance as the Tenth Doctor in the second part of the Doctor Who festive special "The End of Time", the final episode to be written by Russell T Davies, until 2023. The episode also sees the debut of the Eleventh Doctor played by Matt Smith and was watched by 10.4 million viewers.
3 January	Celebrity Big Brother returns for its final series on Channel 4.
5 January	Filming of Coronation Street and Emmerdale are halted because of heavy snowfall.
7 January	Jonathan Ross announces he will leave the BBC when his contract expires in July.
20 January	ITV broadcasts the postponed 2009 National Television Awards. The venue was also switched from the Royal Albert Hall to The O2 Arena and was watched by 7.4 million viewers – a 30% share of the audience.
21 January	The rapper and former Celebrity Big Brother contestant Lady Sovereign is scheduled to appear on BBC One's political magazine programme, This Week to discuss the laws regarding self-defence for householders. She is shown backstage early in the show, waving to camera in anticipation of her appearance, but has disappeared by the time the segment begins. Presenter Andrew Neil apologises to viewers, explaining she has "done a runner" and instead discussed the topic with regular contributors Michael Portillo and Diane Abbott. In a subsequent interview with The Guardian's Rich Pelley, the rapper says she had a panic attack. "My hands went stiff and I started hyperventilating. I didn't want to do it hours before but I went anyway, then I just changed my mind at the last minute, I guess."
21 January	CBeebies aired the last re-run of series 3 & 4 of Balamory, due to rights issues. Re-runs of the first 2 series continued until 2016.
24 January	The 1960s-set Only Fools and Horses prequel and miniseries Rock & Chips makes its debut on BBC One. The prequel features a teenage version of Del Boy, portrayed by The Inbetweeners actor James Buckley.
25 January	Long running children's television series and giant children's favourite Thomas and Friends is back on Channel 5 with a brand new series brought to life with fully CGI animation by Vancouver-based animation studio Nitrogen Studios.
28 January	Royal Mail boss Adam Crozier is appointed as ITV plc's new chief executive.
29 January	While giving evidence to the Iraq Inquiry, former Prime Minister Tony Blair addresses the interview he gave to Fern Britton in December, telling the hearing it was a mistake to say he would have got rid of Saddam Hussein regardless of whether or not the Iraqi leader had weapons of mass destruction. The inquiry is also told the interview had been recorded in July 2009, some months before the hearing was convened.
29 January	Cage fighter Alex Reid wins the seventh series of Celebrity Big Brother, the final one to air on Channel 4.
31 January	BSkyB becomes the first broadcaster in the world to show a live sports event in 3D when Sky Sports screens a football match between Manchester United and Arsenal to a public audience in several selected pubs.
January	Coverage of proceedings from the National Assembly for Wales are moved from S4C2 to the new BBC Democracy Live website.

=== February ===
Date	Event
5 February	Channel 5 airs Episode 5000 of Home and Away.
9 February	Supernanny presenter Jo Frost returns to Channel 4 with a new series, Jo Frost Extreme Parental Guidance.
9 February	Soap bosses confirm that Shane Richie and Jessie Wallace will reprise their roles as Alfie and Kat Moon in EastEnders, having last been seen on screen together in 2005.
10 February – 10 March	Analogue is switched off in the Blaenplwyf area
10 February	Channel 4's deal with Warner Brothers International Television to show episodes of Friends on Channel 4 and E4 will end from Autumn 2011 meaning the series will disappear from the network's schedules.
12 February	The events of the 2010 Winter Olympics start broadcasting worldwide.
13 February	Charlie Bruce wins series one of So You Think You Can Dance.
15 February	Fiona Armstrong and Julia Somerville join the BBC News Channel as regular presenters. They will be joined by Zeinab Badawi and Carole Walker as the BBC seeks to fight accusations that it has an ageist policy.
15 February	On an edition of the BBC's regional Inside Out programme, broadcaster Ray Gosling claims to have killed a former lover who had AIDS. He is arrested on suspicion of murder by Nottinghamshire Police two days later. The confession is later deemed to have been false. Gosling is charged with wasting police time, and given a 90-day suspended sentence at Nottingham Magistrates Court on 14 September.
19 February	BBC One soap EastEnders celebrates its 25th anniversary with a live episode. The episode, watched by 16.6 million viewers sees the culmination of the storyline concerning who killed the character Archie Mitchell (played by Larry Lamb), revealing that the deed was done by Stacey Slater (Lacey Turner).
24 February	News at Ten presenter Julie Etchingham is named as Presenter of the Year at the Royal Television Society Awards, the first woman to win the accolade.
28 February	The events of the 2010 Winter Olympics end broadcasting worldwide.

=== March ===
Date	Event
3 March	ITV announces a pre-tax profit of £25m for 2009, compared with a loss of £2.7bn in 2008.
3–31 March	Analogue is switched off in the Wenvoe area.
4 March	Penny Smith announces she is to leave GMTV after 17 years to pursue other projects.
4 March	Carol Vorderman appears as a panellist on BBC One's Question Time. Her performance is subsequently described by the New Statesman's James Macintyre as "one of the worst by any panel member I have ever seen" because of her "clichéd, shrill, pub-boring, parochial approach" and because "she trotted out sluggish conventional wisdom at every turn".
13 March	ITV announces that This Morning will air seven days a week, with two new one-hour shows being broadcast on Saturdays and Sundays from Saturday 20 March. Phillip Schofield and Holly Willoughby will present the extra shows.
18 March	A debate on The Alan Titchmarsh Show in which the actress Julie Peasgood emphasises the negative effects of violent video games attracts criticism due to her contribution to the 2000 release Martian Gothic: Unification, and because her arguments were based on a single unfavourable report on the subject.
24 March – 7 April	Analogue is switched off in the Mendip area.
26 March	Primary school programming is shown during the day on BBC Two for the final time. From next term, primary schools broadcasts become part of the overnight BBC Learning Zone with series shown as a back-to-back set rather than over several weeks.
26 March	Doctors celebrates its 10th anniversary.
26 March	Due to a drop in ratings, ITV announced its intention to cancel its long running police drama The Bill from autumn 2010, saying that the decision was made as it reflects the "changing tastes" of viewers.
26 March	Channel 4 quiz show Countdown celebrates its 5000th edition with a letter of congratulations from The Queen.
28 March	Gray O'Brien begins filming new scenes as Coronation Street villain Tony Gordon, who will break out of prison brandishing a gun after faking a heart attack.
28 March	Actress Hayley Tamaddon and skating partner Daniel Whiston win the fifth series of Dancing on Ice.
29 March	Claudia Winkleman is confirmed as Jonathan Ross's replacement as host of Film 2010 when Ross leaves the show later in the year.
29 March	The financial debate, the first of the 2010 election debates between Chancellor Alistair Darling, shadow Chancellor George Osborne and Liberal Democrat financial affairs spokesman Vince Cable is held on Channel 4.
31 March	The last analogue television services are switched off in Wales, making it the first part of the UK to have a fully digital service.
31 March	S4C begins broadcasting solely in Welsh.
31 March	BSkyB is told by the broadcasting regulator Ofcom that it must cut the price it charges rival cable, terrestrial and internet broadcasters to show its premium sports channels. Sky says that it will appeal against the ruling.

=== April ===
Date	Event
2 April	ITV1 HD is launched as a full-time service, offering a high definition simulcast of ITV1, with some programmes aired in upscaled HD until they are able to be filmed in full HD. On the same day, the ITV1 logo is slightly refreshed with the addition of a gradient effect and four new idents are introduced with a different soundtrack compared to the existing set of idents, which are retained but also updated to feature the refreshed ITV1 logo.
3 April	Doctor Who begins a new season (technically its 31st) with new leading actor Matt Smith. The first episode is watched by 8.4 million viewers.
5 April	Emmanuel College, Cambridge wins the 2009–10 series of University Challenge, beating St John's College, Oxford 315–100.
7 April	Dhruv Baker wins the 2010 series of MasterChef.
9 April	Long-running Coronation Street actor Bill Tarmey quits the soap after 31 years playing Jack Duckworth.
10 April	ITV airs the British terrestrial television premiere of Harry Potter and the Order of the Phoenix; the film is watched by 5.726 million viewers (25.7% of the audience share).
11 April	Coronation Street begins airing its first lesbian storyline, involving Sophie Webster (Brooke Vincent) and Sian Powers (Sacha Parkinson).
13 April	BBC One airs the 500th episode of its hospital drama Holby City.
15 April	ITV airs the first of three election debates between Gordon Brown, David Cameron and Nick Clegg ahead of the 2010 General Election.
19 April	Adrian Chiles quits the BBC to join ITV and GMTV in a new four-year deal.
19 April	Five launches a contest to find an aspiring British actress to appear in Neighbours to celebrate the soap's 25th anniversary.
21 April	Ben Shephard announces he is to quit GMTV after five years.
21 April	ITV newsreader Katie Derham is to join the BBC. She will be given an arts brief, including fronting the coverage of the Proms for BBC Two and BBC Radio 3.
22 April	The second election debate is aired by Sky News, and is viewed by an audience of 3.355 million, giving the channel its largest ever peak time audience. The debate is also shown on Sky Three and the BBC News Channel, and collectively attracts a viewership of 4.1 million.
29 April	BBC News hosts the final leaders debate before the election.
29 April	Rachel Leskovac, who plays hairdresser Natasha Blakeman in Coronation Street is to leave the soap.
30 April	Adrian Chiles presents his final edition of The One Show.

=== May ===
Date	Event
4 May	The premiere episode of Luther was aired on the BBC.
5–19 May	Analogue is switched off in the Bressay area.
6–12 May	Coverage of the 2010 general election is shown on all major television networks. There is also extensive coverage of the aftermath as the election results in a hung parliament and the Liberal Democrats seek to broker a deal with both the Conservatives and Labour to form a coalition government. David Cameron becomes Prime Minister on 11 May.
12–26 May	Analogue is switched off in the Keelylang area.
12 May	Jeremy Hunt is appointed as Culture Secretary by David Cameron.
12 May	Steve Rider quits as ITV Sport anchor after five years after his World Cup presenting role is given to Adrian Chiles.
12 May	Junior Apprentice makes its debut on BBC One. The first episode sees Karren Brady succeed Margaret Mountford as a member of Lord Sugar's board room.
21 May	Final ever episode of the BBC drama Ashes To Ashes.
24 May	Channel 4 premieres a live telecast game show The Million Pound Drop which became an international game show franchise shortly after the broadcast. The series (that would rename to The £100K Drop in 2018) would continue to run until its finale episode on 23 August 2019.
28 May	Georgia Bradford wins the 2010 series of Junior MasterChef.
29 May	Germany's Lena Meyer-Landrut wins the 2010 Eurovision Song Contest with "Satellite" whilst the last place finish went to the United Kingdom's "That Sounds Good to Me" by Josh Dubovie having had scored (dix points) ten points.
31 May	Coronation Street unveils a new opening title sequence and updated theme tune ahead of its fiftieth anniversary celebrations later in the year. The soap also begins transmitting in full high definition from this date onwards.

=== June ===
Date	Event
2 June	Television schedules are changed in the wake of the Cumbria shootings. BBC One alters their programming to broadcast two news specials about the shootings, at 14:15 (replacing a repeat of Murder, She Wrote) and 19:30 (taking over the time slot from the investigation programme Jimmy's Food Factory) on the same day. The scheduled 21:00 episode of ITV's Coronation Street is cancelled as it contained a violent storyline featuring a gun siege. Episodes for 3 and 4 June were also cancelled and rescheduled to air the following week. An episode of the Channel 4 panel game You Have Been Watching, which was due to be broadcast on 3 June, was postponed because it is a crime special.
2 June	The BBC have announced that long running comedy Last of the Summer Wine is to be axed after 37 years.
2 June	ITN has announced that Nina Hossain is to replace Katie Derham as a new co-host on London Tonight.
2–16 June	Analogue is switched off in the Rumster forest area.
4 June	Penny Smith presents her final programme on GMTV after 17 years.
4 June	BSkyB announces that it has finalised the terms of a deal to buy Virgin Media Television for £160 million.
5 June	Gymnastics troupe Spelbound win the fourth series of Britain's Got Talent.
9 June	Big Brother returns to Channel 4 for its final series.
10 June	Mathematics student Arjun Rajyagor wins the first series of Junior Apprentice and a £25,000 investment from Lord Sugar to kick start his business career.
11 June	The 2010 FIFA World Cup begins with BBC and ITV showing live coverage.
11 June	GMTV announces plans to rebrand itself in September, dropping the GMTV name after 17 years in a £1.5million overhaul. On the same day presenter Andrew Castle announces his intention to leave the station after 10 years on air.
12 June	ITV1 HD's coverage of England's opening match at the 2010 FIFA World Cup against the USA is affected by a technical error resulting in viewers missing the opening goal of the match scored by England captain Steven Gerrard. The standard definition feed is not affected by the error.
12 June	The first edition of James Corden's World Cup Live is broadcast on ITV1, a comedy programme that will be shown after every evening match from the 2010 FIFA World Cup that is broadcast live by ITV1.
15 June	Robbie Earle is dismissed from his punditry role with ITV with immediate effect after it emerges that tickets allocated to his family and friends had been passed on to a third party as part of an organised marketing ambush scheme by the Dutch beer brand Bavaria.
20 June	ITV has announced that Christine Bleakley is to join GMTV to reunite with Adrian Chiles after signing a three-year contract with the broadcaster.
20 June	Thousands of hours of programming from STV's archives will be made available online from later in the year after the Scottish broadcaster signed a deal with YouTube, the Daily Record reports.
23 June	Following the previous day's emergency budget statement, David Cameron and Nick Clegg are questioned by a live audience on its potential impact. The programme Britain's Economy: Cameron and Clegg Face the Audience is presented by Nick Robinson and aired on the BBC News Channel and BBC Two.
25 June	ITV is to suspend production of Heartbeat to catch up on a backlog of unbroadcast episodes, it is reported.
27 June	ITV experiences its lowest viewing figures in its history. Less than one in ten people watched the channel and no more than 4 million people watched a single programme. On the day, the BBC broadcast the 2010 FIFA World Cup last-16 match between England and Germany (with 17.8 million viewers). Lack of viewers was also blamed on good summer weather.

=== July ===
Date	Event
1 July	It is announced that Emma Crosby will leave GMTV after only a year.
7–21 July	Analogue is switched off in the Eitshal area.
9 July	ITV announces the name of its new breakfast television service that will replace GMTV. Daybreak will launch in September.
11 July	BBC One and ITV1 broadcast live coverage of the 2010 FIFA World Cup Final from Soccer City in Johannesburg.
13 July	BSkyB completes its deal to buy Virgin Media Television after receiving regulatory approval in the Republic of Ireland. Sky will rename its new acquisition Living TV Group.
14–28 July	Analogue is switched off in the Skriaig area.
16 July	Essex teenager Gabriella Darlington wins Five's Be a Star on Neighbours competition, and will make a four-week appearance in the show as Poppy Rogers. She will be seen on UK screens from 10 November.
19 July	S4C begins broadcasting in high definition when it launches a channel called 'Clirlun'.
20 July	The Teletext games magazine GameCentral is to move to the Metro website following an online petition by fans to keep it running.
23 July	Media tycoon Richard Desmond buys Five from RTL for £104m.
25 July	BBC One broadcasts the first episode of Sherlock, a modern-day adaptation of Sherlock Holmes, written by Doctor Who showrunner Steven Moffat and starring Benedict Cumberbatch as Holmes and Martin Freeman as Dr. John Watson. The episode is watched by a total of 7.5 million viewers.
30 July	Ben Shephard presents his final programme on GMTV after 11 years.

=== August ===
Date	Event
4–18 August	Analogue is switched off in the Angus area.
9 August	Viewers in Scotland complain to the BBC after hearing newsreader Kate Silverton swear at the end of a bulletin. The presenter had not realised the mic was still on when she uttered the expletive, which is only picked up by BBC One Scotland. The BBC later apologises for the incident.
14–22 August	The events of the 2010 IBSA World Blind Football Championship are aired.
20 August	Lisa Faulkner wins the 2010 series of Celebrity MasterChef.
23 August	Sky Sports News is removed from the Freeview platform after Sky decided to make it a subscription only channel.
24 August	Josie Gibson wins Channel 4's final regular series of Big Brother and Ultimate Big Brother launched immediately after becoming the final ever series of Big Brother to air on Channel 4.
24 August	Ahead of the final-ever episode of The Bill, ITV airs a two-part finale of the long-running police drama titled Respect.
29 August	After 37 years, the long-running sitcom Last of the Summer Wine is aired on BBC One for the last time.
31 August	After 26 years, the long-running police drama The Bill is aired on ITV for the last time, concluding with the second part of the series finale, Respect.

=== September ===
Date	Event
1–15 September	Analogue is switched off in the Durris area.
3 September	GMTV airs its last edition after 17 years on air.
3 September	Virgin1 is rebranded as Channel One.
6 September	New ITV breakfast show Daybreak begins with former The One Show hosts Adrian Chiles and Christine Bleakley presenting. The inaugural edition features an interview with former Prime Minister Tony Blair, while overnight viewing figures published the following day indicate the programme had an audience of over a million.
8–22 September	Analogue is switched off in the Knockmore area.
9 September	Five airs a special evening edition of its morning news themed programme The Wright Stuff to celebrate its tenth anniversary.
10 September	Barbara Windsor makes her final regular appearance as EastEnders' Peggy Mitchell, exiting in a dramatic storyline that sees The Queen Vic destroyed by fire.
10 September	Brian Dowling becomes Big Brother's Ultimate Housemate after winning Ultimate Big Brother which is the last ever series of the reality television show to air on Channel 4 before returning on 18 August 2011 this time on Channel 5.
12 September	Heartbeat airs its last ever episode after 18 years with the episode watched by 6.00 million viewers.
14 September	Jay Hunt announces she is leaving the post of Controller of BBC One to take up the role of chief creative officer at Channel 4.
15 September	BSkyB announces that it is to close down Bravo (and also Bravo 2) on 1 January 2011 and Channel One (formerly Virgin 1) on 1 February 2011 to focus on the Living brand as well as their own channels such as Sky1, Sky2 and Sky3. The gameshow channel Challenge is to take over Channel One's slot on Freeview, which will boost ratings for Challenge.
16 September	BBC One airs a special edition of Question Time featuring David Miliband, Ed Miliband, Ed Balls, Andy Burnham and Diane Abbott—the five candidates in the forthcoming Labour Party leadership election.
16 September	The Welsh language channel S4C2 is removed from Sky channel 507.
17 September	Jessie Wallace returns to EastEnders after five years.
21 September	Edd Kimber wins the first series of The Great British Bake Off.
26 September	ITV period drama Downton Abbey makes its debut for the first time.
28 September	ITV confirms that the noted 1950s red landmark "Granada TV" sign on the roof and entrance of Granada Studios on Quay Street, Manchester, has been removed for safety reasons after maintenance found it was badly corroded.

=== October ===
Date	Event
1 October	The very first 3D channel in the UK, Sky 3D launches.
4 October	Tiffany Pisani wins Cycle 6 of Britain's Next Top Model.
6 October	The Apprentice returns to BBC One for a sixth series, having been delayed from earlier in the year because of the general election, and concerns Lord Sugar's role as a government adviser could present a conflict of interest if the series was on air in the run up to polling day.
6–20 October	Analogue is switched off in the Rosemarkie area.
8 October	During a review of the following day's newspapers, Sky News presenter Steve Dixon is forced to make a hasty apology after asking Bee Gee Robin Gibb if his brother, Maurice (who died in 2003) is watching while discussing an article that makes reference to the late singer.
11–25 October	BBC Four show the first episode of Mark Gatiss' A History of Horror documentary. Each of the three episodes looks at the influence of the genre and features interviews with the likes of John Carpenter, George A. Romero and Roger Corman.
13–27 October	Analogue is switched off in the Torosay area.
14 October	Five confirms that Natasha Kaplinsky will leave the broadcaster at the end of the year.
15 October	BBC Three Controller Danny Cohen is named as the new Controller of BBC One, replacing Jay Hunt.
15 October	Five airs Episode 6000 of Neighbours.
20 October	ITV confirms that Beverley Callard will leave her Coronation Street role as Rovers Return landlady Liz McDonald in 2011, after 22 years with the soap.
20 October	The Chancellor of the Exchequer, George Osborne, announces that part of the responsibility for funding S4C is to be transferred to the BBC.
23 October	Channel 4 teen soap Hollyoaks celebrates its 15th anniversary.
28 October	Release of A Simples Life, the autobiography of the real-life meerkat Aleksandr Orlov, star of the Compare the Meerkat television adverts that first appeared on screen in January 2009. The commercials have proved popular with viewers, and have seen pre-order sales of the book on Amazon.co.uk out-perform those of autobiographies by people such as Tony Blair, Cheryl Cole and Dannii Minogue.
October	UKTV launches its second HD channel – for Eden.
October	In Wales, S4C2 is removed from Virgin Media channel 168.

=== November ===
Date	Event
2 November	Claire Lara wins the third series of MasterChef: The Professionals.
4 November	Business Secretary Vince Cable orders Ofcom to investigate News Corporation's plan to take full control of BSkyB.
5 November	Members of the National Union of Journalists at the BBC begin a 48-hour strike in a dispute over proposed changes to the corporation's pension scheme. BBC News operates a reduced service.
5 November	The BBC announces that Ready Steady Cook will not return for another series.
8 November	Bill Tarmey makes his final appearance on Coronation Street, dying in his armchair of incurable cancer. Elizabeth Dawn returns for a one-off appearance as the ghost of Jack's late wife Vera.
17 November	Analogue is switched off in the Channel Islands.
19 November	Cast members of EastEnders and Coronation Street take part in a crossover episode titled East Street for Children in Need.
26 November	Ofcom revokes the broadcast licenses of the four Tease Me television sex line channels for broadcasting sexually explicit content before the watershed.
30 November	In Wales, S4C2 is removed from Freeview channel 86.

=== December ===
Date	Event
4 December	Singer Stacey Solomon wins the tenth series of I'm a Celebrity...Get Me Out of Here!.
6 December	S4C2 ceases broadcasting when it is removed from the Freesat platform.
6–10 December	ITV1 soap Coronation Street celebrates its 50th anniversary with a week of special episodes, centering around a tram derailing and crashing into the street. This includes the broadcast of an hour long live episode on the date of the anniversary itself (9 December). Additional special programmes during the week include a repeat of the very first episode from 1960, a countdown of the soap's 50 most memorable moments as voted for by the public and a quiz show special hosted by Paul O'Grady.
12 December	Matt Cardle wins the seventh series of The X Factor.
13 December	BBC journalist Ben Brown conducts an interview for the BBC News Channel with Jody McIntyre, a political activist with cerebral palsy who had been dragged from his wheelchair by Metropolitan police officers during a recent student protest march through London. Brown is subsequently criticised by viewers for adopting a "highly accusatory" tone during the interview.
18 December	Actress Kara Tointon and dancing partner Artem Chigvintsev win the eighth series of Strictly Come Dancing.
19 December	Stella English wins the sixth series of The Apprentice.
19 December	Jockey Tony McCoy is named as this year's BBC Sports Personality of the Year.
20 December	BBC News journalist Brian Hanrahan, best known for reporting the Falklands War, dies of bowel cancer aged 61.
21 December	The European Commission approves News Corporation's bid to take full control of British satellite broadcaster BSkyB. However, the deal will be reviewed by Ofcom before a final decision is made.
21 December	Responsibility for media and broadcasting policy is transferred from Business Secretary Vince Cable's Department to that of Culture Secretary Jeremy Hunt after Cable was secretly recorded by Daily Telegraph journalists saying that he had "declared war" on Rupert Murdoch over News Corporation's plans to take full control of BSkyB.
26 December	Upstairs, Downstairs returns after 35 years of absence moving from ITV to BBC One.

== Debuts ==
=== BBC ===
Date	Debut	Channel
2 January	So You Think You Can Dance	BBC One
4 January	Great British Railway Journeys	BBC Two
8 January	Tracy Beaker Returns	CBBC
8 January	EastEnders: E20	BBC Online
9 January	Driver Dan's Story Train	CBeebies
13 January	The Persuasionists	BBC Two
14 January	Material Girl	BBC One
18 January	Late Kick Off	BBC One
21 January	Bellamy's People	BBC Two
22 January	The Review Show	BBC Two
22 January	Spirit Warriors	CBBC
24 January	Rock & Chips	BBC One
24 January	The Great Rift: Africa's Wild Heart	BBC Two
25 January	Alphablocks	CBeebies
30 January	The Virtual Revolution	BBC Two
31 January	The Seven Ages of Britain	BBC One
4 February	Hotter Than My Daughter	BBC Three
19 February	The Bubble	BBC Two
21 February	Banded Brothers	BBC Two
23 February	On Expenses	BBC Four
1 March	This is Jinsy	BBC Three
7 March	Wonders of the Solar System	BBC Four
9 March	The Gemma Factor	BBC Three
14 March	Tropic of Cancer	BBC Two
15 March	Big Babies	CBBC
18 March	Museum of Life	BBC Two
26 March	Over the Rainbow	BBC One
31 March	Canoe Man	BBC Four
5 April	ZingZillas	CBeebies
6 April	Great Ormond Street	BBC Two
18 April	America's Medicated Kids	BBC Two
16 April	Frank Skinner's Opinionated	BBC Two
25 April	Five Daughters	BBC One
26 April	Ceres with Russell & Kerrie	BBC One
1 May	I'm in a Rock 'n' Roll Band!	BBC Two
3 May	Everything's Rosie	CBeebies
4 May	Boats that Built Britain	BBC Four
4 May	Luther	BBC One
10 May	High Street Dreams	BBC One
12 May	Junior Apprentice	BBC One
17 May	Royal Wedding	BBC Two
23 May	Money	BBC Two
31 May	The Secret Diaries of Miss Anne Lister	BBC Two
3 June	Pulse	BBC Three
10 June	Lee Nelson's Well Good Show	BBC Three
10 June	Stanley Park	BBC Three
11 June	Hounded	CBBC
22 June	Mongrels	BBC Three
23 June	Lennon Naked	BBC Four
28 June	Rev.	BBC Two
30 June	Reunited	BBC One
30 June	The Bionic Vet	BBC One
10 July	101 Ways to Leave a Gameshow	BBC One
11 July	Sunday Morning Live	BBC One
15 July	Victorian Pharmacy	BBC Two
24 July	John Bishop's Britain	BBC One
25 July	Sherlock	BBC One
28 July	The Great Outdoors	BBC Four
3 August	The Deep	BBC One
6 August	Roger & Val Have Just Got In	BBC Two
9 August	Grandma's House	BBC Two
12 August	The Jungle Book	CBBC
15 August	Secret Britain	BBC One
15 August	Vexed	BBC Two
22 August	Mountain Gorilla	BBC Two
24 August	Dive	BBC Two
2 September	The King Is Dead	BBC Three
6 September	Him & Her	BBC Three
6 September	Climbing Great Buildings	BBC Two
12 September	A Concert for Heroes	BBC One
14 September	First Light	BBC Two
16 September	The Road to Coronation Street	BBC Four
17 September	The Rob Brydon Show	BBC Two
18 September	The Special Relationship	BBC Two
27 September	Ask Rhod Gilbert	BBC One
28 September	Whites	BBC Two
4 October	Octonauts	CBeebies
9 October	The Song of Lunch	BBC Four
10 October	Law and Disorder in Lagos	BBC Two
12 October	Lip Service	BBC Three
1 November	The Trip	BBC Two
3 November	Wallace and Gromit's World of Invention	BBC One
15 November	Accused	BBC One
15 November	The Indian Doctor	BBC One
25 December	Come Fly with Me	BBC One
26 December	Upstairs Downstairs	BBC One

=== ITV ===
Date	Debut	Channel
2 January	Take Me Out	ITV
15 January	Popstar to Operastar	ITV
1 February	FHM's Stand-Up Hero	ITV4
22 February	Married Single Other	ITV
27 February	Ant & Dec's Push The Button	ITV
5 March	STV Sports Centre	STV
26 March	Comedy Rocks	ITV
2 April	The Door	ITV
12 April	Joanna Lumley's Nile	ITV
16 April	Kitchen Burnout	ITV
17 April	The Prisoner	ITV
17 April	The Whole 19 Yards	ITV
22 April	The Nightshift	STV
7 June	Father & Son	ITV
12 June	James Corden's World Cup Live	ITV
5 July	Identity	ITV
17 July	Magic Numbers	ITV
17 July	Odd One In	ITV
2 August	3@Three	ITV
4 August	Style Queen	ITV2
16 August	The Michael Ball Show	ITV
24 August	Jedward: Let Loose	ITV2
6 September	Daybreak	ITV
6 September	Lorraine	ITV
6 September	Bouquet of Barbed Wire	ITV
10 September	Paul O'Grady Live	ITV
12 September	Albert's Memorial	ITV
22 September	Richard Bacon's Beer & Pizza Club	ITV4
26 September	Downton Abbey	ITV
27 September	DCI Banks	ITV
10 October	The Only Way Is Essex	ITV2
21 October	Mark Watson Kicks Off	ITV4
15 November	Party Wars	ITV
20 November	Simply Red: For the Last Time	ITV
20 December	Come Rain Come Shine	ITV

=== Channel 4 ===
Date	Debut	Channel
18 January	Gordon's Great Escape	Channel 4
25 January	The Good Wife	Channel 4
31 January	Mo	Channel 4
5 April	Channel 4's Comedy Gala	Channel 4
7 April	A Comedy Roast	Channel 4
10 April	100 Greatest Stand-Ups	Channel 4
16 April	Facejacker	Channel 4
19 April	Happy Finish	Channel 4
19 April	iCandy	Channel 4
21 April	Penelope Princess of Pets	Channel 4
22 April	Filth	Channel 4
23 April	Hung Out	Channel 4
23 April	MovieMash	Channel 4
23 April	The Ricky Gervais Show	Channel 4
24 May	The Million Pound Drop Live	Channel 4
31 May	The 5 O'Clock Show	Channel 4
21 June	Being... N-Dubz	4Music
25 June	Stand Up for the Week	Channel 4
6 August	Pete Versus Life	Channel 4
10 August	Help! My House is Falling Down	Channel 4
7 September	This Is England '86	Channel 4
26 September	Trinny & Susannah: What They Did Next	Channel 4
26 September	Miliband of Brothers	More4
7 October	PhoneShop	Channel 4
16 October	The Pillars of the Earth	Channel 4
1 November	Coppers	Channel 4
8 November	Celebrity Coach Trip	Channel 4
14 November	The Increasingly Poor Decisions of Todd Margaret	More4
21 November	Any Human Heart	Channel 4
30 November	Frankie Boyle's Tramadol Nights	Channel 4

=== Five ===
Date	Debut	Channel
11 January	Paul Merton in Europe	Five
9 February	Chinese Food in Minutes	Five
29 March	Justin Lee Collins: Good Times	Five
31 March	Heads or Tails	Five
18 July	Don't Stop Believing	Five
24 September	Eddie Stobart: Trucks & Trailers	Five
22 October	Warship	Five
25 December	Rosamunde Pilcher's Shades of Love	Five

=== Other channels ===
Date	Debut	Channel
3 January	Got to Dance	Sky 1
8 January	Bill Bailey's Birdwatching Bonanza	Sky 1
1 February	The Cleveland Show	E4
10 January	What Do Kids Know?	Watch
14 February	Pineapple Dance Studios	Sky 1
11 March	A League of Their Own	Sky 1
19 March	Comedy Exchange	Dave
26 March	Liza & Huey's Pet Nation	Sky 1 and Sky 1 HD
6 April	The Bopps	Nick Jr.
2 May	Scream! If You Know the Answer	Watch
5 May	Strike Back	Sky 1
30 May	Terry Pratchett's Going Postal	Sky 1
10 June	Football's Greatest	Sky Sports 1 & 2
23 July	Suck My Pop	Viva
15 August	Must Be The Music	Sky 1
29 August	The Middle	Sky 1
3 September	Comedy Central at the Comedy Store	Comedy Central
23 September	An Idiot Abroad	Sky 1
10 October	Dave's One Night Stand	Dave
4 November	Carpool	Dave

== Channels ==
=== New channels ===
Date	Channel
1 March	MTV Classic
25 March	Dance Nation TV
29 March	Lava
29 March	Imagine TV
2 April	ITV1 HD
22 April	Sky News HD
1 May	Jewellery Maker
6 June	STV HD
5 July	Living Loves
13 July	Five HD
6 August	Sky Movies Classics HD
9 August	Comedy Central HD
23 August	Sky Sports News HD
23 August	Sky3 +1
31 August	Good Food HD
1 September	Vintage TV
1 October	Sky 3D
4 October	Eden HD
5 October	Nickelodeon HD
5 October	UTV HD
7 October	ITV2 HD
1 November	Film GB
3 November	BBC One HD
15 November	ITV3 HD
15 November	ITV4 HD

=== Defunct channels ===
Date	Channel
1 March	Rockworld TV
1 March	VH1 Classic
10 March	Virgin Central
17 March	Flaunt
29 March	Rockworld TV
29 March	NDTV Imagine
31 March	S4C (analogue service)
1 April	Men & Motors
1 April	GOD Europe
21 April	Unexplained Channel
5 May	Thomas Cook TV
2 June	Rural TV
24 June	Sky Travel
30 June	Music Choice Europe
1 July	Living +2
6 August	Real Madrid TV
19 August	Sky Real Lives
19 August	Sky Real Lives +1
19 August	Sky Real Lives HD
19 August	Sky Real Lives 2
31 August	Teachers TV
1 September	oMusic TV
2 September	Original Black Entertainment TV
8 September	Edge Media Television
6 December	S4C2

=== Rebranded channels ===
Date	Old Name	New Name
6 January	Sky Sports Xtra	Sky Sports 4
1 March	MTV R	MTV Shows
1 March	MTV Two	MTV Rocks
13 April	Sci Fi Channel	Syfy
13 April	Sci Fi Channel +1	Syfy +1
13 April	Sci Fi Channel HD	Syfy HD
3 September	Virgin1	Channel One
3 September	Virgin1 +1	Channel One +1
15 October	Hallmark Channel	Universal Channel
15 October	Hallmark Channel +1	Universal Channel +1
15 October	Hallmark Channel HD	Universal Channel HD

== Television shows ==
=== Changes of network affiliation ===
Show	Moved from	Moved to
The Boat Race	ITV1	BBC One
Golden Balls	ITV1	Challenge
The British Comedy Awards	ITV1	Channel 4
Upstairs, Downstairs	ITV1	BBC One
PhoneShop	Channel 4	E4
Robot Wars (repeats)	Bravo	Dave
Top of the Pops 2	Dave	Yesterday
South Park (on Freeview)	Channel 4	Viva
Pinky and the Brain	CBBC	Kix

=== Returning this year after a break of one year or longer ===
Programme	Date of original removal	Original channel	Date of return	New channel(s)
Thomas & Friends	26 September 2008	Channel 5	25 January 2010	N/A (Same channel as original)
Jo Frost Extreme Parental Guidance	8 October 2008	Channel 4	9 February 2010	N/A (Same channel as original)
Children's Hospital	26 February 2003	BBC One	23 March 2010	ITV
Upstairs, Downstairs	21 December 1975	ITV	26 December 2010	BBC One

== Continuing television shows ==
=== 1920s ===
Programme	Date
BBC Wimbledon	1927–1939, 1945–2019, 2021–present

=== 1930s ===
Programme	Date
Trooping the Colour	1937–1939, 1945–2019, 2023–present
The Boat Race	1938–1939, 1945–2019, 2021–present

=== 1950s ===
Programme	Date
Panorama	1953–present
Eurovision Song Contest	1956–present
The Sky at Night	1957–present
Blue Peter	1958–present

=== 1960s ===
Programme	Date
Coronation Street	1960–present
Points of View	1961–present
Songs of Praise	1961–present
University Challenge	1962–1987, 1994–present
Doctor Who	1963–1989, 1996, 2005–present
Match of the Day
The Money Programme	1966–2010

=== 1970s ===
Programme	Date
Question of Sport	1970–present
Emmerdale	1972–present
Mastermind	1972–present
Newsround	1972–present
Last of the Summer Wine	1973–2010
Arena	1975–present
One Man and His Dog	1976–present
The Krypton Factor	1977–1995, 2009–2010
Top Gear	1977–present
Ski Sunday	1978–present
Antiques Roadshow	1979–present
Question Time	1979–present

=== 1980s ===
Programme	Date
Children in Need	1980–present
Timewatch	1982–present
The Bill	1984–2010
Channel 4 Racing	1984–2016
Thomas & Friends	1984–present
EastEnders	1985–present
Comic Relief	1985–present
Casualty	1986–present
Fireman Sam	1987–1994, 2005–2013
This Morning	1988–present
The Simpsons	1989–present

=== 1990s ===
Programme	Date
Have I Got News for You	1990–present
Heartbeat	1992–2010
A Touch of Frost	1992–2010
Shooting Stars	1993–2002, 2009–2011
Time Team	1994–2013
The National Lottery Draws	1994–2017
Top of the Pops 2	1994–2017
Hollyoaks	1995–present
Never Mind the Buzzcocks	1996–2015
Silent Witness	1996–present
Midsomer Murders	1997–present
Y Clwb Rygbi, Wales	1997–present
South Park	1997–present
Who Wants to Be a Millionaire?	1998–2014
Bob the Builder	1998–present
British Soap Awards	1999–2019, 2022–present
Family Guy	1999–2002, 2005–present
Futurama	1999–2003, 2008–2013
Bremner, Bird and Fortune	1999–2010
SpongeBob SquarePants	1999–present
Holby City	1999–2022

=== 2000s ===
Programme	Date
The Weakest Link	2000–2012, 2017–present
Big Brother	2000–present
Real Crime	2001–2011
I'm a Celebrity...Get Me Out of Here!	2002–present
Harry Hill's TV Burp	2002–2012
Spooks	2002–2011
River City	2002–2026
Daily Politics	2003–2018
New Tricks	2003–2015
QI	2003–present
Peep Show	2003–2015
Politics Show	2003–2011
The Royal	2003–2011
This Week	2003–2019
Doc Martin	2004–2022
Shameless	2004–2013
Strictly Come Dancing	2004–present
The X Factor	2004–2018
Coach Trip	2005–2006, 2009–2012, 2013–present
Come Dine with Me	2005–present
8 Out of 10 Cats	2005–present
It's Me or the Dog	2005–2012
Deal or No Deal	2005–2016
The Andrew Marr Show	2005–2021
Mock the Week	2005–2022
Dancing on Ice	2006–present
That Mitchell and Webb Look	2006–2010
Torchwood	2006–2011
Waterloo Road	2006–2015
Britain's Got Talent	2007–present
Gavin & Stacey	2007–2010, 2019
M.I.High	2007–2014
Outnumbered	2007–2014
Trapped	2007–present
The Sarah Jane Adventures	2007–2011
Skins	2007–2013
The Tudors	2007–2010
Would I Lie To You?	2007–present
Argumental	2008–2012
Ashes to Ashes	2008–2010
Mistresses	2008–2010
Only Connect	2008–present
The Inbetweeners	2008–2010
Merlin	2008–2012
Survivors	2008–2010
Wallander	2008–2016
Bang Goes the Theory	2009–2014
The Chase	2009–present
The Cube	2009–2015
The Impressions Show with Culshaw and Stephenson	2009–2011
Miranda	2009–2015
Missing	2009–2010
PhoneShop	2009–2013
Pointless	2009–present
Psychoville	2009–2011
Russell Howard's Good News	2009–2015
School of Comedy	2009–2010
Angelina Ballerina: The Next Steps	2009–2010
Rip Off Britain	2009–present

== Ending this year ==
Date	Programme	Channel	Debut(s)
1 January	Gavin & Stacey	BBC One	2007
29 January	Celebrity Big Brother	Channel 4	2001
12 February	Bill Bailey's Birdwatching Bonanza	Sky 1	2010
23 February	Survivors	BBC One	2008
11 March	Bellamy's People	BBC Two	2010
14 March	Banded Brothers	BBC Two	2010
26 March	Missing	BBC One	2009
29 March	Married Single Other	ITV	2010
3 April	The Door	ITV	2010
5 April	A Touch of Frost	ITV	1992
22 April	Museum of Life	BBC Two	2010
25 April	Tropic of Cancer	BBC Two	2010
27 April	Five Daughters	BBC One	2010
4 May	Chinese Food in Minutes	Five	2010
7 May	Divided	ITV	2009
21 May	Ashes to Ashes	BBC One	2008
26 May	Money	BBC Two	2010
30 May	The South Bank Show	ITV	1978
31 May	Terry Pratchett's Going Postal	Sky 1	2010
5 June	The Whole 19 Yards	ITV	2010
16 July	Friday Night with Jonathan Ross	BBC One	2001
23 July	The 5 O'Clock Show	Channel 4	2010
30 July	Working Lunch	BBC Two	1994
9 August	Identity	ITV	2010
13 August	3@Three	ITV	2010
22 August	Don't Stop Believing	Five	2010
26 August	Mistresses	BBC One	2008
28 August	Magic Numbers	ITV	2010
29 August	Last of the Summer Wine	BBC One	1973
31 August	The Deep	BBC One	2010
31 August	The Bill	ITV	1984
3 September	GMTV	ITV	1993
5 September	Mountain Gorilla	BBC Two	2010
7 September	Raven	CBBC	2002
10 September	Big Brother	Channel 4	2000
10 September	SkyNews.com	Sky News	2007
12 September	Heartbeat	ITV	1992
19 September	Must Be the Music	Sky 1	2010
24 September	The Michael Ball Show	ITV	2010
28 September	Climbing Great Buildings	BBC Two	2010
28 September	This Is England '86	Channel 4	2010
18 October	The Inbetweeners	E4	2008
18 October	School of Comedy	E4	2009
22 October	Suck My Pop	Viva	2010
2 November	Whites	BBC Two	2010
7 November	Taggart	ITV	1983
7 November	To Buy or Not to Buy	BBC One	2003
18 November	Reggie Perrin	BBC One	2009
8 December	Wallace and Gromit's World of Invention	BBC One	2010
17 December	The Restaurant	BBC Two	2007
17 December	Trisha Goddard	Five	2005

== Deaths ==
Date	Name	Age	Broadcast credibility
5 February	Ian Carmichael	89	Actor
15 February	George Waring	84	Actor
1 March	Kristian Digby	32	Television presenter and director
20 March	Harry Carpenter	84	Sports commentator
7 April	Christopher Cazenove	66	Actor
25 June	Alan Plater	75	Television playwright
1 July	Geoffrey Hutchings	71	Actor
13 July	Gilly Coman	54	Actress
6 August	John Louis Mansi	83	Actor (Heer von Smallhausen in 'Allo 'Allo!)
4 October	Norman Wisdom	95	Actor and comedian
11 October	Claire Rayner	79	Broadcaster and writer
14 October	Simon MacCorkindale	58	Actor, director and producer
26 November	Gavin Blyth	41	Emmerdale producer, Coronation Street story maker
20 December	Brian Hanrahan	61	Television journalist

== See also ==
- 2010 in British music
- 2010 in British radio
- 2010 in the United Kingdom
- List of British films of 2010
