= Peter Draper =

Peter Draper may refer to:

- Peter Draper (politician) (born 1958), Australian politician
- Peter Draper (architectural historian) (born 1943), British art and architecture historian
- Peter Raymond Draper (born 1957), British professor of nursing
