= Marriage bed of Henry VII =

15th-century four-post bedstead

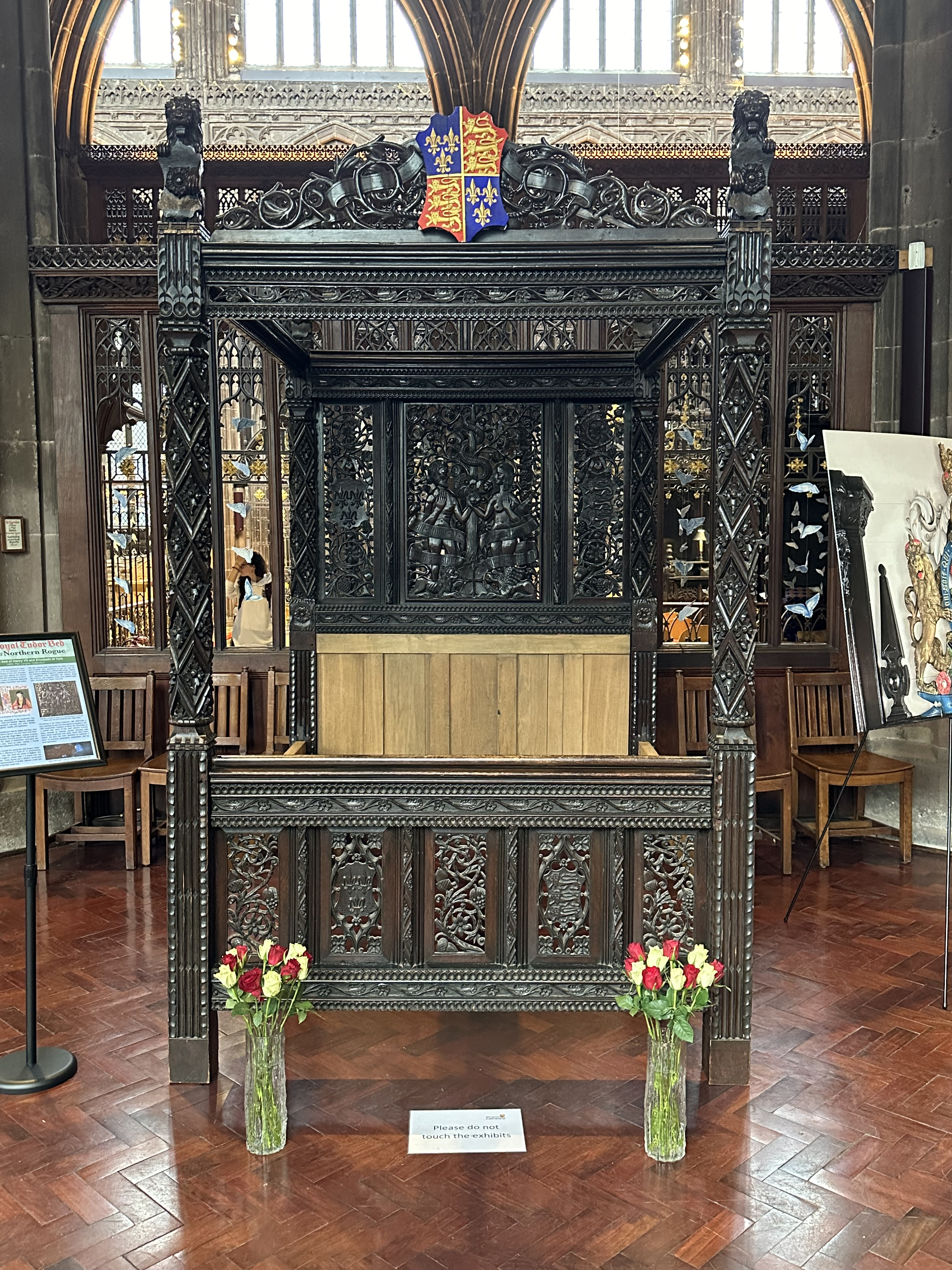
Henry VII and Elizabeth of York Bed on Display in Manchester Cathedral

The Marriage Bed of Henry VII and Elizabeth of York (also known as the Paradise Bed, Bed of Roses) is a carved oak four-post bedstead bought in a dilapidated condition at an auction in Chester, England, in 2010. Since then the bed has been subjected to art historical investigation and advanced material analysis, brought together in The Marriage Bed of Henry VII and Elizabeth of York: A Masterpiece of Tudor Craftsmanship (Oxford: 2023). It has alo been explored in numerous other works including Brooke's 'The Marriage Bed of Henry VII & Elizabeth of York: Dynasty, Design & Descent', Peregrinations: Journal of Medieval Art and Architecture 8, 3 (2022). It is suggested that the bed was made to celebrate the marriage of King Henry VII to Elizabeth of York on 18 January 1486 and placed in front of the Edward the Confessor Mural in The Painted Chamber at The Palace of Westminster, London.

== Description ==
The bed measures 9 feet (2.7 m) in height, 5 feet (1.5 m) in width and 6 feet (1.8 m) in length. It is a four-poster bed with each of the posts topped with a carved lion (one of which has lost his tail) each of which holds a shield emblazoned with a rose. The posts support a tester which depicts the tree of life growing from Christ's cross.

Royal arms of England quartered with those of France

The frontispiece of the tester shows the arms of England and France quartered. The sides of the tester are formed in the shape of a knotted cord which may reflect Henry's links with the Order of Friars Minor (the Observant Friars). In the centre part of each side holds a shield showing the Cross of Saint George, a particular favourite of Henry's.

The headboard is in the form of a triptych with a central panel showing Henry and Elizabeth flanked by the arms of England and the arms of France, that was originally picked out in expensive ultramarine paint.

The carving has been interpreted as an allegory of Adam and Eve and also of Christ and the Virgin Mary working to undo the sins of Adam and Eve and working to turn England into a paradise on Earth. The Royal couple are depicted overcoming the young lion, dragon and snake defeated by Christ in Psalm 91. Due to the connection to the story of Adam and Eve the bed is sometimes referred to as the "Paradise Bed". The inclusion of the arms of France reflect Henry's possessions on the continent and his future ambitions there.

The arms are repeated on the footboard. Other carvings include fertility symbols such as acorns, grapes and strawberries and symbols of the Tudor royalty such as stars, shields, lions and roses. These are similar to carvings in the Henry VII Chapel at Westminster Abbey, dating to 1503–1516. The rose carvings on the bed are a mixture of the Red Rose of Lancaster and the White Rose of York which dates it to the early period of Henry's monarchy, before the adoption of the combined Tudor rose.

== History ==
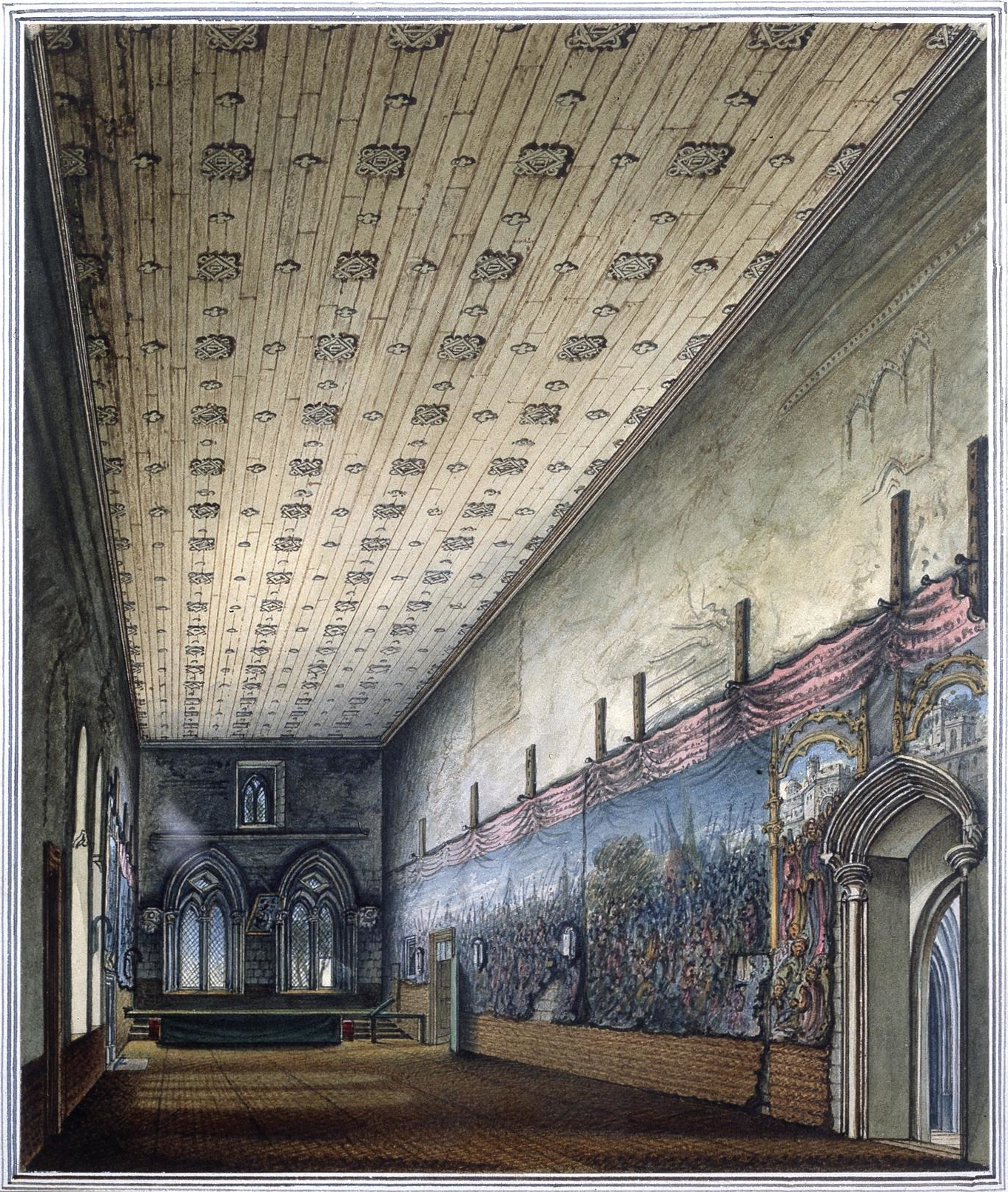
The painted chamber (depicted in 1799) originally housed the bed.

The bed is believed to have been made for the wedding of Henry VII and Elizabeth of York, which took place on 18 January 1486. The marriage symbolised the end of the War of the Roses and joined Elizabeth's House of York with Henry's House of Lancaster, founding the House of Tudor. The marriage bed would have been used on the couple's marriage night and it is believed that their first son Arthur, Prince of Wales (born 19/20 September 1486) was conceived on this occasion. The couple married at Westminster Abbey and the bed stood in the Painted Chamber of the nearby Palace of Westminster, as confirmed by the bed's outline matching the shape of a mural known to have been painted there. The bed may have been influenced by Burgundian designs but archaeologist Jonathan Foyle believes it to have been made in Germany and that Henry himself may have helped to design the bed. The bed is decorated with symbology to support Henry's claim to the throne and the connection between the king and the state as well as religious and fertility symbols.

The bed may have accompanied Henry on his royal progresses about the kingdom. It is possible that the future Henry VIII and Henry and Elizabeth's six other children were conceived in the bed. The bed is believed to have been gifted to Thomas Stanley, Henry's stepfather in 1495, but this could have been another bed commissioned by Henry. It is possible that a similar bed was also commissioned by Henry for his hunting lodge at Knowsley Hall. The bed was thought to have remained in use at Stanley's seat at Lathom House for a century before vanishing from the historical record. However, a bed matching the description and size of the royal bed (once losses to the depth of the bed indicated by the truncated upper side rails are accounted for) is found in the Henry VIII 1547 post-mortem inventory '‘oone bedstede gilt and painted with iiij of the planettes in the hed/and sondry other stories in the sides and fete being in length ij yerdes quarter and in bredith oone yerde iij quarters di/having Ceeler Tester’. Mosley family record indicates a royal bed was gifted to Sir Nicholas Mosley (c.1527–1612) by Elizabeth I after his year as Mayor of London in 1599/1600. In Family Memoirs (1849) by Sir Oswald Mosley, it is recorded how: 'Before the termination of his year of office, the Queen [Elizabeth I] was graciously pleased to mark her high approbation of the services of the lord mayor by conferring upon him the honour of knighthood, and she gave him, at the same time, a handsomely-carved oak bedstead, together with some other articles of furniture, for the new house which he had recently erected at Hough End [Manchester], on the site of the old mansion which his ancestors had inhabited'.

During the English Civil War (1642–1651) many Royalist possessions were destroyed by Parliamentarian forces, including almost all Royal beds. Henry VII's bed is the only complete bed frame to survive this destruction, the only other known Royal bed artefact being a fragment of the headboard of Henry VIII and Anne of Cleves. The bed appears to have come into the circle of George Shaw (1810–76) in the early 1840s when he corresponded with Sir Oswald Mosley of Rolleston Hall in Staffordshire, whereupon he later made and sold copies of it and other derivative 'Tudor' funriture to Northern aristocrats as genuine family relics. One example, the 'Henricus Rex' copy, below, is assumed to have been Shaw's first copy of the bed, made for an unknown client, although its references to Henry VII's lineage—Lady Margaret Beaufort in particular through the portcullis heraldry—and the arms of France and England, indicate he was aware of the Tudor bed's lineage. This, his best known copy, however has an illiterate approximation of the Tudor bed's carved decoration and complex iconographic programme.

Shaw is believed to have kept the front crest of the bed in his faux-antiquarian house, St Chad's, now Uppermill Town Library, and other pieces, a pair of royal heraldic achievements, incorporated into a sideboard at Chetham's Library, Manchester, but the remainder eventually ended up at the Redland House Hotel in Chester.

It has been thought the bed, in the 1970s, was unwittingly used as a stage prop in a number of British films, including the comedy film Carry On Dick, however it has now been shown to be another of Shaw's 'copy beds' supplied to a local Lancashire family in the 1840s.

=== Rediscovery ===
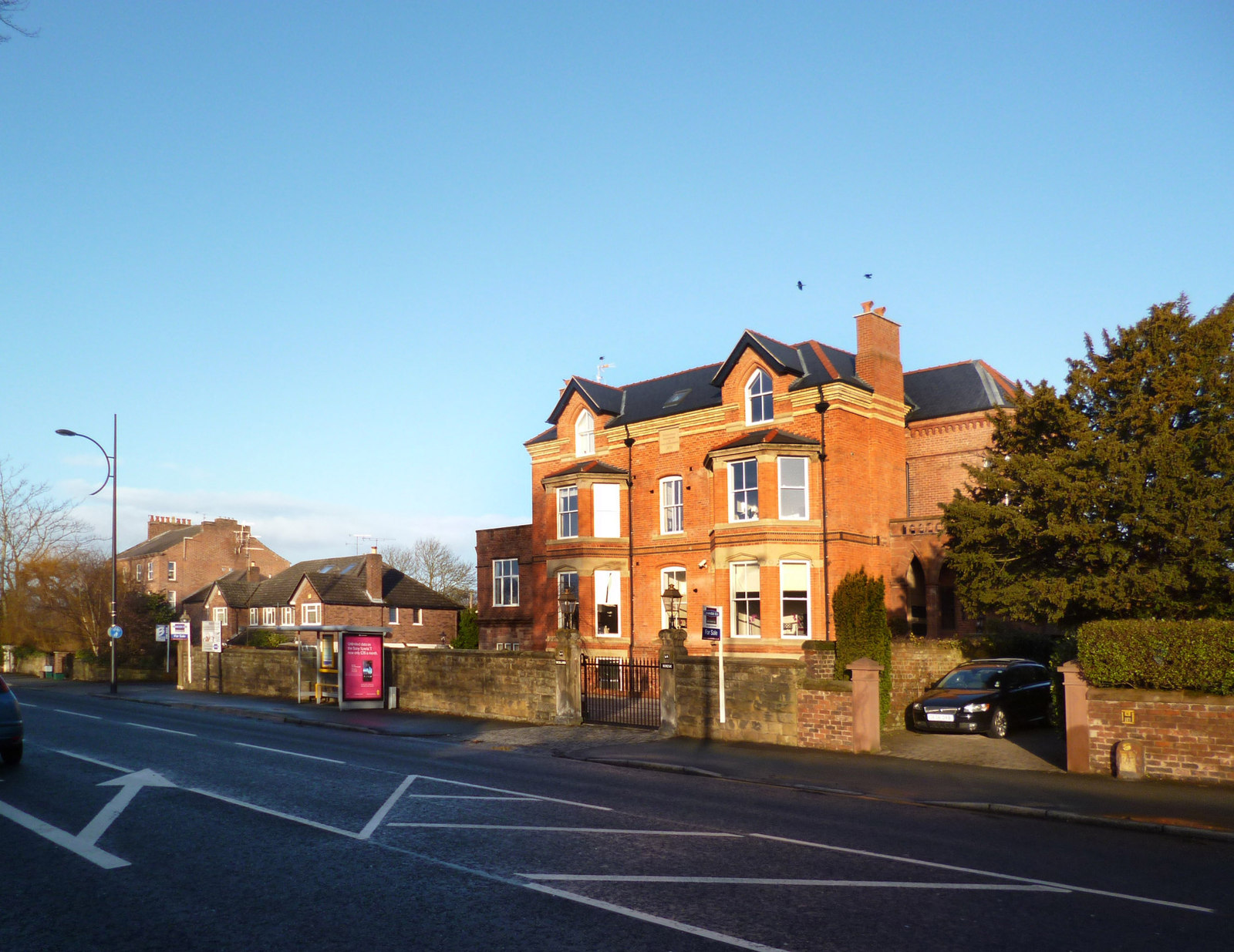
The former Redland House Hotel in Chester

For over 15 years the bed was the prized feature of the honeymoon suite of the Redland House Hotel . It had been purchased from an Edinburgh-based antique dealer in the 1990s. In 2010 the Redland House Hotel underwent redevelopment and the bed was at risk of being thrown away but it was spotted by an antique dealer who suggested selling it at auction. The bed was dismantled and for a while lay in the hotel car park before being collected by the auctioneers. It was described in the auction catalogue as "profusely carved Victorian four poster bed with armorial shields".

== Analysis ==
When Coulson finally got to examine the bed when it was delivered to his studio a few weeks after the sale he was immediately struck by the age of the wood, noting the degree of oxidisation, shrinkage, the damage caused by extensive woodworm infestation, that the carvings had been made by hand rather than by machine—all of which suggested to him that this was a bed of a considerable age. He began to suspect the bed was not a Victorian piece. A more detailed examination, which involved the opening of joints and the identification of later repairs, revealed evidence of medieval construction techniques, markings - clues to the original appearance and configuration of the bed. He noted that the main crest of the bed was missing. Coulson shared his findings with a range of other experts who agreed with his suggestion that this was a Tudor era bed. The distinctive Adam and Eve headboard and the carved detailing of the bedposts suggested that the bed was possibly the model for the forged beds and other pieces of furniture known to have been produced by George Shaw during the 1840s. Coulson has commissioned various forms of scientific analysis to determine the date and provenance of the bed.

=== DNA analysis ===
The analysis of DNA extracted from several separate parts of the bed clearly demonstrated that the wood was a species of oak native to Continental Europe (probably the Baltic Region). DNA tests of the wood proved that it all came from a single continental European oak tree, of a type known to have been imported by the English royal family for their beds.

=== Dendrochronology ===
Dendrochronology is a valuable tool for establishing the felling dates of trees, but the science is reliant on the existence of previously dated reference samples – or chronologies. In some cases, matches are simply not found, even for otherwise well documented timbers.

In 2014 a blind-testing dendrochronology investigation was commissioned. This analysis failed to make a match on European databases but did make an important new observation; cockchafer beetles had infested the wood used to make the bed on two separate occasions. This insect attack would have defoliated the infected trees limiting their growth and reducing the thickness of tree-rings during those two years. Dendrochronology protocols decree that trees exhibiting signs of this type of infestation and deformation are excluded from the tree-ring dating database.[i]

Another dendrochronology investigation carried out on the bed did not find a match in the European databases. it failed to note the repeated cockchafer infestation. A match was found with a tree felled sometime after 1756 in north-eastern US but as the DNA analysis had confirmed that it was made from European oak these findings are problematic. Because of the cockchafer infestation, dendrochronology on this bed will not provide a date for the age of its wood.

=== Paint research ===
Traces of paint were observed in the crevices of the mouldings suggesting that the bed had once been painted. Microscopic examination of these residues revealed that the bed had originally been painted. The presence of the pigment Coal Black, a pigment which dropped out of use by housepainters in the seventeenth-century, support the dating of the bed to the late medieval period. Traces of an early grained decoration and high quality finely ground yellow and red iron oxide pigments found on the bed provide evidence that the bed was originally painted – and at some expense.Fragments of paint containing large particles of the pigment natural ultramarine blue, a pigment more expensive that gold leaf during the Middle Ages, provided further evidence of the high status of the bed.

The findings of the paint research investigation were presented to leading paint research experts at an ICOM-CC held and published in post prints.

All of the research carried out on the bed was presented at a one-day symposium at the Victoria & Albert Museum in London, January 2019.

The bed itself featured in the "A Bed Of Roses" exhibition at Hever Castle. Foyle, who carried out research on the bed, described it as "one of the most significant artefacts of early Tudor history" and "the most important piece of furniture in England". The bed is held in Coulson's Langley Collection of historic beds.

== Art historical investigation ==
It has been suggested that the bed was designed and built to celebrate the marriage of King Henry VII to Elizabeth of York on 18 January 1486. The marriage symbolised the end of the War of the Roses by joining Henry's House of Lancaster to Elizabeth's House of York and the bed's design reflected this featuring both the White Rose of York and the Red Rose of Lancaster. A carving on the headboard depicted the Royal couple as either Adam and Eve or Christ and the Virgin Mary defeating the animals that opposed Christ in Psalm 91 and bringing paradise to England (hence the bed's alternative name). The bed also includes the arms of France, reflecting Henry's possessions and ambitions there, as well as religious and fertility symbols.

It is thought the bed may have been gifted to Henry's stepfather, Thomas Stanley, in 1495 and remained in use by the Stanley family for a hundred years. It then vanishes from the historic record, surviving the wide-scale destruction of Royal furniture during the English Civil War, before reappearing in 1842 when copies of it were made but its true significance remained unknown.

Others, however, disagree with the hypothesis outlined above, which has been disseminated mainly by press coverage and has not been submitted to any peer reviewed journal. it is suggested that the bed was known to the 19th century antiquary, architect and faker George Shaw (1810–76) who used it as the model for his own faked 'Tudor' beds.

Details of the Henry VII and Elizabeth of York marriage bed and Victorian copy
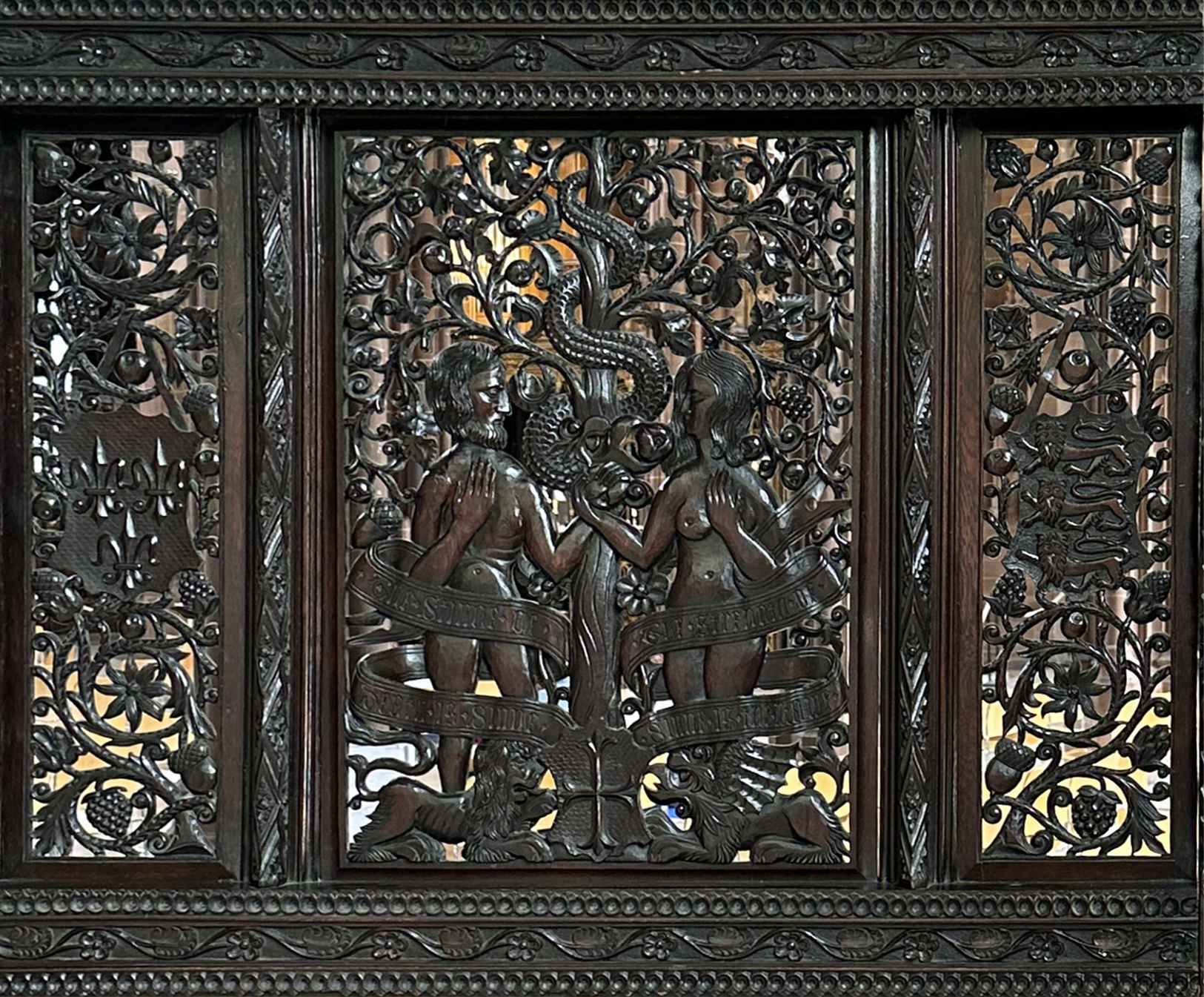
Detail of the headboard of the Henry VII and Elizabeth of York marriage bed

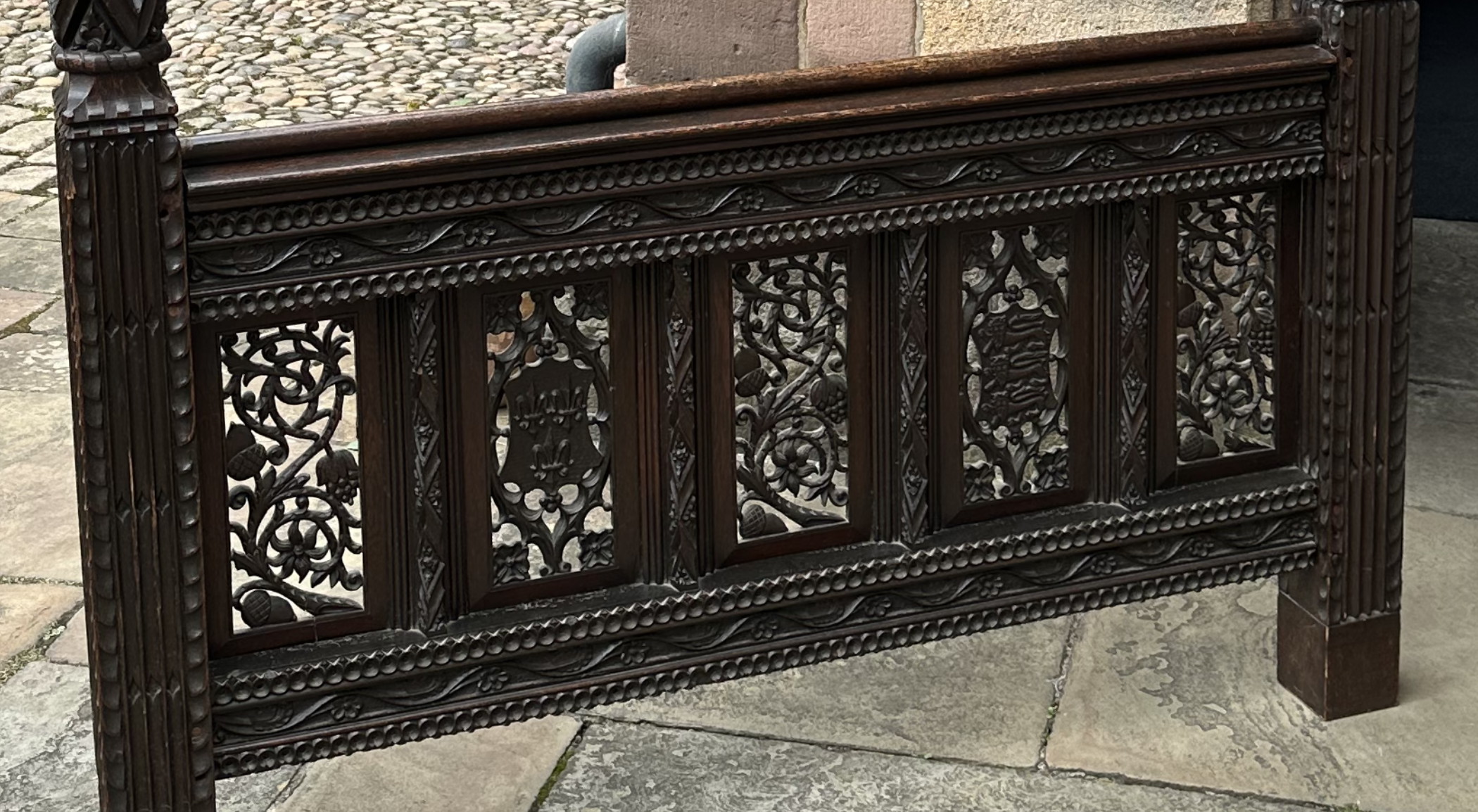
Detail of the footboard of the Henry VII and Elizabeth of York marriage bed

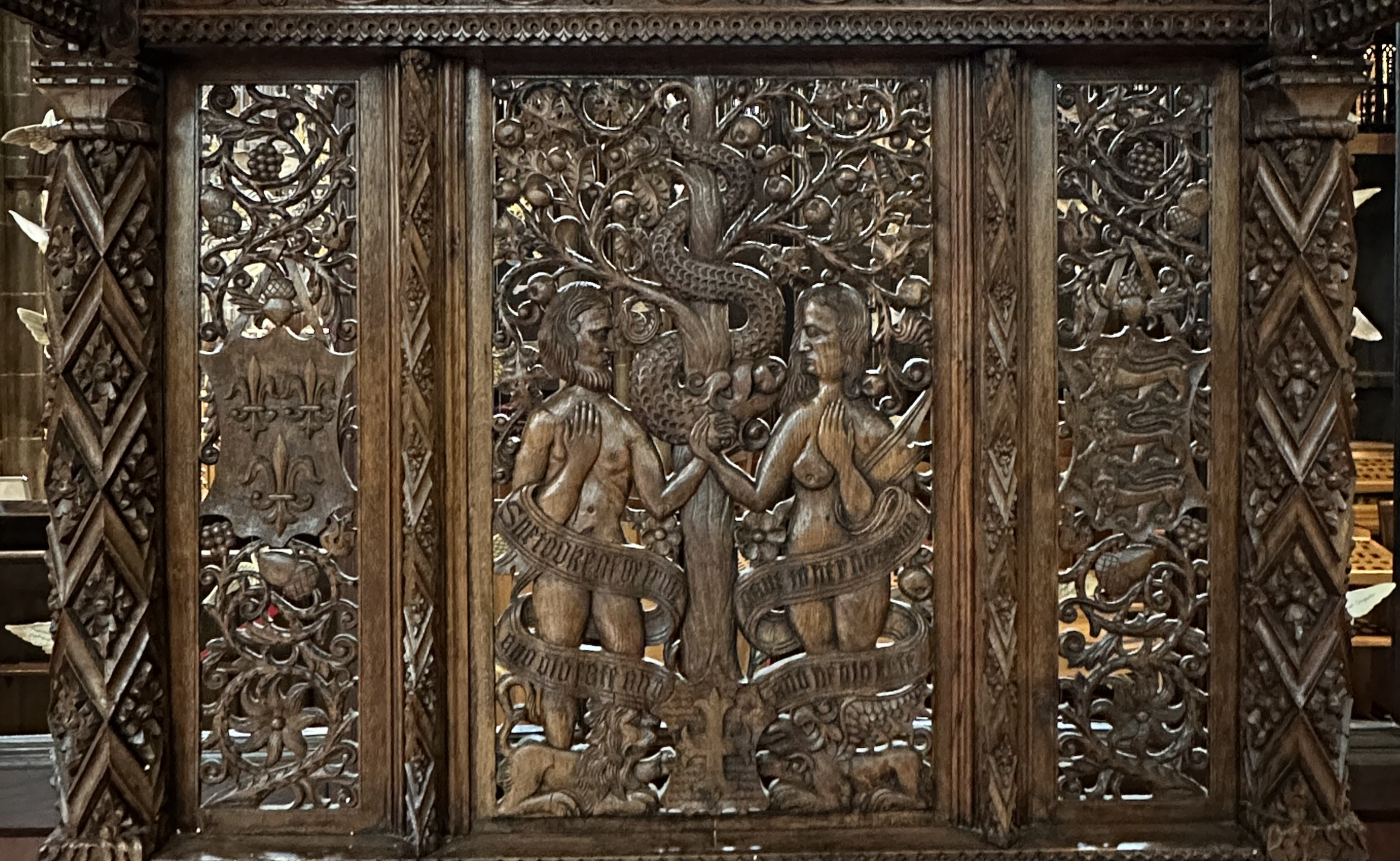
Detail of the headboard of the George Shaw 'Henricus Rex' copy bed

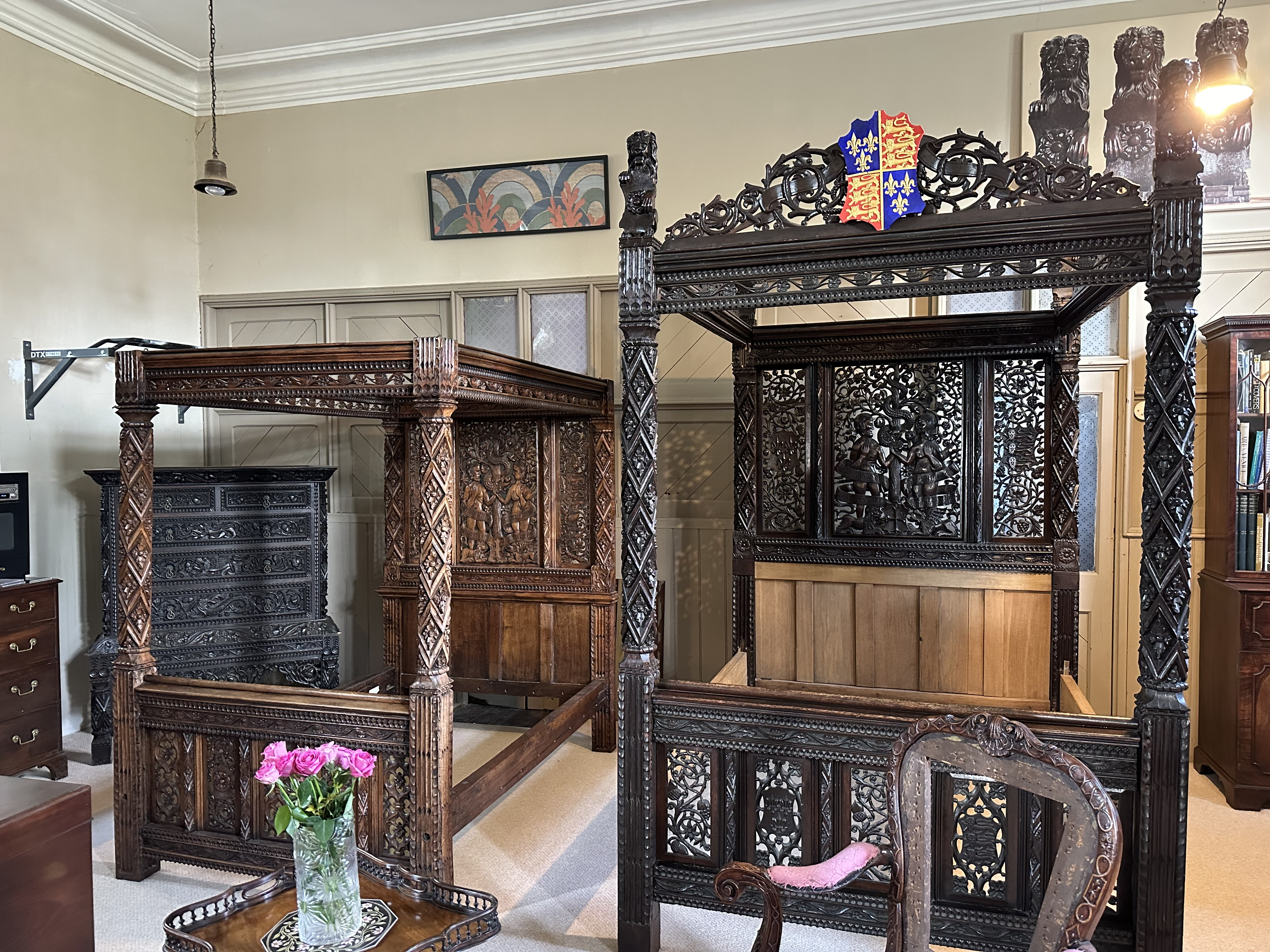
Comparison of the Tudor and Victorian copy bed
