= Four-poster bed =

Bed with a vertical column at each corner

Four-poster bed

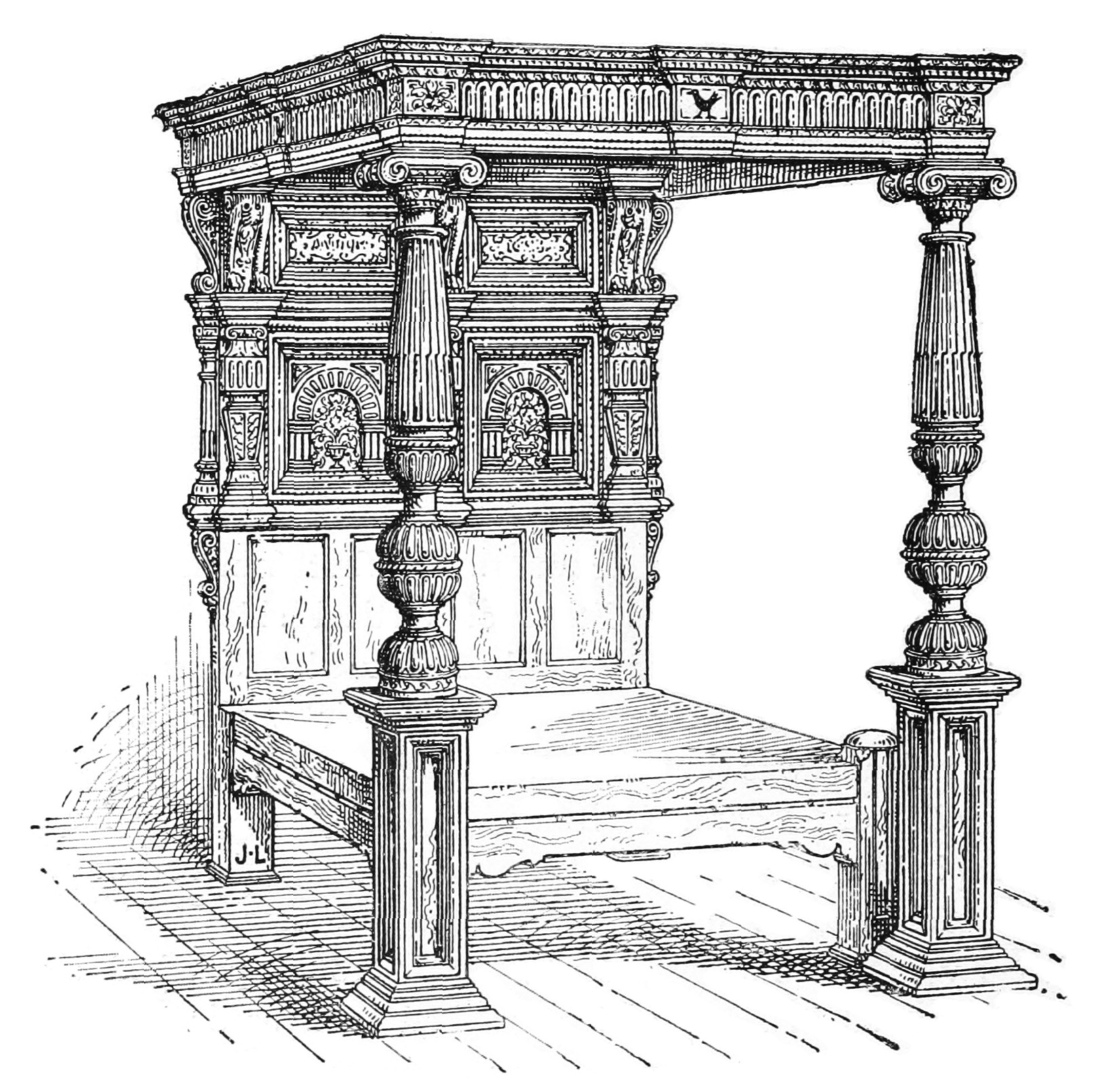
Ornate Elizabethan four-poster bed

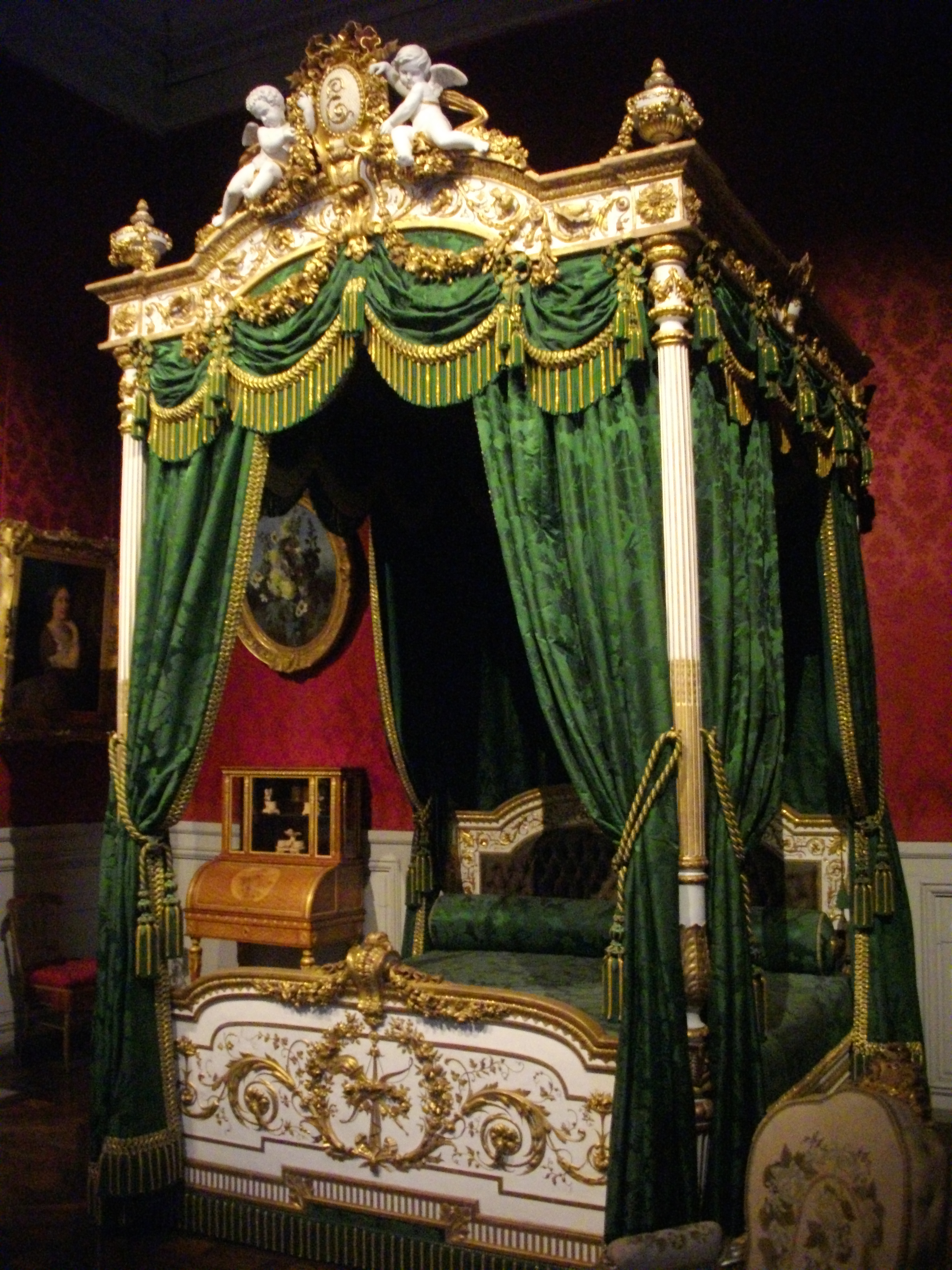
Four-poster bed (lit à colonnes), 19th century, château de Compiègne, France

A four-poster bed or tester bed is a bed with four vertical columns, one in each corner, that support a tester, or upper (usually rectangular) panel or bedknobs. This tester or panel will often have rails to allow curtains to be pulled around the bed. There are a number of antique four-poster beds extant dating to the 16th century and earlier; many of these early beds are highly ornate and are made from oak.

Four-poster beds were developed for several practical reasons. Bedrooms often had drafts and could be cold at night: the curtains could be closed to help keep the occupant of the bed warm. The curtains also helped to give privacy to the sleepers, since servants and bodyguards often slept in the same room, especially in the case of royalty, served by a special group of servants of the bedchamber (usually noble courtiers), lords and ladies of the bedchamber, esquires of the body, etc. In the medieval era and up to the 18th century beds were items of furniture on which great personages and royalty made public appearances and held court, thus they were designed to impress. A four-poster bed with backboard and tester allowed extra space from which to display and hang expensive fabrics and heraldic decoration.

== History ==
A four-poster bed is referenced in the Mishnah in the 3rd century CE.

Four-poster beds are mentioned in numerous Irish sagas and were recorded in early Irish manuscripts. In the 12th century tale of Acallam na Senóradh, in the wooing of Credhe, Cael ua Nemhnainn cites in a poem "Four posts round every bed there are, of gold and silver laid together cunningly; in each post's head a crystal gem: they make heads not unpleasant [to behold]", when speaking of a fairy-mansion on the Paps of Anu, in County Kerry.

The marriage bed of Henry VII, thought to date from 1486, is a four-poster bed.

A 16th-century four-poster bed in Crathes Castle in Scotland was made for the original owners of the castle.

== See also ==
- Canopy bed
- Mosquito net
- Domestic furnishing in early modern Scotland
