= Lucy Creamer =

British professional climber

Personal information
- Nationality: English
- Born: 19 April 1971 (age 55) Taunton, Somerset, England, United Kingdom

Climbing career
- Type of climber: Competition climbing; Traditional climbing; Alpine climbing; Ice climbing; Mixed climbing
- Highest grade: Onsight/Flash: E7 6c (traditional)
- First ascents: Mighty Aphrodite M9 Ouray, Colorado
- Major ascents: Hasse-Brandler UIAA VIII, 500m Cima Grande, Dolomites, Italy
- Known for: British Leading Champion: 1997/98, 1999, 2001, 2003, 2005, 2006, 2007

Lucy Creamer (born 19 April 1971) is a British professional climber who has participated in a broad range of activities including competition climbing, traditional climbing, sport climbing, alpine climbing, and ice climbing & mixed climbing.

== Competition climbing ==
According to her website, her competition climbing rankings are as follows:

- British Leading Champion: 1997/98, 1999, 2001, 2003, 2005, 2006, 2007.
- British Bouldering Champion: 2001.
- British Masters Champion: 1998.
- Best International result: Qualified through to final round, 9th place, 2003.
- Best Ice competition result: 2nd place, Ouray International Ice Festival.

== Media appearances ==
In 2011, Creamer appeared with Dr Jonathan Foyle in the BBC series Climbing Great Buildings. In the series, they climbed fifteen British buildings dating from the Norman era to the twenty-first century.

== Personal life ==
Creamer was born in Taunton, Somerset, but now lives in Sheffield - a city known for its large climbing community. After working as an outdoor instructor Creamer became a full-time climber and has entered many climbing competitions.

== See also ==
- Shauna Coxsey, British competition climber
