= Jonathan Foyle =

British architectural historian

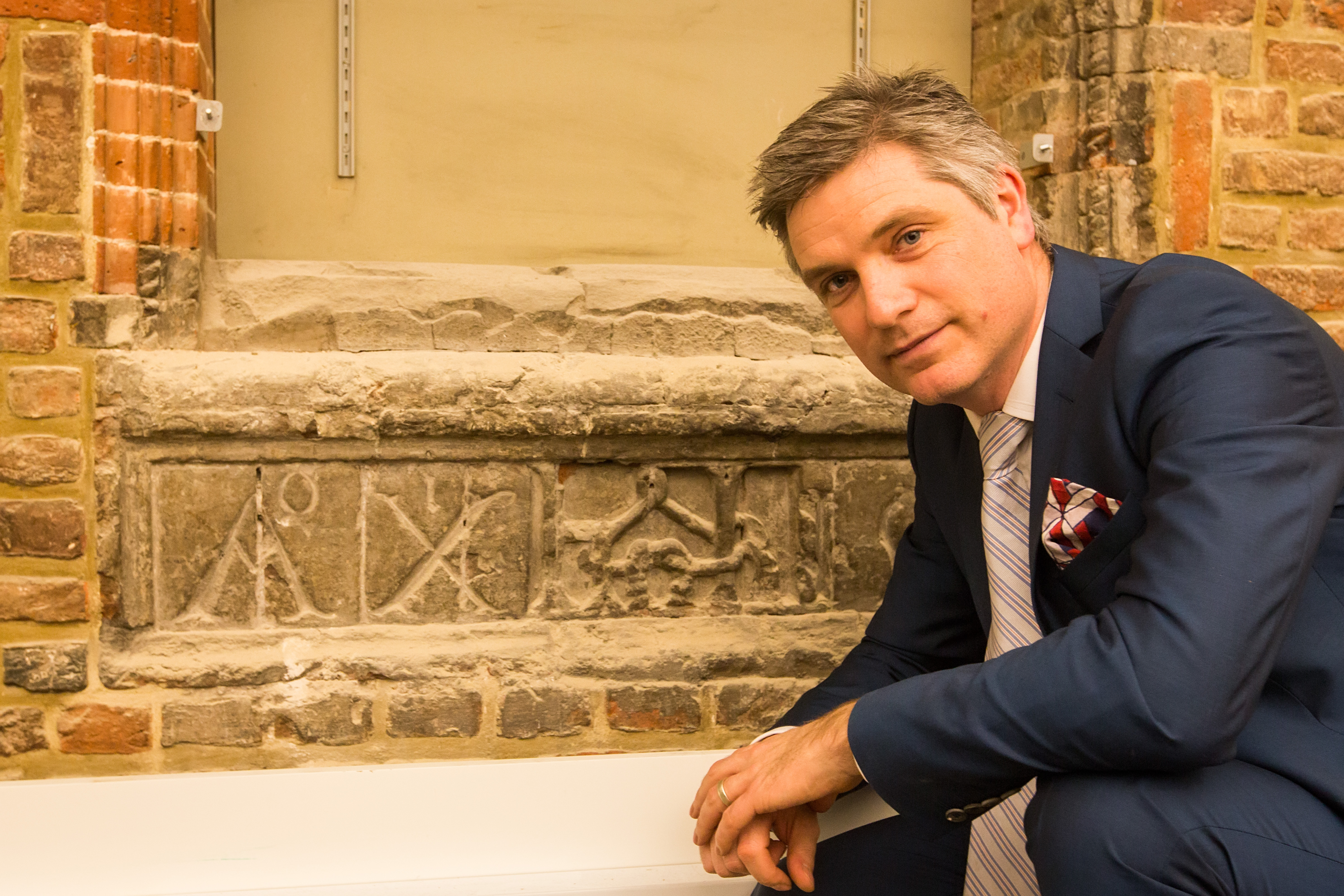
Foyle with the foundation stone from Deptford Dockyard

Jonathan Foyle is a British architectural historian, broadcaster and advocate for heritage sites. He is also an artist.

== Background ==
Foyle grew up in Market Deeping in Lincolnshire and attended The Deepings School. He has a Master of Arts from the Courtauld Institute of Art, and later worked for a year surveying the architectural details and structure of Canterbury Cathedral. He then became Curator of Historic Buildings for Historic Royal Palaces for eight years. During this time Foyle produced a thesis on the early history of Hampton Court and received a doctorate from the University of Reading in 2002. He also has an honorary degree in Conservation and Restoration from the University of Lincoln.

== Career ==
Foyle has written many scholarly papers and additionally contributed articles for a number of newspapers and popular magazines.

He is perhaps best known as a communicator on history. He has taught and lectured in Britain and around the world and has appeared and presented a number of television broadcasts.

Since 2002, he has presented films for Channel 4, the BBC, the History Channel, ITN, Lion and Discovery Channels. In 2009 he presented a series on Henry VIII as art patron. In 2010 he presented a television series Climbing Great Buildings.

In 2007 Foyle accepted the position of Chief Executive of World Monuments Fund Britain, the UK arm of a global charity, which aims to secure imperilled architectural sites for future generations.

== Television ==
=== BBC One ===
- Inside Out (Feb. 2010), reporter on Gloucestershire’s pyramids
- The One Show (2009), reporter on historic architecture

=== BBC Two ===
- Climbing Great Buildings (2010), presenter, 15-part series, along with climber Lucy Creamer
- The People’s Museum (2006), reporter
- History Mysteries (2005), series co-presenter
- Meet The Ancestors: The Lost Palace Of Hampton Court (2002), specialist

=== BBC Four ===
- People’s Palaces: The Golden Age Of Civic Architecture (2010) 2 x 1 hour, presenter
- Henry VIII: Patron Or Plunderer? (2009) 2 x 1 hour, presenter

=== Channel 4 ===
- Time Team Special: Henry VIII's Lost Palaces (2009), specialist contributor
- Time Team Special: The Arcadian Garden (2007), specialist contributor
- Time Team Special: The Royal Palaces: Buckingham Palace (2006), specialist contributor
- Time Team (2003– ), specialist contributor, including Kew Palace, Syon House, Greenwich Palace, Queenborough Castle, Hunstrete House, Chenies Manor

=== History Channel US ===
- Lost Worlds: The Pyramids (2008), investigator
- Lost Worlds: The Sphinx (2008), investigator
- Lost Worlds: The Vikings (2007), investigator
- Lost Worlds: Henry VIII (2007), investigator

=== Five ===
- County Secrets (2008) 10-part series, presenter

=== History Channel UK ===
- Hidden House History (2006), co-presenter

== Professional history ==
- 2007–present: Chief Executive, World Monuments Fund Britain
- 2003–2007: Freelance historian, teacher, presenter, consultant
- 1996–2003: Curator of Historic Buildings, Hampton Court and Kew Palaces, Historic Royal Palaces
- 1995–1996: Assistant to the Surveyor of the Fabric, Canterbury Cathedral

== Publications ==
- The Architecture of Canterbury Cathedral Scala (2012)
- ‘Conservation areas in China: the case of the Juanqinzhai in Beijing’ with Henry Tzu-Ng

English Heritage Conservation Bulletin 62 (2009)

- ‘Some examples of external colouration on English brick buildings, c. 1500–1650’

Bulletin du Centre de recherche du château de Versailles ‘Couleurs de l'architecture’(2002)

- 'A Reconstruction of Thomas Wolsey's Great Hall at Hampton Court Palace'

Architectural History Vol 45 (2002) pp. 128–58

Illustrations for:

- ‘Interpretations of the Rebuilding of Canterbury Cathedral, 1174–1186: Archaeological and Historical Evidence’

Journal of the Society of Architectural Historians 1997, Peter Draper

== See also ==
- Climbing Great Buildings
- University of Lincoln
