= High Street Dreams =

- Presented by: Jo Malone; Nick Leslau
- Country of origin: United Kingdom
- Original language: English
- No. of series: 1
- No. of episodes: 4

Production
- Running time: 60 minutes

Original release
- Network: BBC One; BBC HD
- Release: 10 May – 9 July 2010

High Street Dreams is a BBC television documentary series first aired in 2010 based around the development of products to sell in High Street shops and Supermarkets.

== Broadcast ==
The 4 episode show was aired on BBC One and BBC HD in the United Kingdom on Monday nights at 21:00. The first episode was aired on 10 May 2010 which saw The Singh Family and Muddy Boots try to find success in the food industry. Jo Malone and Nick Leslau helped them understand what they needed to do to be ready to pitch to a national retailer. The Singh Family needed to go back to the beginning of their branding process and recognise the most integral factors of their brand image. Loyd Grossman helped them understand why having four different titles on one bottle was confusing for a consumer. Muddy Boots got the importance of brand essence but had got their design and structure wrong. With almost unanimous results, their market research on the packaging proved that too much of the beefburger was shown and that it was squashed and unappealing. It was back to the drawing board for both of them. With the help of two London design agencies, they both had brand emersions and new concepts designed. They were then set the challenge of pitching their products to the customers in a large London Tesco store. At the end of this exercise, Jo and Nick decided whether they were ready to go through to pitch to supermarkets... they were. The Singh Family pitched to Asda and Roland and Miranda of Muddy Boots pitched to Waitrose. Both won contracts and started supplying the retailers in September 2010. The Singh Family have since had their listing increased and launched with Londis and independent retailers too. Waitrose tripled Muddy Boots's store listing in May 2012 to 90 stores (all over the UK) and their burgers are stocked by Ocado and Budgens nationwide as well.

== Episodes ==
Episode	Title	Content
1	"Food and Drink"	The brands for a chilli sauce and a gourmet beef burger are developed. Loyd Grossman also makes an appearance.
2	"Children and Toys"	The brands for a children's nutritional drink and outdoor play kit are developed.
3	"Fashion"	The brands for scarves kitted by grannies and handmade jewellery are developed.
4	"Home and Garden"	
