= I'm in a Rock 'n' Roll Band! =

- Genre: Music documentary
- Directed by: Matt O'Casey
- Presented by: Jonathan Ross (live final)
- Narrated by: Mark Radcliffe
- Theme music composer: Noel Gallagher
- Opening theme: "Rock 'n' Roll Star" by Oasis
- Country of origin: United Kingdom
- Original language: English
- No. of seasons: 1
- No. of episodes: 6

Production
- Executive producer: Mark Cooper
- Producer: Matt O'Casey
- Editor: Christopher Bird

Original release
- Network: BBC Two
- Release: 1 May – 5 June 2010

I'm in a Rock 'n' Roll Band! is a documentary television series broadcast on BBC Two, narrated by Mark Radcliffe and first broadcast from 1 May to 5 June 2010. The series charts the history of rock music, with the first five episodes focusing on different members of a typical band, such as the singer or the guitarist. The final episode is special live episode, featuring "industry experts discuss their favourite musicians before creating the ultimate fantasy band." This will also feature the result of a public vote, which will ask viewers who they think are the greatest rock bands and band members.

At the end of the series, Led Zeppelin were named the best ever band, while the make-up of the Ultimate Fantasy Band was announced as Freddie Mercury, Jimi Hendrix, John Bonham and Flea.

== Polls ==
Throughout the course of the series, a series of polls are being set up for people to vote for who they think is the greatest rock band and the best band members. The long-list was decided by a selection of industry experts. A new list is put up after each episode. These experts were:

- Zoë Ball
- Edith Bowman
- Fearne Cotton
- Bob Harris
- Jools Holland
- Greg James
- Shaun Keaveny
- Steve Lamacq
- Lauren Laverne
- Zane Lowe
- Annie Mac
- Stuart Maconie
- Scott Mills
- Huey Morgan
- Nemone
- Mark Radcliffe
- Jonathan Ross
- Huw Stephens
- Jo Whiley

=== Best Band ===
The nominations for the best rock band are:

- The Beatles
- The Clash
- The Jimi Hendrix Experience
- Joy Division
- Led Zeppelin (Winner)
- Nirvana
- Queen
- Radiohead
- The Rolling Stones
- The Smiths

=== Singers ===
The nominations for the best singer are:

- Bono – U2
- Kurt Cobain – Nirvana
- Jarvis Cocker – Pulp
- Debbie Harry – Blondie
- Mick Jagger – The Rolling Stones
- John Lydon/Johnny Rotten – The Sex Pistols and Public Image Ltd.
- Freddie Mercury – Queen (Winner)
- Morrissey – The Smiths
- Robert Plant – Led Zeppelin
- Iggy Pop – The Stooges

=== Guitarist ===
The nominations for the best guitarist are:

- Jeff Beck – The Yardbirds
- Matt Bellamy – Muse
- Eric Clapton – Cream
- Graham Coxon – Blur
- Jimi Hendrix – The Jimi Hendrix Experience (Winner)
- Johnny Marr – The Smiths
- Jimmy Page – Led Zeppelin
- Slash – Guns N' Roses
- Pete Townshend – The Who
- Jack White – The White Stripes

=== Drummers ===
The nominations for the best drummer are:

- Ginger Baker – Cream and Blind Faith
- John Bonham – Led Zeppelin (Winner)
- Phil Collins – Genesis
- Stewart Copeland – The Police
- Dave Grohl – Nirvana
- Mitch Mitchell – The Jimi Hendrix Experience
- Keith Moon – The Who
- Ringo Starr – The Beatles
- Lars Ulrich – Metallica
- Charlie Watts – The Rolling Stones

=== Bassist ===
The nominations for the best bassist are:

- John Entwistle – The Who
- Flea – Red Hot Chili Peppers (Winner)
- Peter Hook – Joy Division and New Order
- Alex James – Blur
- John Paul Jones – Led Zeppelin
- Lemmy – Motörhead
- Gary "Mani" Mounfield – The Stone Roses and Primal Scream
- Paul McCartney – The Beatles and Wings
- Paul Simonon – The Clash
- Tina Weymouth – Talking Heads

== Live final ==
From the long lists for best band, singer, guitarist and drummer, a shortlist of three nominations each went forward for discussion in the live final. The short lists were as follows:

Band

- The Beatles
- Led Zeppelin
- Queen

Singer

- Kurt Cobain – Nirvana
- Freddie Mercury – Queen
- Robert Plant – Led Zeppelin

Guitarist

- Jimi Hendrix – The Jimi Hendrix Experience
- Jimmy Page – Led Zeppelin
- Slash – Guns N' Roses

Drummer

- John Bonham – Led Zeppelin
- Dave Grohl – Nirvana
- Keith Moon – The Who

The winners of the best band, drummer, singer and guitarist were decided by phone voting during the live final. The winner of the best bassist was decided by online voting. At the end of the live final, all the results were announced, as follows:

=== Best Band ===
- Led Zeppelin

=== Ultimate Fantasy Band ===
- Singer – Freddie Mercury
- Guitarist – Jimi Hendrix
- Drummer – John Bonham
- Bass – Flea
