= Peter Raymond Draper =

- Born: 23 October 1957 (age 68); Bradford, England, UK
- Known for: Research on Nursing

Academic background
- Education: Leeds Polytechnic (now Leeds Beckett University); University of Leeds; University of Hull; University of Durham

Academic work
- Discipline: Nursing
- Institutions: University of Hull
- Website: www.hull.ac.uk/faculties/staff-profiles/peter-draper.aspx

Peter Raymond Draper FHEA (born 23 October 1957) is Professor (Emeritus) of Nursing Education and Scholarship and former Director of the Teaching Excellence Academy at the University of Hull. He is also a Self-Supporting Minister in the Church of England.

== Education ==
Draper is a Registered Nurse with a BSc in nursing from Leeds Polytechnic (now Leeds Beckett University) (1986), a Certificate in Education from the University of Leeds (1987), a PhD in nursing from the University of Hull (1994) and a Diploma in Theology and Ministry from the University of Durham (2005).

== Professional life ==
Draper has led the postgraduate portfolio in nursing at the University of Hull and has conducted research in the areas of care of older people, interdisciplinary education and spirituality.

== Awards and recognition ==
Draper was awarded a National Teaching Fellowship (2013) and is a Principal Fellow of the Higher Education Academy.

== Bibliography ==
Draper has 110 publications listed on Google Scholar that have been cited more than 3000 times, giving him an h-index of 22. His three most-cited articles are:

- Draper, P (2004). "Quality of Life Research: a critical introduction". Nurse Researcher. 12 (1): 91–93. doi:10.7748/nr.12.1.91.s11. PMID 28718737.
- Baldaccino, D; Draper, P (2004). "Spiritual coping strategies: a review of the nursing research literature". Journal of Advanced Nursing. 34 (6): 833–841. doi:10.1046/j.1365-2648.2001.01814.x. PMID 11422554.
- McSherry, W; Draper, P; Kendrick, D (2002). "The construct validity of a rating scale designed to assess spirituality and spiritual care". International Journal of Nursing Studies. 39 (7): 723–734. doi:10.1016/s0020-7489(02)00014-7. PMID 12231029.
