= Chinese Food in Minutes =

2010 British TV cooking show

- Presented by: Ching He Huang
- Country of origin: United Kingdom
- Original language: English
- No. of series: 1
- No. of episodes: 13 x 30 minutes

Production
- Running time: 30 minutes

Original release
- Network: Five
- Release: 9 February – 4 May 2010

Chinese Food in Minutes is a UK-based series, based upon Ching He Huang's cookbook of the same name, published by HarperCollins in September 2009.

== Overview ==
Observed by two people who are completely new to preparing Chinese meals ("wok virgins"), Ching in every episode makes "two versions of authentic Chinese dishes and takeaway classics" as well as another dish. She gives the audience advice about various Chinese cuisine themes during every episode.

According to The Northern Echo, "viewers who can't even boil an egg need not worry, for the show is aimed at kitchen novices whose idea of cooking a meal revolves around reheating past night’s leftover takeaway in the microwave". The Daily Mirror's Jane Simon said of the show, "It's a mix of the easy-to-follow teaching method of Delia Smith mashed up with Jamie Oliver’s habit of cooking for pals." The Western Mail said of the two neophytes who join her in each show, "she soon transforms them from dumpling dunces to Szechuan supremos".

Dishes she cooked on the show include Sichuan aubergine, mushroom pak choi, chicken and black bean stir fry, garlic chilli beef, fried sweet chilli chicken, and sweet and sour ribs.

== Broadcasts ==
Chinese Food in Minutes is a 13-part peak time cooking television series commissioned and shown by Five and funded by Sharwood's, first aired on 9 February 2010. Every episode was 30 minutes long and had an audience of around one million. The first episode served up 1 million viewers and a 4% share during a segment that typically had 400,000 watchers. The series Chinese Food in was based on Huang's title of the same name, published by HarperCollins in September 2009.

== Publications ==
A recipe book accompanies the TV series.

- Ching's Chinese Food in Minutes (HarperCollins, 2009) ISBN 978-0-00-726500-8
