= Mountain Gorilla (TV series) =

BBC television documentary series

- Genre: Documentary
- Narrated by: Patrick Stewart
- Country of origin: United Kingdom
- Original language: English
- No. of episodes: 3

Production
- Production location: Albertine Rift

Original release
- Network: BBC Two

Mountain Gorilla is a 2010 three-part television series produced by the BBC Natural History Unit that features intimate footage of the last remaining wild population of the eponymous great ape. The BBC filmmakers were granted access to habituated groups of mountain gorillas in their highland stronghold: DR Congo's Virunga National Park and Uganda's Bwindi Impenetrable Forest. The cameras follow field scientists, veterinary teams, and anti-poaching patrols for six months as they watch over the gorillas, providing medical care, protection, and observations on their daily lives. The study of these apes was initiated by the primatologist Dian Fossey in the late 1960s.

Mountain Gorilla is narrated by actor Patrick Stewart and was first broadcast on 22 August 2010 on BBC Two.
