= Style Queen =

- Also known as: Dannii Minogue: Style Queen
- Starring: Dannii Minogue
- No. of episodes: 3

Production
- Production locations: United Kingdom; Australia; South Africa; Hong Kong
- Running time: 60 minutes

Original release
- Network: ITV2
- Release: 4 August – 18 August 2010

Dannii Minogue: Style Queen is a three-part television documentary featuring Australian artist Dannii Minogue that aired on ITV2 in August 2010.

The TV show followed Dannii Minogue as she prepared launch her brand-new fashion range Project D.

The documentary gave viewers behind the scenes access with Dannii, as she allowed cameras access in the run up to her dream business at the same time juggling all the other important elements in her life; TV, music, red-carpet events, modelling, writing her autobiography, her boyfriend Kris, travelling between London and Australia for Australia's Got Talent – and her most important job – her impending motherhood.

The show was originally broadcast on ITV2 on 4, 11 and 18 August 2010. It will make its Australian Premiere on Wednesday, 23 February 2011 at 7:30pm on FOX8.
