= Banded Brothers =

- Genre: Nature; Documentary; Drama
- Narrated by: Dexter Fletcher
- Country of origin: United Kingdom
- Original language: English
- No. of series: 1
- No. of episodes: 4

Production
- Executive producer: Wendy Darke
- Producer: Colin Jackson
- Production locations: Mweya, Uganda
- Cinematography: Mark MacEwan; John Waters; Ralph Bower; Luke Barnett; Helen Johnson
- Editors: Michael Chichester; Chris Mullineux
- Running time: 58 minutes

Original release
- Network: BBC Two
- Release: 21 February – 14 March 2010

Banded Brothers (also known as Banded Brothers: The Mongoose Mob) is a British television program that aired on BBC Two in 2010. It followed the lives of a family of banded mongooses in Queen Elizabeth National Park in Uganda.

The series was inspired by the Banded Mongoose Research Project run by scientists from the University of Exeter and Cambridge University. Dr Michael Cant of University of Exeter and other researchers spent six months in Uganda assisting the BBC in obtaining footage without disturbing the animals.

It aired on Sundays during February and March 2010, and was filmed and presented in the style of Meerkat Manor.
