= Climbing Great Buildings =

- Genre: Documentary
- Presented by: Jonathan Foyle
- Country of origin: United Kingdom
- Original language: English
- No. of series: 1
- No. of episodes: 15

Production
- Executive producer: Emma Read
- Producer: Adam Barry
- Running time: 30 minutes
- Production company: ITN Productions

Original release
- Network: BBC Two, BBC HD
- Release: 6 September – 28 September 2010

Climbing Great Buildings is a British television series made for the BBC by ITN Productions. The series, first broadcast on BBC Two from 6 to 28 September 2010, consists of fifteen half-hour programmes each featuring one famous British structure from the last 1000 years.

The presentation team use rock climbing techniques to access internal and external parts of each building to illustrate construction techniques and materials and other details not usually visible. The team consists of the architect Dr Jonathan Foyle, the climber Lucy Creamer and camera operator Ian Burton, assisted by a rigging team. Foyle is known for his television presentations of architectural history, which subject he also teaches for Cambridge University's International Division. Creamer provides expert advice and encouragement to Foyle, as well as being a sounding-board for his on-site explanations.

== Episodes ==
Date first broadcast	Building	Period or century
6 September 2010	Durham Cathedral*	Norman
7 September 2010	Lincoln Cathedral	12th-14th
8 September 2010	Caernarfon Castle*	13th
9 September 2010	New College, Oxford	
10 September 2010	Layer Marney Tower	16th
13 September 2010	Burghley House	16th
14 September 2010	St Paul's Cathedral	17th
15 September 2010	Blenheim Palace*	18th
20 September 2010	Clifton Suspension Bridge	19th
21 September 2010	St Pancras railway station, including the Midland Hotel	19th
22 September 2010	Glasgow School of Art	19th
23 September 2010	Royal Liver Building*	early 20th
24 September 2010	Coventry Cathedral	mid 20th
27 September 2010	Lloyd's Building	late 20th
28 September 2010	Imperial War Museum North	21st

*World Heritage Site

== See also ==
- Don't Look Down
