= Peter Draper (architectural historian) =

English architectural historian (born 1943)

Peter Draper (born 7 May 1943) is an English architectural historian. He has specialised in medieval architecture with a particular interest in English ecclesiastical building, primarily cathedrals, and the relationship between the architecture and its social, political and liturgical functions. Latterly his research has extended to Islamic architecture and its influence on Western traditions. He is Professor emeritus and an honorary life member of Birkbeck College, University of London where he is currently visiting professor in the History of Architecture. He has published numerous articles and books including The Formation of English Gothic : Architecture and Identity, for which he won two prestigious awards; the Spiro Kostof Book Award from the Society of Architectural Historians in 2008 and the Alice Davis Hitchcock Medallion in 2009, awarded by the Society of Architectural Historians of Great Britain.

== Career ==
After graduating from King's College, Cambridge in 1964, Draper went onto study for a PhD at the Courtauld Institute of Art where he was taught by the renowned medievalist, Peter Kidson, whose "inspirational teaching", as Draper has said, motivated him into the study of architecture. Draper spent his early career as a librarian in the Conway Library at the Courtauld before taking up a position as lecturer at Birkbeck College in 1969. He undertook this role, becoming senior lecturer in 1993, until his retirement in 2004 when, as professor emeritus, he took up the position of visiting professor in the School of History of Art and Screen Media at Birkbeck. In 2004 he wrote the obituary in The Guardian for his friend and colleague, the art historian Linda Murray who specialised in Renaissance art.

Draper was elected a Fellow of the Society of Antiquaries of London in 1979.

== Other ==
Peter Draper often takes his own photographs to illustrate his writing and, while he was at the Courtauld, he donated photographs to the Conway Library, whose archive, of primarily architectural images, is in the process of being digitised as part of the wider Courtauld Connects project. One of those photographs, of a hoodmold, has been used in the Encyclopædia Britannica as an example of that particular piece of architecture.

== Public office ==
- First World War Cathedral Centenary Fabric Repairs Fund, member of expert panel, 2014
- English Heritage Commissioner, appointed 1 September 2011
- British Archaeological Association, President 2007–10, joint editor of the Medieval Conference Transactions, 1978–82, Honorary Secretary, 1968-72
- Society of Architectural Historians of Great Britain President 2000–4, Honorary Editor of Architectural History, 1985-92
- Cathedrals Fabric Commission for England, member 2001-11
- Fabric Advisory Committee Southwark Cathedral, Chairman 1995–2008, member 1992-2016

== Books ==
- 'Observations on the Conception of Architecture and its Realisation in the Medieval Period: The Kailasanatha at Ellora' in Mapping New Territories in Art and Architectural Histories: Essays in honour of Roger Stalley, eds. Niamh NicGhabhann, Danielle O'Donovan, Turnhout : Brepols, 2021, ISBN 978-2503564623
- The Formation of English Gothic : Architecture and Identity, New Haven, Conn. & London : Yale University Press, 2006, ISBN 9780300120363
- Reassessing Nikolaus Pevsner, editor & contributor, Aldershot England & Burlington VT. : Ashgate, 2004, ISBN 9781351552073
- Artistic Integration in Gothic Buildings, eds. Virginia Chieffo Raguin, Kathryn Brush, Peter Draper, University of Toronto Press, 2nd edition, 1995, ISBN 0802074774
- Medieval Art and Architecture at Ely Cathedral, eds. Nicola Coldstream, Peter Draper, London : British Archaeological Association, 1979, ISBN 9781905981151
