= Pussy Riot 2012 trial =

Russian trial

Pussy Riot gained global notoriety when five members of the group staged a performance inside Moscow's Cathedral of Christ the Saviour on February 21, 2012. The group's actions were condemned as sacrilegious by the Orthodox clergy and eventually stopped by church security officials. The women said their protest was directed at the Orthodox Church leaders' support for Putin during his election campaign. On March 3, 2012, two of the group's members, Nadezhda Tolokonnikova and Maria Alyokhina, were arrested and charged with hooliganism. A third member, Yekaterina Samutsevich, was arrested on March 16. Denied bail, the three were held in custody until their trial began in late July. On August 17, 2012, Alyokhina, Samutsevich and Tolokonnikova were all convicted of "hooliganism motivated by religious hatred" and each sentenced to two years' imprisonment. On October 10, following an appeal, Samutsevich was freed on probation and her sentence suspended. The sentences of the other two women were upheld.

The trial and sentence attracted considerable attention and criticism, particularly in the West. The case was taken up by human rights groups, including Amnesty International, which designated the women as prisoners of conscience, and by a number of prominent entertainers. Public opinion in Russia was generally less sympathetic towards the band members. Having served 21 months, Tolokonnikova and Alyokhina were released on December 23, 2013, after the State Duma approved an amnesty.

== Legal proceedings ==
=== Arrest ===
On February 26, 2012 a criminal case was opened against the band members who had participated in the Moscow cathedral performance on February 21. On March 3, Maria Alyokhina and Nadezhda Tolokonnikova, two alleged members of Pussy Riot, were arrested by the Russian authorities and accused of hooliganism. Both women at first denied being members of the group and started a hunger strike in protest against being held in jail away from their young children. The defendants were held without bail. On March 16, another woman, Yekaterina Samutsevich, who had earlier been questioned as a witness in the case, was similarly arrested and charged.

Defense attorney Nikolai Polozov said that both Tolokonnikova and Samutsevich were also members of the Voina group, and both had previously staged disruptive protests in the Tagansky Court building, where they would be judged. He argued that their two previous attempts to disrupt proceedings would bias the judge, and preclude a fair outcome at that location. "I believe that the judge will certainly remember my clients, and could easily take offense to it, and therefore could not make an objective decision". The three detained members of Pussy Riot were declared political prisoners by the Union of Solidarity with Political Prisoners (SPP). On March 25, Amnesty International named them prisoners of conscience due to "the severity of the response of the Russian authorities".

Speaking at a liturgy in Moscow's Deposition of the Robe Church on March 21, Patriarch Kirill condemned Pussy Riot's actions as blasphemous, saying that the "Devil has laughed at all of us … We have no future if we allow mockery in front of great shrines, and if some see such mockery as a sort of bravery, an expression of political protest, an acceptable action or a harmless joke." The church's membership varied in its opinions on the case; a petition calling for the women to be forgiven was signed by approximately 5,000 lay members.Patriarch Kirill spoke of "his heart breaking with bitterness" when he heard that some Orthodox Christians sought mercy and forgiveness for the women.

Formal charges against the group were presented on June 4, the indictment running to 2,800 pages. By late June 2012, disquiet over the trio's detention without setting a trial date and concern over what was regarded as excessive and arbitrary treatment, led to the writing of an open letter. It was signed by leading opposition figures, as well as by director Fyodor Bondarchuk, a supporter of Putin, and actors Chulpan Khamatova and Yevgeny Mironov, both of whom had appeared in campaign videos supporting Putin's re-election. Singer Alla Pugachyova appealed on the women's behalf, stating that they should be ordered to perform community service rather than imprisoned. Meanwhile, Nikita Mikhalkov, head of the Russian Cinematographers' Union, stated that he would gladly sign an open letter against them.

On July 4, the defendants were informed that they would have to finish preparing their defense by July 9. They announced a hunger strike in response, saying that two working days was inadequate time to finish preparing their trial defense. On July 21, the court extended their pre-trial detention by a further six months.

=== Trial, conviction, and sentencing ===
The trial of the three women started in Moscow's Khamovniki District Court on July 30, 2012. Charged with "premeditated hooliganism performed by an organized group of people motivated by religious hatred or hostility," they faced possible sentences of up to seven years in prison. In early July, a poll conducted in Moscow found that half of the respondents opposed the trial while 36 percent supported it; the rest being undecided. Putin stated that while he saw "nothing good" about the band's protest, "Nonetheless, I don't think that they should be judged so harshly for this."

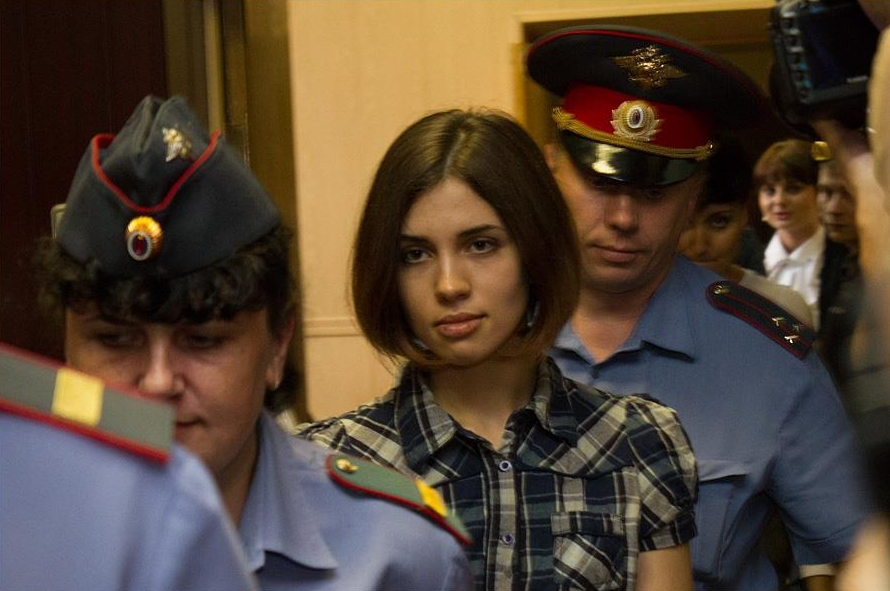
Nadezhda Tolokonnikova

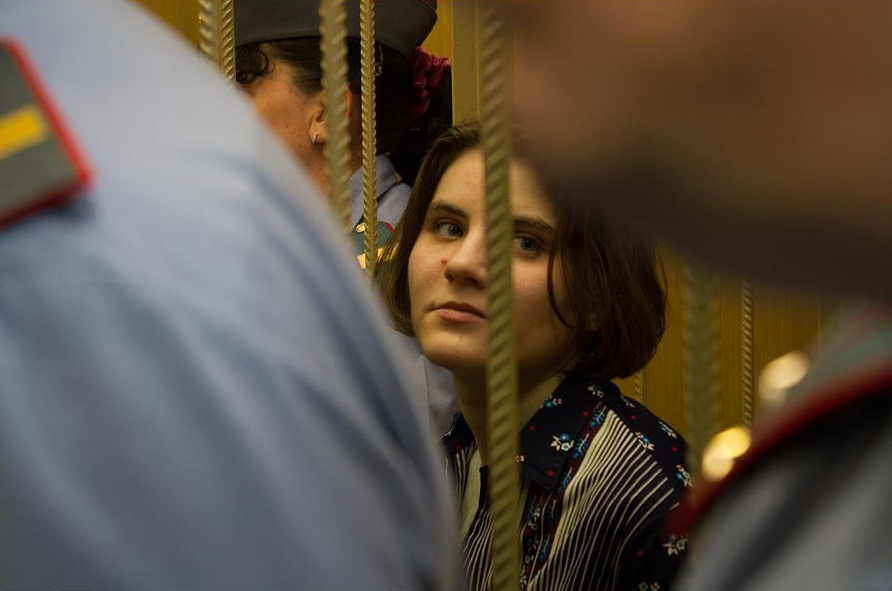
Yekaterina Samutsevich

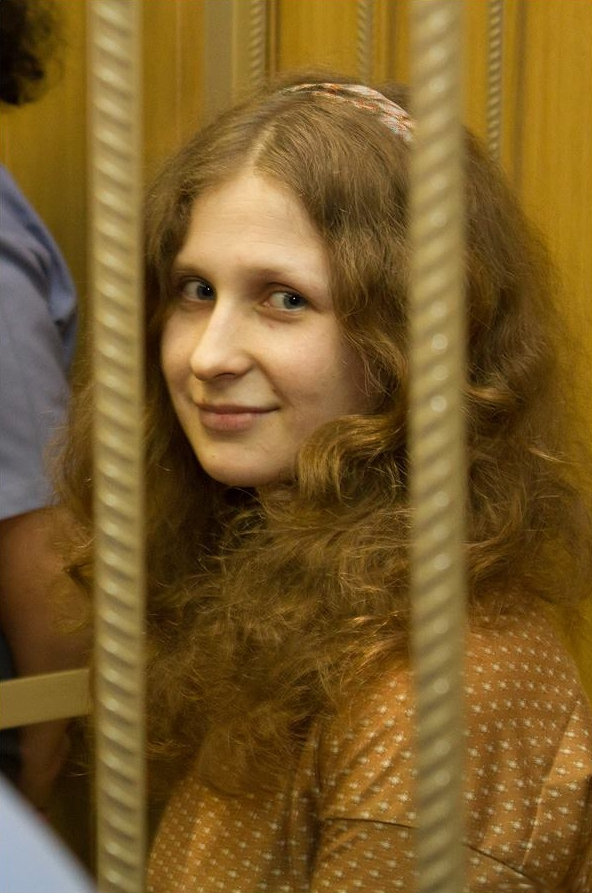
Maria Alyokhina

The three Pussy Riot members at their trial in Tagansky District Court

The defendants pleaded not guilty, saying that they had not meant their protest to be offensive. "We sang part of the refrain 'Holy shit'," Tolokonnikova said in court. "I am sorry if I offended anyone with this. It is an idiomatic expression, related to the previous verse — about the fusion of Moscow patriarchy and the government. 'Holy shit' is our evaluation of the situation in the country. This opinion is not blasphemy." Their lawyers stated that the circumstances of the case had revived the Soviet-era tradition of the show trial. On August 15, 20 protesters wearing balaclavas gathered in support of Pussy Riot at Christ the Savior Cathedral, and held up placards reading "Blessed are the merciful". Cathedral guards quickly moved against the protesters, trying to detain them and taking off their balaclavas.

Pussy Riot said their protest was a political statement, but prosecutors said the band was trying to "incite religious hatred" against the Orthodox Church. In "Putin Zassal", Pussy Riot had stated "The Orthodox Religion is a hardened penis / Coercing its subjects to accept conformity", among other examples of the group's antagonism to the Church as an organization, which it views as corrupt. Thus central issues of the case were the definition of "hatred" against a religion, and whether blasphemy can exist in a secular state. Pavel Chikov, Chairman of the Agora Human Rights Association, said that defense lawyers were able to maximize publicity by creating "a huge public outcry over the case", but at the expense of defendants' liability.

All three were convicted by the judge and sentenced to two years in a penal colony on August 17, 2012. The judge stated that they had "crudely undermined the social order" with their protest, showing a "complete lack of respect" for believers. Mark Feygin, a lawyer for the trio, stated that they would appeal the verdict, but that "Under no circumstances will the girls ask for a pardon [from Putin] … They will not beg and humiliate themselves before such a bastard". Tolokonnikova stated that "Our imprisonment serves as a clear and unambiguous sign that freedom is being taken away from the entire country."

Both supporters and critics of the band demonstrated at their sentencing hearing. Opposition leader Sergei Udaltsov, who was protesting in support of the band, was detained by police. Former world chess champion and long standing opposition member Garry Kasparov, who tried to attend the reading of the verdict, was arrested and beaten.

Former Finance Minister Alexei Kudrin described the verdict as "yet another blow to the court system and citizens' trust in it", harming the country's international image. Putin responded that religious organizations should be protected, because "the country has very grave memories of the initial period of Soviet rule, when a huge number of priests suffered. Many churches were destroyed and all our traditional faiths suffered huge damage."

=== Appeal to the Moscow City Court ===
On October 1, 2012, an appellate hearing was postponed in the Moscow City Court (a regional court, similar to the supreme court of a republic) after Samutsevich informed a panel of three judges that she wished to terminate the representation of her defense attorneys as "My position in the criminal case does not coincide with their position."

In an interview for his 60th birthday broadcast on October 7, shortly before the appeal was heard, Putin said that Pussy Riot had "undermined the moral foundations" of the country and that they "got what they asked for". In response, Pussy Riot lawyer Violetta Volkova accused Putin of putting pressure on the court.

On October 10, Samutsevich's new lawyer, Irina Khrunova, argued that her client had not in fact committed the acts of hooliganism in the church as she was prevented from accessing the soleas by church security. The court appeared to accept this argument, and released Samutsevich on two years' probation. However, the judges rejected the appeals of Tolokonnikova and Alyokhina, upholding their convictions and sentences.

Writing for The New Republic, Russian-American journalist Julia Ioffe commented that by arguing that Samutsevich was innocent because she had not participated, Khrunova's defense had implied that Tolokonnikova and Alyokhina had in fact committed a crime, and had cut off "the one path to redemption that the group actually had: ignoring the court's proceedings and denying its legitimacy". Some commentators saw Samutsevich's unexpected release as a divide and rule tactic on the part of the authorities. Details later emerged of an alleged Nasedka ("mother hen"), a prisoner who spies on fellow inmates and manipulates them into co-operating with the authorities in return for privileges and early parole. A convicted fraudster named Irina Orlova was placed in the same cell as Samutsevich, where she apparently gained her trust and persuaded her to change lawyers. Any alleged agreement with authorities would have required Samutsevich to publicly denounce her former lawyers.

=== Imprisonment ===
Initial reports suggested that the women would serve their sentence in one of three provinces. The decision upon a general-security women's corrective labor colony (the most common type of prison in Russia) in the Republic of Mordovia, approximately 400 kilometers from Moscow, was later confirmed by Tolokonnikova's husband. The women asked authorities to let them serve their sentence at the pre-trial detention facility in Moscow. Their request was denied, and Tolokonnikova and Alyokhina were then dispatched to penal colonies in Mordovia and Perm Oblast, respectively.

The IK-2 and IK-14 penal colonies in Yavas, Zubovo-Polyansky District, Mordovia, are the most common destinations for women prisoners sentenced in Moscow. It is the former location of the Dubravlag labor camp complex of the Gulag system. Tolokonnikova was incarcerated in IK-14, whereas Alyokhina was sent to IK-32 in Perm. The latter is a colony for first-time offenders, which houses a sewing factory, and an experimental vocational program to re-train women prisoners to become digital cartoon animators. Conditions in IK-32 are relatively favorable, and neither prisoners nor human rights monitors have filed complaints about its conditions. Meanwhile, IK-14 has a harder reputation.

In November 2012, Alyokhina requested to be voluntarily placed in solitary confinement, citing "strained relations" with her fellow prisoners. Tolokonnikova also has experienced friction with inmates at IK-14, who have regarded her "at best with contempt, at worst with hostility", according to a report by Aleksey Baranovsky, Coordinator of the Human Rights Center "Russian Verdict".

On September 23, 2013, Tolokonnikova announced that she was staging a hunger strike in protest of alleged human rights violations in the prison. A translation of her letter describing the prison conditions was published in The Guardian. On September 27, 2013, she was placed in the medical ward after not eating for five days.

== Reactions ==
In response to questions posed by The Guardian and handed to the band through their lawyer, Pussy Riot accused Putin and the Russian Orthodox Church of orchestrating the case. Samutsevich said in December 2012 that "more than anything, what many people didn't see during the trial were those moments when our 'right to defence' was violated. It's not that we were helpless, it was a situation of despair." In an interview with The Guardian, she continued: "The trial was built in such a way that we couldn't defend ourselves. They didn't listen to us. We could have sat downstairs, where you wait till you're taken to the courtroom, and not go in at all and everything would've gone the same way. The fact that we took part physically [in the trial] didn't actually change anything."

Russian human rights activist Lyudmila Alexeyeva called the judgment politically motivated and "not in line with the law, common sense or mercy". Opposition activist Alexei Navalny described Pussy Riot as "fools who commit petty crimes for the sake of publicity", but opposed the verdict, which he believed had been "written by Vladimir Putin" as "revenge", for a stunt not socially dangerous enough to justify keeping the women behind bars. Russian fiction writer Boris Akunin attended the protests on the day of the conviction and said, "Putin has doomed himself to another year-and-a-half of international shame and humiliation." Irina Yarovaya, a parliamentary deputy of Putin's United Russia party, praised the conviction, stating that "they deserved it". On September 13, 2012, Russian Prime Minister Dmitri Medvedev called for the women's early release, saying that the time they had already served awaiting trial was sufficient punishment, and further incarceration would be "counterproductive". On November 2, he said that he would not have sent the three Pussy Riot members to prison, reiterating that their pre-trial detention was enough, but stressed that setting free the two remaining prisoners was a matter for the courts.

The foreign ministries of the United States and of European Union nations called the sentence "disproportionate". President Barack Obama expressed disappointment, and the White House stated that it had "serious concerns about the way that these young women have been treated by the Russian judicial system."

According to BBC Monitoring, in the European and American press there was "almost universal condemnation" of the two-year sentence imposed on the three members of the group.

Simon Jenkins of The Guardian argued the West was being hypocritical, in that excessively harsh prison terms were by no means unknown in Western countries. Some in the media also raised concerns that a place of worship is not an appropriate venue for any form of protest, and that Pussy Riot's cause did not morally justify their actions. The Roman Catholic Pope Benedict XVI expressed his solidarity with the position of the Russian Orthodox Church on the "acts of vandalism" at the Cathedral of Christ the Saviour, and expressed surprise at the reaction of some media organizations to those events.

== Aftermath ==
On June 30, 2013, Vladimir Putin signed a bill imposing jail terms and fines for insulting people's religious feelings, which some have seen as a response to the "punk prayer" performed by the Pussy Riot in a Moscow cathedral. In a "Live TV" (Russian: "Прямой Эфир") show aired on September 30, 2013, by Rossiya 1 TV channel, Maria Alyokhina pledged to do no more shows at churches. "We've paid attention to the fact that, as it turns out, since 2013 this has been a criminal offense, and we've repeatedly heard opinions from people whom we take seriously. This is basically the reason why we wouldn't go to the Cathedral of Christ the Savior again – or, unquestionably, to any other church for that matter," Alyokhina said.

Though they were due for release in March 2014, on December 19, 2013, Russian President Vladimir Putin announced that Tolokonnikova and Alyokhina would be freed under a general amnesty. Putin said the amnesty was not drafted with Pussy Riot in mind but to mark the 20th anniversary of Russia's post-Soviet constitution. The announcement of amnesty came during a Putin press conference in which he revealed plans to release several other high-profile political prisoners in Russia, such as Mikhail Khodorkovsky and members of Greenpeace.

=== Internal disputes ===
In a letter from prison after their sentences were upheld, Tolokonnikova and Alyokhina disowned the actions of Tolokonnikova's husband, Verzilov, accusing him of having co-opted Pussy Riot by acting as its frontman without their consent: "His statements are lies, in the name of giving himself the status of the founder and legal representative of Pussy Riot, when in fact, he is not. Actually, Pyotr Verzilov has occupied Pussy Riot through this strange, quasi-fraudulent activity. As a representative of the group, I am outraged." Samutsevich expressed surprise at the letter, while Verzilov declined to comment, saying "I do not understand it. We are going to find out what happened". The previous week, Verzilov himself had released a statement to the Echo of Moscow radio station, stating that he was neither a member nor a representative of Pussy Riot.

A trademark dispute arose in October and November 2012, when it was discovered that the group's defense attorney, Mark Feygin, had attempted to register "Pussy Riot" as a trademarked brand name in Russia. On April 6, 2012, Feygin applied to Rospatent without the knowledge of his clients, seeking to assign the brand to a company owned by his wife, Natalia Kharitanova-Feygin. This would give them exclusive rights to produce Pussy Riot-branded products. Furthermore, Kharitanova-Feygin has already received an advance payment of 30,000 euros to produce a film about the Pussy Riot trial, with an additional 170,000 euros payable upon completion of the contract, and 40 percent of the profits of worldwide sales of videos. The trademark application was rejected by Rospatent, leaving the ultimate fate of the Pussy Riot brand, estimated without promotion to be worth US$1 million, undecided.

On November 19, Feygin and the two other original lawyers for Pussy Riot withdrew from the case prior to Tolokonnikova's appeal, stating that they felt the court would be more likely to grant the appeal if the three were no longer a part of the defense. Samutsevich criticized the original legal team for allegedly using the trial for personal publicity rather than securing the release of the defendants. On November 21, Samutsevich's lawyer told the press that Samutsevich was considering requesting that Feygin and the other original lawyers be disbarred for failing to return her passport and other belongings. Feygin responded via Twitter that Samutsevich was part of a "defamation campaign organized by the authorities", while another member of the legal team, Violeta Volkova, responded that the claims were "part of an agreement that allowed her to break free of the case". On January 21, 2013, Feygin, Volkova, and Nicholas Polozov filed suit against Khrunova and Kommersant for defamation.

In a letter dated February 1, 2013 and published by her father on the Echo of Moscow web site, Tolokonnikova distanced herself from Samutsevich, saying "Samutsevich hasn't written to me for two months. That's it, to me she is already dead. There will be no more talk of collaborating after this."

=== Public opinion in Russia ===
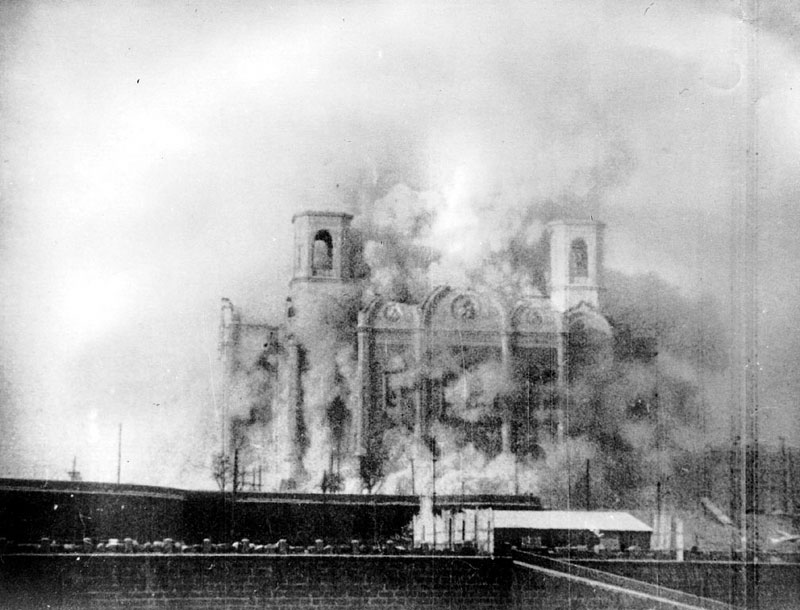
In 1931, Joseph Stalin ordered the demolition of the Cathedral of Christ the Saviour in Moscow

The court's decision aroused little sensation domestically. Many Russians were outraged by Pussy Riot's church protest and supported the right of the majority to worship in peace. The Christ the Savior Cathedral was destroyed in 1931 on the order of Soviet leader Joseph Stalin (it was rebuilt in the 1990s), adding to the location's significance to believers. At the conclusion of the trial, a series of Levada Center polls showed that, of 1600 Russians surveyed in 45 cities nationwide, 42% also believed Pussy Riot had been arrested for insulting the shrines and beliefs of the Orthodox Church. Meanwhile, 29% saw it as a case of general hooliganism, while only 19% saw it as a political protest against Putin. Overall opinion was for the most part negative or indifferent. Only 6% sympathised with Pussy Riot, while 41% felt antipathy towards them. 44% believed the trial was "fair and impartial", while 17% believed it was not. Of those following the case, 86% favored some form of punishment, ranging from prison to forced labor or fines, while 5% said they should not have been punished at all. A prison sentence of 2 to 7 years was seen as appropriate by 33%, whereas 43% saw two or more years as excessive, and a further 15% said the defendants should not have been prosecuted in court. A research assessment by the Exovera company noted that, in online discussion forums, "there was clearly an awareness of being judged by the global community, whose response was referred to in some cases as 'hysterical' and unfair".

The conservatism of the public was criticized by some Russian commentators. Levada Center director Lev Gudkov commented on the results, stating that most Russians got their information from television and therefore perceived events in accordance with the state's "official version".

In the statement published after the sentence had been announced, the Russian Orthodox Church stated that while the actions of Pussy Riot were offensive to "millions of people," the Church called "on the state authorities to show mercy to the people convicted within the framework of the law, in the hope that they will refrain from repeating blasphemous actions." Vsevolod Chaplin, chairman of the Synodal Department for the Cooperation of Church and Society of the Moscow Patriarchate, accused Pussy Riot of blasphemy, insulting believers and "kindling hatred between believers and atheists".

In contrast to the laws in Russia, Pussy Riot became symbols of defiance and expression—examples of the very freedom they seek. There’s a mutual understanding that these musicians are ‘rights-bearing expressive agents’ contributing to aesthetics and music, a form of social and political agency. Pussy Riot represents the communities finding themselves at odds with Russian authority.

=== Pussy Riot and Voina ===
The connection between Pussy Riot and the political performance art group Voina was highlighted by some of the group's critics, who called it an "aggravating moral circumstance" in the eyes of the conservative public (which constitutes about 60 per cent of Russians). Pussy Riot members Nadezhda Tolokonnikova and Yekaterina Samutsevich were members of Voina from 2007 until the group split in 2009, and participated in a number of Voina's provocative art performances.

Tolokonnikova was part of a performance in which couples were photographed having public sex in the Timiryazev State Biology Museum in Moscow in February 2008. This exhibitionist act was intended as a satire of Dmitry Medvedev's call to increase the birth rate in Russia, but was typically described as an "orgy" by the media. President Putin, in an interview about whether the prison sentence was justified, also invoked the defendants' prior actions in Voina stunts: "They had a group sex session in a public place. They then uploaded it onto the Internet. The authorities should have looked into this, too."

Some critics made little or no distinction between Pussy Riot and Voina, incorrectly attributing past actions of Voina to Pussy Riot. In particular, a notorious performance by Voina in St. Petersburg, in which a woman stole a chicken from a supermarket by stuffing it in her vagina, is sometimes cited by detractors of Pussy Riot. However, there is no evidence that members of Moscow-based Pussy Riot participated in this action.

=== International support ===
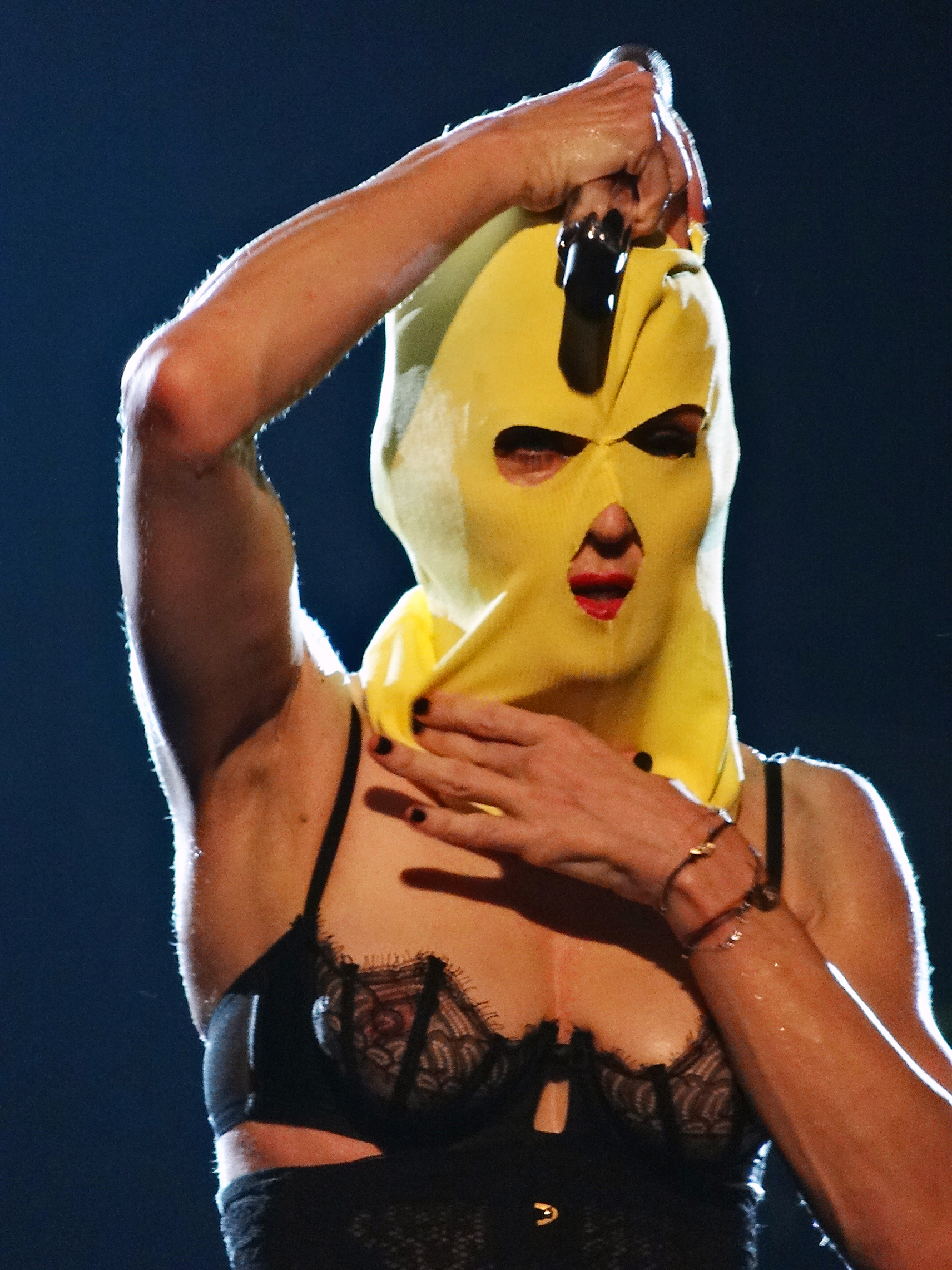
Madonna expressing her support to Pussy Riot during The MDNA Tour in 2012.

During the trial, the three women became an international cause célèbre due to their treatment. Many international artists, politicians, and musicians voiced support for the release of Pussy Riot, or expressed concern about the fairness of their trial, including Madonna, who openly expressed her support at a Moscow concert, Björk, who dedicated her song "Declare Independence" to their cause and invited them to join her on stage to perform the song with her, Paul McCartney, and Aung San Suu Kyi. While acknowledging the support, members of Pussy Riot distanced themselves from Western artists and reiterated their opposition to the capitalist model of art as commodity: One of them, identified as Orange, said:

We're flattered, of course, that Madonna and Björk have offered to perform with us. But the only performances we'll participate in are illegal ones. We refuse to perform as part of the capitalist system, at concerts where they sell tickets.

French singer Mireille Mathieu, who frequently performed in Russia, was one of the few western entertainers to speak out against Pussy Riot, saying they had committed a sacrilege. Nevertheless, she asked for "indulgence" (lenience or pardon) for the three women.

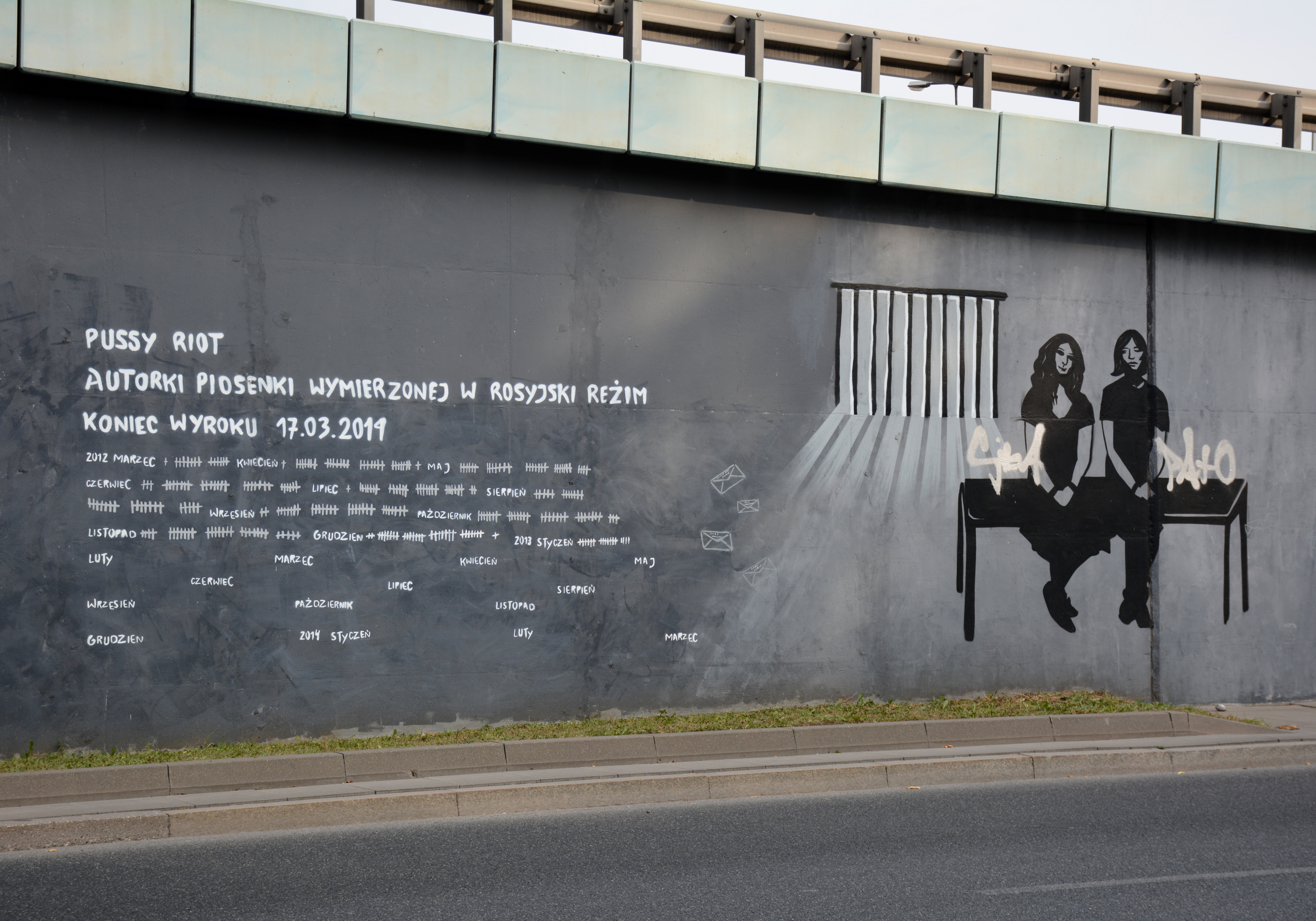
Graffiti in Warsaw, Poland

From 2012 to 2014, The Voice Project coordinated donations through an international legal defense and support fund for Tolokonnikova and Alyokhina during their imprisonment, which supported the women's legal expenses, supplied them with provisions while in the prison camps and child care, in addition to safety monitoring by local Russian lawyers. The Voice Project also conducted a number of viral campaigns in advocacy for the women during their imprisonment, such as the "Where is Nadya?" campaign, during Tolokonnikova's 26-day disappearance following her hunger strike, during which she was transferred to a Krasnoyarsk prison hospital. During Tolokonnikova's imprisonment, The Voice Project also made an urgent appeal to United Nations Special Rapporteur on Torture Juan E. Méndez, requesting that the UN pressure the Russian Federation to enforce international laws on human rights and torture in regards to minimum standards set by UN protocols and the European Convention on Human Rights.

A letter of support from 120 members of the German parliament, the Bundestag, was sent to the Russian Ambassador to Germany, Vladimir Grinin. It described proceedings against the women as disproportionate and draconian. On August 9, 2012, 200 Pussy Riot supporters in Berlin marched, wearing colored balaclavas, in a show of support for the group. Attending the trial, British MP and Shadow Foreign Office Minister for Human Rights, Kerry McCarthy, also backed the group, describing proceedings as "surreal". Lech Wałęsa criticised the church performance as "tasteless", but nevertheless wrote to Putin urging him to pardon the women.

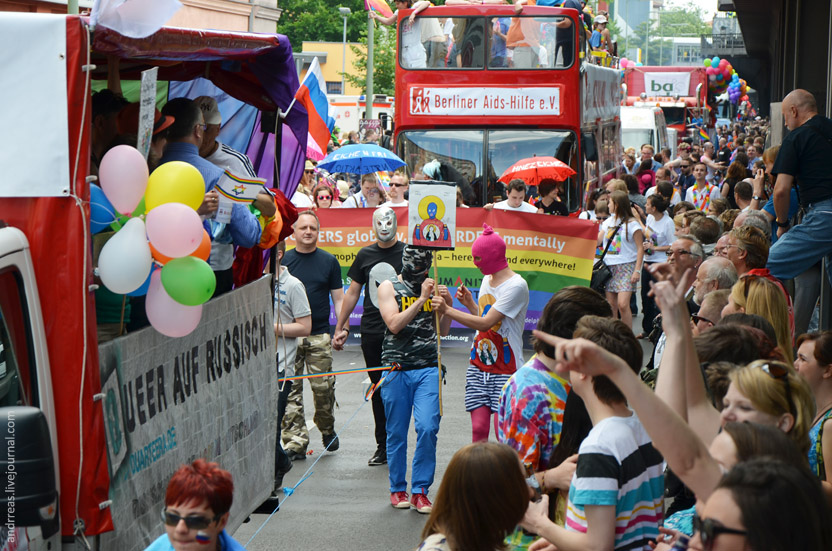
Protest in Berlin, Germany in June 2012

Amnesty International called the conviction "a bitter blow for freedom of expression". Hugh Williamson, of Human Rights Watch, stated that the "charges and verdict … distort both the facts and the law.... These women should never have been charged with a hate crime and should be released immediately." ARTICLE 19, Freedom House, and the International Federation for Human Rights also issued statements condemning the sentence. On September 21, 2012, the Feminist Press published an e-book entitled Pussy Riot! A Punk Prayer for Freedom to raise funds for the legal defense team.

On September 22, Yoko Ono awarded the band the biennial LennonOno Grant for Peace, stating that she intended to work for the group's immediate release. In October 2012, Pussy Riot was announced as a finalist for the European Parliament's Sakharov Prize for Freedom of Thought, named for Soviet dissident Andrei Sakharov. The prize ultimately went to Iranian human rights lawyer Nasrin Sotoudeh and filmmaker Jafar Panahi. The city of Wittenberg, where Martin Luther nailed his Ninety Five Theses to the church door, nominated Pussy Riot for its annual Martin Luther "Fearless Speech" prize. The nomination provoked opposition from many theology experts, including leadership of the Evangelical Church in Germany (EKD). In November the prize was awarded to a group of Regensburg restaurateurs for an anti-Nazi campaign.

While attending the Women in the World Summit in New York on April 4, 2014, Hillary Clinton posed with band members Nadezhda Tolokonnikova and Maria Alekhina for a picture she later posted on Twitter. Clinton referred to Pussy Riot as a group of "strong and brave young women" who "refuse to let their voices be silenced." In 2013, Dale Eisinger of Complex ranked Punk Prayer the 14th best work of performance art in history.

=== Protests and peripheral events ===
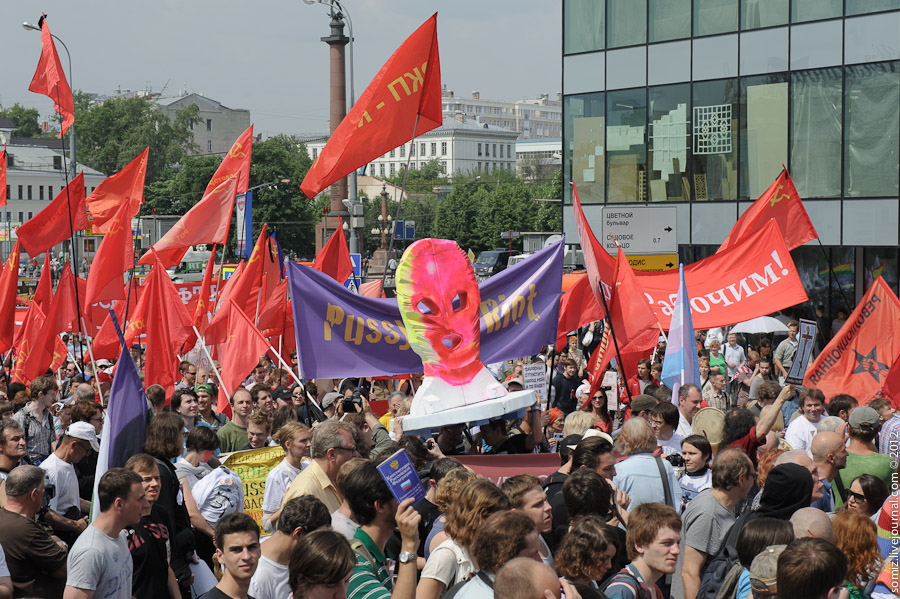
Protests in Moscow in June 2012

Protests were held around the world after the sentence was announced. Amnesty International declared August 17 "Pussy Riot Global Day" for activists. People gathered in New York City, where actress Chloë Sevigny, Karen Finley and others read statements by the convicted members of the band. In Bulgaria, people put masks, similar to those worn by Pussy Riot, on a Soviet sculpture. About 100 people protested outside the Russian consulate in Toronto. In Edinburgh, Scotland, Fringe performers read trial testimony. In Serbia, the far-right activist group Naši released a video game in which members of Pussy Riot were targets; the group spoke in support of the trio's imprisonment. Meanwhile, Estonian programmers launched an imitation of the Internet game "Angry Birds", poking fun at Russian authorities.

In Kyiv, Inna Shevchenko, a topless feminist activist from the group FEMEN, used a chainsaw to destroy a four-meter wooden sculpture of Christ on the cross, on a hill overlooking the city center. The cross had been erected during the Orange Revolution of 2004–2005, to commemorate victims of Stalin's repression. The desecration of the cross was repudiated by Maria Alyokhina of Pussy Riot, who said "Their surprise displays and protests against authoritarianism are similar to us, but we look at feminism differently, especially the form of speech. We wouldn't take our clothes off, and will not. Their latest action, the sawing of the cross, does not create a feeling of solidarity, unfortunately."

In August, at the Embassy of Russia in Washington, D.C. there was a protest and concert by punk bands. On August 19, two men and a woman dressed as Pussy Riot staged a protest during a service in Germany's Cologne Cathedral. The trio yelled slogans and held up a banner reading "Free Pussy Riot and all prisoners" in English. They were taken out by cathedral officials and then were charged with disturbing a religious service and breaching the peace. Kölner Stadt-Anzeiger, a local newspaper, reported that "disturbing a religious establishment" could result in a fine or up to three years imprisonment; they were eventually given suspended fines of 1200 Euros and 3 months probation. Assault charges were dropped. One of the three, identified as "Patrick H.", appealed his conviction and sentence; the court upheld his conviction and replaced his sentence with a fine of 150 Euros.

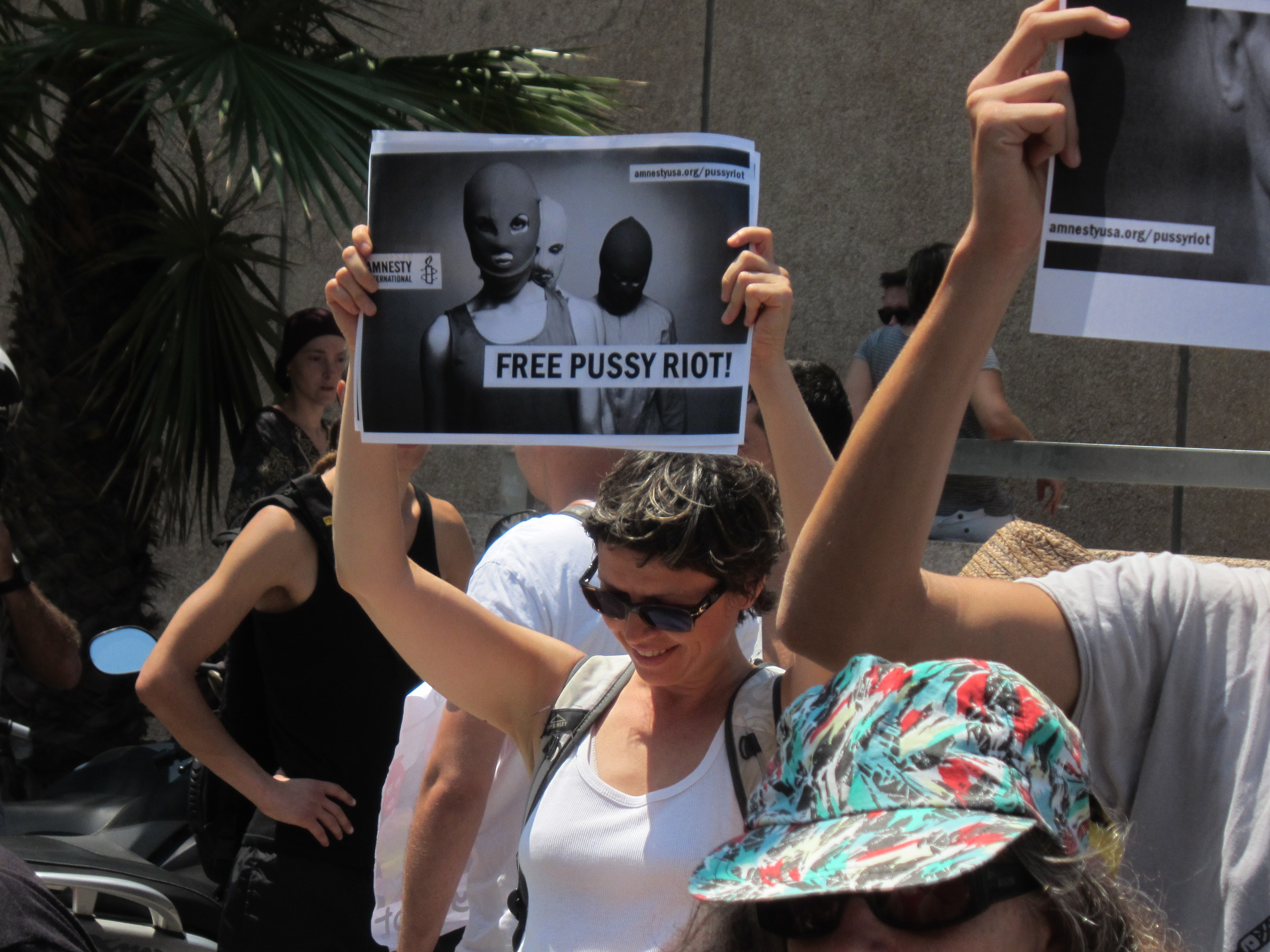
Protest in Tel Aviv, Israel in August 2012

Crosses were also cut down in at least four locations in Russia. A United Russia MP stated that the incidents were inspired by Pussy Riot, calling the actions "true Satanism". Conservative Orthodox activists staged counter-demonstrations, bursting into a pro-Pussy Riot event at a theatre, and shouting slogans such as "Repent", and "Why do you hate the Russian people?" An art museum curated by gallerists who had supported Pussy Riot was also invaded.

In early September 2012, unidentified vandals drew a "feminist caricature" of Saint Nino on Qvashveti Church in Tbilisi, Georgia, accompanied by the English-language words "Free Pussy Riot!" On September 16, Yuri Pyotrovsky, a 62-year-old St. Petersburg native residing in Germany, poured ink over an icon in the Cathedral of Christ the Savior in support of Pussy Riot. He was charged under the article of the Criminal Code for hooliganism.

On October 31, 2012, Comedy Central aired the South Park episode "A Scause for Applause", which ends with Jesus ripping open his robe to reveal the slogan "Free Pussy Riot". The episode explores the need for people to believe in a cause greater than themselves and our tendency to abandon good sense in support of these causes.

In August 2013, there was a Pussy Riot Solidarity Concert, outside the Russian Embassy in Washington, D.C.

As of 2022, the band was touring and demonstrating solidarity with Ukraine, with Tolokonnikova raising 6.7 million dollars for Ukrainian organization Come Back Alive. Tolokonnikova, Alyokhina and other members have made public statements in support of Ukraine.

=== Pussy Riot! A Punk Prayer for Freedom ===
External videos
- Panel discussion on Pussy Riot! A Punk Prayer for Freedom, February 7, 2013, C-SPAN

On September 21, 2012, the Feminist Press released an ebook entitled Pussy Riot! A Punk Prayer for Freedom compiling writings about the punk collective. The book is a compilation of the band's lyrics and poetry along with collected letters and material from the trial. Tributes by figures such as Yoko Ono, Eileen Myles, Johanna Fateman, Karen Finley, Justin Vivian Bond, and JD Samson are also included. The press collaborated closely with the band's members, and proceeds from the book's sales were given in support of Pussy Riot's legal defense. The book was released in print in February 2013. Containing statements from the October 10 appeal, the print version also includes new tributes by Bianca Jagger, Peaches & Simonne Jones, Tobi Vail, Barbara Browning, and Vivien Goldman.

=== Words Will Break Cement: The Passion of Pussy Riot ===
External videos
- Presentation by Gessen on Words Will Break Cement, March 12, 2014, C-SPAN

In 2014, Riverside Press published Words Will Break Cement: The Passion of Pussy Riot by Russian lesbian journalist Masha Gessen. Through interviews with the band members, their family members and friends, Gessen captured the biographies of Yekaterina Samutsevich, Maria Alyokhina, and Nadezhda Tolokonnikova and how they formed Pussy Riot. Gessen provided the historical, cultural, and political context for the band's protests, performances, and music, and also covered their arrest and jail time.

=== Documentary films ===
In January 2013, a film on the Pussy Riot case was released by British documentary film making company Roast Beef Productions. The working title was Show Trial: The Story of Pussy Riot; subsequently it was released as Pussy Riot: A Punk Prayer. It was directed by Mike Lerner and Maksim Pozdorovkin, and featured publicly available footage of the court proceedings and interviews with the families of the band members, but no interviews with the band members themselves. It debuted at the 2013 Sundance film festival, after which Pussy Riot's Yekaterina Samutsevich fielded questions from the audience via Skype. Among other things she reiterated that she had no intention of turning Pussy Riot into a commercial venture. The film won a World Cinema Documentary Special Jury Award for "Punk Spirit" at the festival. The HBO network subsequently bought the U.S. television rights to the film despite lukewarm critical reviews. The BBC showed the film in October 2013; the British newspaper reviews were favourable. The film was among 15 documentaries short listed for a 2014 Academy Award, however it did not make the final list of nominees.

Pussy versus Putin was a 2013 documentary film chronicling the history of the group, directed by the Russian film collective, Gogol's Wives. The film received the NTR IDFA Award for Best Mid-Length Documentary at the 2013 International Documentary Film Festival Amsterdam.

In a TED Talk, member Nadya Tolokonnikova describes that they "did it in response to Putin's announcement that he wants to rule Russia. [She] felt it deep inside that Putin equals death, medieval torture, [a] knife in the back, and stagnation... new Dark ages for Russia"

=== MediaZona ===
In 2014, Nadya Tolokonnikova and Pyotr Verzilov founded MediaZona, an independent Russian news website that focuses on abuses and corruption in the criminal justice system.
