= Alek Epstein =

Russian-Israeli sociologist (born 1975)

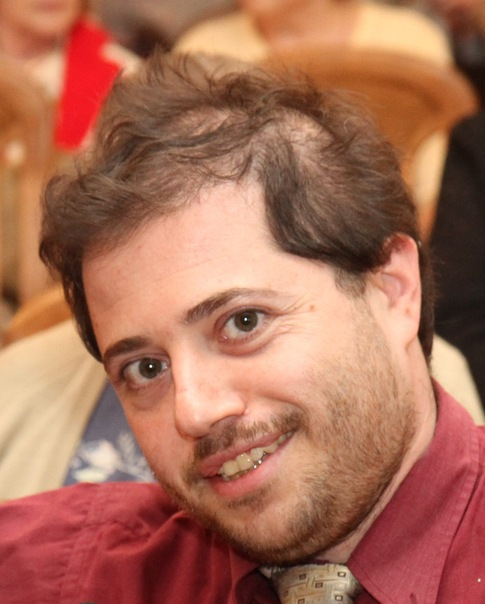

Alek D. Epstein (Hebrew: אלק ד' אפשטיין; born April 18, 1975) is a Russian-Israeli sociologist of culture and politics. He divides his time between Jerusalem and Moscow, taking part in a number of academic, educational, social change, and civil rights activism projects in both countries. He has published more than 200 manuscripts in various scientific journals and collections and authored more than 20 books on Israel and the Middle East.

== Biography ==
Alek Davidovich Epstein graduated from the Hebrew University of Jerusalem in 1995, and obtained his PhD in 2001. His M.A. and Ph.D. dissertations were supervised by Martin van Creveld and Baruch Kimmerling. From 1999 till 2012 he was affiliated with the Department of Sociology, Political Science and Communication, Open University of Israel. His professional experience includes courses taught at the Department of Sociology, Rothberg International School and Chais Center at the Hebrew University of Jerusalem and at the School of Communication and Journalism at the College of Management, Tel-Aviv. During twelve years (from 1999 till 2010) he served as an adjunct professor of sociology of Israel at the Department of Jewish Studies, Institute of Asian and African Countries, Moscow State University. In 2009 he joined the faculty of the Russian-British postgraduate program at the Department of Sociology and Political Science at the Moscow School of Social and Economic Sciences, where he taught during two academic years.

As a former coordinator for academic cooperation at the Chais program in Jewish and Israel studies in Russian at the Open University of Israel, Epstein pushed forward contacts with various top-ranked Russian universities. From 2006 till 2008 agreements were signed with the Moscow State Institute of International Relations (MGIMO); State University of Nizhniy Novgorod; Ural State University (Ekaterinburg); National Research Tomsk State University; Center of International Studies of Kazan State University. Alek D. Epstein lectured in all of these universities; his articles were published in various journals and collections issued by each of the five abovementioned institutes of higher education.

He has always been particularly concerned with the issues of Russian history, culture and social life both professionally and personally. He describes himself as a humanist, a cosmopolitan and a social democrat. As a convinced atheist, he speaks out for the human rights, for national, ethnic and gender equality, for the recognition of same-sex marriages including the child adoption by same-sex partners, for the protection of the environment and the development of the ecologically-oriented thinking, for the decrease of the number of prisoners. He strongly opposes the ideas of capital penalty, militarism, xenophobia and the concept of a strong nation-state.

In November 2012 he initiated the creation of An Alternative Prize for the Russian Activist Art and became the chairperson of its jury. The laureates included Matvey Krylov, Artem Loskutov, Maria Kiseleva and Pussy Riot group and others. The ceremony was organized as part of the Media Impact Assembly at the Zverev Center for Contemporary art on December 4, 2012.

== Grants and awards ==
Epstein has been awarded Theodor Herzl scholarship and research grants from the Bernard Cherrick Center for the Study of Zionism and the History of Israel; Minerva Center for Human Rights (twice); Leslie and Vera Keller Foundation for the Enhancement of the Jewish Heritage; Lavon Institute for the History of the Israeli Labor Movement; Shaine Center for Research in Social Sciences; David Asseo Foundation and the Open University of Israel. He is listed in 2000 Outstanding Intellectuals of the 21st Century (2008) and Who's Who in the World (2009).

== Research ==
His Ph.D. dissertation was dedicated to the study of "The Involvement of the Academic Community in the Public Discourse on the Formation of the Israeli Political Culture in the Period of Labor Movement Hegemony". Later he served as a principal researcher in the study on the development of sociology of the Israeli society as a research field; in the study of the inter-cultural dialogue between scientists and teachers from the former USSR and their Israeli colleagues; etc.

An expert in Israeli history and politics, as well as in the history of the Arab-Israeli conflict, he has written extensively on intellectuals' influence on the emergence of civil society, on the development of conscientious disobedience as an indicator of the changing patterns of civil–military relations, on the development of Israel studies as a research field in various countries, on the emergence of the Palestinian refugee problem and unsuccessful attempts to solve it, on various aspects of immigrant scientists' and teachers' professional and social integration in Israel, on bilateral relations between Israel and Russia, Middle Eastern peace initiatives and on several additional topics.

== Works on Israel and the Arab-Israeli conflict ==
Epstein has published 150 articles in such scientific journals as Journal of Human Rights; Terrorism and Political Violence; International Studies in the Sociology of Education; Journal of Educational Administration and History; New Global Development: Journal of International and Comparative Social Welfare; Language in Society; Language Problems and Language Planning; Journal of Multilingual and Multicultural Development; Journal of International Migration and Integration; Tourism, Culture and Communication, as well as Jewish Political Science Review; Journal of Israeli History; Israeli Sociology and others, among them journals, published by Russian and Ukrainian Academies of Sciences.

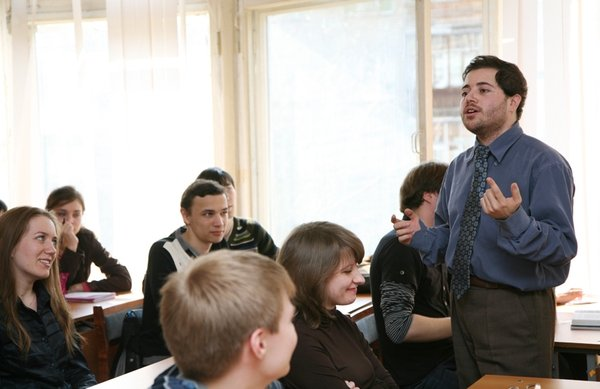
In Ural State University (2008 year)

Epstein authored fourteen books, published in Russian, among them: Wars and Diplomacy. Arab–Israeli Conflict in the 20th Century (Kyiv and Moscow, 2003), Israel and the Palestinian Refugee Problem: History and Politics (Moscow, 2005), Israel in the Era of "Post-Zionism": Academy, Ideology and Politics (Moscow, 2006), After the Collapse of the "Road Map": The Attempts to Mitigate the Israeli–Palestinian Conflict (Moscow, 2006), Israel's War Against Hezbollah and Its Impact on the Middle Eastern Politics (Moscow, 2006), Confronting HAMAS: Israel, Jordan and PNA Face to Face with Islamic Fundamentalism (Moscow, 2007), Diplomatic Struggle over Jerusalem. An Offstage History (Moscow/Jerusalem, 2008), Israel and (Non) Administered Territories: Between Annexation and Withdrawal (Moscow/Jerusalem, 2008), Israel's Policy of Targeted Killing: Politics, Law and Ethics (Moscow, 2009), Israelis and Palestinians: From Confrontation to Negotiations and Back (Moscow/Jerusalem, 2009), The Black Years. Soviet Jewry between Hitler and Stalin, 1939–1953 (together with Kiril Feferman, Raanana, Israel, 2010), The Rise and the Decline of the Israeli Left (Moscow, 2011), Russia and Israel: A Difficult Journey (together with Stanislav Kozheurov, Moscow/Jerusalem, 2011), The Revitalization of the Jewish Statehood and the Unresolved Jewish Dilemma (Kyiv, 2011), To Free the Hostages by Any Means Necessary: Israel's Negotiations with Palestinian and Lebanese Guerrilla Organizations (together with Evgeni Varshaver, Moscow, 2012) and Close Allies? United States and Israel: The Hidden History (2 vols., Moscow/Jerusalem, 2014). His books Political and Ethnic Cleansings in the USSR, 1918–1953 (Raanana, Israel, 2007) and Russian-Speaking Israelis at 'Home' and 'Abroad': Identity and Migration (together with Zeev Khanin and Marina Niznik, Jerusalem – Ramat-Gan, 2011) were published in Hebrew.

He has contributed to and edited twelve volumes in various languages, among them Mass Migration and Its Impact on the Israeli Society (Moscow, 2000); Contemporary Israel: Politics and Society (Moscow/Jerusalem, 2002); The Zionist Imperative: An Anthology of Contemporary Thinking (Moscow/Jerusalem, 2003); The Palestine-Israeli Conflict in the Mirror of Public Opinion and International Diplomacy (Moscow, 2004); The Post-Soviet Jewry: Identity and Education (Jerusalem, 2008); The Jewish State at the Beginning of the 21st Century. An Anthology of Contemporary Israeli Social and Political Thought (Moscow/Jerusalem, 2008) – in Russian; National Priorities: Immigration and Integration in Israel in the Beginning of the 21st Century (Jerusalem, 2007) – in Hebrew; Every Seventh Israeli: The Jews of the Former Soviet Union – Patterns of Social and Cultural Integration (Jerusalem, 2007); Constructing the National Identity: Jewish Education in Russia Twenty Years after the End of the Cold War (Jerusalem, 2008); and Immigrant Scientists in Israel: Achievements and Challenges of Integration in Comparative Context (Jerusalem, 2010) – in English.

In addition, he has edited the Russian versions of the Open University's courses Israel: The First Decade of Independence (Part I. "The Founding of Israeli Democracy", 4 volumes, 2001; Part II. "Society, Economics and Culture", 4 volumes, 2002–2003), From National Home to a State in the Making: The Jewish Community in Palestine between the World Wars (2 vols., 2006), Democracy and National Security in Israel (3 vols., 2007–2009) and Search for Identity Between Assimilation and Immigration: Russian Jewry in the Twentieth Century (2 vols., 2007–2008).

== Works on Russian civic activism and the protest art ==
In June 2011, the Moscow-based publishing house Gileya headed by Sergey Kudryavtsev published the book The Thought Police: Authorities, Experts and Anti-Extremism Campaign in Contemporary Russia, co-authored by Alek Epstein and Oleg Vasiliev. The presentation of the book featured speeches by Alexander Verkhovsky, Vsevolod Yemelin, Boris Stomakhin and others, and the Kasparov.ru portal published an extensive interview with the authors.

In June 2012 the Free Marxist Publishing House headed by Kirill Medvedev published the follow-up book entitled Defending the Authorities against Criticism from Society: Ten Years of Anti-Extremism Campaign in Contemporary Russia (it also included articles by the philosophers Ilya Budraitskis and Aleksey Penzin who participated in the presentation that was organized as part of the VII Moscow International Book Festival in the Central House of Artists).

In March 2012 the Moscow-based Umlaut Network publishing house issued Alek Epstein's book Total 'War': Art Activism in the Age of Tandemocracy, a social and political analysis of the phenomenon of the "Voina" art-group throughout the five years of its existence starting with its first appearance in February, 2007. Fragments of this research were published in two issues of the NZ: Debates on Politics and Culture journal in the fall of 2011. The presentation of the book that took place in the Vinzavod Center for Contemporary Art was highlighted by speeches by Andrey Erofeev, Yury Samodurov, Peter Verzilov, Anton Nikolaev and others, and detailed interviews with the author were published by such Internet portals as Around Art – Contemporary Art and Art-Chronicle, as well as by the Radio Free Europe. It was named among the best books of the week by Kommersant and Moscow News newspapers as well as by the Russian Reporter weekly.

In the late July 2012, on the eve of the trial of Pussy Riot (Nadezhda Tolokonnikova, Yekaterina Samutsevich and Maria Alyokhina), the publisher Viktor Bondarenko and Kolonna publications released the book entitled Art on the Barricades: 'Pussy Riot', the 'Bus Exhibition' and the Protest Art Activism, edited by Alek D. Epstein. Along with the extensive preface (its fragments were published in two issues of the NZ: Debates on Politics and Culture journal) the album also includes over a hundred photos of actions and works of art created by Victoria Lomasko, Anton Nikolaev, Lena Hades, Aleskey Knedlyakovsky, Lusine Dzhanyan, Evgenia Maltceva, Leonid Danilov, Vladimir Kozin, Oleg Khvostov, Victor Bogorad and other contemporary Russian artists. This art book was designed by Galina Bleikh. Extensive interviews with Alek D. Epstein concerning the book were published on the portals of Radio Free Europe, Gazeta.ru and Be In, a fragment of the album was published on the Artguide website and numerous comments appeared on such websites as Art-Chronicle, Grani.ru, Noart Gallery, ZHIR project and others. The album was named one of the most important art books of the summer of 2012 by Art-Chronicle and "TimeOut Moscow" journals.

In late September 2012 the Russia for all foundation and the Kolonna publications issued the album entitled Victor Bondarenko and Evgeniya Maltceva's Project 'Spiritual Combat' and the Struggle for the Christian Sacred Images' New Life in Art, authored by Alek D. Epstein. The unique material, as well as different versions of the works by Evgenia Maltceva exhibited at the Vinzavod Center for Contemporary Art in September 2012, published for the very first time, makes this book a valuable historical record of one of the most resonant art exhibitions that took place in Moscow in the past few years. The book was designed by Galina Bleikh. The speakers at the presentation included Victor Bondarenko, Marat Gelman, Roman Bagdasarov and others, while an extensive interview with the author was published on the website of the Radio Free Europe.

== Scientific conferences ==
Epstein was an organizer and co-chairperson of the International conference "Contemporary Israel: Politics, Culture and Society" that took place at the Moscow Institute of Israeli and Middle Eastern Studies and Moscow State University on September 8–11, 2000. This conference was the first one in the Russian academic history that was fully dedicated to the study of Israeli society. Later he chaired sessions on the history of Zionism and Israel at the 13th, 14th, 15th and 16th Annual International Interdisciplinary Conferences on Jewish Studies (Moscow, 2006–2009). He presented his pieces of research at the 34th, 36th and 37th World Congresses of the International Institute of Sociology (IIS) (Tel-Aviv, Israel, 1999; Beijing, China, 2004; Stockholm, Sweden, 2005), at the 7th and 10th Conferences of the International Society for the Study of the European Ideas (Bergen, Norway, 2000; University of Malta, 2006), at the 25th and 31st Scientific Conferences of the International Society of Political Psychology (Berlin, 2002; Paris, 2008), at the International Political Science Association Conference on "Nationalism and National Security" (Ben-Gurion University of the Negev, Israel, 1999), at the 9th and 10th Bi-Annual Conferences of the International Society for the Intellectual History (London, 2007; Verona, 2009), at the 3rd International Conference on "Intellectuals, Intelligentsia and Society" (Moscow State University, 1999), at the 3rd, 4th and 5th Annual Conferences of the World Public Forum "Dialogue of Civilizations" (Rhodes, Greece, 2005, 2006 and 2007), at the Association for the Study of Nationalities conference "Twenty Years Later (1991–2011): The Reshaping of Space and Identity" (Moscow, 2011) and various thematic conferences. He has appeared on many TV and radio programs and his articles have been published in the Russian and Jewish press in various countries.
