= Pussy Versus Putin =

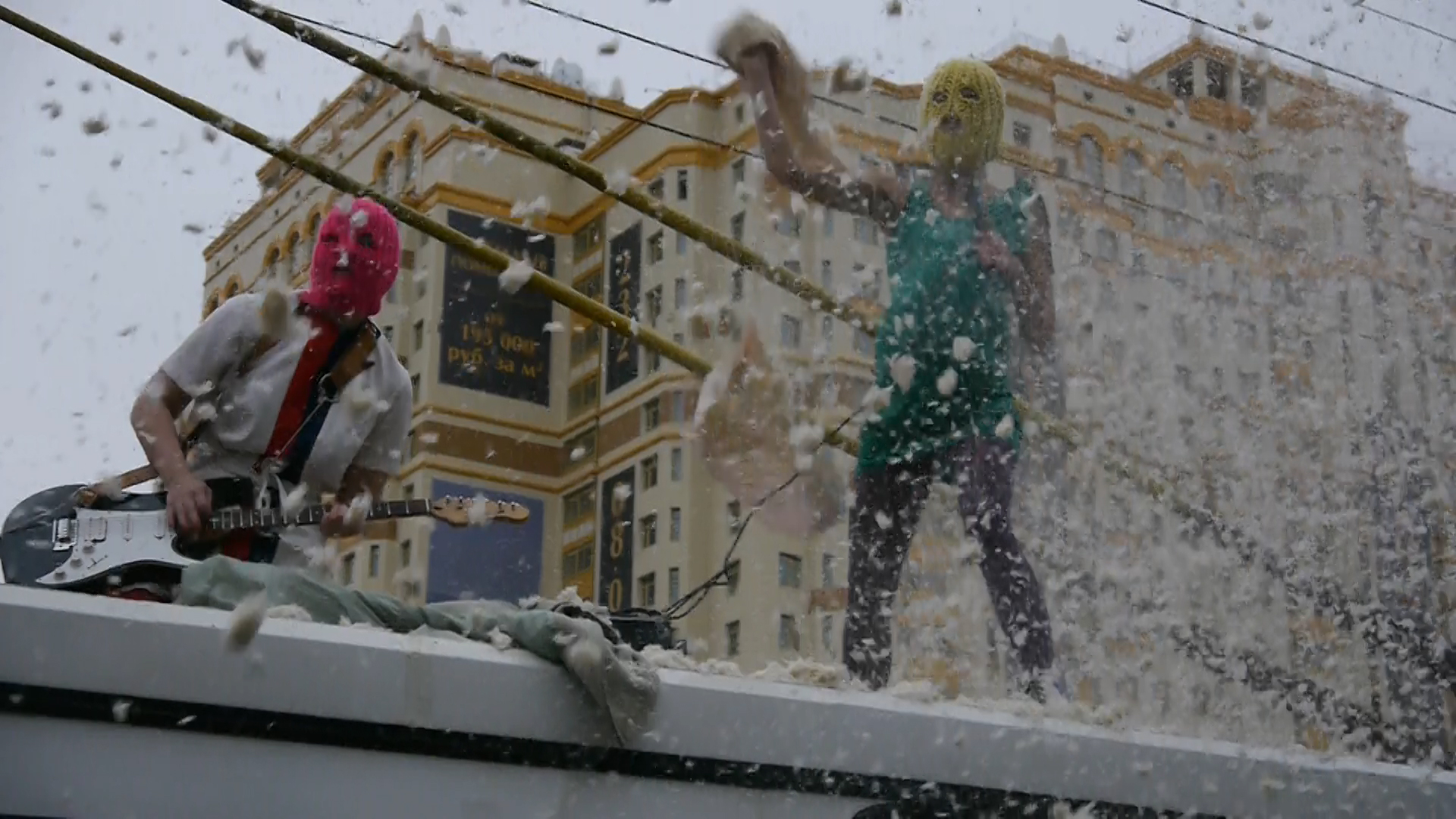
- Still frame of Pussy Riot performance on the trolleybus roof in Moscow
- Russian: Pussy protiv Putina
- Directed by: Taisiya Krugovykh, Vasily Bogatov
- Written by: Taisiya Krugovykh, Vasily Bogatov
- Produced by: Gogol's Wives Production; Ilya Zaslavskiy (Associate Producer, Free Speech LLC)
- Starring: Nadezhda Tolokonnikova; Maria Alyokhina; Yekaterina Samutsevich; Pyotr Verzilov; Vladimir Putin; Andrew Tolokonnikov
- Cinematography: Taisiya Krugovykh, Vasily Bogatov
- Edited by: Taisiya Krugovykh, Vasily Bogatov
- Release date: November 2013 (IDFA)
- Running time: 63 minutes
- Country: Russia
- Language: Russian

Pussy versus Putin is a 2013 Russian documentary film by the film collective Gogol's Wives chronicling the history of the group Pussy Riot and their struggle with the political regime in Russia. The film received the NTR IDFA Award for Best Mid-Length Documentary at the 2013 International Documentary Film Festival Amsterdam.

The one-hour film includes sequences in which group members discuss their political aims, footage of their guerrilla-style performances during the run-up to the 2012 Russian presidential election as well as the intimidation and physical harassment they face, shot from behind bars and inside prison vans.

== See also ==
- Pussy Riot: A Punk Prayer, another 2013 documentary about Pussy Riot
