= Voice Project (non-profit) =

Advocacy group

The Voice Project
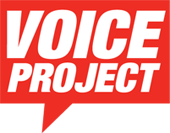
- Founded: 2009 by Hunter Heaney in Uganda
- Type: Non-profit; NGO
- Location(s): Global; Headquarters in New York City
- Services: Protecting Free Expression Through Advocacy Campaigns, Legal Aid, Fiscal Sponsorship
- Fields: Human Rights, Free Speech, Free Expression, Musical Advocacy
- Website: www.voiceproject.org

The Voice Project is a 501(c)(3) non-profit advocacy group focused on promoting freedom of artistic expression as an agent of social change. The project was founded in 2009 as a response to the Lord's Resistance Army Insurgency in Northern Uganda, but has since expanded programs into Sudan, the Democratic Republic of the Congo, the Central African Republic, Russia, China, Afghanistan, Cuba, and the United States.

== Background ==
The Voice Project works to defend the right of freedom of expression by advocating for artists who use their work as an agent of social change. The organization was founded in Uganda in 2009, having built radio stations and produced broadcast content in support of local singers who were using their songs to encourage combatants to return home from war in that country. The Voice Project has since worked to provide advocacy and legal aid for imprisoned artists as well as fiscal sponsorship and other support to activist-artists who use their artistic work as an agent for social change. In addition to its actions as an advocacy group, The Voice Project serves as a news source for updates in the field of freedom of expression.

== Work ==
=== Central Africa ===
Founded in 2009, The Voice Project was inspired by women's groups in Northern Uganda who have used songs passed by word of mouth and on the radio to let children and soldiers who have been abducted and forced to fight in Joseph Kony's Lord's Resistance Army (LRA) know that they are forgiven for the atrocities they were forced to commit and are welcome home. The project was started by Hunter Heaney who in the fall of 2008 was volunteering at an IDP (Internally Displaced Persons) camp in Agoro, a small village in northern Uganda's war-torn Kitgum District when he first heard the "dwog paco" ("come home") songs. Upon returning to the United States, Heaney and friends Anna Gabriel (daughter of Peter Gabriel) and Chris Holmes (Ashtar Command) co-founded the organization, enlisting friends and musicians from around the world and having them pass participation from one to another by word of mouth and through music by covering another artist's song in "cover chains." According to Rolling Stone, "To bring awareness to the problems of LRA violence plaguing Northern Uganda, Southern Sudan, Eastern Congo and Central African Republic, the Voice Project has recruited a number of artists to play a game of musical tag." Each performance is video recorded and shown on The Voice Project's website as well as distributed through social media platforms such as Facebook and Twitter. Participants have included indie rock acts such as Edward Sharpe and the Magnetic Zeros, Andrew Bird, Dawes, and Joe Purdy as well as international recording artists such as Peter Gabriel, Billy Bragg, Mike Mills (R.E.M.), Angélique Kidjo and former child soldier Emmanuel Jal.

In 2012 it was reported that The Voice Project had been working with the United Nations to build FM radio stations, produce music content, and record family members and ex-combatants in their native Luo languages encouraging LRA escapes and defections and encouraging former combatants to return home, and that between 2010 and 2012 more than 100 soldiers had escaped or defected from the LRA with many returnees claiming that the radio broadcasts were the main factor in their decision to do so.

The musicians participating in Amplify Peace are as follows(in alphabetical order):

• Akello Miriam • Andrew Bird • Angélique Kidjo • Babaluku (Bataka Squad) • Bajah + Dry Eye Crew • Bedouin Soundclash • Billy Bragg • Brett Dennen • Chloe Chaidez (Kitten) • Dawes • Edward Sharpe and the Magnetic Zeros • Emmanuel Jal • Garrison Starr • Gary Go • Greg Laswell • Har Mar Superstar (Sean Na Na) • Joan Wasser (Joan As Police Woman) • JBM • Jesca Hoop • Joe Purdy • Joey Ryan • John McCauley (Deer Tick) • Joseph Arthur • Kenneth Pattengale • Koji • Maria Taylor (Azure Ray) • Matt Vasquez (Delta Spirit) • Mike Mills (R.E.M.) • Naked Hearts • O+S • Parts & Labor • Peter Gabriel • Priscilla Ahn • SoKo • Steel Train • The Black Swan Effect • The Gulu Widows Choir • The Moor • The Shivers • The Submarines • Tom Freund

=== Russia ===
==== Pussy Riot Support Fund ====
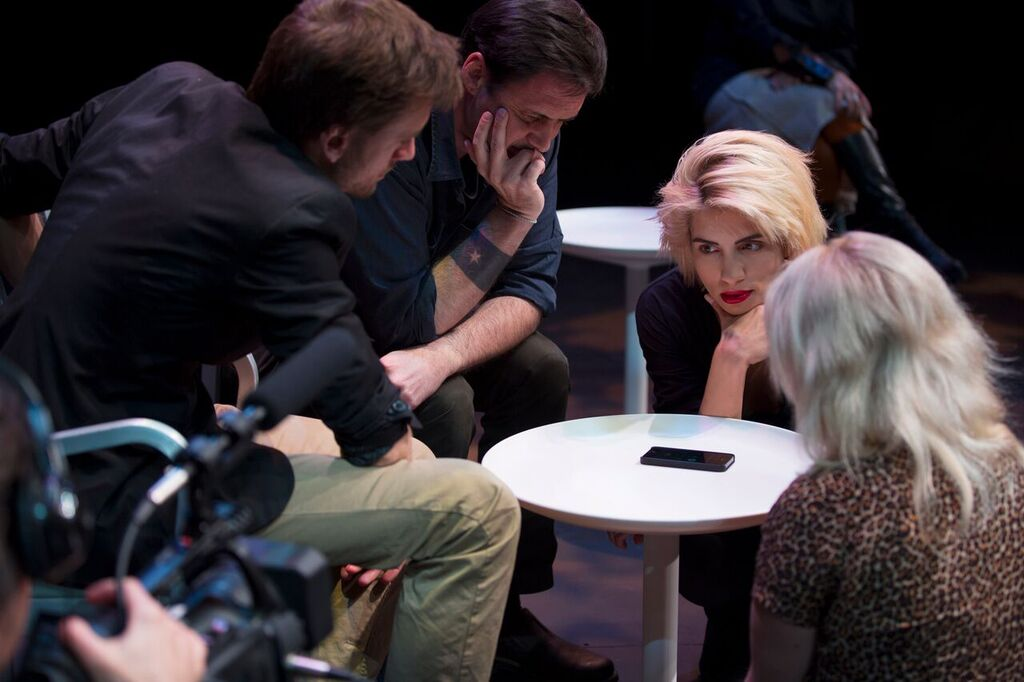
The Voice Project's Hunter Heaney here with Pussy Riot's Nadya Tolokonnikova and Masha Alekhina, using a press conference to call artist Tania Bruguera, who was being detained in Cuba. May 2015.

From 2012 to 2014, The Voice Project coordinated international donations through an international legal defense and support fund for Nadezhda Tolokonnikova and Maria Alyokhina of Pussy Riot during their imprisonment in Russian corrective labor colonies, which supported the women's legal expenses, supplied them with provisions while in the prison camps and child care, in addition to safety monitoring by local Russian lawyers. As of January 1, 2014, The Voice Project reported that the fund had raised over US$120,000 in support of Tolokonnikova and Alyokhina, the majority of which (US$94,000) went to support efforts such as hiring local monitoring attorneys, food, clothing and supplies for the women and care for their children via their families, with the rest supporting other Pussy Riot members (US$16,000) and legal defense efforts ($10,000).

==== Zona Prava and MediaZona ====
In 2014, though the support fund itself had closed with the release of Tolokonnikova and Alyokhina, The Voice Project continued in its work with the women promoting human rights, notably by coordinating their first visit to the United States in February 2014, and the arrangement of the New York human rights gala which marked it. In 2014 The Voice Project formed a partnership with Tolokonnikova and Alekhina's newly formed prisoners' rights NGO, Zona Prava, to provide donations-processing and administrative support. The Voice Project's partnership with Zona Prava has continued through its fiscal sponsorship of the organization's US activities, and coordination, participation, and partnership in events such as the Tolokonnikova and Alyokhina's September 2014 panel at Harvard University and subsequent meeting with philosopher and activist Noam Chomsky.

On May 7, 2015, The Voice Project, Zona Prava, and SITE Santa Fe made a surprise phone call to detained Cuban activist-artist Tania Bruguera following an event hosted by SITE and the Santa Fe University of Art and Design. During the phone call Tolokonnikova and Alyokhina made a public declaration of their solidarity with Bruguera and stated that they would be working together going forward to address the issues facing each of their groups.

=== Afghanistan ===
In 2012, The Voice Project worked in partnership with Los Angeles-born Afghan-American filmmaker and musician Ariana Delawari in Kabul, sponsoring her appearance at the 2012 TEDx Kabul conference and her appearance at the Sound Central music festival, the first of its kind in post-Communist Afghanistan, as such performances were outlawed under the Taliban and other Afghan regimes. Delawari began working with The Voice Project when she traveled to Uganda in order to aid with documenting and filming the Amplify Peace campaign, and it is in Uganda that The Voice Project began to support her work in Afghanistan. The main goal shared by The Voice Project, Delawari, and the Sound Central and TEDx Kabul programs has been the creation of a safe and flourishing environment for expression and the arts in Central Asia.

=== United States ===
==== Solidarity Wisconsin ====
Beginning with the 2011 Wisconsin protests over collective bargaining rights, the Solidarity Sing Along has been a continued gathering in the Wisconsin State Capitol building and grounds for three years. In December 2011, the state government began requiring permits for demonstrations by groups of four or more in the State Capitol, and began arresting, issuing tickets to, and prosecuting protestors, including the Solidarity Singers. In March 2014, Isthmus, through its Daily Page website, reported on The Voice Project's Solidarity Wisconsin campaign in support of the Solidarity Singers, calling for the dismissal of the charges brought against the singers, raising the topic on social media, and petitioning Attorney General J. B. Van Hollen to stop the continued prosecution of the singers.

A video produced by The Voice Project in 2014 brought increased attention to the cases outside Wisconsin, much of which resulted from the declaration of solidarity from Pussy Riot members Nadezhda Tolokonnikova and Maria Alyokhina, who had previously worked with The Voice Project, with the demonstrations in the capitol. The Capital Times newspaper, based in Madison, reported on The Voice Project's activism in advocating for demonstration rights in Wisconsin, framed through the context of more familiar human rights abuses in Russia and elsewhere. As of March 19, 2014, Dane County Judge John Markson has dismissed 29 tickets based on his ruling in State of Wisconsin v. Michael W. Crute, No. 13FO2108 (1st Cir. February 5, 2014), which found that the permit law was against the State Constitution but the Department of Justice had issued an appeal. On January 29, 2015, the Wisconsin Fourth District Court of Appeals dismissed all of the approximately 400 cases brought against the Solidarity Singers, upholding the lower court's ruling. The Voice Project has continued to advocate for the free expression and assembly of the protestors who continue in the Solidarity Sing Along.

==== Cecily McMillan ====
In 2014, The Voice Project spearheaded a letter-writing campaign in support of Occupy Wall Street activist Cecily McMillan, who was tried and subsequently convicted of assault on a plainclothes police officer, which she claimed was in self-defense from sexual assault. A majority of the jurors who convicted McMillan argued that she should not receive a prison sentence, as she faced a potential seven-year sentence. In response to McMillan's harsh potential sentence, The Voice Project conducted a campaign, encouraging supporters to write letters petitioning for leniency to Judge Ronald Zweibel, who was overseeing the trial. The campaign collected letters from the general public, as well as numerous artists including Shepard Fairey, Kim Gordon, Spike Jonze, JD Samson, Lauren Mayberry, Justin Vivian Bond, and Nadezhda Tolokonnikova.

=== Tibet ===
In 2014 the Voice Project spearheaded two letter-writing campaigns to the Chinese government, regarding the treatment and detention of activists in Tibet, calling for the release of activist artists and an end to the governmental crackdown on voices of dissent. One campaign specifically focused on Gebey, a Tibetan singer arrested after a May 24, 2014, concert in which he sang songs promoting use of the Tibetan language. While Gebey was released in June 2014, the campaign in support of the other 10 detained artists is ongoing.

=== Hong Kong ===
In November 2014, The Voice Project was reported to have partnered with Hong Kong art collective Stand By You: Add Oil Machine and activist organization Human Rights in China in the Stand By You 2.0 campaign, which featured the projection of messages from supporters around the world onto the Lennon Wall in Downtown Hong Kong, the operational center of the 2014 Hong Kong protests. The images projected included messages from Peter Gabriel, Pussy Riot, and Iron & Wine in a stated mission for the organizations and supporters to "show [protestors] that we still stand with them, and to help counteract propaganda that they don't have support out there." Photographs of the supporters holding umbrellas, namesake and common symbol of the Umbrella Movement, appeared bearing messages of their solidarity as captions in both English and Chinese.

=== Cuba ===
In January 2015, The Voice Project launched an advocacy campaign in support of the Cuban American artist Tania Bruguera, who was arrested by Cuban government authorities ahead of her planned December 30, 2014, performance art piece "Yo También Exijo" (I Also Demand) which consisted of an open microphone in Havana's Plaza de la Revolución, inviting Cubans to openly share their thoughts on the state of the country. While Bruguera was released, the government has kept her under surveillance while building charges against her, with an extended detention barring her from leaving. In response, The Voice Project launched a campaign in which activists wrote letters to Cuban president Raúl Castro and Minister of Justice María Esther Reus González, "strongly urging [the government] to unconditionally drop the case against this artist." The Voice Project has continued to work with Bruguera and the Yo También Exijo platform to support the artist through advocacy as her case proceeds, as well as facilitating collaboration between Bruguera and the other artists supported by the group.
