= Police State (performance) =

Performance and installation artwork by Nadya Tolokonnikova

- Artist: Nadya Tolokonnikova
- Year: 2025
- Medium: Durational performance, installation
- Location: Geffen Contemporary at MOCA Los Angeles; Museum of Contemporary Art Chicago

Police State is a 2025 durational performance and installation by Icelandic-Russian artist and activist Nadya Tolokonnikova. The work consists of a reconstructed prison environment that the artist inhabits as a live performance. It premiered at the Geffen Contemporary at MOCA Los Angeles and was disrupted by nearby ICE raids and subsequent protests. It was later presented at the Museum of Contemporary Art Chicago. The exhibition received extensive critical coverage and was listed by ARTnews as one of the most defining artworks of 2025.

== Background ==
Tolokonnikova developed Police State in response to her imprisonment following the 2012 Pussy Riot protest in Moscow's Cathedral of Christ the Savior. The Guardian described the work as a reconstruction of the “carceral world” the artist experienced, used to examine state repression and authoritarian power.

Tolokonnikova designed the installation as an endurance-based performance involving repetitive labor, including sewing, inside a confined architectural structure modeled after her experience in Russian penal colonies.

== Description ==
The installation consists of an enclosed prison cell furnished with a bed, toilet, table, and sewing machine, elements drawn from Tolokonnikova's experience of incarceration. Artnet News noted that the work incorporates prison soundscapes, surveillance structures, and artworks by political prisoners invited by Tolokonnikova, including Oleg Navalny, brother of the late Alexei Navalny, and Sasha Skochilenko.

Visitors encounter the piece through narrow viewing slits and restricted sightlines, echoing the visual hierarchy of surveillance. The New York Times described Tolokonnikova's performance inside the cell as “physically taxing and psychologically unrelenting.”

== Exhibitions ==
=== MOCA Los Angeles (2025) ===
Police State premiered at the Geffen Contemporary at MOCA in May 2025. The presentation was Tolokonnikova's largest institutional installation to date. The Art Newspaper characterized the work as a hybrid of performance, activism, and sculptural installation.

During the MOCA run, the performance was interrupted by National Guard activity related to nearby immigration raids and protests. On June 9, the Guard deployed beside the museum, prompting MOCA to close and postpone the performance. Reports noted that the presence of armed troops and crowd-control weapons made the exhibition's themes feel immediate rather than representational. As Artforum wrote, the event caused the work “to move from an aesthetic experience to a lived one.”

=== MCA Chicago (2025) ===
The installation was shown at the Museum of Contemporary Art Chicago in November 2025. During the Chicago run, Tolokonnikova was informed mid-performance that Russia's Ministry of Justice had moved to classify Pussy Riot as an extremist organization.

== Reception ==
ARTnews ranked Police State number six on its list of the most defining artworks of 2025, citing its scale and political immediacy.

Many critics noted the unintended immediacy of the protests happening outside the museum. The Guardian called the exhibition “uncompromising” and “emotionally confrontational” in its portrayal of state violence.

Artnet described the MOCA presentation as one of the institution's most politically urgent exhibitions of the year.

The New York Times characterized the performance's endurance component as physically and psychologically demanding.

Artnet News noted that the extremist designation of Pussy Riot during the MCA run intensified the work's political resonance.
