= Zvi Goldstein =

Israeli visual artist (born 1947)

- צבי גולדשטיין
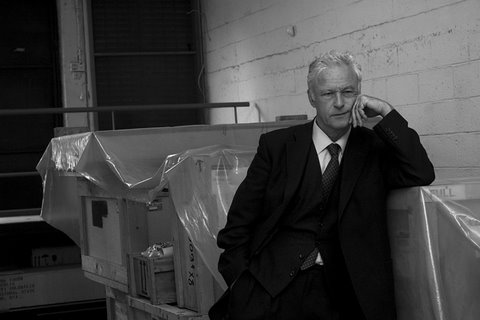
- Portrait of Zvi Goldstein by Tal Rosen
- Born: January 21, 1947 (age 79); Cluj, Romania
- Education: Bezalel Academy of Arts and Design, Brera Academy
- Occupations: Visual artist, teacher
- Spouse: Rachel Bitran (m. 1973–)

Zvi Goldstein (Hebrew: צבי גולדשטיין; born January 21, 1947) is a Romanian-born Israeli visual artist and teacher. He lives in Jerusalem, and has taught at the Bezalel Academy of Arts and Design.

== Early life and education ==
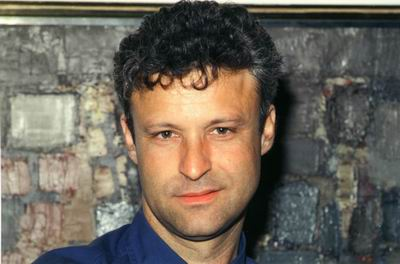
Zvi Goldstein

Goldstein was born to Hungarian Jewish parents in 1947 in Cluj, Romania. He is the only son of Szigmund Goldstein (born 30 August 1917), a taxi driver, and Margaret Golstein (born 2 February 1919). His father survived Mauthausen concentration camp and returned to Cluj, where he met his future wife, an Auschwitz concentration camp survivor. Golstein spent his early childhood in Cluj and often went hiking with his father in the Carpathian Mountains. He attended elementary school, during which he suffered numerous antisemitic attacks at and after school.

In 1958 he and his parents emigrated to Kiryat Gat, Israel, with the help of the American Jewish Joint Distribution Committee. In 1962 he left school after tenth grade, and between 1962 and 1963 he worked at Polgat Textiles in Kiryat Gat. In 1963 Goldstein applied for the Bezalel Academy of Arts and Design in Jerusalem but was rejected. In 1964 he tried again and was accepted, and he began his studies in the graphic department as the youngest student in his class.

In November 1964, Goldstein had to interrupt his studies at the Academy to fulfill his mandatory military service. He served in the Israeli army for two years and four months. In January 1967, towards the end of his military service, he was allowed to return to the Bezalel Academy under certain conditions. He returned to the army to serve a further two months in April and May. As a young servant, he was called up for the Six-Day War in June in the Gaza Strip and the Sinai Desert front. Following this, he is stationed as a reservist at various locations in Israel for the next six months. In 1968, he finally returned to the Academy, but the year after, he broke off his studies to travel to Europe. He departed with hardly any money, just one bag and a one-way ticket, financed by money from the Academy as the winner of the Hermann Struck Prize (with a wood engraving). In the West for the first time, he hitchhiked through Europe (France, Sweden, Denmark, Switzerland, Belgium, Italy) and made a short trip to the United States, New York City, to visit Sol LeWitt, whom he knew from his time in Milan.

He enrolled at the Accademia di Belle Arti di Brera (Brera Academy) in Milan in the Painting and Sculpture Department and made frequent visit to the Faculty of Philosophy at the Università degli Studi di Milano. In 1972 Goldstein was awarded a Diploma in Fine Arts and Sculpture and continued his studies in the Scenography Department. Later that year he had his first solo exhibition in Milan at the Galleria la Bertesca. In 1973, he married Rachel Bitran.

== Career ==
Goldstein moved back to Jerusalem to establish a peripheral position from which to develop a new artistic perspective. He embarked on extensive research into other contexts marginal to the West, sowing the seeds for his future travels. At the same time, he became a lecturer in the Fine Arts Department at the Bezalel Academy of Arts and Design: his first teaching post.

In 1982, he was recalled to the army during the first Lebanon War and served in patrol operations. In the years after he was ordered to serve at the detention camp, where prisoners were detained without trial. Faced with this evidence of civil rights infringements, he refused to serve as a soldier in Lebanon. He was imprisoned as a conscientious objector, first at the Tzrifin military camp, near Rischon LeZion, and then in Prison Six, near Atlit. He became one of the first members of Yesh Gvul. Eventually, he was released early from prison, but remained on the Israeli army reserve list until 1991.

In the 1990s a number of carefully prepared travels took him to particular places in Greece, Turkey, Asia and mainly in Africa, following a quest for cultures and sites still under a strong non-Western and hermetical tradition.

During the 1970s Goldstein worked within the tradition of conceptual art using photography, film, audio recordings, performance, objects, and not at least text as his media exploring perceptional, social and political phenomena. Discontented with the Post-Modern discourse in the West, in 1978 he decided to choose Jerusalem as a place on the edge between Orient and Occident and made it the geographical as well as conceptual base for his art. At the same time, he turned to object-related sculpture based on a kind of open constructivist approach. In the 2000s, Goldstein gave his work a new and additional dimension by two books, which are not written in his mother tongue(s) but in a particular kind of English, both readable and idiosyncratic, to fit into the dominant language of global communication. In On Paper (Cologne 2004), stories and reflections on subjects like autobiography, gardening, philosophy, war, art theory, or lifestyle blend into an impressive picture of his position between different cultures. The book was followed by a long poem titled Room 205 (Cologne 2010) which describes the musings and hallucinations during a one-minute open-eye recall.

== Exhibitions ==
=== Solo exhibitions ===
- 1975 – The Israel Museum, Jerusalem, Israel
- 1983 – The Tel-Aviv Museum, Tel-Aviv, Israel
- 1986 – Museum Haus Esters, Krefeld, Germany
- 1987 – Center Georges Pompidou, Paris, France
- 1989 – Kunstraum München, Munich, Germany
- 1990 – D.A.A.D. Galerie, Berlin, Germany
- 1992 – De Appel, Amsterdam, Holland
- 1993 – The Art Gallery of York University, Toronto, Canada
- 1995 – Mala Galerija, Moderna Galerija, Ljublijana, Slovenia
- 1998 – Kunsthalle Nürnberg, Nürnberg, Germany, and Kaiser Wilhelm Museum, Krefeld, Germany
- 2010 – Zvi Goldstein: Haunted by Objects, Israel Museum, Jerusalem, Israel
- 2015 – Reconstructed Memories (Lariam B), Daniel Marzona Art Gallery, Berlin, Germany
- 2016 – S.M.A.K., Ghent, Belgium
- 2017 – Tel Aviv Museum of Art, Tel-Aviv, Israel

=== Group exhibitions ===
- 1974 – Contemporanea, Area Aperta, Rome, Italy
- 1978 – Kulturhaus, Graz, Austria
- 1987 – Documenta VIII, Kassel, Germany
- 1988 – Aperto 88, La Biennale di Venezia, Venice, Italy
- 1990 – The Ready Made Boomerang, The 8th Biennial of Sydney, Sydney, Australia
- 1995 – New Orient/Ation, 4th Istanbul Biennial, Istanbul, Turkey
- 1998 – 24th São Paulo Art Biennial, San Paolo, Brazil
- 2000 – The Oldest Possible Memory, Sammlung Hauser und Wirth in der Lokremise St. Gallen, Switzerland
- 2002 – Startkapital, K21 Kunstammlung Nordrhein-Westfalen, Düsseldorf, Germany
- 2005 – EindhovenIstanbul, Van Abbemuseum, Eindhoven, The Netherlands
- 2008 – 6th Shanghai Biennale, Shanghai, China.
- 2011 – The Second Strike, Herzliya Museum of Contemporary Art, Herzliya, Israel
- 2011 – Herzliya Biennial, Herzliya, Israel
- 2013 – Zugaben, Museum Haus Lange / Haus Esters, Krefeld, Germany
- 2019 – The Collection (1) – Highlights for a Future, S.M.A.K., Ghent, Belgium

== Museum collections ==
- Israel Museum, Jerusalem, Israel
- Tel Aviv Museum of Art, Tel-Aviv, Israel
- Kunstmuseen Krefeld, Germany
- Centre Pompidou, Paris
- Sammlung Hauser und Wirth, Switzerland

== Awards ==
- 2013 – EMET Prize in the category Art and Culture
- 2002 – LennonOno Grant for Peace, New York City, New York
- 1988 – Prize of the Ministry of Education and Culture, Israel
- 1987 – Aaron Levi Prize of the Israel Museum, Jerusalem, Israel
- 1985 – Mies van der Rohe-Stipendium artist in residence, Krefeld, Germany
- 1984 – Sandberg Prize of the Israel Museum, Jerusalem, Israel

== Solo exhibition catalogues ==
- Zvi Goldstein, The Israel Museum, Jerusalem, Israel, 1975
- Zvi Goldstein – Structure and Super-Structure, The Tel-Aviv Museum, Tel-Aviv, Israel, 1983
- Zvi Goldstein – Die Sprache des Bauens, Museum Haus Esters, Krefeld, Germany, 1986
- Zvi Goldstein -Tiers-Monde et Monde 3 – Modeles Anomaux, Centre Georges Pompidou, Paris, France, 1987
- Zvi Goldstein – The Glory of Abstraction, Kunstraum München, Munich, Germany, 1989
- Zvi Goldstein – Black Hole Constructions, D.A.A.D. Gallery, Berlin, Germany, 1990
- Zvi Goldstein, De Appel, Amsterdam, the Netherlands, 1992
- Zvi Goldstein, Mala Galerija, Liublijana, Slovenia, 1995
- Zvi Goldstein, The Israel Museum, Jerusalem, Israel, 1995
- Zvi Goldstein – To Be There, Kunsthalle Nürnberg and Krefelder Kunstmuseen, Oktagon, Germany 1998
- Zvi Goldstein – Sirocco – Day 4, 24th International Biennial of São Paulo, São Paulo, Brazil 1998

== Publications ==
- Zvi Goldstein, On Paper, Verlag der Buchhandlung Walther König, Cologne, Germany, 2004 (= Kunstwissenschaftliche Bibliothek, vol. 29)
- Zvi Goldstein, Room 205, Verlag der Buchhandlung Walther König, Cologne, Germany, 2010
