= Mediazona =

Russian online media outlet

- Website type: News website
- Available in: Russian, English
- Country of origin: Russia
- Founders: Nadezhda Tolokonnikova; Maria Alyokhina
- Editor: Sergey Smirnov (editor-in-chief)
- Key people: Pyotr Verzilov (former publisher)
- Website: zona.media
- Commercial: No
- Registration: None
- Launched: September 4, 2014; 12 years ago
- Current status: Active
- Content license: Creative Commons Attribution-ShareAlike 4.0 International

Mediazona (Russian: Медиазона) is a Russian independent media outlet which focuses on the law enforcement, judiciary and the penitentiary system in Russia. It was launched by Maria Alyokhina and Nadezhda Tolokonnikova in 2014, after they served their sentence following the Pussy Riot trial. The outlet's editor-in-chief is Russian political journalist Sergey Smirnov.

Mediazona has been named the most cited independent Russian media outlet.

== Background ==
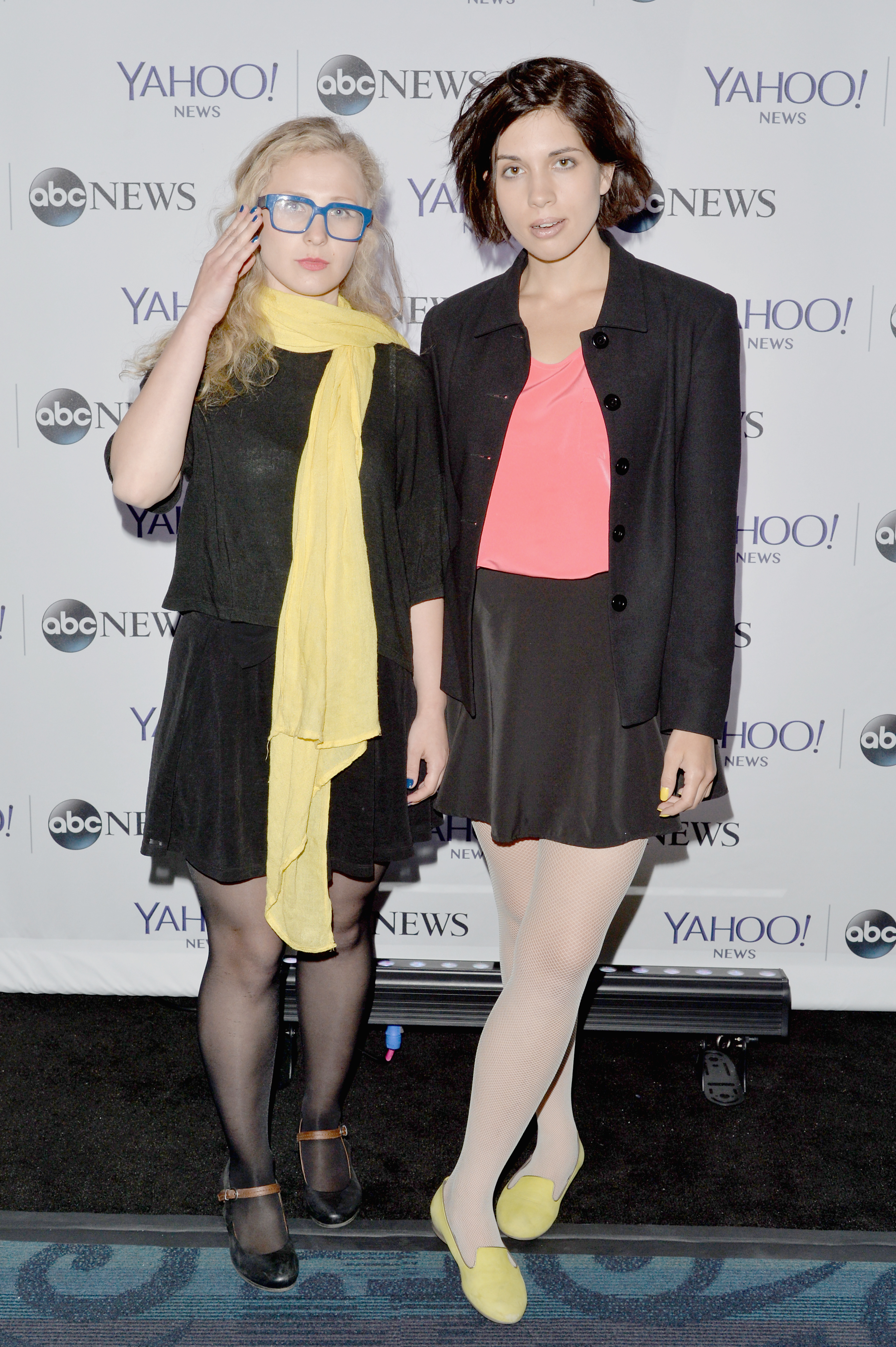
Maria Alyokhina and Nadezhda Tolokonnikova

Alyokhina and Tolokonnikova were arrested after their performance inside Moscow's Christ the Savior Cathedral on 21 February 2012. In the performance, band members asked for the Virgin Mary to protect Russia against Vladimir Putin, who was re-elected as Russia's president a few days later. Alyokhina and Tolokonnikova founded the outlet after being released from prison in 2013 following sentences of nearly two years after they were convicted of "hooliganism" motivated by "religious hatred".

Alyokhina and Tolokonnikova said that during their prison sentences, they were subjected to numerous abuses. Tolokonnikova described "slave-like conditions", including working 16-hour days sewing police uniforms, and prisoners who suffered such severe frostbite that they had to have fingers and feet amputated.

In an open letter she said,

The convicts are always on the verge of breaking down, screaming at each other, fighting over the smallest things. Just recently, a young woman got stabbed in the head with a pair of scissors because she didn't turn in a pair of pants on time. Another tried to cut her own stomach open with a hacksaw.

== Founding ==
In addition to its purpose of shedding light on injustices in Russia's courts, law enforcement and prison systems, Alyokhina and Tolokonnikova said Mediazona was created to fill the void left by the Kremlin's crackdown on Russian independent media.

Starting in 2014, several Russian media outlets had their editorial staff replaced by leadership more friendly to the Kremlin, leaving only a few independent channels and publications in existence.

Tolokonnikova said when Mediazona was founded:

Since our release from prison six months ago we've felt that Russian media are no longer able to cover what is going on. Because of the heavy censorship by authorities there is no space for anything in the media that criticizes Putin's policies and tracks human rights abuses by Russian courts and law enforcement. Courts, prisons, arrests, convictions, riots in facilities, political criminal cases, crimes by law enforcement officials — our new media outlet will try to cover it all.

Alyokhina added

There is hardly any political issues left in Russia outside of courtrooms — and there is a great need for transparency and media coverage of things that are happening down there, so we hope that Mediazona will help close that gap and change the face of independent Russian media

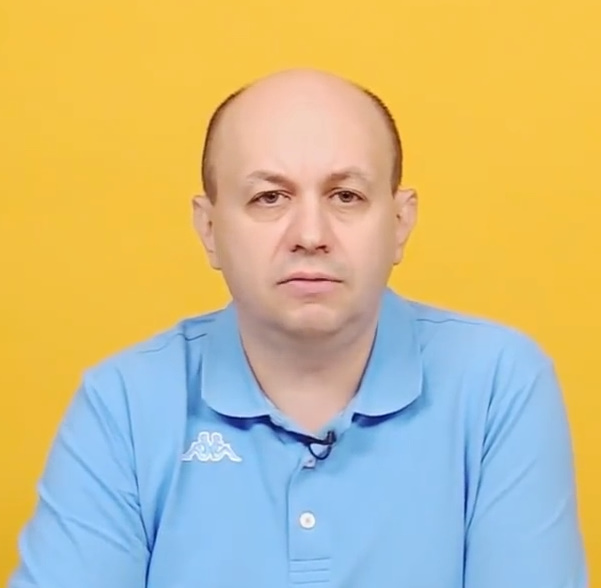
Sergey Smirnov, editor-in-chief, in 2017

According to Mediazona editor-in-chief Sergey Smirnov, the outlet's editorial office "have consciously decided not to use penalties, KPIs, and other attributes of a 'business approach'".

== Activities ==
While initially Mediazona’s content was in Russian only, it has partnered with international outlets for selected stories in English. Examples include a March 2015 story for The Guardian about the unexplained deaths of several people in police custody in a remote region of Siberia, and a July 2015 story in Vice, in which Mediazona spoke to a former prisoner from a prison camp located near the town of Gorlovka, Ukraine. The interview detailed an incident in September 2014, when troops from the pro-Russian separatist Donetsk People's Republic took over the prison camp.

In March 2016, Mediazona journalist Yegor Skovoroda was attacked while traveling with a group of reporters and activists near Ordzhonikidzevskaya in Ingushetia, just west of the border with Chechnya. The group, which included reporters for Swedish state radio, Norway's Ny Tid newspaper, Russian newspaper Kommersant, and Russia's The New Times, were trying to enter Chechnya on a press trip, where the group planned to meet with people who had been tortured or whose relatives had been kidnapped. Two of the Western journalists and two of the activists were hospitalized, and the attackers set the vehicle on fire.

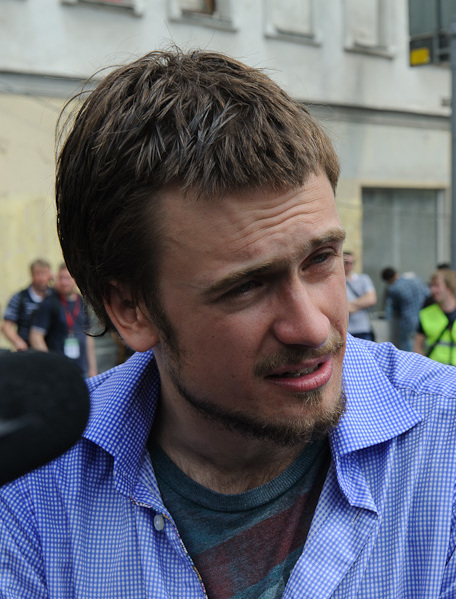
Pyotr Verzilov, former publisher of Mediazona

Initially Mediazona has been funded by Alyokhina and Tolokonnikova. Smirnov said that the outlet couldn't expect to rely on commercial income: "And what could we advertise anyway? Some lotion you put on your hands after they take off the handcuffs?" In December 2017, Mediazona became the first Russian media outlet to launch a crowdfunding campaign, raising 1 million rubles in the first month. According to then publisher Pyotr Verzilov, they decided to adopt the reader funding model because their founders' fundraising efforts were "onerous and unreliable".

In 2020, sister projects were launched in Belarus and Central Asia under Mediazona label.

On 30 January 2021, Smirnov was arrested for 15 days after he retweeted a joke about his resemblance to the frontman of the punk band Tarakany!, which contained an image with the date of the rally in support of Alexei Navalny.

On 29 September 2021, Russia's Ministry of Justice added Mediazona to the so-called list of "foreign agents". The stated reasons were the outlet's quotations of other "foreign agents" and its income from Google Ads.

On 6 March 2022, as a result of Mediazona's coverage of the 2022 Russian invasion of Ukraine, the federal agency Roskomnadzor blocked Mediazona in Russia, and demanded that the website shut itself down. A defiant editorial statement provided tips for Russian readers to evade the censorship of independent media, and promised to continue:

We were prepared for this. Over the past few days, Russia has implemented martial censorship, with almost no independent media left in the country. We understand all our risks, but we continue to work — this is our duty to our readers and to ourselves.

According to Smirnov, Mediazona lost "well over 70%" of their regular donors after Visa and Mastercard suspended operations in Russia. In September 2024, on their 10-year anniversary, Mediazona announced that their survival next year depended on getting at least 5 thousand regular donors. They achieved this goal in April 2025 and continued working with reduced staff and pay cuts.

In February 2025, the Ministry of Internal Affairs of the Republic of Belarus designated Mediazona Belarus as an extremist group.

Mediazona Central Asia suspended operations in October 2025.

Since May 2022, Mediazona has co-run Russia 200 (200.zona.media), a named database of confirmed Russian military casualties in the 2022 Russian invasion of Ukraine, jointly with BBC Russian Service and a team of volunteers. The project compiles entries from open sources including obituaries, regional news reports, and burial site photographs. By February 2026 it had recorded over 200,000 names, which the authors estimate represents between 45 and 65 percent of the actual death toll.

== Awards ==
Free Media Awards 2020.
