= Nadya Tolokonnikova =

Russian political activist and musician (born 1989)

- Надя Толоконникова
- Tolokonnikova in 2023
- Born: Nadezhda Andreyevna Tolokonnikova; November 7, 1989 (age 36); Norilsk, Russian SFSR, Soviet Union
- Other name: Nadya Tolokno (Надя Толокно)
- Citizenship: Russia; Iceland (since 2025)
- Education: Moscow State University
- Occupations: Political activist, performance artist
- Years active: 2008–present
- Organization(s): Voina, Pussy Riot
- Known for: Provocative political protests; imprisonment for hooliganism
- Criminal charge: Hooliganism motivated by "religious hatred"
- Criminal penalty: 2 years imprisonment
- Criminal status: Convicted on August 17, 2012, released under amnesty on December 23, 2013
- Spouses: Pyotr Verzilov (m. 2008; div. 2016) John Caldwell (m. 2024)
- Children: 1
- Awards: LennonOno Grant for Peace; Hannah Arendt Prize (shared with fellow band-mate Maria Alyokhina)

Nadezhda Andreyevna "Nadya" Tolokonnikova (Russian: Надежда Андреевна "Надя" Толоконникова, IPA: [nɐˈdʲeʐdə ɐnˈdrʲejɪvnə ˈnadʲə təlɐˈkonʲːɪkəvə]; born November 7, 1989) is a Russian musician, conceptual artist, and political activist. She is a founding member of the feminist group Pussy Riot, and has a history of political activism with the street art group Voina.

On August 17, 2012, she was arrested for "hooliganism motivated by religious hatred" after a performance in the Cathedral of Christ the Saviour in Moscow and was ultimately sentenced to two years' imprisonment. On December 23, 2013, she was released early alongside fellow Pussy Riot member Maria Alyokhina under a newly passed amnesty bill dedicated to the 20th anniversary of the Russian constitution. While jailed, Tolokonnikova was recognized as a political prisoner by the Russian human rights group Union of Solidarity with Political Prisoners. Amnesty International named her a prisoner of conscience due to "the severity of the response of the Russian authorities".

Russia's Ministry of Justice added Tolokonnikova to its list of "foreign agents" in 2021, and to their international wanted list in 2023.

Currently she lives outside Russia, but does not disclose where for safety reasons.

== Early life and education ==
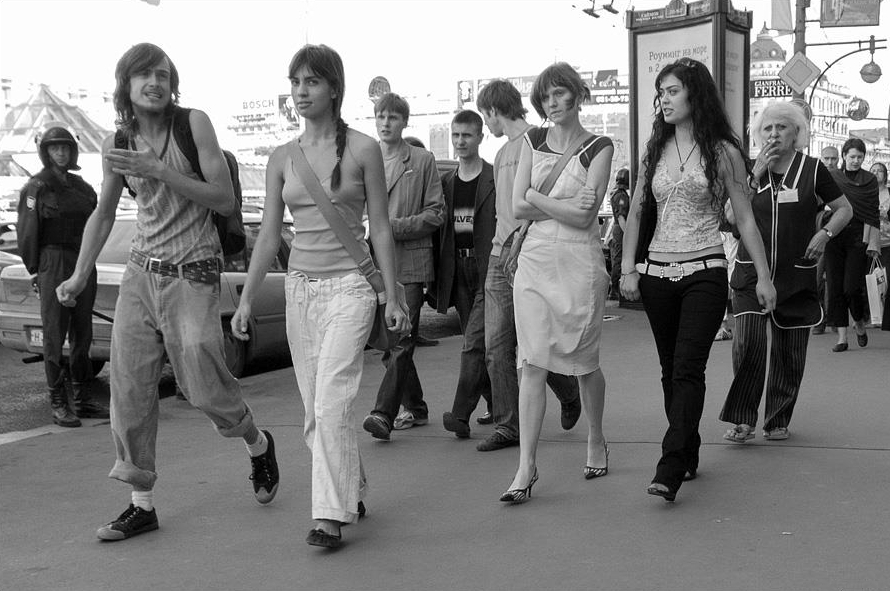
Tolokonnikova walking with Pyotr Verzilov (L.) in the June 2007 Dissenters' March

Tolokonnikova was born on November 7, 1989, in the industrial city of Norilsk, Russia, to parents Andrey Stepanovich Tolokonnikov and Yekaterina Voronina. Her parents divorced when she was five years old. In her late school years, she was active in amateur modern literature and art projects, organized by the Novoye Literaturnoye Obozreniye. In 2007, at age 17, Tolokonnikova moved to Moscow, and enrolled in the philosophy department of the Moscow State University.

== Art collectives ==
=== Early activism and Voina (2007–2011) ===
Tolokonnikova and Pyotr Verzilov joined the Voina art collective in 2007 and participated in several of their provocative art performances. In February 2008, they were involved in the "Fuck for the heir Puppy Bear!" performance in which couples were filmed engaging in sexual acts in the Timiryazev State Biology Museum in Moscow. The performance was said to be intended as a kind of satire of then President Dmitry Medvedev's call for increased reproduction. She was in the late stages of pregnancy at the time.

On March 3, 2008, she was detained by police at a dissenters march in Moscow. Tolokonnikova was among the Voina members who disrupted a trial for the director of the Andrei Sakharov Center in 2009. But later, according to the "Rossiyskaya Gazeta", together with Pyotr Verzilov were expelled from Voina "for provocation and surrender of activists of the group to the police".

She also took part in a series of actions Operation Kiss Garbage, (Russian: "Лобзай мусора", roughly translated as "Kiss a pig") from January through March 2011. This project comprised female members' kissing policewomen in Moscow metro stations and on the streets.

=== Pussy Riot (2011–present) ===
==== Formation and early actions ====
Tolokonnikova created Pussy Riot in 2011. As described by journalist Masha Gessen, the group began as "a fictional band, invented for the finale of a slide-show presentation" at a September 2011 conference for opposition groups. Tolokonnikova had recently immersed herself in feminist and queer theory and decided to use her opportunity to speak at the conference to "compensate for Russia's lack of a feminist movement, a body of social theory, or a Riot Grrrl legacy." She ended her presentation by playing a noisy recording she had made with ex-Voina comrade Yekaterina Samutsevich: shouted lyrics over a backing track, which became Pussy Riot's first song "Kill the Sexist."

As Gessen has written, "Pussy Riot is not a band. Pussy Riot is a precise weapon, aimed directly at Putin." The group emerged from the Russian activist and art scene, with Tolokonnikova bringing her experience from Voina to the new collective. Pussy Riot's early actions focused on provocative political performances in public spaces, using punk music and performance art to critique the Russian government and its relationship with the Russian Orthodox Church.

==== Punk Prayer – Cathedral of Christ the Savior performance (2012) ====
On February 21, 2012, Tolokonnikova and other members of Pussy Riot entered the Cathedral of Christ the Savior, and danced on the altar, asking Mother Mary to become a feminist, and to rid Russia of Putin. A criminal case was opened on February 26 against Tolokonnikova and two other members who had participated. The "Punk Prayer" action was called one of the greatest works of art of the 21st Century by the Guardian.

==== Arrest, trial, and imprisonment ====
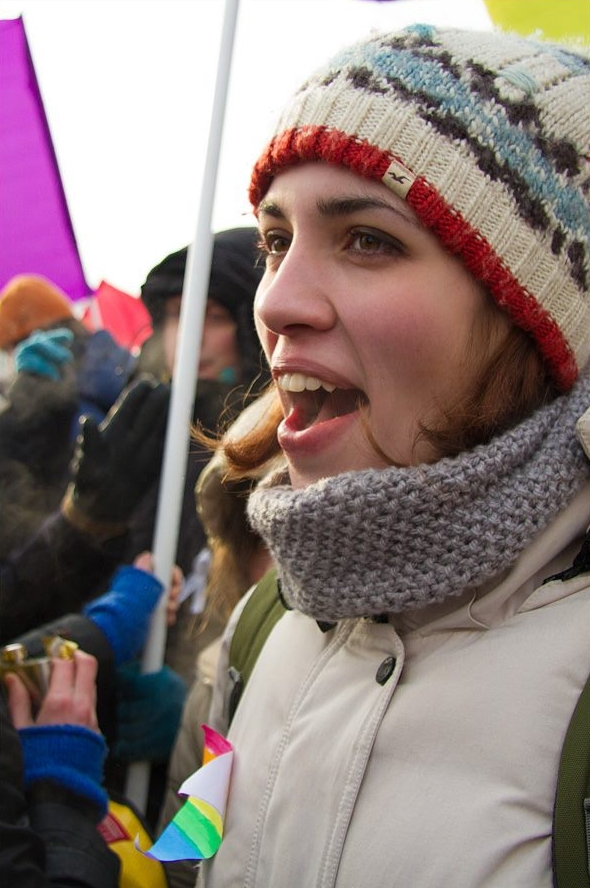
Tolokonnikova at a protest on February 4, 2012

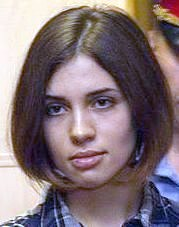
Tolokonnikova at the Moscow Tagansky District Court

On March 3, Tolokonnikova and Pussy Riot co-member Maria Alyokhina were identified by the Russian authorities. They were arrested on March 4 after being accused of hooliganism. They first denied being members of the group and started a hunger strike in protest against being held in jail away from their young children. They were held without bail and were formally charged on June 4 with the indictment running to 2,800 pages. While there was speculation that Canadian authorities might attempt to intervene because Tolokonnikova is a Canadian permanent resident, such intervention did not occur. The trial of the Pussy Riot members started on July 30, 2012, and ended in August 2012 with a verdict. On August 17, 2012, Tolokonnikova, together with co-members Maria Alyokhina and Yekaterina Samutsevich, were convicted of hooliganism motivated by religious hatred and sentenced to two years of imprisonment.

Tolokonnikova was serving her two-year sentence in the IK-14 women's penal colony near the settlement of Partsa (Russian: Парца, Явасское городское поселение), Republic of Mordovia. On September 23, 2013, she went on hunger strike over prison conditions as well as alleged threats against her life made by prison staff. Her letter about the conditions of the women in the penal colony asserted that the women have no rights, that the prisoners must work 16–17 hours and sleep 3–4 hours a day, and that they have a day off every 8th week. Further, she claimed that when prisoners complain they are punished, and that when they complain about the treatment of other prisoners they are punished even more severely. Claiming that collective punishment is frequent, she also stated that the prisoners are sometimes beaten with a particular focus on hitting the kidneys. Another asserted punishment consists of keeping a prisoner outdoors in the cold without sufficient clothing. Most of what she reported has been affirmed by other sources.

While imprisoned, she exchanged letters with filmmaker, philosopher, and cultural critic Slavoj Žižek discussing democracy and her activism. Their correspondence was arranged by the French philosopher Michel Eltchaninoff, and their 11 letters were compiled into a short book, Comradely Greetings: The Prison Letters of Nadya and Slavoj, published by Verso Books in 2014.

In late September 2013, Tolokonnikova was hospitalised after going without food for a week. She was treated in the prison's medical ward; authorities did not release more specific details. On October 21, 2013, she was transferred to another prison; her whereabouts remained unknown for several weeks. On November 5, 2013, it was reported that Tolokonnikova had been transferred to IK-50, a prison located near Nizhny Ingash, approximately 300 kilometres from Krasnoyarsk, Siberia. On November 15, she was again able to communicate with her husband through a video call from the prison hospital.

==== Release and later global activism ====
On the afternoon of December 23, 2013, Tolokonnikova was released from a prison hospital in Krasnoyarsk, where she was being treated for an unspecified illness. According to Yelena Pimonenko, senior prosecutor assistant of the Krasnoyarsk Krai, Tolokonnikova was released because the article "hooliganism" of the Russian Criminal Code fell under the newly introduced amnesty bill. Putin's amnesty was seen by the freed prisoners and numerous critics as a propaganda stunt as Russia prepared to host the 2014 Winter Olympics in February.

About her release, Tolokonnikova said: "Releasing people just a few months before their term expires is a cosmetic measure ... that includes the case of Khodorkovsky, who didn't have much time left on his prison term. This is ridiculous. While Putin refuses to release those people who really needed it. It is a disgusting and cynical act", and urged countries to boycott the 2014 Winter Olympics. She and Alyokhina said they would form a human rights movement for prison reforms. On March 6, 2014, Tolokonnikova and Alyokhina were assaulted and injured at a fast food outlet by local youths in Nizhny Novgorod. After their release, Tolokonnikova and Alyokhina founded a penal and judicial-themed media outlet MediaZona.

In February 2014, Tolokonnikova and Maria Alyokhina were detained in Sochi by the Adler Police in connection with an alleged hotel theft. They were released without charge. On February 19, footage surfaced showing Tolokonnikova and the other Pussy Riot members being attacked with nagaikas by Cossacks, who were helping in patrolling Sochi during the Winter Olympics.

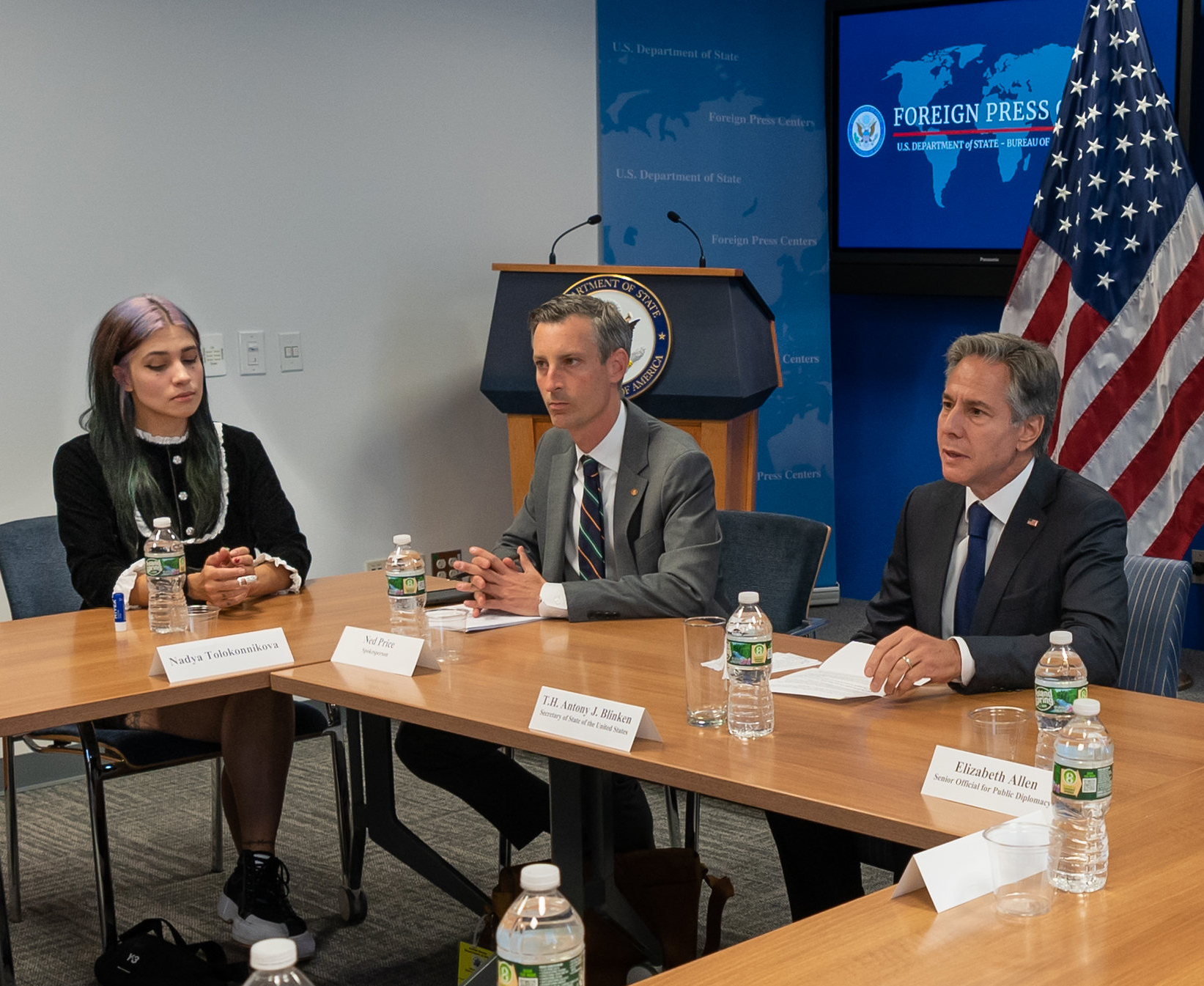
Tolokonnikova meeting with Ned Price and Antony Blinken of the State Department

In 2022, Tolokonnikova met with Secretary of State Antony Blinken to discuss freedom of press worldwide, and in particular the future of independent media in Russia, such as Mediazona. Maria Zakharova, Spokeswoman for the Ministry of Foreign Affairs of the Russian Federation, reacted to this meeting on her official Telegram channel.

==== Ongoing criminal cases (2023–present) ====
In late March 2023, the Russian Interior Ministry put Tolokonnikova on their wanted list and opened an investigation against her for allegedly having insulted religious feelings of believers. On November 21, 2023, her arrest was ordered in absentia by a Moscow court.

== Visual and performance art ==
=== Solo exhibitions ===
Year	Title	Venue	Location	Ref
2025	POLICE STATE	Museum of Contemporary Art Chicago	Chicago, US	
2025	POLICE STATE	MOCA Los Angeles	Los Angeles, US	
2025	WANTED	Nagel Draxler	Berlin, Germany	
2025	PUNK'S NOT DEAD	Honor Fraser Gallery	Los Angeles, US	
2024	RAGE	OK Linz	Linz, Austria	
2024	Pussy Riot	William Harris Gallery, Rochester Institute of Technology	US	
2024	Fear Not	Wende Museum	Culver City, US	
2023	Pussy Riot's Russia	Louisiana Museum	Copenhagen, Denmark	
2023	Putin's Ashes	Dallas Contemporary	Dallas, US	
2023	Putin's Ashes	CONTAINER Turner Carroll	Santa Fe, US	
2023	Putin's Ashes	Jeffrey Deitch Gallery	Los Angeles, US	
2017	Inside Pussy Riot	Saatchi Gallery	London, UK	

=== Group exhibitions ===
Year	Title	Venue	Location	Notes
2023	Lifelike	Cal Poly University Art Gallery	US	
2023	My Body, My Business	Sotheby's	New York, US	Auction to benefit Planned Parenthood
2023	VISUAL LANGUAGE: THE ART OF PROTEST	Subliminal Projects	Los Angeles, US	
2022–2023	Empowerment	Kunstmuseum Wolfsburg	Wolfsburg, Germany	
2022	Sensitive Content	Unit Gallery	London, UK	Curated by Helen Beard, Alayo Akinkugbe and Maria Elena Buszek
2020	Herstory: All that Women Are	Viridian Artists Inc	New York, NY	
2017	Art Riot: Post Soviet Actionism	Saatchi Gallery	London, UK	
2016	Recycling Religion	Whitebox Gallery	New York, US	
2016	Bose Clowns: Reloaded	Kunstpalais Erlangen	Erlangen, Germany	
2015	Dismaland	Weston-Super-Mare	UK	Curated by Banksy
2014–2015	Zero Tolerance	MoMA PS1	New York, NY	
2014	Take Liberty!	Norwegian Museum of Contemporary Art	Oslo, Norway	

=== Public works / Interventions ===
Year	Title	Location	Notes
2025	IT'S BEGINNING TO LOOK A LOT LIKE RUSSIA	Los Angeles, US	During No Kings Protest
2023	GOD SAVE ABORTION	Indiana Supreme Court, Indianapolis, IN, US	
2022	PUTIN'S ASHES	Geographically anonymous location	
2022	MATRIARCHY NOW	Texas State Capitol, Austin, TX, US	
2021	PATRIARCHY R.I.P.	US, nationwide	Billboard exhibition
2018	POLICEMEN ENTERS THE GAME	Pussy Riot, The World Cup, Moscow, Russia	
2014	PUTIN WILL TEACH YOU HOW TO LOVE	Pussy Riot, Sochi, Russia	
2013	LIKE IN A RED PRISON	Pussy Riot	
2012	PUTIN HAS PISSED HIMSELF	Pussy Riot, Moscow, Russia	
2011	DEATH TO PRISON, FREEDOM TO PROTEST	Pussy Riot, Moscow, Russia	
2011	KROPOTKIN-VODKA	Pussy Riot, Moscow, Russia	
2011	FREE THE COBBLESTONE	Pussy Riot, Moscow, Russia	
2011	KISS THE POLICE	Voina, Moscow, Russia	
2010	THE CONCERT IN A COURT	Voina, Moscow, Russia	
2008	STORM OF THE WHITE HOUSE	Voina, Moscow, Russia	

=== Collaborative works ===
Year	Title	Collaborators	Notes
2023	Eco-Warrior Barbie	The Yes Men	with Daryl Hannah
2023	Putin's Ashes Poster	Shepard Fairey	
2023	What If Women Ruled the World?	Judy Chicago	US
2022	Speech Itself	Jenny Holzer, PEN America	New York, US

== Other projects ==
=== Music ===
Since her release from prison, Nadya has released music under the name Pussy Riot.

=== Book authorship ===
In 2016, she wrote the autobiographical book How to Start a Revolution, published by Penguin Publishing Group. In 2018, her book Read & Riot: A Pussy Riot Guide to Activism was published by HarperCollins. It includes a reading list curated by Tolokonnikova of 123 books, articles, and tracts on protest theory.

=== OnlyFans ===
In 2021, Nadezhda Tolokonnikova announced that she had started an account on OnlyFans, a paid membership site that was known for allowing women to create and sell pornography with their own image. Tolokonnikova wrote on Twitter, "Crazy Empress." According to her OnlyFans account, a subscription to view racy images of the Pussy Riot leader cost $10 a month. The account was created in July 2021.

=== Support for Ukraine ===
Tolokonnikova has been involved in several initiatives to support Ukraine during the Russo-Ukrainian War. In 2022, she co-organized Ukraine DAO, which raised $6.7 million for Ukraine's defenses through the sale of an NFT of Ukraine's flag. She also participated in another fundraising initiative alongside artists Shepard Fairey and Jeffrey Deitch that raised money for the Armed Forces of Ukraine.

=== Unicorn DAO ===
In 2022, Tolokonnikova founded Unicorn DAO, a collector's decentralized autonomous organization (DAO) dedicated to collecting and incubating non-fungible tokens created by female, non-binary, and LGBTQ+ artists in Web3. The organization's goal is "rebalancing the scales for women-identifying and non-binary artists in a space that is already reflective of problematic gender norms".

=== Directorial work ===
Tolokonnikova has directed many Pussy Riot videos, including "Putin's Ashes", "God Save Abortion", and "Chaika" (with Andrey Fenochka).

=== Public speaking ===
Tolokonnikova has given many public speeches on activism and feminism, including at the TED Conference 2023, the United Nations, the World Economic Forum, and the European Parliament.

== Personal life ==
Tolokonnikova is pansexual. She was previously married to Pyotr Verzilov. They have a daughter, who was born in 2008.

Tolokonnikova became vegan in 2022.

On January 12, 2024, she married John Caldwell, donned in Adidas tracksuits, in the "gopnik" style, with IC3PEAK among the performers and Riley Reid as a guest.

== Awards and honors ==
- 2012 – Time's 100 Women of the Year.
- 2012 – Sakharov Prize, nominated.
- 2012 – LennonOno Grant for Peace, Pussy Riot.
- 2012 – Martin Luther "Fearless Word" Prize, nominated.
- 2012 – 1LIVE Krone, German Music Prize honoring courage.
- 2012 – Soratnik ("Companion") Prize.
- 2014 – Hannah Arendt Prize for Political Thought, 2014.
- 2014 – Prudential Eye Awards, Singapore. Digital/Video Category, nominated.
- 2015 – Arts and Humanity Award, WhiteBox (art center)/Richard Massey Foundation.
- 2019 – Honorary Doctor of Fine Arts Degree by Rhode Island School of Design – for "powerful voice in the fight against tyranny".
- 2020 – A collaborative serigraph edition with poster artist Zoltron is in the permanent collection of LACMA, as well as in The Victoria Albert Museum.
- 2019 – Best Art of the 21st Century – The Punk Prayer political art piece from 2012 was ranked in the top 5 of the Best Art of the 21st Century by The Guardian.
- 2022 – Outstanding Award by OutRight Action International for her effort raising $7M in donation for Ukraine with the NFT Project Ukraine DAO. Given remotely at the Celebration of Courage Gala.
- 2023 – Woodie Guthrie Prize.

== In popular culture ==
A documentary following the Pussy Riot court case, Pussy Riot: A Punk Prayer, debuted at the 2013 Sundance Film Festival. In 2015, Tolokonnikova and her Pussy Riot bandmates Maria Alyokhina and Pyotr Verzilov appeared as themselves in Chapter 29 of House of Cards, a popular American television drama series that airs on Netflix. In the show, Tolokonnikova and Alyokhina heavily criticized a fictionalized version of Vladimir Putin (the character, Russian president Viktor Petrov, played by Lars Mikkelsen) for corruption, while dining in the White House.

An interview between Jessica Williams, Phoebe Robinson, and Tolokonnikova was featured in a November 2016 episode of the podcast 2 Dope Queens. That same year, Tolokonnikova also appeared on a remix of the track "Jacked Up" by Weezer on the deluxe edition of their eponymous album. In 2021, Tolokonnikova appeared on the track "Stop Making Stupid People Famous" by Our Lady Peace. It was released as a single on YouTube. She also sang some lyrics. An alternative version of Purge the Poison by Marina contains a verse sung by Tolokonnikova.

== Books ==
- Tolokonnikova, Nadya; Žižek, Slavoj (2014). Comradely Greetings: The Prison Letters of Nadya and Slavoj (paperback ed.). Verso. 112 pp. ISBN 978-1781687734.
- Tolokonnikova, Nadya; Alyokhina, Maria (2016). How to Start a Revolution (hardcover ed.). Penguin Press. 112 pp. ISBN 9781594206849.
- Tolokonnikova, Nadya (2018). Read and Riot: A Pussy Riot Guide to Activism (hardcover ed.). HarperOne. 256 pp. ISBN 978-0062741585. Also published as Rules for Rulebreakers: A Pussy Riot Guide to Protest.
- Tolokonnikova, Nadya (2025). POLICE STATE (hardcover ed.). Beyond the Streets. 232 pp. ISBN 9798898140304.
