= LennonOno Grant for Peace =

Monetary grant

The LennonOno Grant for Peace is an award presented by artist and peace activist Yoko Ono. The grant, a sum of $50,000, has been awarded biennially to people and organisations chosen by Ono herself since 2002, in honour of Ono's late husband John Lennon.

== Recipients ==
2002

- Zvi Goldstein
- Khalil Rabah

2004

- Mordechai Vanunu
- Seymour Hersh

2006

- Center for Constitutional Rights
- Médecins Sans Frontières

2008

- Iceland
- Vandana Shiva

2010

- Josh Fox
- Barbara Kowalcyk
- Michael Pollan
- Alice Walker

2012

- Lady Gaga
- Rachel Corrie (awarded posthumously)
- John Perkins
- Christopher Hitchens (awarded posthumously)
- Pussy Riot

2014

- Jann Wenner
- Jeremy Gilley
- Art Production Fund
- Jón Gnarr

2016

- Olafur Eliasson
- Sir Anish Kapoor
- Katalin Ladik
- Ai Weiwei

2018

- Make the Road New York
- Wounded Warrior Fund at Walter Reed National Military Medical Center
