= Maria Alyokhina =

Russian political activist and musician (born 1988)

- Мария Алёхина
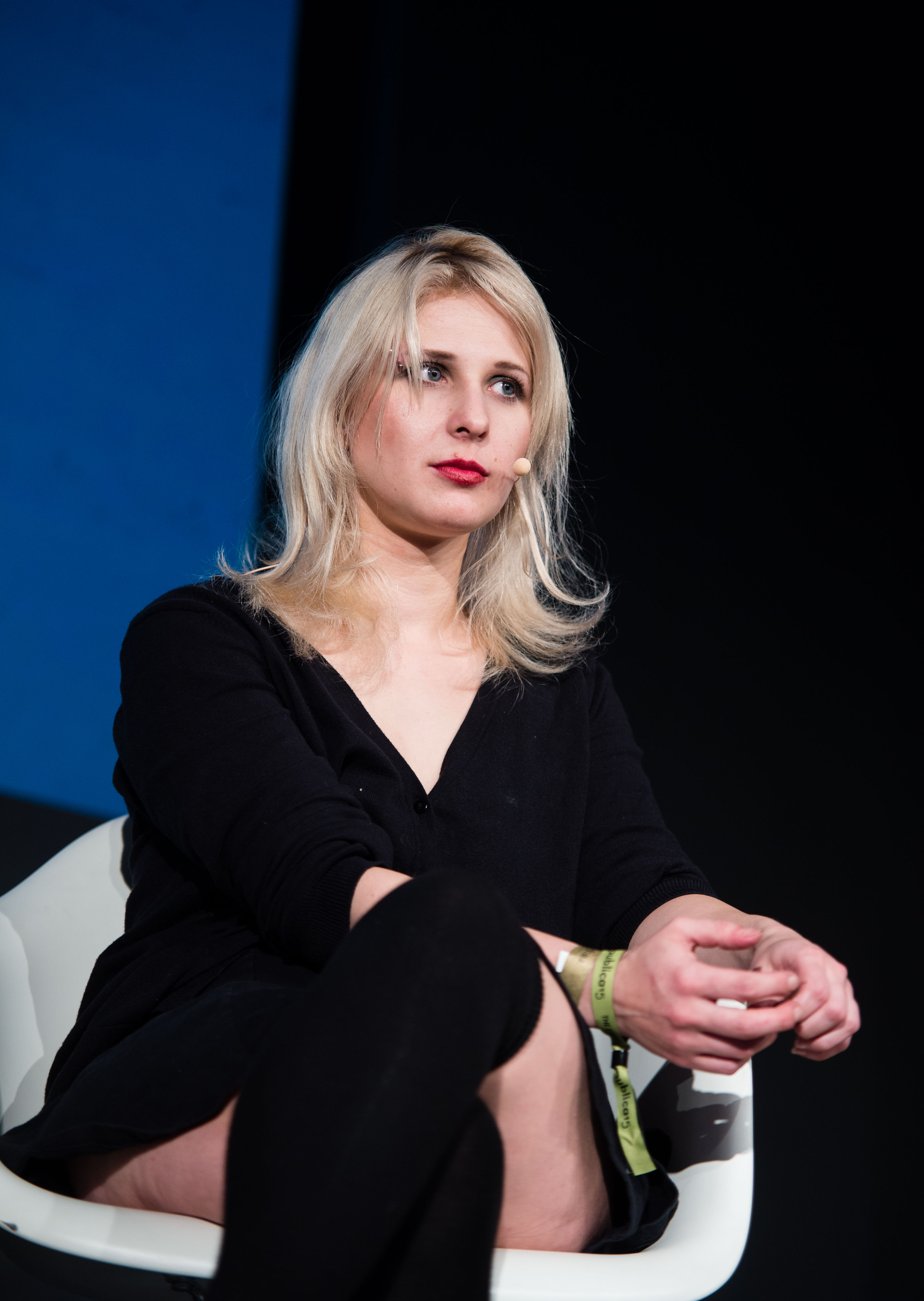
- Alyokhina in 2015
- Born: Maria Vladimirovna Alyokhina; June 6, 1988 (age 38); Moscow, Russian SFSR, Soviet Union
- Other name: Masha
- Citizenship: Russian, Icelandic
- Education: Institute of Journalism and Creative Writing
- Occupations: Political activist, student, musician
- Organization: Pussy Riot
- Criminal charge: Hooliganism motivated by religious hatred
- Criminal penalty: 2 years imprisonment
- Criminal status: Released under amnesty on December 23, 2013
- Children: 1

Maria Vladimirovna "Masha" Alyokhina (Russian: Мария Владимировна "Маша" Алёхина (Note: pronounced as [ɐˈlʲɵxʲɪnə]); born June 6, 1988) is a Russian political activist. She is a member of the anti-Putinist punk rock group Pussy Riot.

== Early life and education ==
Maria Vladimirovna Alyokhina, also known as Masha, was born on June 6, 1988, in Moscow, Russia. Her mother works as a programmer and her father is a mathematics professor. She was raised by her mother, and only met her father at age 21.

During her youth she hated the Russian education system and changed schools four times:

They discourage people from thinking and asking questions, they only teach you to follow the rules and submit without explanation or, most importantly, reason... Obviously I didn’t like that. Who would?

She studied journalism at the Institute of Journalism and Creative Writing in Moscow, where she participated in a sequence of literature workshops given by the poets Dmitry Vedenyapin and Alexey Kubrik.

== Career ==
=== Arrest and indictment ===
On August 17, 2012, Alyokhina, together with fellow Pussy Riot members Nadya Tolokonnikova and Yekaterina Samutsevich, was convicted of "hooliganism motivated by religious hatred" for a performance in Moscow's Cathedral of Christ the Saviour and sentenced to two years' imprisonment. She has been recognized as a political prisoner by the Union of Solidarity with Political Prisoners. Amnesty International named her a prisoner of conscience due to "the severity of the response of the Russian authorities."

At the time of her arrest, Alyokhina was a fourth-year student. She is also a published poet. She has been involved in environmental activism with Greenpeace Russia, opposing development projects in the Khimki Forest, and was a volunteer at the Children's Psychiatric Hospital in Moscow. She is a vegan and reportedly collapsed from hunger during the trial, as no vegan meals were provided in detention.

Alyokhina played an active role in the Pussy Riot trial, cross-examining witnesses, and aggressively questioning the charges and proceedings. She said in her closing statement:

For me, this trial only has the status of a "so-called" trial. And I am not afraid of you. I am not afraid of lies and fiction, of the thinly disguised fraud in the sentence of this so-called court. Because you can only take away my so-called freedom. And that is the exact kind that exists now in Russia. But nobody can take away my inner freedom.

Alyokhina was released from prison on December 23, 2013, under an amnesty bill passed by the Russian Duma, allowing the release of several inmates. Following her release, she and fellow Pussy Riot member Nadezhda Tolokonnikova announced their intention to campaign for prisoner's rights in Russia. On March 6, 2014, she was assaulted and injured at a fast food outlet by local youths in Nizhny Novgorod along with Tolokonnikova.

In 2013, Alyokhina and Tolokonnikova founded a media outlet, MediaZona, which focuses on the Russian penal and judicial systems.

=== Sochi detention ===
In February 2014, Alyokhina and Tolokonnikova were detained by police in the Adler district of Sochi in connection with an alleged hotel theft. They were released without charge. On February 19 footage surfaced showing Tolokonnikova and Alyokhina being attacked with horsewhips by Cossacks who were patrolling Sochi during the 2014 Winter Olympics.

=== 2021 arrest ===
On January 23, 2021, Alyokhina was arrested in Moscow and detained for 48 hours for attending a protest in support of Russian opposition leader Alexei Navalny. She was charged with "violation of sanitary and epidemiological rules", a criminal offence during the COVID-19 pandemic. On January 29, Fellow Pussy Riot member Nadezhda Tolokonnikova spoke out on Alyokhina's situation, stating "She faces criminal charges and two years in jail for encouraging people to go to protests on social networks. This is a face of Putin's Russia. They clearly have nothing else to do, but to put Pussy Riot in jail over and over again." On March 18 Moscow's Basmanny District Court extended Alyokhina's house arrest until June 23. On June 23 Maria Alyokhina, along with fellow Pussy Riot activists Lucy Shtein and Anna Kuzminykh, were sentenced to 15 days in jail. The activists were found guilty of disobeying police officers. On July 8 Alyokhina was again detained upon her release and given another 15-day prison sentence. In September 2021, a Moscow court sentenced her to one year of "restrictions on freedom" (a parole-like sentence).

=== 2022 arrest ===
On February 8, 2022, Alyokhina was arrested again, at her home. On February 27, 2022, she was arrested one more time when she was in taxi and transported to police precinct.

=== Flight from Russia ===
In April 2022, Alyokhina fled Russia disguised as a delivery driver after officials announced she would be sentenced to time in a penal colony instead of remaining on house arrest. With assistance from friends, including Icelandic performance artist Ragnar Kjartansson, Alyokhina travelled through Belarus and Lithuania to reach Iceland.

=== In exile ===
After fleeing Russia, Alyokhina and the other members of Pussy Riot conducted a tour across Europe, starting in May 2022, to raise money for the victims of the 2022 Russian invasion of Ukraine.

== Personal life ==
Alyokhina has one son named Filip, born in 2008, with Nikita Demidov.

In 2012, Alyokhina stated that she considered herself Christian, but was critical of the Russian Orthodox Church for its harsh response to Pussy Riot's Cathedral of Christ the Saviour performance.

From 2016 until at least November 2019 she was in a relationship with formerly ultra-right Orthodox activist Dmitry Enteo.

From at least early 2021 and as of November 2023, she was in a relationship with fellow Pussy Riot member, Lucy Shtein, who fled Russia in the same way a month after she did in 2022. In May 2023, Shtein and Alyokhina were proposed for Icelandic citizenship by the Alþingi Committee on General and Educational Affairs.

== Awards and honors ==
She was co-winner of the Hannah Arendt Prize for Political Thought (2014).

== In popular culture ==
A documentary following the Pussy Riot court cases, Pussy Riot: A Punk Prayer, debuted at the 2013 Sundance Film Festival.

In 2015, Alyokhina and Tolokonnikova appeared as themselves in Chapter 29 of House of Cards, a popular American television drama series that airs on Netflix. In the show, Alyokhina and Tolokonnikova heavily criticized a fictionalized version of Vladimir Putin (the character, Russian President "Viktor Petrov", played by Lars Mikkelsen) for corruption, while dining in the White House.

In 2017, she published a memoir on her trial and time in prison, titled "Riot Days". A live performance based on the book which accompanies the text with live music and projected video has toured internationally.
