= Yekaterina Samutsevich =

Russian political activist and musician (born 1982)

- Екатерина Самуцевич
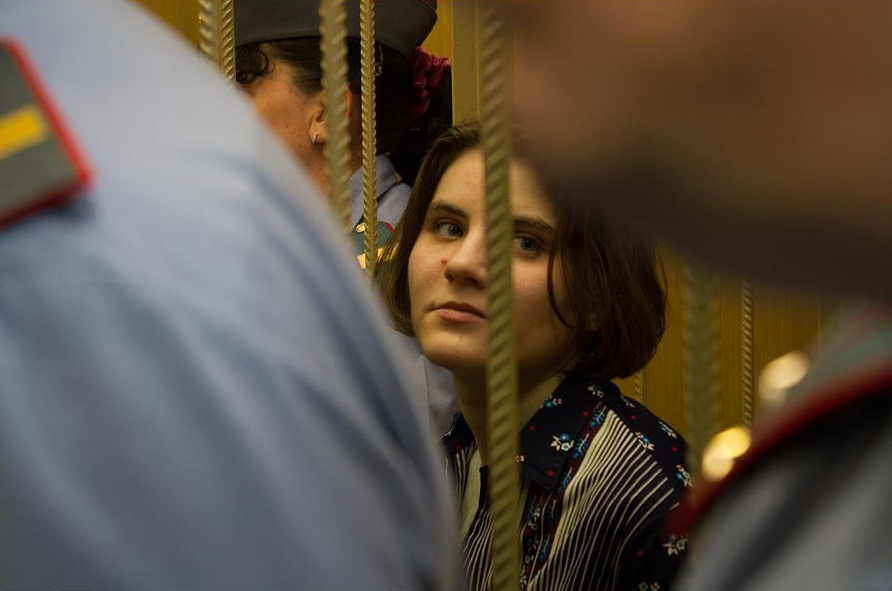
- Samutsevich at the Moscow Tagansky; District Court in August 2012
- Born: Yekaterina Stanislavovna Samutsevich; August 9, 1982 (age 44); Moscow, Russia
- Education: Moscow Power Engineering Institute
- Occupations: Political activist, musician (formerly)

Yekaterina Stanislavovna Samutsevich (Russian: Екатери́на Станисла́вовна Самуце́вич; born 9 August 1982) is a Russian political activist. She was a member of the anti-Putinist punk rock group Pussy Riot.

== Criminal history ==
On 17 August 2012, she was convicted of hooliganism motivated by religious hatred for a performance in Moscow's Cathedral of Christ the Saviour and sentenced to two years imprisonment. She has been recognized as a political prisoner by the Union of Solidarity with Political Prisoners. Amnesty International named her a prisoner of conscience due to "the severity of the Russian authorities' response".

She was released on a suspended sentence by a Moscow appeals judge on 10 October 2012 following an argument from her lawyer that she had been stopped by cathedral guards before she could get her guitar out of its case.

== Career ==
Samutsevich first studied computer science at Moscow Power Engineering Institute and worked at a research centre as a computer programmer, before quitting to study media art at the Rodchenko School of Photography and Multimedia where she graduated top of her class. For two years she worked for a defense contractor on a secret project, to develop software for the nuclear attack submarine K-152 Nerpa. Thereafter she worked as a freelance programmer. She is interested in LGBTQ issues. Court sessions were attended by her father, Stanislav Samutsevich, whom she lived with before her arrest, who stated that he felt "proud about how firm and prepared she is to face the punishment rather than betray her beliefs".

== Activism ==
Samutsevich has been a member of the Voina collective since 2007. In 2010, Samutsevich was among the Voina activists who attempted to release live cockroaches into the Tagansky Courthouse; the extent to which they succeeded in this action is disputed. She was later prosecuted in the same building for their involvement in Pussy Riot's "punk prayer". She also took part in a series of actions, Operation Kiss Garbage, from January through March 2011. This protest comprised female members kissing policewomen in Moscow Metro stations and on the streets. It was primarily an anti-government protest, but also controversial because the non-consensual "ambush kissing" could be considered sexual battery.
