= Pyotr Verzilov =

Russian-Canadian artist and activist (born 1987)

- Пётр Верзилов
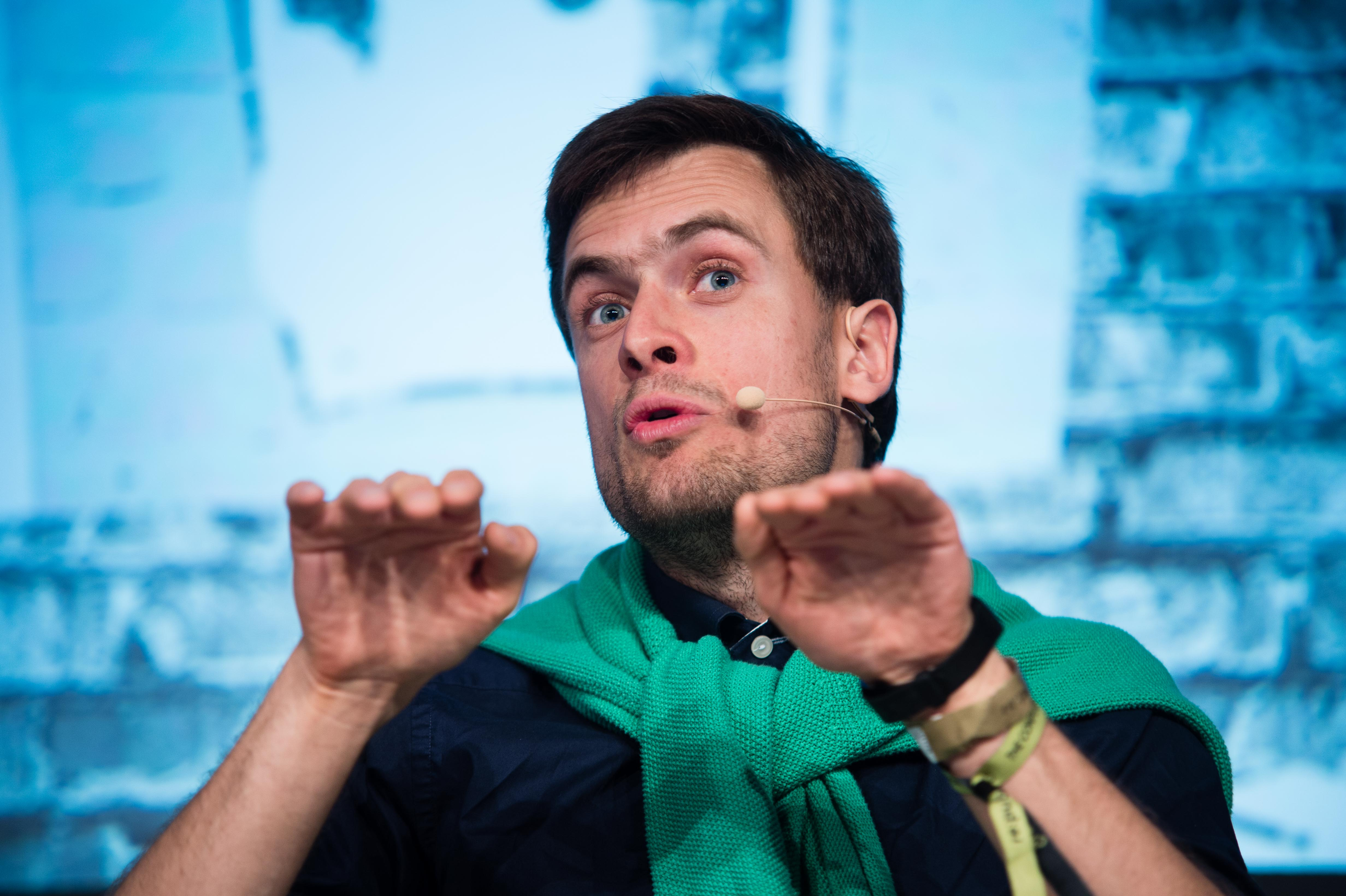
- Verzilov in 2015
- Born: 25 October 1987 (age 39); Moscow, Russian SFSR, Soviet Union
- Citizenship: Russian; Canadian
- Education: Moscow State University
- Spouse: Nadezhda Tolokonnikova (m. 2008; div. 2016)
- Children: 1

Pyotr Yurievich Verzilov (Russian: Пётр Ю́рьевич Верзилов, IPA: [ˈpʲɵtr vʲɪrˈzʲiləf]; born 25 October 1987) is a Russian-Canadian artist and activist who came to prominence as the unofficial spokesperson of the band Pussy Riot when he was arrested and jailed by the Russian state in 2012. Verzilov was married to Pussy Riot member Nadezhda Tolokonnikova.

== Biography ==
Born in Moscow, Verzilov lived in Canada as a boy, attending school in Toronto between 1999 and 2003. He returned to Russia to complete his school education, then studied philosophy at Moscow State University. "I always saw my future in Russia. I am a Russian man. I am inspired by the Russian language, the Russian reality," he later told the Toronto Star. However, because of his residency Verzilov obtained a Canadian passport and residency rights.

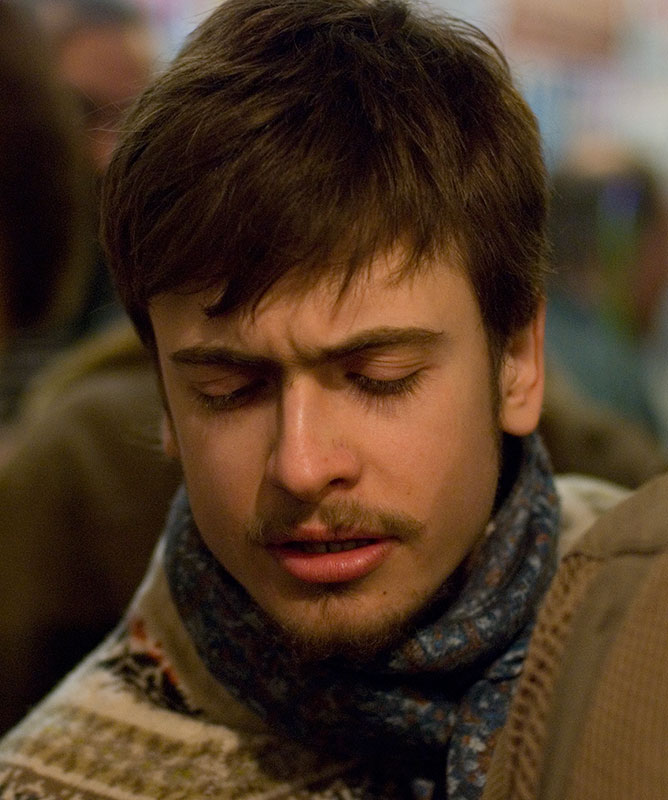
Verzilov in 2008

Verzilov met Nadezhda Tolokonnikova at university. They both became known for outrageous art performances as part of the performance art group Voina. This included filming public sex acts in a Moscow biological museum to protest the President's call for increased reproduction, in 2008, when his wife was heavily pregnant. After Voina split in 2009, the Saint Petersburg faction accused Verzilov of being a police informer. Verzilov later described these accusations as "lies – brutal, old lies", blaming them on the "very nasty breakup" of Voina.

In July 2010, at the conclusion of a trial of two art gallery curators in a Moscow court, Verzilov reportedly burst in and released a bag of live cockroaches.

Verzilov took part in the Euromaidan protest in Kyiv (Ukraine) in December 2013.

== Activism ==
Verzilov's former wife Nadezhda Tolokonnikova is a member of the Russian feminist punk rock group Pussy Riot who, in February 2012, staged a protest inside the Moscow Cathedral. On 17 August, Tolokonnikova and two other members were sentenced to two years' imprisonment for 'hooliganism'. Subsequent to their arrest and imprisonment Verzilov became a prominent representative and spokesperson for Pussy Riot.

He lobbied the singer Madonna for support prior to her 2012 Moscow concert. On 14 September 2012, Verzilov was interviewed by the BBC's Zeinab Badawi for the HARDtalk programme. In September that year, Verzilov accepted the LennonOno grant for peace from Yoko Ono, on behalf of Pussy Riot, at a ceremony in New York.

However, in October 2012, the jailed Pussy Riot members published a letter, via their lawyer, disowning Verzilov as their spokesman. They said he had "seized representation and decision-making of Pussy Riot" and had misrepresented their views. "The only person who can legitimately represent the group is a girl in a balaclava," they stated. Verzilov's actions were "treacherous to punk."

He is also among the founders of news website MediaZona, which since 2014 has reported critically on the legal system and law enforcement practice.

In mid-July 2018, along with Veronika Nikulshina, Olga Pakhtusova and Olga Kurachyova, he was jailed for 15 days after invading the pitch wearing fake police uniforms during the World Cup final. The judge also banned the four from attending sports events for three years. On 21 June 2020, Verzilov was taken from his apartment and held by anti-extremist police.

In 2021, Verzilov was named a foreign agent by the Russian government, without listing a reason.

In April 2022, Verzilov accompanied to Rome the wives of the fighters of the Azov Regiment who found themselves barricaded in the Azovstal steel plant in Mariupol. The group was campaigning to save the fighters from the siege. Among them is also Kateryna Prokopenko, wife of commander Denys Prokopenko. Days after they also met Pope Francis in Vatican City.

In December 2022, Verzilov and other members of Pussy Riot were detained at the 2022 FIFA World Cup for attempting to storm the field to protest the Russian invasion of Ukraine, imprisonment of Alexei Navalny, and to bring attention to Women's rights in Iran.

In 2023, an arrest warrant was issued for Verzilov for reporting information and photos about the Bucha massacre in Ukraine on his social media. In November 2023, Verzilov was sentenced in absentia to 8.5 years in prison for spreading "fake" news.

== Poisoning ==
On 12 September 2018, it was reported by the media that Verzilov had been hospitalized and was in critical condition in a toxicological department of the Bakhrushin City Clinical Hospital in Moscow. Doctors at the clinic suggested an overdose or poisoning with anticholinergic drugs, which are used to treat a variety of conditions, including dizziness, ulcers, insomnia, and asthma. His relatives suspected poisoning to be the cause, saying that he did not take such medicine. The hospitalization took place just after he had visited court proceedings against a Pussy Riot member, Veronika Nikulshina, at the Moscow Basmanny Court, and a critical interview about the Russian legal system given to the television channel Al Jazeera. Working for MediaZona, he was about to receive a final journalistic report on investigations on the killing of three Russian journalists in the Central African Republic in July 2018, according to the Russian newspaper Novaya Gazeta.

On 15 September, he was flown to Berlin, Germany, for further medical care and examination at the Charité hospital. On 17 September, it was reported that Verzilov was gradually recovering. On 18 September, doctors at the German hospital said in a statement that it was "highly probable" that Verzilov had been poisoned, that the cause was being investigated, but that he was going to make a complete recovery. In a statement from the same day, the Pussy Riot group stated that Verzilov was still very confused, and they accused the Russian government of poisoning. They also noted that the poison was designed to leave the victim's body quickly, so that it would be difficult to prove the exact details.

== Personal life ==
Verzilov was married to Pussy Riot member Nadezhda Tolokonnikova. They have a daughter, Gera, born in 2008. Tolokonnikova and Verzilov are now divorced.
