= Pussy Riot =

Russian punk-rock collective

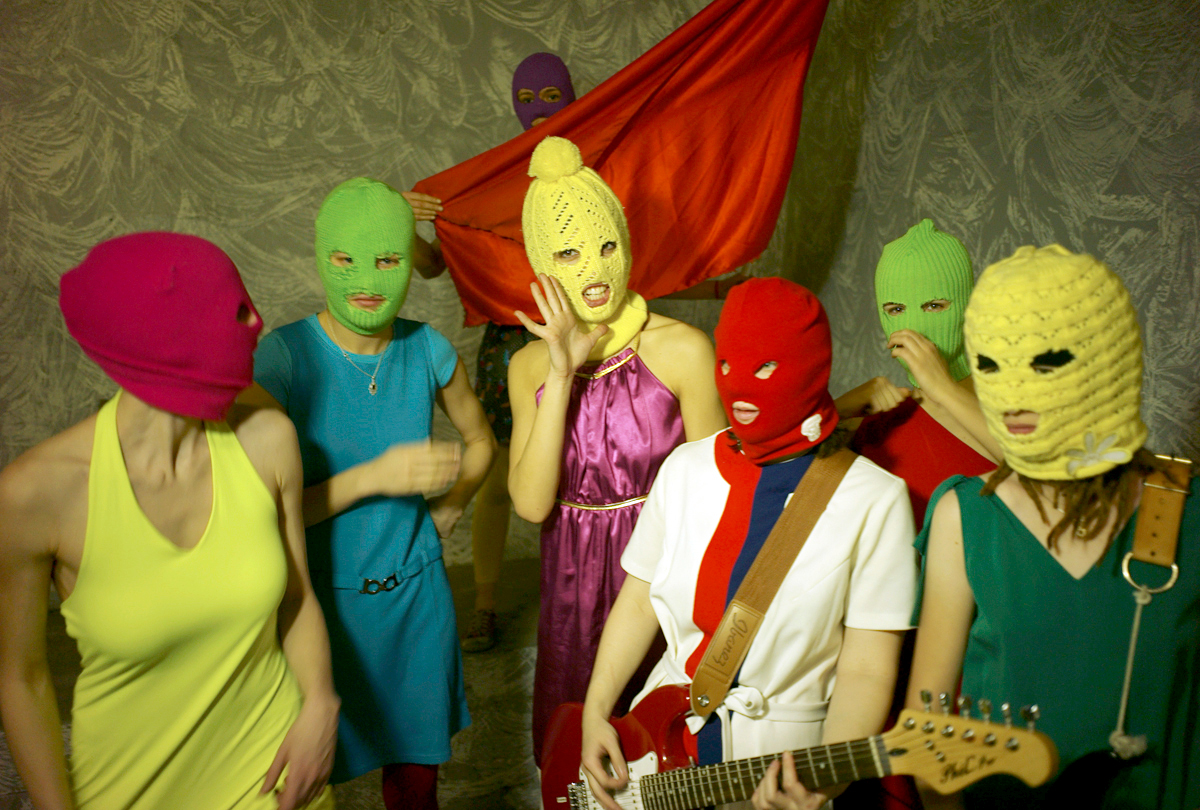
- Members of the band in January 2012

Background information
- Origin: Moscow, Russia (currently in exile)
- Genres: Protest music; pop; punk rock (early); hardcore punk (early); Oi! (early)
- Years active: 2011–present
- Members: Nadya Tolokonnikova; Yekaterina Samutsevich; Pyotr Verzilov; Taisiya Krugovykh; Vasily Bogatov; Diana Burkot; Maria Alyokhina; Lusine Dzhanyan; Alexey Knedlyakovsky; Rita Flores; Veronika Nikulshina; Olga Kurachyova; Olga Pakhtusova; Olga Borisova; Alexander Sofeyev; Lucy Shtein; Eric J. Breitenbach; Aysoltan Niyazova
- Website: pussy-riot.livejournal.com

Pussy Riot is a Russian feminist protest and performance art group that became popular for its provocative punk rock music which later turned into a more accessible style. Founded in the fall of 2011 by the then 22-year-old Nadya Tolokonnikova, it has had a membership of approximately 11 women. The group staged unauthorized, provocative guerrilla gigs in public places. These performances were filmed as music videos and posted on the internet. The group's lyrical themes included feminism, LGBTQ rights, opposition to Russian President Vladimir Putin, his policies and his links to the leadership of the Russian Orthodox Church.

The group gained global notoriety when five members of the group staged a performance inside Moscow's Cathedral of Christ the Saviour in February 2012, an action condemned as sacrilegious by the Russian Orthodox Church. Three members of the group were arrested, tried, convicted, later amnestied and released on probation. The trial and sentence attracted considerable attention and criticism, particularly in the West. The case was taken up by human rights groups, including Amnesty International, which designated the women as prisoners of conscience, and by a number of prominent entertainers. Public opinion in Russia was generally less sympathetic towards the band members.

In December 2025, the Russian Ministry of Justice added Pussy Riot to its list of extremist organizations.

== Origins ==
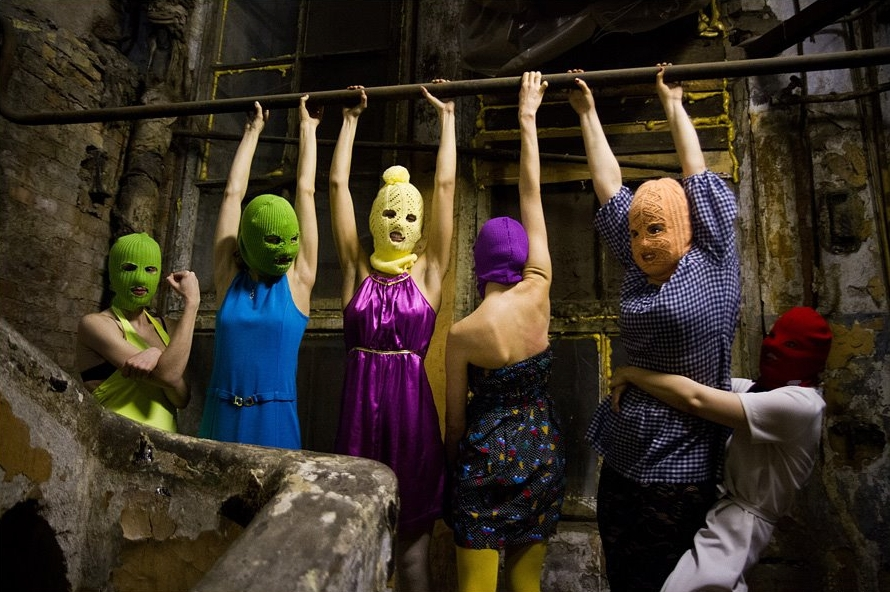
Pussy Riot members

Pussy Riot is a collective formed in late 2011 in response to national politics in Russia. Its name, consisting of two English-language words written in the Latin alphabet, usually appears that way in the Russian press, though it is sometimes transliterated into Cyrillic as "Пусси Райот". The group consisted of around a dozen performers.

Nadezhda Tolokonnikova, her husband, Pyotr Verzilov, and Yekaterina Samutsevich were members of the anarchist art collective "Voina" from the group's early days in 2007, until an acrimonious split in 2009. Following the split, they formed a separate Moscow-based group, also named "Voina", saying that they had as much right to use the name as Voina founder Oleg Vorotnikov.

Tolokonnikova and Samutsevich gave a lecture on punk feminism in 2011, in which they refer to the "Pisya Riot" band as a striking example of punk feminist art in Russia, but did not reveal their relation to the band until their arrest in 2012.

== Membership ==
The group was started by 15 women, several of whom were previously involved in Voina. While there is no official line-up and the band says anyone can join, it usually has between 10 and 20 members. The members prefer anonymity and are known for wearing brightly colored balaclavas when performing and using aliases when giving interviews. At the start, the group was relatively unknown, but this changed following a February 2012 performance in Moscow's Cathedral of Christ the Saviour. Following the performance, three women, Maria Alyokhina, Yekaterina Samutsevich and Nadezhda Tolokonnikova, were publicly identified and eventually convicted of hooliganism motivated by religious hatred. Two other women involved fled the country and have never been named.

Tolokonnikova is seen as the face of the group. She was born in Norilsk and studied at Moscow State University. Tolokonnikova and then-husband Pyotr Verzilov were members of Voina from 2007. They were involved in provocative art performances that included drawing a 65 m (210 foot) penis on a bridge and having public sex in a Moscow biological museum. Alyokhina is a single mother, poet and previously did work as an environmental activist. She was a student at the Institute of Journalism and Creative Writing in Moscow.

Samutsevich joined Voina in 2008, at the same time as Alyokhina. She is a computer programmer and a former member of Moscow's Rodchenko School of Photography and Multimedia. Samutsevich's hooliganism sentence was commuted and following release, she disappeared from the public eye. During the trial, Verzilov lobbied on behalf of all three band members, but was later dismissed after it was reported that he was the band's producer. The prisoners wrote a letter saying "The only person who has the right to represent the group is a woman with a balaclava."

Following release, Tolokonnikova and Alyokhina said they were no longer members of the group, although they appeared at various events around the world using the name Pussy Riot. Other members tried to distance themselves from the two, saying that although they were glad for their release, the members were anti-capitalistic and did not support their use of Pussy Riot to make money from songs and tours. After failing to prevent them from using the Pussy Riot name, they declared the group dead.

In 2015, Tolokonnikova and Alyokhina went their own ways and although they still follow similar paths and keep in touch, Pussy Riot is seen by some as more Tolokonnikova's project than the collective it started out as. Alyokhina created her own show, Riot Days (based on her memoir with the same name), which recounts her life as a Russian activist, and tours various fringe festivals.

During the 2018 FIFA World Cup Final, members identifying with the group invaded the pitch wearing police uniforms to protest wrongful arrests. They were Verzilov, economics student Veronika Nikulshina, journalist Olga Kurachyova and Olga Pakhtusova.

== Musical and performance style ==
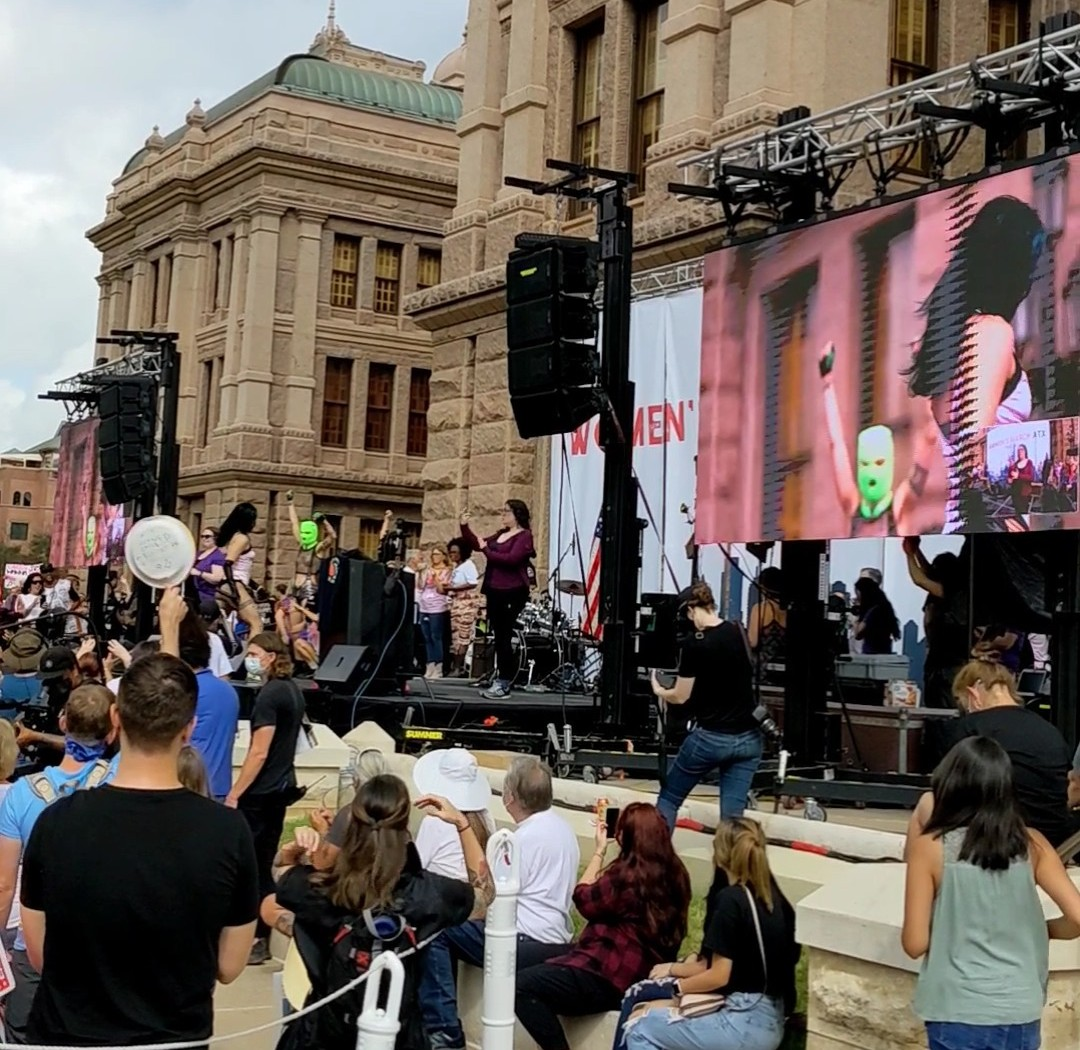
Pussy Riot performing at the Texas State Capitol in 2021

In an interview with Gazeta.ru, a band member described their two-minute concerts as performance art, creating images of "pure protest, saying: super heroes in balaclavas and acid bright tights seize public space in Moscow." Another band member, who went by the pseudonym Garadzha, told the Moskovskiye Novosti newspaper that the group was open to women recruits with limited musical talents. She said: "You don't have to sing very well. It's punk. You just scream a lot."

The group cited British punk rock and Oi! bands Angelic Upstarts, Cockney Rejects, Sham 69 and the 4-Skins as their main musical influences. The band also cited American punk rock band Bikini Kill, performance artist Karen Finley and the riot grrrl movement of the 1990s as inspirations. They stated:

What we have in common is impudence, politically loaded lyrics, the importance of feminist discourse and a non-standard female image. The difference is that Bikini Kill performed at specific music venues, while we hold unsanctioned concerts. On the whole, Riot Grrrl was closely linked to Western cultural institutions, whose equivalents don't exist in Russia.

Pussy Riot used situationist-style guerrilla performances. Tolokonnikova stated:

Pussy Riot's performances can either be called dissident art or political action that engages art forms. Either way, our performances are a kind of civic activity amidst the repressions of a corporate political system that directs its power against basic human rights and civil and political liberties.

== Costumes ==
Costumes usually consisted of brightly colored dresses and tights, even in bitterly cold weather, with faces hidden by balaclavas. During interviews, band members used nicknames such as "Balaclava", "Cat", "Seraph", "Terminator", and "Blondie".

== Ideology ==
=== Civil society ===
In an email interview with The St. Petersburg Times, the group explained their political positions further, saying that members' perspectives ranged from anarchist to liberal left, but that all were united by feminism, anti-authoritarianism and opposition to Putin, whom members regard as continuing the "aggressive imperial politics" of the Soviet Union. Group concerns include education, health care, and the centralization of power, and the group supports regional autonomy and grass-roots organizing. Members regard unsanctioned rallies as a core principle, saying that authorities do not see rallies that they have sanctioned as a threat and simply ignore them. For this reason, all of Pussy Riot's performances were illegal and used co-opted public space. Interviewed by the BBC during rehearsals the day before the Cathedral of Christ the Savior performance, band members argued that only vivid, illegal actions brought media attention. In an interview with Slate in the spring of 2018 during the band's first North American tour, Tolokonnikova stated that economic inequality "is a big issue for Pussy Riot", highlighting that such inequality was a notable feature of both Russian and American society, and that discussion of inequality was absent from mainstream political discourse in both the US and Europe.

=== Feminism ===
The group was organized in part due to anger over what members saw as government policies that discriminated against women, citing legislation that "placed restrictions on legal abortions". According to Tolokonnikova, Pussy Riot was "part of the global anti-capitalist movement, which consists of anarchists, Trotskyists, feminists and autonomists." For Pussy Riot, their music, politics, and performances stand in solidarity with other leftist freedom movements. In a February 2012 interview with Vice magazine, Pussy Riot member "Serafima" named her major feminist influences as Simone de Beauvoir, Andrea Dworkin, Emmeline Pankhurst, Shulamith Firestone, Kate Millett, Rosi Braidotti and Judith Butler.

Pussy Riot saw themselves as feminist artists who were influenced by the riot grrrl movement and musical groups such as Bikini Kill, Cockney Rejects and by writers, activists and artists like Alexandra Kollontai, Judith Butler, Karen Finley, Simone de Beauvoir and Vladimir Bukovsky. The media tended to overlook the meaning behind Pussy Riot's feminism; the cultural context of it was vastly different from that of Western feminism. According to Elianna Kan in The American Reader, Pussy Riot's feminism focused on the repression of authoritarian regimes that created idealised ideas of sexism, sex and family life. Pussy Riot strove to make it clear that feminism in Russia was still an issue and that post-feminism had not been achieved. The Russian cultural context had to be acknowledged and its feminist notions had to be seen differently from those of Western feminism because in places such as the United States, feminism evolved to general "women's issues", whereas in Russia that was not the case. In Russia, feminism was seen as something "that could destroy Russia", as said by Kirill, the head of the Russian Orthodox Church.

=== LGBTQ issues ===
Pussy Riot members were outspoken in their support of LGBTQ rights, and in a 2012 interview confirmed that the group included at least one member of a sexual minority. Both Tolokonnikova and Samutsevich participated in the banned 2011 Moscow Pride rally in Moscow, and were briefly detained after the rally was broken up by police. In a 2018 interview Tolokonnikova spoke about the importance of transgender rights to the band, explaining that she rejected gender essentialism and stating that "we believe you don't actually have to have a vagina or clitoris to be a woman, and having a clitoris doesn't necessarily make you a woman... We are always saying that anybody can be in Pussy Riot, and we really mean it". For Pussy Riot, Putin upkeeps the status quo of LGBT persecution and in Russian political life.

== Songs and videos ==
From 2011 - 2012, Pussy Riot released seven songs and five videos. An Associated Press reporter described them as "badly recorded, based on simple riffs and scream-like singing" and stated that critics had dismissed them as "amateur, provocative and obscene". The A.V. Club described them as an "excellent band" with "fuzzed-out guitars and classic Riot Grrrl chants". In an opinion piece for The New York Times, Pitchfork Media reviewer Michael Idov wrote, "judging [Pussy Riot] on artistic merit would be like chiding the Yippies because Pigasus the Immortal, the pig they ran for president in 1968, was not a viable candidate."

Pussy Riot have never released their early songs as an album, however, their songs are freely available for download on a number of Internet sites, collected together under the bootleg titles Ubey seksista ("Kill the sexist") or In Riot We Trust.

On January 31, 2018, Pussy Riot announced their first North American tour.

The music video ''My Sex'' by Brooke Candy featuring Mykki Blanco, MNDR & Pussy Riot was nominated for Best Animation at the Berlin Music Video Awards 2019.

In 2021, Pussy Riot's music video for ''Panic Attack'' received a nomination at the Berlin Music Video Awards for Best Experimental. The director behind this music video is Asad J. Malik.

On 5 August 2022, Pussy Riot's Matriarchy Now mixtape, was released.

In 2026, they announced their first album titled CYKA, with a release date of June 12, 2026.

=== "Kill the Sexist" ===
On October 1, 2011, Tolokonnikova and Samutsevich gave a lecture on "punk feminism" as members of Voina. They played a recording of the song "Ubey seksista" ("Kill the Sexist"), billing the performers as "a new Russian punk band called Pussy Riot". This track featured extensive sampling of the Cockney Rejects' 1979 recording "I'm Not a Fool".

=== "Release the Cobblestones" ===
Their first public performance as members of Pussy Riot was in November 2011. Several masked women performed "Osvobodi Bruschatku" ("Release the Cobblestones") atop a scaffold in a Moscow subway and from the top of trolley cars, while tearing apart down feather pillows, showering feathers onto the train platform below. The song recommended that Russians protest upcoming parliamentary elections by throwing cobblestones during street clashes. "Your ballots will be used as toilet paper by the Presidential Administration", the group said on its blog. Their first video was uploaded to YouTube on November 6. The musical track once again used extensive sampling, this time from the Angelic Upstarts' 1978 recording "Police Oppression". The video of the performance quickly went viral and generated a flurry of interest from the Russian press.

=== "Kropotkin Vodka" ===
Later that month the group re-emerged, with several members playing "Kropotkin Vodka" on the roof of an automobile display unit in a luxury-store district and in the windows of fashion boutiques, while another member discharged a fire extinguisher into the air. The song took its title from Russian anarcho-communist Peter Kropotkin, and metaphorically concerned the assassination of "Kremlin bastards" by fatal poisoning.

=== "Death to Prison, Freedom to Protests" ===
On December 14, 2011, the group performed atop a garage beside the Moscow Detention Center No. 1 prison, where opposition activists were being held among the prisoners. Political activists Alexei Navalny and Ilya Yashin had been arrested one week earlier at a mass protest against the results of the State Duma elections. Pussy Riot played their song "Smert tyurme, svobodu protestu" ("Death To Prison, Freedom To Protests"), a pun on the Yugoslav Partisan World War II slogan "Death to fascism, freedom to the people", and were applauded by the prisoners watching from inside the bars of the jail cell windows.

=== "Putin Zassal" ===
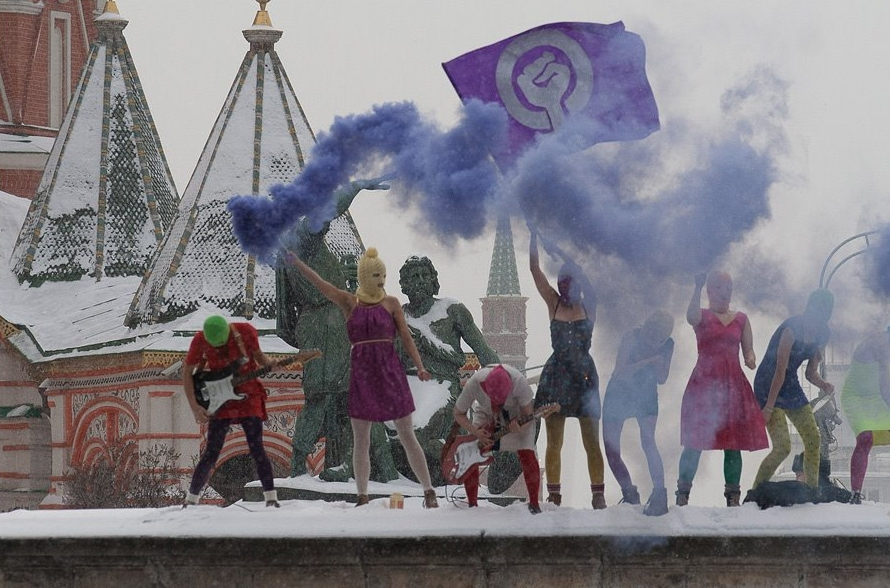
Pussy Riot performing at Lobnoye Mesto in Red Square, on January 20, 2012

On January 20, 2012, in what the Associated Press described as their "breakthrough performance", eight members of the group performed a song on the Lobnoye Mesto in Red Square, entitled "Putin Zassal". The title was variously translated by English language media as "Putin has Pissed Himself", "Putin Chickened Out", "Putin Got Scared" and "Putin is Wetting Himself". The song called for a popular revolt against the Russian government and an occupation of Red Square. According to a Pussy Riot member identified as "Shayba", the song was inspired by the events of December 24, 2011, during which approximately 100,000 people attended anti-Putin rallies in central Moscow. She told the Financial Times: "We saw how troops were moving around Moscow, there were helicopters in the sky, the military was put on alert. The regime just wet its pants on that day. And the symbol of the regime is Putin." During the performance a member ignited a smoke bomb, which led to Pussy Riot members being arrested and briefly detained on administrative charges, a Russian legal term similar to a summary offence or misdemeanor. A judge found two members of the group, Galkina and Schebleva, "guilty under article 20.2 of the Administrative Code (violation of the rules for conducting rallies and pickets) and imposed a fine of 500 rubles on each."

=== "Mother of God, Drive Putin Away" ===
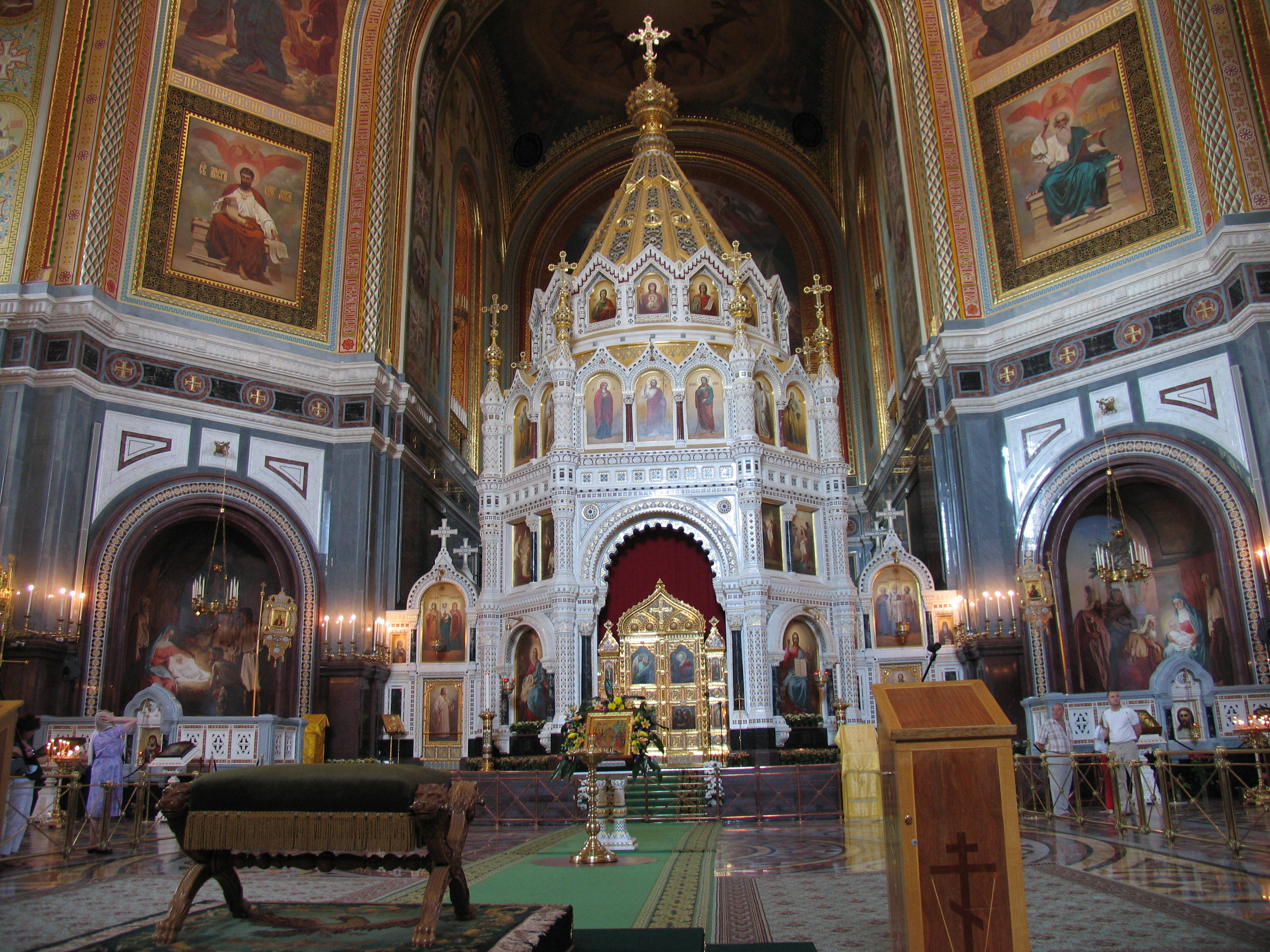
Interior of the Cathedral of Christ the Savior

On February 21, 2012, as part of a protest movement against the re-election of Vladimir Putin, five women from the group entered the Cathedral of Christ the Savior of the Russian Orthodox Church in Moscow. There was no church service in session at the time, and only a few people were in the cathedral. Removing their winter clothes, they put on colorful balaclavas, ran up the steps leading to the altar, and began to jump, kick, and throw air punches. After less than a minute, they were escorted outside the building by guards. Film of the performance was later combined with footage shot at a different church, identified by Russian Orthodox Church spokesman Vsevolod Chaplin as the Epiphany Cathedral in Yelokhovo, to create a video clip for the song, which they entitled "Punk Prayer: Mother of God Drive Putin Away".

The song, which they described as a punk moleben (supplicatory prayer), borrowed its opening melody and refrain from Sergei Rachmaninoff's "Bogoroditse Devo, Raduisya" (Ave Maria), from the All Night Vigil. In the song, they invoked the name of the Virgin Mary, urging her to get rid of Russian Prime Minister Vladimir Putin and to "become a feminist", claiming that she would support them in their protests. They alluded to close ties between the church and the KGB ("Black robes, golden epaulettes"), criticized the subservience of many Russians to the church ("Parishioners crawl bowing") and attacked the church's traditionalist views on women ("So as not to offend His Holiness, women must bear children and love"). They used the crude epithet "Sran Gospodnya", which has been used to translate "holy shit" in Hollywood movies, but is rarely used in idiomatic Russian; it literally translates as "shit of the Lord". They later explained "It is an idiomatic expression, related to the previous verse – about the fusion of Moscow patriarchy and the government. 'Holy shit' is our evaluation of the situation in the country." They referred to Russian Orthodox Patriarch Kirill I, as a "suka" (bitch) and accused him of believing more in Putin than in God.

=== "Putin Lights Up the Fires" ===
Pussy Riot released a single in August 2012 as the court case against three of their members drew to a close. It was called "Putin zazhigayet kostry" ("Putin Lights Up The Fires"), and its lyrics addressed issues related to the case. Among other statements, they suggested that "seven years [imprisonment] are not enough, give us eighteen!"

=== "I Can't Breathe" ===
Pussy Riot released their first song and video in English in February 2015. "I Can't Breathe" is named for the last words that Eric Garner said as New York City Police held him to the ground in a chokehold. In their music video for this song, band members wear Russian riot police uniforms and are slowly buried alive as they sing. They wear these specific uniforms because they are worn by Russian police during clashes between police and protesters for change, and to make the statement that illegal violence not only kills the oppressed, but slowly kills the oppressors. According to Alyokhina and Tolokonnikova, "Policemen, soldiers, agents, they become hostages and are buried with those they kill, both figuratively and literally". The symbolism behind the "Russian Spring" brand cigarettes in the video is that the brand name is the same phrase used by supporters of Russia's war with Ukraine. Pussy Riot was responsible for concept and production of the video, while vocals and lyrics were performed by two other Russian bands, Jack Wood and Scofferlane. With this song, Alyokhina and Tolokonnikova begin to show the parallels between police brutality and state oppression in Russia and the United States.

=== Chaika (Yury Chaika) ===
On 2015 the Anti-Corruption Foundation released Chaika about Yury Chaika and his family. On February 3, 2016 Pussy Riot released a satirical music video titled Chaika, alluding to Navalny's findings.

=== "Make America Great Again" ===
In response to Donald Trump's candidacy, Pussy Riot released the song and video "Make America Great Again" in October 2016. The video depicts a dystopian world where Trump, played by one of the band members, is the president. Trump enforces his values through beatings, shaming, and branding of victims delivered by stormtroopers. As the thugs torture their victims, Pussy Riot sings the following lyrics: "Let other people in/ Listen to your women/ Stop killing black children/ Make America great again".

=== "Bad Apples" ===
In March 2018 Pussy Riot, together with TV on the Radio's Dave Sitek, released the single and video "Bad Apples". The song is a statement against corruption in the criminal justice system.

=== "Hangerz" ===
In December 2019, Pussy Riot, together with Vic Mensa and Junglepussy, released the song "Hangerz". The song was written in response to Alabama's anti-abortion legislation. All proceeds from the song will go towards Planned Parenthood.

=== "My Agenda" ===
In October 2020, Pussy Riot, along with the Village People, made guest appearances on the Dorian Electra single "My Agenda". Pussy Riot's lyrics in the song encourage rebellion against the Russian gay propaganda law and also make reference to similar anti-gay laws in Uganda. The song was released on Electra's album of the same name.

=== "Q" ===
On June 23, 2022, Pussy Riot a made guest appearance on the Kai Whiston single "Q", composed by Nadezhda Tolokonnikova and Kai Whiston.

== 2012 arrests, trial and imprisonment ==
On March 3, 2012, two of the group's members, Nadezhda Tolokonnikova and Maria Alyokhina, were arrested and charged with hooliganism related to their performance inside Moscow's Cathedral of Christ the Saviour. A third member, Yekaterina Samutsevich, was arrested on March 16 with the same charges. Denied bail, the three were held in custody until their trial began in late July. On August 17, 2012, Alyokhina, Samutsevich and Tolokonnikova were all convicted of "hooliganism motivated by religious hatred" and each sentenced to two years' imprisonment. On October 10, following an appeal, Samutsevich was freed on probation and her sentence suspended. The sentences of the other two women were upheld.

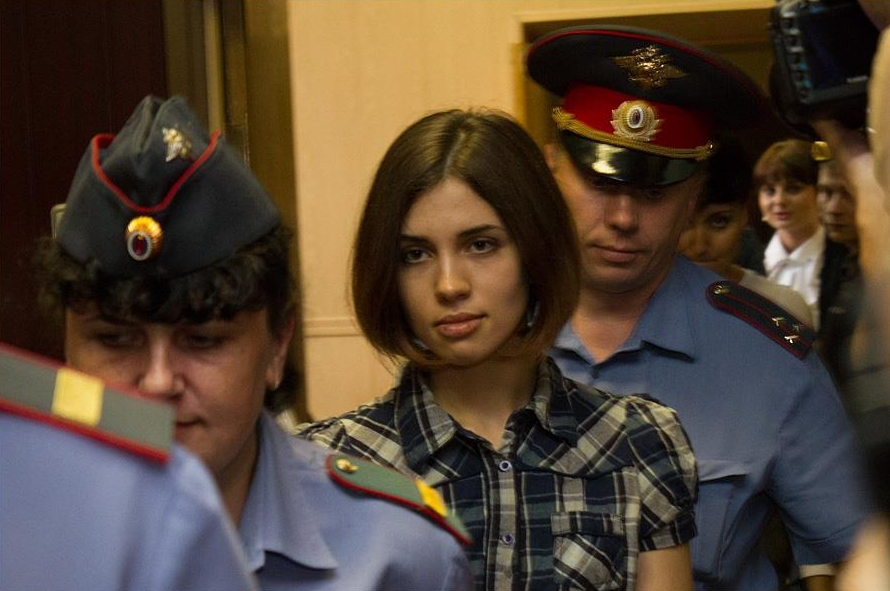
Nadezhda Tolokonnikova

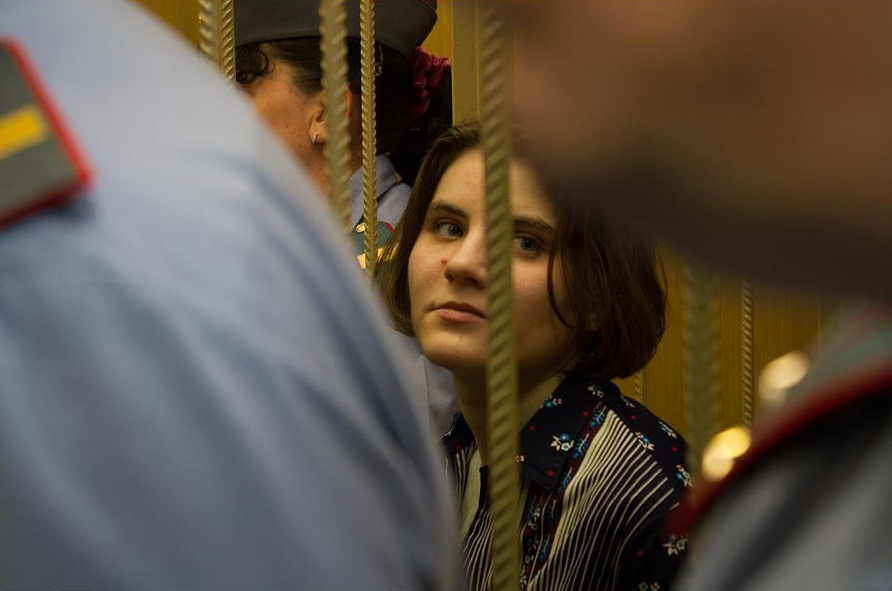
Yekaterina Samutsevich

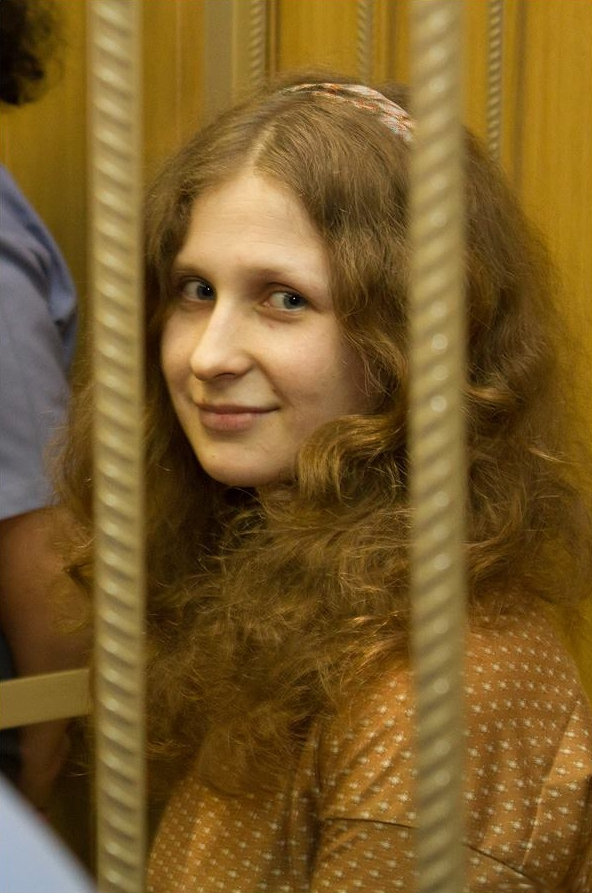
Maria Alyokhina

The three Pussy Riot members at their trial in Tagansky District Court

Pussy Riot accused Putin and the Russian Orthodox Church of orchestrating the case. Samutsevich said "The trial was built in such a way that we couldn't defend ourselves. They didn't listen to us." Russian human rights activist Lyudmila Alexeyeva called the judgment politically motivated and "not in line with the law, common sense or mercy". According to BBC Monitoring, in the European and American press there was "almost universal condemnation" of the sentence.

== Subsequent court cases and other events ==
=== Claims for moral damages ===
In August 2012 Novosibirsk resident Irina Ruzankina filed a claim for 30,000 rubles (about $1,000) for moral damages, claiming that a Pussy Riot video had caused her headaches and increased blood pressure. The claim was rejected by the Kuntsevo District Court in Moscow on September 7, 2012. Similar claims by Berdsk resident Yuri Zadoy and Novosibirsk resident Ivan Krasnitsky were dismissed by the same court on October 3, as was a subsequent appeal by Ruzankina to the Moscow City Court on February 18, 2013.

=== Extremist videos decision ===
In early November 2012 prosecutors applied under anti-extremism legislation to Zamoskvoretsky District Court to ban several Pussy Riot videos, including the video of the group's performance in the Cathedral of Christ the Savior. Materials found to be extremist by a court are added to the Federal List of Extremist Materials maintained by the Ministry of Justice, potentially making it a criminal offense to disseminate them within Russia.

Damir Gainutdinov of the Agora human rights group argued that the anti-extremism laws were being applied inappropriately, saying "Everyone says that the [Cathedral of Christ the Savior] video hurt the feelings of religious people, but it didn't contain any calls for extremist actions, so it cannot be extremist". Yekaterina Samutsevich called the ruling a "direct recognition of artistic censorship" in Russia.

=== Requests for sentence deferment ===
In the case of mothers of young children, Russian law allows for deferment of a prison sentence until the child reaches the age of 14. Such a request was controversially granted in 2011 to Anna Shavenkova, who had been sentenced to two years and six months prison for vehicular manslaughter. It was alleged that her request was granted because of her family connections.

On October 19, 2012, the Khamovniki District Court in Moscow rejected an appeal for deferment of sentence filed by Violetta Volkova on behalf of Tolokonnikova and Alyokhina, on the grounds that the case did not fall within its jurisdiction. Tolokonnikova subsequently filed an appeal with the Zubovo-Polyansky District Court in Mordovia, where she was imprisoned, and Alyokhina with the Berezniki District Court in Perm. Alyokhina's appeal was rejected on January 16, 2013, the judge stating that the presence of her child was already taken into account during her original sentence.

On July 24, 2013, a Russian court turned down an appeal by Maria Alyokhina against a previous court ruling that denied her an early release on parole.

=== Release from prison ===
On December 19, 2013, the state Duma approved a general amnesty for various prisoners; among those who qualified for amnesty were those in prison for non-violent offences and mothers of young children. It was expected that Tolokonnikova and Alyokhina would be among those who were released. Their release was confirmed on December 23, 2013.

Following her release, Alyokhina went to meet with human rights activists. "We didn't ask for any pardon. I would have sat here until the end of my sentence because I don't need mercy from Putin," Maria Alyokhina told The New York Times after her release. "I think this is an attempt to improve the image of the current government, a little, before the Sochi Olympics — particularly for the Western Europeans. But I don't consider this humane or merciful. This is a lie." Tolokonnikova also said, "Whether one likes it or not, going to the Olympics in Russia is an acceptance of the internal political situation in Russia, an acceptance of the course taken by a person who is interested in the Olympics above all else — Vladimir Putin."

The two said that they would not be performing in shows but were starting an organization to work for better conditions for prison inmates and that they still wanted Putin removed from government. Both said that Soviet dissident Vladimir Bukovsky is their role model, a man whom Tolokonnikova said is a "human rights champion undeterred by fear."

=== Amnesty International concert and membership controversy ===
Nadezhda Tolokonnikova (Nadia) and Maria Alyokhina (Masha) participated in the February 6, 2014 Amnesty International concert in Barclays Center, Brooklyn, New York City. They were invited to the stage by Madonna. The same day a group of anonymous participants of the Pussy Riot group who avoided prosecution for their performance published an open letter protesting Tolokonnikova and Alyokhina calling themselves members of Pussy Riot. The letter stated that its anonymous authors were all female, with "leftist anti-capitalist ideology", distributing its artwork freely; that all their performances were "illegal"; and that they opposed all "personality cult[s]" and hierarchies; and it rejected the "mixing of the rebel feminist punk image with the image of institutionalized defenders of prisoners' rights".

In response Tolokonnikova and Alyokhina stated that:

When we were jailed, Pussy Riot immediately became very popular and widely known, and it turned from just a group to essentially an international movement. Anybody can be Pussy Riot, you just need to put on a mask and stage an active protest of something in your particular country, wherever that may be, that you consider unjust. And we're not here as the leaders of Pussy Riot or determining what Pussy Riot is and what it does or what it says. We are just two individuals that spent two years in jail for taking part in a Pussy Riot protest action.

=== Presence at the Sochi Winter Olympics ===
Tolokonnikova, Alyokhina, and three unidentified women planned to perform a song called "Putin Will Teach You to Love the Motherland" as Pussy Riot during the 2014 Winter Olympics in Sochi. The action was supposed to be concerned with the prisoners in the Bolotnaya Square case, corrupt Olympic officials, the plight of the arrested environmentalist Yevgeny Vitishko and suppressed freedoms in Russia. On February 18, 2014, they were detained in Sochi together with a group of 12-15 people including Yevgeny Feldman, a Novaya Gazeta journalist. The authorities explained that the arrest was in connection with a theft at a hotel in Sochi. In a few hours they were released from an Adler police station. According to BBC correspondent Rafael Saakov the five women left the police station in balaclavas singing their song "Putin Will Teach You to Love the Motherland" on the streets of Adler. On February 19, 2014, during the second attempt to film "Putin Will Teach You to Love the Motherland" near Sochi Seaport, the group was beaten by uniformed Russian Cossack paramilitary providing security for the Olympics. An attorney for the band members stated they were treated at a hospital for injuries received during the attack. A video of the performance was posted on YouTube on February 19, 2014.

=== Assault in Nizhny Novgorod ===
On March 6, 2014, during a visit to Nizhny Novgorod as part of a campaign for prisoners' rights, a group of unknown men wearing Ribbon of Saint George medals doused group members Nadezhda Tolokonnikova, Maria Alyokhina, and Taisia Krugovykh with brilliant green dye, allegedly damaging their eyes. Alyokhina also suffered a concussion after being hit with a jar containing brilliant green.

=== European Court of Human Rights ===
In 2014, Alyokhina and Tolokonnikova brought suit in the European Court of Human Rights, for their arrest and detention. In May 2015, Alyokhina and Tolokonnikova together with Tolokonnikova's husband Pyotr Verzilov, Krasnodar artist Lusine Dzhanyan, and activist Alexey Nekrasov, brought another suit in the European Court of Human Rights over police inaction and refusal to prosecute Cossacks who attacked Pussy Riot during their video shoot at the Sochi Winter Olympics for the song "Putin Will Teach You to Love the Motherland". In 2023, the court decided in favor of Pussy Riot, finding the attack by Cossack militia unprovoked, and ordered the Russian government to pay each victim $24,000 in damages.

=== 2018 detainment ===
On February 27, 2018, three band members had been detained by Russian police somewhere between Moscow and the Crimea. This detention came after the band demonstrated outside of a Siberian prison to free Ukrainian film director Oleg Sentsov. Later that day Pussy Riot tweeted that the detained band members were safe.

=== World Cup final pitch invasion ===
On July 15, 2018, three female members of Pussy Riot and one man (Pyotr Verzilov, the husband of Nadezhda Tolokonnikova), dressed as police officers, performed a football pitch invasion of Moscow's Luzhniki Stadium during the second half of the 2018 FIFA World Cup Final match between France and Croatia. They named their performance "Policeman Enters the Game". Croatia defender Dejan Lovren pushed one of the invaders to the ground before security personnel escorted them off. Veronika Nikulshina reached the center of the field and shared a double high five with France forward Kylian Mbappé. Pussy Riot issued a statement of the aims of their protest and their demands on the Russian authorities. Verzilov, Veronika Nikulshina, Olga Pakhtusova, and Olga Kurachyova were sentenced to 15 days imprisonment under Russia's Administrative Code. Broadcaster Scott Simon described the event as "a conspicuous act of bravery".

=== During the Russian invasion of Ukraine ===
In February 2022, Pussy Riot founder Nadya Tolokonnikova created a fund-raiser that sent $6.7 million dollars in cryptocurrency to the Ukrainian government and charities including Come Back Alive and an LGBTQ focused Ukraine fund by Outright International.

In 2022, Maria Alyokhina and Lucy Shtein were able to escape house arrest in Russia, and each of them fled the country disguised as delivery drivers, a month apart, to Lithuania. They were proposed for fast-track citizenship in Iceland by parliament decree in May 2023. Shtein was later sentenced in absentia to six years in prison for her online anti-war posts.

In February 2023, Pussy Riot and artist Shepard Fairey donated funds to a Ukrainian frontline unit in Bakhmut.

In March 2023, Tolokonnikova was placed on Russia's most wanted list, facing unspecified criminal charges, and later in November arrested in absentia.

On September 18, 2024, the Ministry of Internal Affairs announced a search for Pussy Riot members Maria Alyokhina, Olga Borisova, Diana Burkot, Alina Petrova, and Taso Pletner. According to TASS, it was initially assumed that a case against them could be opened under an article concerning the financing of terrorism. Later, information emerged about the initiation of a case concerning the spread of "fakes" about the Russian army on political grounds due to the antiwar clip "Mama, Don't Watch TV" and a performance that took place on April 18, 2024, at the Pinakothek der Moderne art museum.

On September 15, 2025, the Basmanny District Court of Moscow handed down an in absentia sentence to five Pussy Riot members to terms ranging from 8 to 13 years in a labor colony due to an antiwar action and the clip "Mama, Don't Watch TV". Maria Alyokhina received 13 years and 15 days in absentia, Taso Pletner received 11 years in absentia, Olga Borisova, Alina Petrova, and Diana Burkot each received 8 years in absentia.

On December 15, Pussy Riot was designated as an extremist organization with a ban on its activities on the territory of Russia.

In May 2026, Pussy Riot along with feminist group FEMEN protested Russia's return to the Russian pavilion at the 2026 Venice Biennale due to the ongoing war in Ukraine. One week later, Pussy Riot was added to the Rosfinmonitoring list of extremists.

In September 2026, Pussy Riot member Rita Flores claimed that in February 2023, she had been forced by the FSB to agree to inform on the activities of fellow anti-government activists. They threatened to open a criminal case against her under wartime censorship laws over criticisms she had made of Russian killings in Ukraine.They also suggested they could arrange for her mother to be killed. Flores said that she had cooperated with the FSB for three years before escaping from Russia and that she had eventually been asked to help with a plot to kidnap and murder a Kremlin enemy.

== In popular culture ==
Tolokonnikova and Alyokhina appeared in House of Cards season 3, episode 3, as themselves. The episode also features Pussy Riot concert footage. Tolokonnikova appeared in artist Fawn Rogers' "I Love You And That Makes Me God". In 2016, the Norwegian songwriter Moddi released a cover version in English of "Punk Prayer" in his album Unsongs. The costume for Emilia Clarke's comic book protagonist Maya from "Mother of Madness" is based on the balaclavas of Pussy Riot. Riot Symphony: The Sun Still Shines by Conor Mitchell is a musical with Ulster Orchestra based on Pussy Riot, Sinéad O'Connor, & Sophie Scholl.

== Discography ==
Albums

- CYKA (2026)

Bootleg recordings

- Ubey seksista ("Kill the sexist")
- In Riot We Trust (2017)

Mixtapes

- Matriarchy Now (2022)

== Awards, honors, and nominations ==
Award	Year	Nominee(s)	Category	Result	Ref.
Soratnik Prize	2012			Won	
Kandinsky Prize	2012			Nominated	
Berlin Music Video Awards	2019	"My Sex"	Best Animation	Nominated	
Berlin Music Video Awards	2021	"Panic Attack"	Best Experimental	Nominated	
Music Video Festival	2021	"Panic Attack"	Innovation	Nominated	
Woody Guthrie Prize	2023			Won	

In 2019, Time created 89 new covers to celebrate women of the year starting from 1920; it chose Pussy Riot for 2012.

== See also ==
- 1950 Notre-Dame Affair
- MediaZona – Russian online media outlet
