= Yuliia Fedosiuk =

Ukrainian civil activist

- Юлія Федосюк
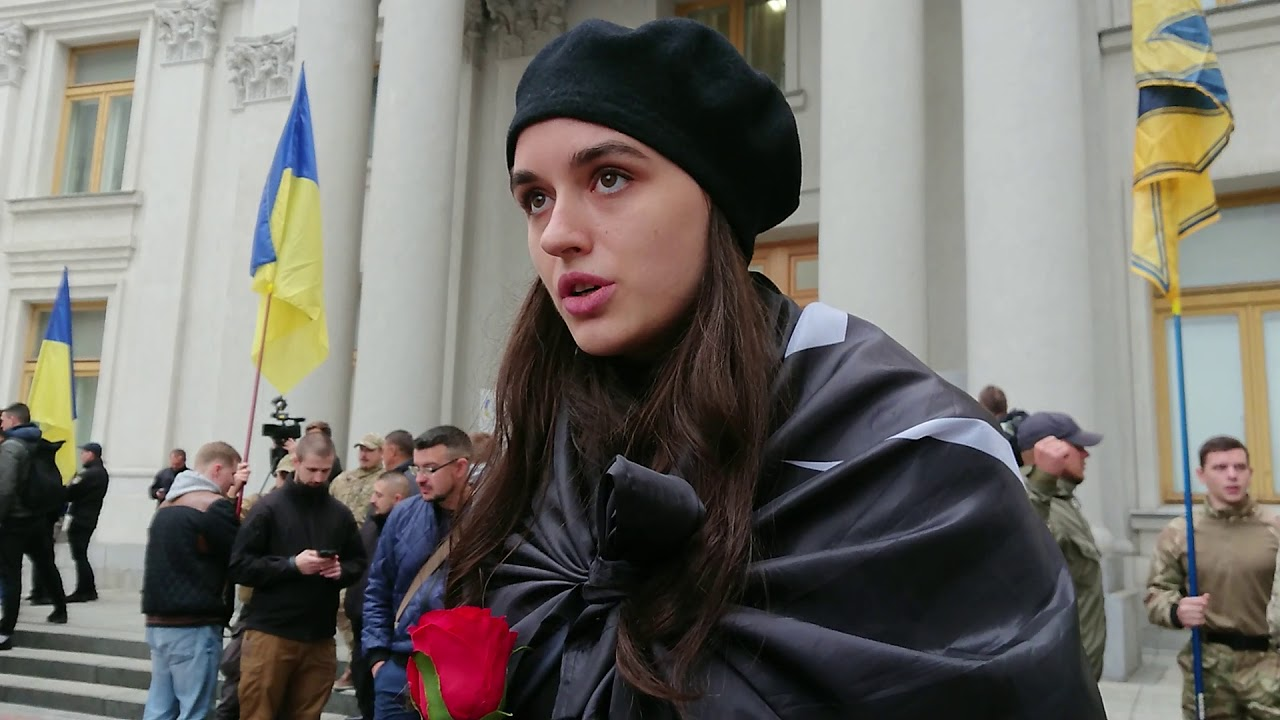
- Fedosiuk in 2019
- Born: 1993 (age 32–33); Lviv, Ukraine
- Spouse: Arsenii Fedosiuk

Yuliia Volodymyrivna Fedosiuk (Ukrainian: Юлія Володимирівна Федосюк, born in 1993) is a Ukrainian philosopher and religious scholar and civic activist. Head of the public organization "Silver Rose".

== Biography ==
She studied philosophy.

She worked as a curator of an educational project at the library of the Plomin lecture hall. Assistant to MP Sviatoslav Yurash in the Verkhovna Rada of Ukraine.

At the Association of Azovstal Defenders' Families, she advocates for Ukrainian prisoners of war at the international level.

On 11 May 2022, Yuliia Fedosiuk and Kateryna Prokopenko met with Pope Francis in the Vatican and asked him to help save Ukrainian defenders from Azovstal in Mariupol, Donetsk Oblast. She spoke in the United States Congress, Stanford University, the Israeli Knesset, and at other public events calling for the return of the Mariupol defenders home.

== Personal life ==
She has been married to Arsenii Fedosiuk since 2017.
