= Diana Burkot =

Diana Burkot Диана Буркот
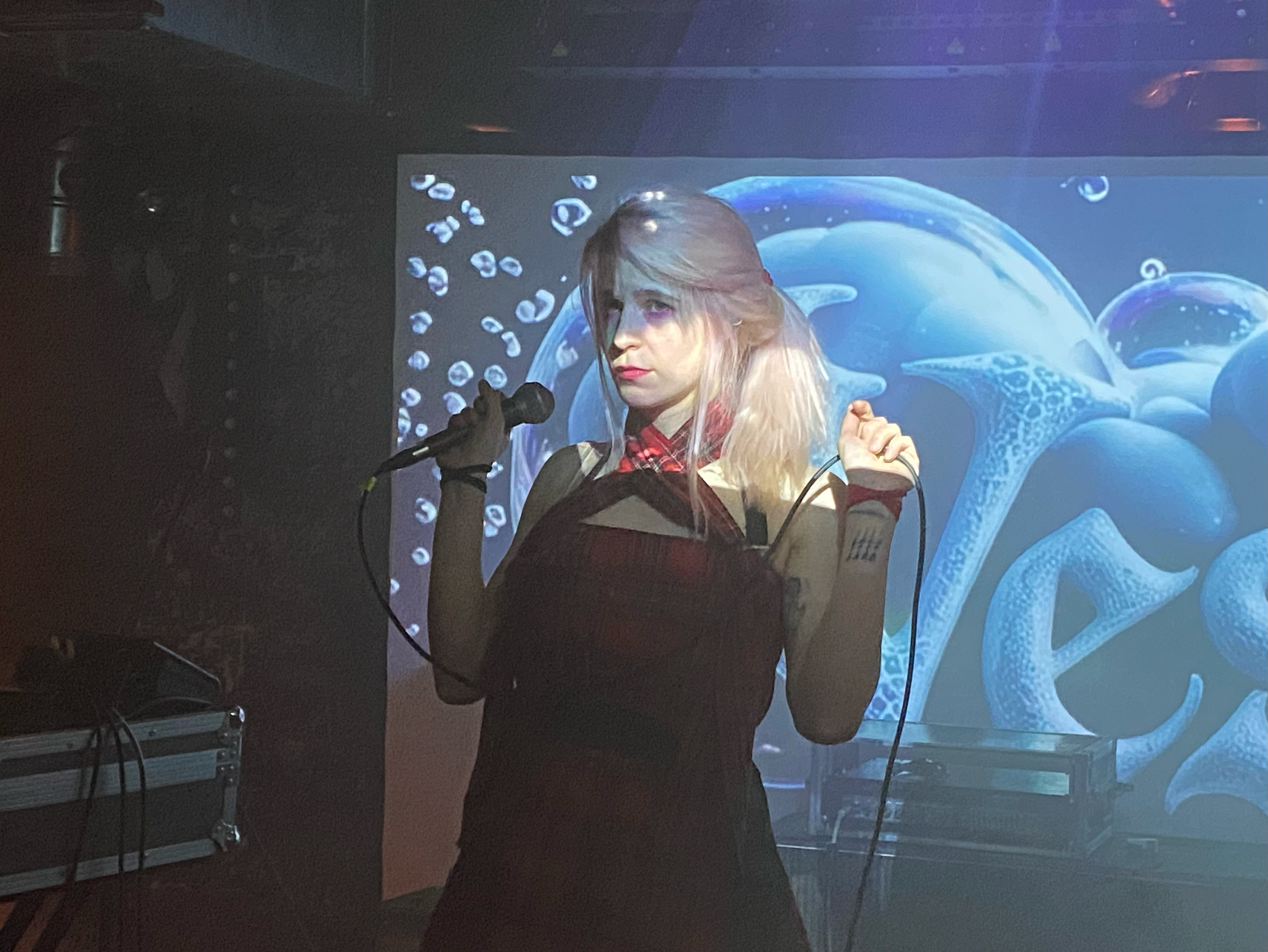
- Burkot in 2025

Background information
- Born: March 16, 1985 (age 41)
- Occupations: Artist, musician
- Member of: Rosemary Loves a Blackberry, Pussy Riot
- Formerly of: Fanny Kaplan

Diana Yurievna Burkot (born March 16, 1985) is a Russian artist and musician, known for her bands Rosemary Loves a Blackberry as well as being a member of the punk collective Pussy Riot. As part of the Pussy Riot collective, she participated in the "Punk Prayer" action at Cathedral of Christ the Savior, being the only member of the group who remained anonymous, until the statute of limitations in the criminal case expired.

== Biography ==
Burkot was born in Lyubertsy, USSR on March 16, 1985. In 2003, she attended the Moscow College of Improvisational Music, majoring in percussion instruments, from which she graduated in 2008.

At the end of 2012 she entered the Rodchenko Moscow School of Photography and Multimedia, where she studied in the program of multimedia art and video art until 2015.

== Political activism ==
According to Diana, she met the members of Pussy Riot at a rehearsal, where she herself was working on music, and following a tip from mutual friends, began writing arrangements for them. At the invitation of Yekaterina Samutsevich and Nadezhda Tolokonnikova, she took part in the group's performance at the Red Square.

Together with Maria Alyokhina, Nadezhda Tolokonnikova and Yekaterina Samutsevich, she took part in the Pussy Riot "Punk Prayer / Mother of God, drive Putin away!" action which took place on February 21, 2012, in the Cathedral of Christ the Savior. The event caused a wide public outcry which escalated into a criminal case. Burkot, unlike the other participants, managed to maintain anonymity and avoid criminal prosecution. After the statute of limitations in the criminal case had expired, her identity was revealed in an interview by Nadezhda Tolokonnikova.

Starting in 2018, she launched a project consisting of a series of video statements under the general title "Blood and sweat", filmed together with video artist Ekaterina Frolova. The project in the form of video installations was demonstrated in Multimedia Art Museum, Moscow and the Garage Museum in 2018–2019, as well as in the Svigroom Gallery in Reykjavík in 2023.

On October 15, 2020, she was detained by the police in connection with her participation in the anti-homophobia rally held by Pussy Riot. In the evening of the same day, she was released from the police station with a report on violation of the rules of participation in the rally.

In September 2025, Burkot was sentenced to eight years imprisonment in absentia, prosecuted alongside fellow Pussy Riot members Olga Borisova, Taso Pletner, Alina Petrova, and Maria Alyokina for spreading "false information" about the Russian Armed Forces murdering Ukrainian civilians in a December 2022 music video titled "Mama, Don't Watch TV." About the sentence, Burkot told Far Out Magazine that she "stand[s] by every single word" and confirmed her involvement in the video.

== Awards ==
- Woody Guthrie Prize (2023)
- Honorary Doctor of Letters (2023) – University of Kent
- Sergey Kuryokhin Contemporary Art Award – Nominated (2017)

== Discography ==
Fanny Kaplan (Фанни Каплан)

- Пластилин (2014)
- Self-titled (2016)

rosemary loves a blackberry

- ❤️ (2017)
- snowfake (2018)
- weirdberry ext. (2020–2021)
- +4 (2022)

Wardra

- Ancestor of the New World (2018)
