= Veronika Nikulshina =

Russian artist and activist (born 1997)

- Born: May 28, 1997 (age 28); Moscow, Russia
- Occupations: Artist, Activist

Veronika "Nika" Nikulshina (born 28 May 1997) is a Russian artist and activist known for being a member of Pussy Riot and being arrested while protesting on the field at the 2018 FIFA World Cup. She acted as a spokesperson for Pyotr Verzilov after his reported poisoning months later. She has been subject to arrest by Russian authorities' numerous times, leading to her fleeing Russia to Georgia.

== Biography ==
Veronica Nikulshina was born in Moscow. She studied economics at Plekhanov Russian University of Economics.

From 2018, she became a member of the artist group Pussy Riot and participated in a number of actions. After many arrests and citing harassment, she fled to Georgia in 2022. She is currently in Tbilisi, Georgia, despite being turned away once in 2022.

== Arrests and actions ==
=== FIFA World Cup 2018 ===
During the 2018 FIFA World Cup Final, members identifying with Pussy Riot invaded the pitch wearing police uniforms to protest wrongful arrests. They were Verzilov, economics student Veronika Nikulshina, journalist Olga Kurachyova and Olga Pakhtusova. The action happened in front of millions of viewers, including Putin. They were jailed for 15 days for the stunt and banned from sporting events for three years. They were released after 15 days and then detained on new charges but were eventually released from these as well.

2 Months later, in September 2018, Pyotr Verzilov was with Nikulshina when he fell ill and was suspected of being poisoned. Verzilov, another of the members involved in the FIFA pitch, was transferred to a hospital in Berlin, in which doctors found high probability of poisoning. Nikulshina travelled with him to Berlin.

=== 2019 arrests ===
In April 2019, Nikulshina was detained twice in one month, but was not convicted. She was also arrested while heading to the Bolshoi Theatre where her experimental theater show Poe.Tri had been nominated for a Golden Mask (Russian award).

=== Pussy Riot Rainbow Flag Action ===
Oct 2020, an action known as Pussy Riot Rainbow Flag Action putting up LGBTQ Flags around Russian government buildings led to Nikulshina's arrest. The group claimed the action was to "celebrate" Putin's 68th birthday and was a statement on LGBTQ rights in Russia. Nikulshina was detained but let go before the trial.

=== Moscow Victory Day Parade arrest ===
In 2021, police arrested Nikulshina along with Sasha Sofeev, who spent 5 nights in jail according to Pussy Riot social media. The timing of the arrest was around the May 9 Moscow Victory Day Parade, in an alleged attempt to prevent any stunts by the activists. On July 17, 2021, Nikulshina left Russia citing ongoing state persecution.

=== Georgia ===
In 2022, Georgia barred entry to a number of anti-war Russians, including Nikulshina. Free Speech organization PEN America decried this decision, and called into question Georgia's space for free media and expression.

== Recognition ==
- 2019 Nominated for Golden Mask (Russian award) for experimental theater show Poe.Tri
- 2023 Alongside with her Pussy Riot co-members Nika won Woody Guthrie prize for Honoring those who embody the spirit and work of Woody Guthrie.

== See also ==
- Pussy Riot
- Pyotr Verzilov
- Nadya Tolokonnikova
