= Association of Azovstal Defenders' Families =

Ukrainian organization

Association of Azovstal defenders' families
- Асоціація родин захисників «Азовсталі»
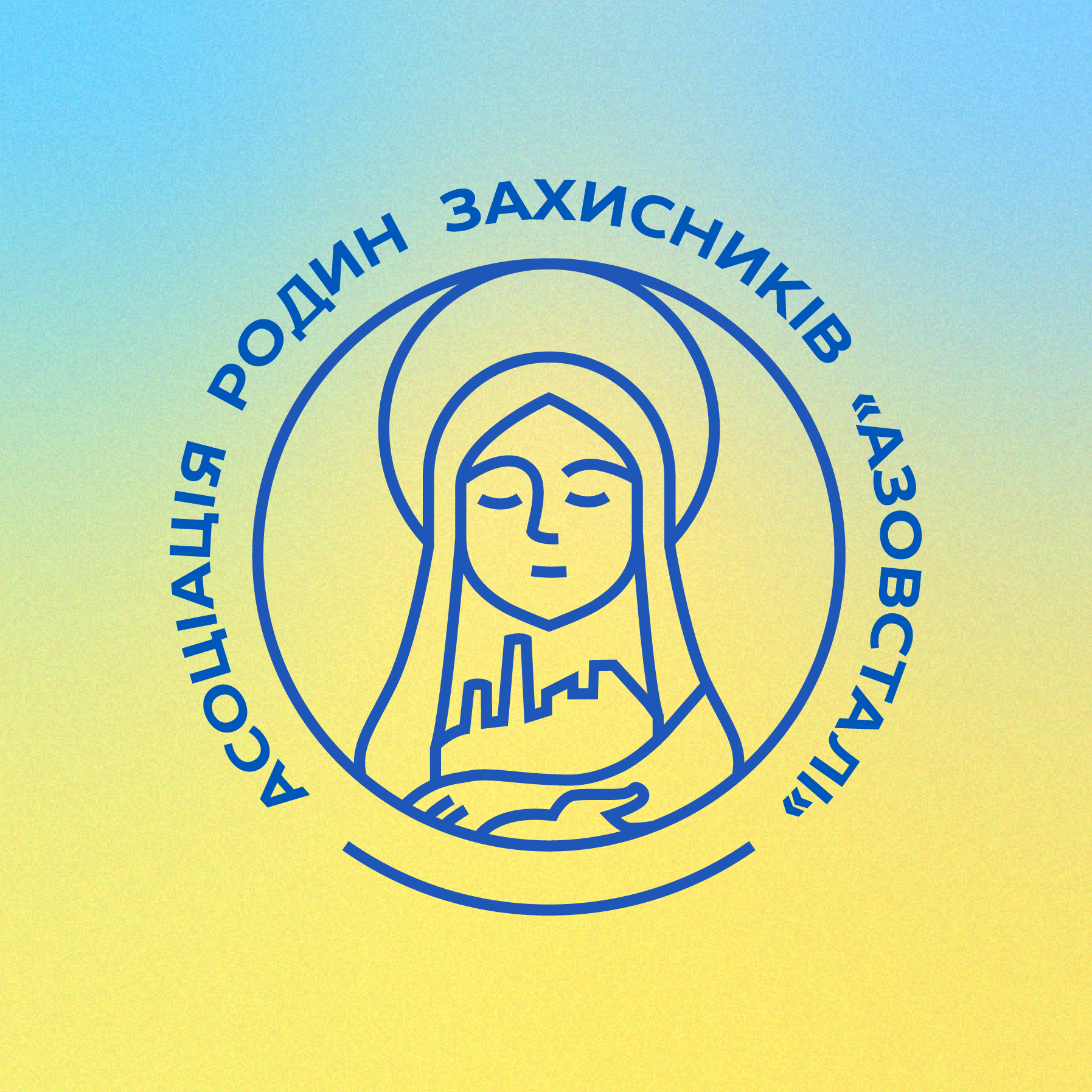
- Formation: June 1, 2022
- Headquarters: Ukraine
- Official language: Ukrainian, English
- Headed: Kateryna Prokopenko
- Website: www.azovstalfamilies.com

The Association of "Azovstal" Defenders' Families (Ukrainian: Асоціація родин захисників «Азовсталі») is an organization founded in 2022 by the families of all of the units defending "Azovstal", which include the "Azov" servicemen, marines, 36th separate brigade of marines, border guard, national guard, police, SBU, territorial defense, and other law enforcement agencies. It is headed by Kateryna Prokopenko.

== History ==
In May 2022 Ukraine's most senior authorities gave the order to surrender Azovstal in Mariupol, and thus 2.5 thousand Ukrainian servicemen ended up in Russian captivity. On June 1 their relatives founded the association to expedite the process of releasing the soldiers from captivity. Members of the association spread the word and pressured the Red Cross and international organizations to fulfill their duties. And so relatives of "Azovstal" defenders organized rallies, communicated with international journalists and organizations, and wrote letters on behalf of the families and the association itself.

End of July a "Finally you're home" project was launched to provide personal humanitarian support to the released defenders. The goal of the project is to address the first-order needs of a person returning from captivity, including psychological support.

In September 2022, the association met representatives of the International Committee of the Red Cross (ICRC) in Washington. 3–4 October — meetings with the UN and ICRC in Geneva. 12 October — meeting with Tiny Kox, the president of the Parliamentary Assembly of the Council of Europe (PACE), presenting in front of the political groups within PACE at the same time.

In September 2022, the association received a "Solidarity" award from El Español, and in January — "UP Award" from Ukrainska Pravda in "Active civil position" nomination. Representing the association at the awards was Kateryna Prokopenko — wife of "Azov" regiment commander Denys "Redis" Prokopenko; during the award acceptance on stage, she cited the letter from her husband, that was written by him specifically for the UP awards ceremony.

Members of the association together with the Ministry of Digital Transformation partook in processes related to unblocking the content associated with "Azov" in Meta, successfully resolved on January 18, 2023.

== Awards ==
- "UP Award" in the "civil position" category from "Ukrainska Pravda" (2022)
- "Solidarity" award from El Español publication (2022)
