= Denys Prokopenko =

Ukrainian military commander (born 1991)

Hero of Ukraine Denys Prokopenko
- Денис Прокопенко
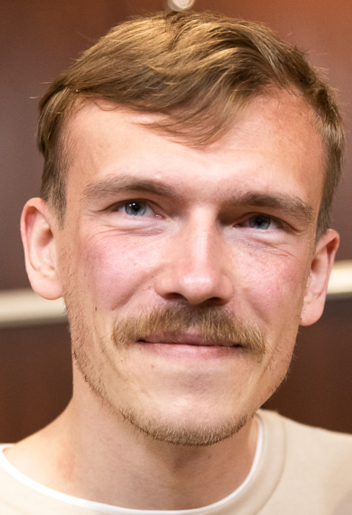
- Prokopenko in 2022

Commander of 1st Azov Corps
- Incumbent
- Assumed office 7 April 2025

Commander of Azov Brigade
- In office 17 July 2023 – 7 April 2025
- Preceded by: Mykyta Nadtochiy
- Succeeded by: Bohdan Hrishenkov
- In office September 2017 – 29 May 2022
- Preceded by: Maksym Zhorin
- Succeeded by: Anatoliy Sidorenko

Personal details
- Born: 20 June 1991 (age 35)
- Spouse: Kateryna Prokopenko
- Education: Kyiv National Linguistic University; National Defence University of Ukraine
- Nickname: Ре́діс (Redis)

Military service
- Allegiance: Ukraine
- Branch/service: National Guard of Ukraine
- Years of service: 2014–present
- Rank: Brigadier general
- Commands: Azov Brigade (2017–2025); 1st Azov Corps (2025–present)
- Battles/wars: Russo-Ukrainian War; War in Donbas; Russian invasion of Ukraine; Siege of Mariupol
- Awards: Hero of Ukraine; Order of Bohdan Khmelnytsky; Medal For Military Service to Ukraine

Denys Hennadiyovych Prokopenko (Note: In this name that follows East Slavic naming customs, the patronymic is Hennadiyovych and the family name is Prokopenko.) (Note: Ukrainian: Дени́с Генна́дійович Прокопе́нко, IPA: [deˈnɪz ɦeˈnːɑd⁽ʲ⁾ijowɪtʃ prokoˈpɛnko].) (born 27 June 1991) is a Ukrainian Brigadier general in the National Guard of Ukraine and commander of the 1st Corps of the Ukrainian National Guard "Azov", as well as a prominent participant of the Russo-Ukrainian War, and former commander of the 12th Special Forces Brigade "Azov".

Prokopenko joined the Azov Battalion in July 2014 to fight in the Donbas war against Pro-Russian separatists. After Azov's founder and leader Andriy Biletsky left the unit to focus on politics, Prokopenko eventually arose to the leadership of the Azov Regiment in 2017 and was promoted to the rank of major, becoming the youngest commander in the Ukrainian military. In response to the full-scale Russian invasion of Ukraine in 2022, Prokopenko rose as a leader defending Mariupol from the Russian siege, and commanded the Mariupol garrison. For his leadership role on the frontlines of the war, he was awarded the title Hero of Ukraine in March 2022. In July 2023 Prokopenko returned to Ukraine in a prisoner exchange and in August he took command of Azov once again. In April 2025 he was promoted to Colonel and became commander of the 1st Azov Corps, a newly created corps formation with four brigades. In February 2026 Prokopenko was promoted to Brigadier general.

Prokopenko is also known as Redis, (Note: Ukrainian: Ре́діс, IPA: [ˈrɛd⁽ʲ⁾is]; Russian: Ре́дис, romanized: Rédis, IPA: [ˈrʲedʲɪs] (proper noun with stress on the first syllable—thus, contrary to some mistranslations, contrastive with реди́с, redís, 'radish', which is stressed on the final syllable).) an old football ultra nickname that became his military call sign. His subordinates are reported to address him informally as "Brother Redis" or "Comrade Redis". (Note: Ukrainian: «Дру́же Ре́діс», romanized: «Drúzhe Rédis», IPA: [ˈdruʒe ˈrɛd⁽ʲ⁾is], lit. 'Friend Redis'.)

== Biography ==
Since childhood, he has been involved in sports, notably football and martial arts. Together with his wife, he also been involved in skiing, claiming a personal record is 91 km/h. Before the start of the Russian-Ukrainian war, he was an active fan and ultra-supporter of the Kyiv football club Dynamo. He was a member of the far-right White Boys Club football fan (known as "ultras") organization of the football club Dynamo Kyiv.

He graduated from the Department of Germanic Philology at Kyiv National Linguistic University, where he earned a degree with a specialty in teaching English.

In 2020, he entered the National Defense University of Ukraine (Command and Staff Institute for the Use of Troops), specializing in Combat Use and Control of Military Units of Mechanized and Tank Troops.

=== Military career ===
==== War in Donbas ====
From 11 July 2014 Prokopenko has participated in the war in Donbas, initially as an enlisted soldier and then as leader of a platoon and a company. In a July 2016 interview he described improvements in the military capabilities of his troops: “Although we lost a lot of experienced guys from the old squad, we've grown in quantity and quality. Discipline and combat efficiency have improved. We used to run with bobby pistols and sawn-off shots; now we have opportunities to work with tactical tank groups, armored vehicles, artillery support. We gradually developed our military science doctrine—starting with practice, not theory. In the course of training and fighting, the lads mastered tactics and small arms proficiency. Many new possibilities opened for us: we can operate independently on the frontlines, free of other subunits that constantly let us down in combat operations.” In September 2017 he was promoted to the rank of major and given control of the Azov Regiment, becoming the youngest commander in the Armed Forces of Ukraine.

==== Defence of Mariupol ====
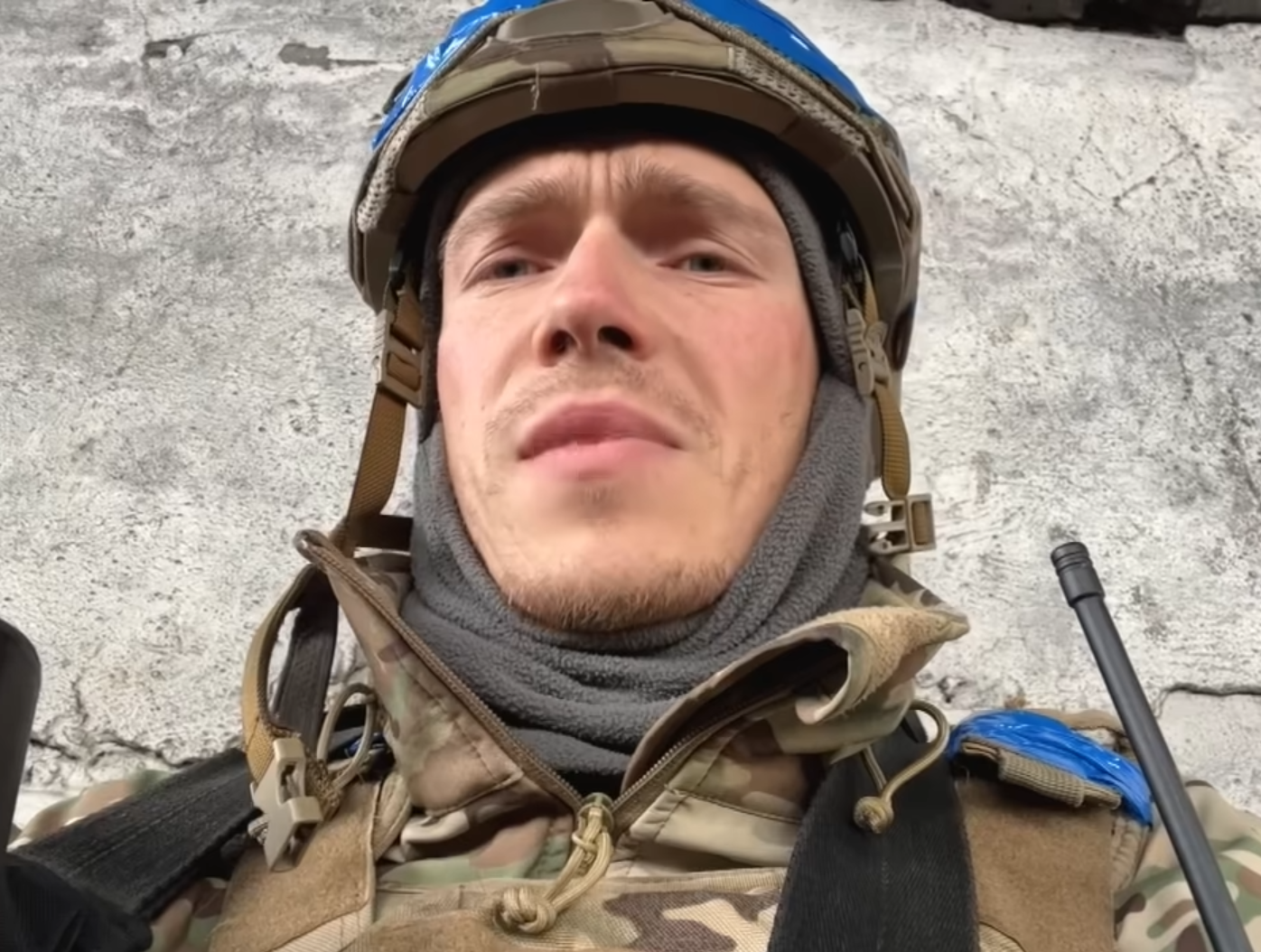
During the 2022 Siege of Mariupol, Major Prokopenko recorded a video message on 7 March exhorting the international community to establish a no-fly zone over Ukraine, and warning of an impending humanitarian crisis.

Following the full-scale Russian invasion of Ukraine, Prokopenko recorded a video message on 7 March 2022 in which he called for closing the skies over Ukraine to help avert humanitarian collapse in Mariupol, since “the enemy is breaking the rules of the war by shelling the civilian people and destroying the infrastructure of the city; the enemy is subjecting Mariupol to another genocide.”

On 19 March 2022, President Volodymyr Zelenskyy awarded the title Hero of Ukraine to the commanders of two units that led the defense of Mariupol: Prokopenko and the commander of the 36th Separate Marine Brigade, Colonel Volodymyr Baranyuk. Major Denis Prokopenko received the highest honor “for bravery, for effective tactics to repel enemy attacks, and for protection of the hero city of Mariupol.”

On 12 April 2022, Prokopenko appeared in a video message, to report on charges that Russian chemical weapons had been dropped onto Mariupol in a drone attack: “Yesterday the occupiers used a poisonous substance of unknown origin against military and civilians in Mariupol. The epicenter of the attack was not near the people, so contact with the substance was minimal, which possibly saved lives—but there are still consequences. Currently it's impossible to find out what substance poisoned people, because we are under complete blockade, and the site of the attack is under fire by the Russians to hide evidence of their crime.” Regardless of the sudden international focus on the chemical attack, he went on to claim that thousands of civilians in the city had been killed and continued to be slaughtered by constant ongoing Russian airstrikes, naval bombardment, heavy flamethrower systems, artillery, and phosphorus munitions. On 13 April 2022, it was confirmed by the official Twitter account of the Azov regiment that Prokopenko was promoted to the rank of lieutenant colonel.

On 11 May 2022, Pope Francis met in the Vatican with the wives of Azov Regiment soldiers Kateryna Prokopenko and Yulia Fedosiuk. On 16 May 2022, a social media post was released by Prokopenko stating: "In order to save lives, the entire Mariupol garrison is implementing the approved decision of the Supreme Military Command and hopes for the support of the Ukrainian people." This statement follows Russia's decision to "evacuate" wounded Ukrainian soldiers from the Azovstal plant and for them to be taken to the DPR-controlled town of Novoazovsk for treatment.

==== Captivity ====
On 20 May 2022, he surrendered to the Russian military along with the last defenders of the Azovstal plant, after stating in a final video message on Telegram: "The higher military command has given the order to save the lives of the soldiers of our garrison and to stop defending the city." Since the Russian Duma was attempting to classify Azov as a terrorist organization, the question of whether Russia considered Prokopenko as a prisoner of war (POW) remained in doubt. On 24 May, his wife Kateryna confirmed that he was in Russian captivity and that she had been able to talk to him on the phone.

==== Exchange ====
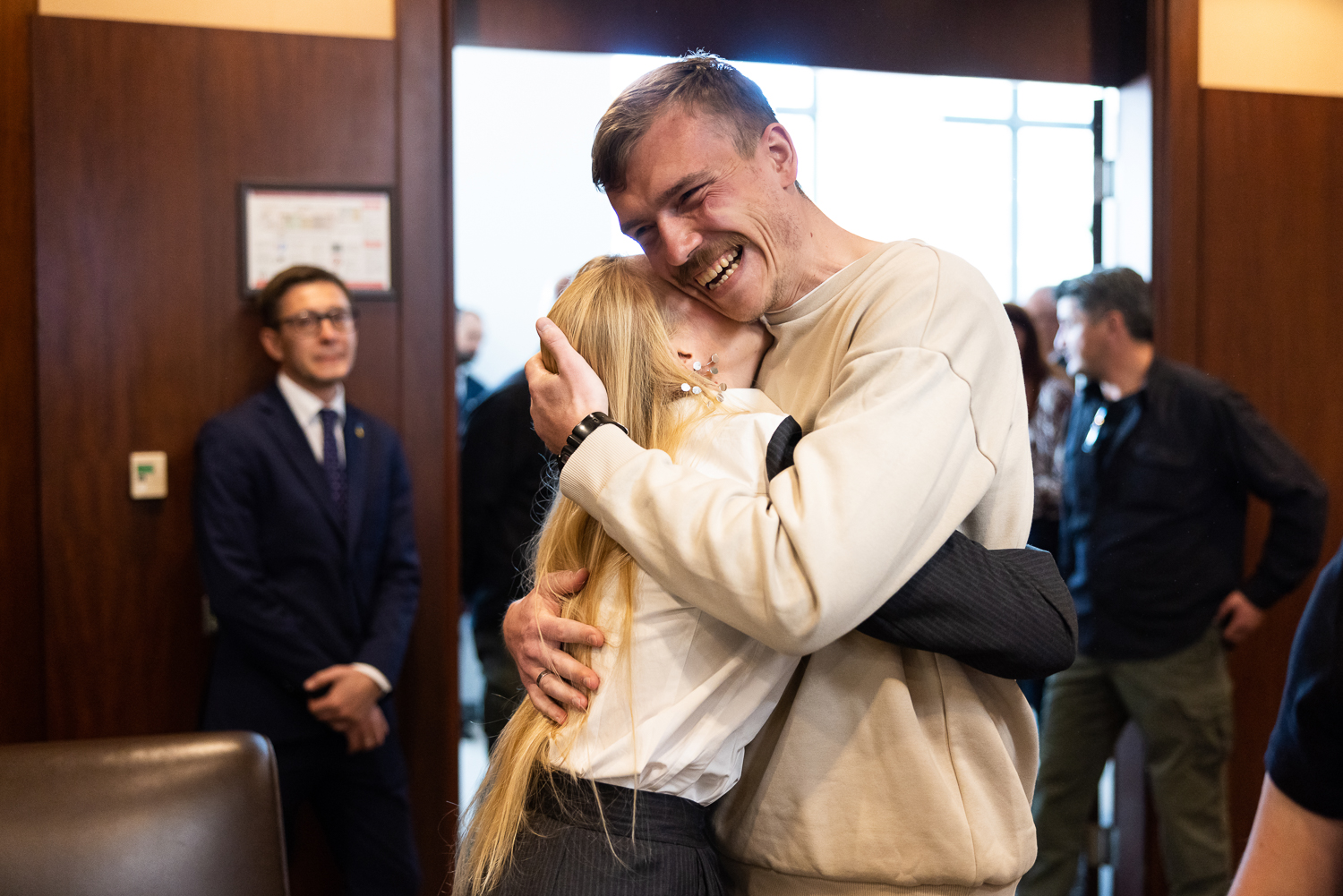
Denys Prokopenko embracing his wife Kateryna in Turkey, October 2022

On 21 September 2022, Prokopenko was released in a prisoner swap. Under the agreement, Prokopenko and four other top Ukrainian commanders from the Azovstal siege were required to stay in Turkey until the end of the war.

In a May 2023 interview, Kateryna Prokopenko gave details of her husband's stay in Turkey: "They are at a closed security facility. Even we do not know where exactly. They are not at a resort or sea. They have a certain regime, regulated calls, a schedule. They are not being tortured like in Russia, but, nevertheless, they are not completely free." She said that while she was grateful for the deal that got Denys out of Russian captivity, she expressed hope that he would return to Ukraine soon.

==== Return to Ukraine ====
On 8 July 2023, Ukrainian president Volodymyr Zelenskyy announced that Azov commanders had been brought back to Ukraine from Turkey, posting a video of five Azov commanders boarding his plane, including Prokopenko. On 17 July, in a press release by Azov, Prokopenko announced he would resume his military service, and return to command of the Azov Brigade.

==== Return to Azov ====
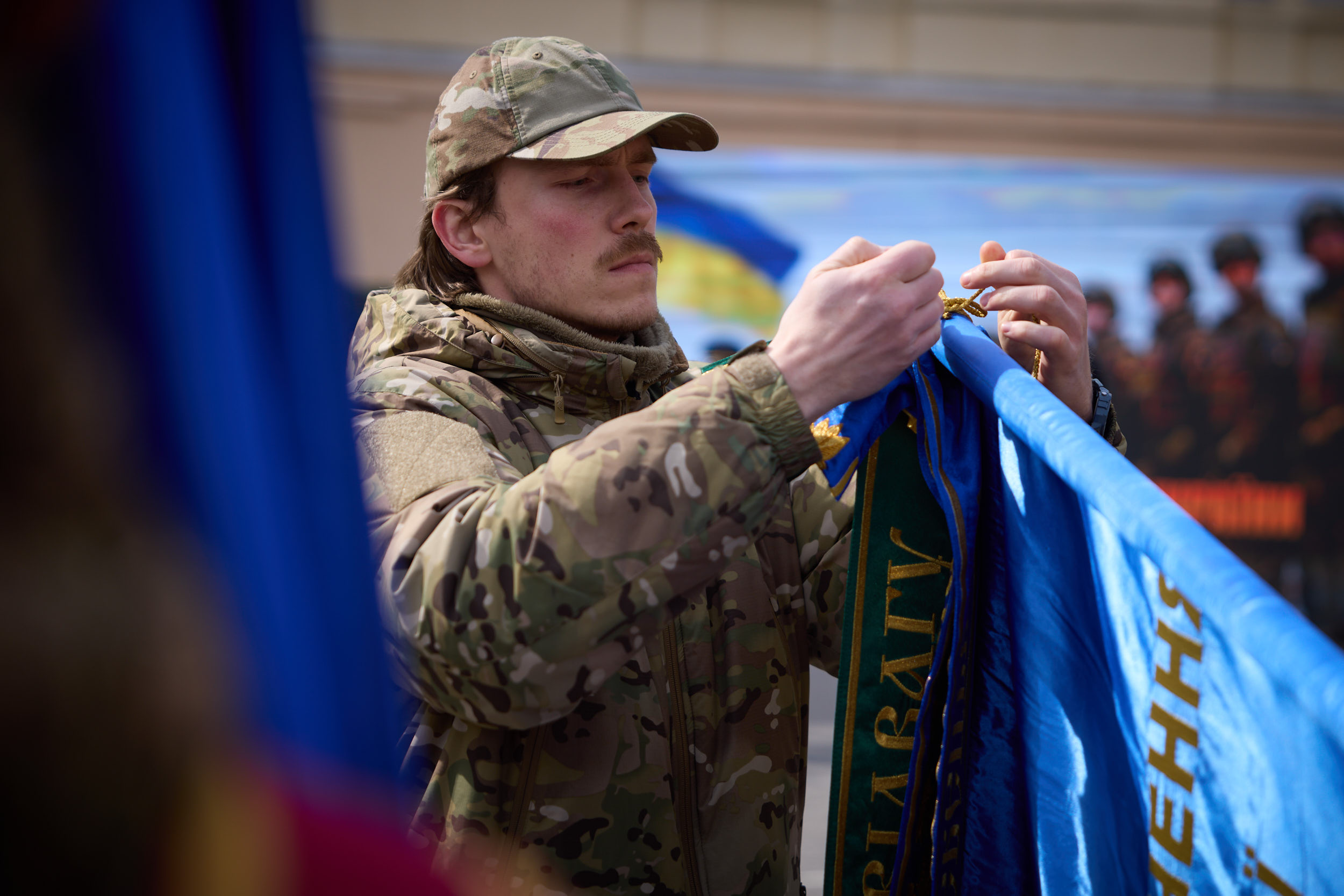
Prokopenko in March 2024 in a ceremony of the 10th anniversary of the National Guard of Ukraine

On 4 August 2023, Prokopenko took part in tactical exercises of the personnel. On 23 August 2023, Azov's press service published a photo of "Redis" at the command post on the front line holding a flag on the occasion of a national holiday. Since August 2023, the Azov brigade under the command of Prokopenko has been performing combat missions in the Lyman direction in the area of the Serebryansky forest. In the first weeks, the unit managed to advance Ukrainian positions with minimal losses.

In April 2025 Prokopenko was promoted to colonel and given command of the 1st Corps of the Ukrainian National Guard "Azov", a corps which includes the Azov Brigade along with four other National Guard brigades (1st Presidential Operational Brigade, 14th Chervona Kalyna Brigade, 15th Operational Brigade and the 20th Operational Brigade "Lyubart"). This move is part of a broader military reform within Ukraine, aiming to enhance the structure and operational effectiveness of its armed forces.

On 25 February 2026 he was promoted to Brigadier general.

On 26 August President Zelenskyy stated that two restructured military groupings led by Prokopenko and Andriy Biletsky would strengthen Ukrainian positions in Donetsk Oblast.

== Controversy ==
On July 30, 2024, the Communist Party of Bohemia and Moravia MEP Kateřina Konečná described Prokopenko as "a neo-Nazi and football hooligan of Dynamo Kyiv" when she complained to Jan Lipavský, the Czech Foreign Affairs Minister, about a visit to Prague by the 3rd Assault Brigade and former Azov soldiers.

Journalist and critic of the Azov Battalion Lev Golinkin wrote for The Nation, arguing that Prokopenko "came out of the White Boys Club", a right-wing group of Dynamo Kyiv fans whose Facebook posts Golinkin said included praise for Holocaust perpetrators and Waffen-SS insignia. Golinkin also claimed that during Prokopenko's time in Azov, his platoon was nicknamed "Borodach Division", and the platoon's insignia was the SS Totenkopf, a popular neo-Nazi symbol. Anatoly Grablevsky of The Spectator has written that "in spite of appearing to like the aesthetics, Prokopenko has denied that he or the men serving under him have far-right sympathies." British pollster and former Conservative politician Michael Ashcroft has defended Prokopenko against charges of far-right sympathies, describing the allegations as Russian propaganda and describing Prokopenko as "one of the most legendary figures of the 21st century."

== Family ==
Denys Prokopenko is a descendant of ethnic Karelians. Prokopenko today considers his fight to defend Ukraine against Russian imperialism from Moscow a personal matter, closely intertwined with his own family history:

"It feels like I continued the same war, only on another section of the front, a war against the occupation regime of the Kremlin. My grandfather had such a terrible hatred for communism, for Bolshevism, for the Sovok... Can you imagine what it's like to lose your family? I mean, all his brothers perished, his kinfolk...".

He is married to Kateryna Prokopenko.

== Awards and recognition ==
- The title Hero of Ukraine conferred with the distinction of the "Order of the Gold Star" (19 March 2022) – for personal courage and heroism shown in defense of the state sovereignty and territorial integrity of Ukraine, and fidelity to his military oath
- Order of Bohdan Khmelnytsky, III Class (24 August 2019) – for major personal contributions to strengthening the national defense capabilities of the Ukrainian nation, courage shown during hostilities, exemplary performance of official duties and high degree of professionalism
- Medal For Military Service to Ukraine (25 March 2015) – awarded to Junior Lieutenant Prokopenko for individual bravery and high degree of professionalism shown in defense of the state sovereignty and territorial integrity of Ukraine

In October 2022, he was included in the list of the 25 most influential Ukrainian servicemen by NV. In November 2023, he was included in the list of leaders of Ukraine by UP-100.
