= Fawn Rogers =

American multimedia artist

Fawn Rogers is an American multimedia artist based in Los Angeles who works in painting, sculpture, video, installation, and site-specific projects. Her practice merges realism with conceptualism. She is known for large-scale oil paintings of oysters and organic forms that address humanity's relationship with the natural world through the intersecting lenses of desire, extraction, and ecological consequence. Her work has been featured in publications including Observer, Dazed, The American Scholar, and the South China Morning Post.

Rogers has described the current geological era as "one giant crime scene", positioning her practice as an ongoing inquiry into harmony, conflict, and accountability between human systems and the environment. Her work has been exhibited internationally across museums, galleries, art fairs, and nontraditional venues, including site-specific installations in commercial, institutional, and public contexts.

== Work ==
Rogers's practice uses symbolic natural forms and industrial materials to examine power within both human and ecological systems, engaging with tensions between creation and destruction, eroticism and extinction, and the human and the natural world. Artnet described her work as part of a broader movement of eco-surrealism emerging from the Los Angeles art scene.

The oyster operates as a central motif across her painting, video, and installation work. In Dazed, her paintings were described as linking eroticism and ecofeminism with environmental degradation, using marine imagery to address systems of consumption and exploitation. Grazia featured her work in the context of the oyster's longstanding cultural resonance as symbol of desire and ecological significance. Country and Town House included her marine paintings in a survey of coastal artworks engaging critically with the natural world. In her ongoing series The World Is Your Oyster, exhibited at venues including Galerie Marguo in Paris and Lauren Powell Projects in Los Angeles, large-scale oil paintings engage the oyster's contradictory iconography: a symbol simultaneously of chastity, fertility, and sacred knowledge, and of carnal pleasure, decadence, and greed. Oysters are hermaphroditic, beginning life as males and developing into females across their life cycle. The oyster's capacity to produce nacre around an irritant is central to Rogers's inquiry into what natural systems produce on their own terms and what is lost when humans attempt to own that process.

Writing in Observer, critics noted her engagement with themes of extraction and human intervention in natural processes. The American Scholar situated her practice within broader questions of ecological accountability and the symbolic resonance of natural materials in contemporary art. The South China Morning Post highlighted the sensual yet critical framing of her shellfish imagery. Overstandard described her practice as an inquiry into responsibility, desire, and ecological consequence.

Her sculptural and installation work extends these concerns into other materials and contexts. Car Meat repurposes accident-impacted car hoods as butchered cuts of meat, drawing connections between capitalist consumption and environmental destruction. The GODOG series addresses sexual repression and the human impulse to exercise creative and destructive power.

Love Letters to Costanza Bonarelli, exhibited at Galerie Marguo in partnership with K11 Musea in Hong Kong in 2023, is a painting series paying tribute to Costanza Bonarelli, the 17th-century lover of sculptor Gianlorenzo Bernini, who ordered her face slashed in a fit of jealousy. Rogers casts Bonarelli as a patron saint of patriarchy's unjust hypocrisies, imagining her illuminated in the cosmos as a series of comets dispatched on behalf of history's unfairly exploited and punished.

I Love You and That Makes Me God is an ongoing multidisciplinary project begun in 2012 spanning street art, video, public installation, painting, and sculpture. A notable iteration was a 50-story LED installation on the American Eagle Building in Times Square in 2014. A subsequent version at M+B Gallery in Los Angeles included a two-channel video installation encased in a large-scale sculpture made from plaster, dirt, and Ferrari car paint. An earlier body of work, the Visible Light series, was covered by PBS SoCal's Artbound.

== Exhibitions ==
Rogers has exhibited her work in galleries and art fairs across the United States and internationally, with coverage in Hypebae noting presentations in Los Angeles, New York, Miami, and Paris. Wallpaper profiled Rogers as a Los Angeles-based artist whose work spans painting, sculpture, and site-specific installation. Her 2015 exhibition COURT at Select Fair in New York was covered by Artnet News. Her 2017 solo exhibition Violent Garden at The Lodge in Hollywood was reviewed by Whitehot Magazine as a striking debut in the Los Angeles gallery scene. Her 2022 solo exhibition Your Perfect Plastic Heart at Wilding Cran Gallery in Los Angeles was reviewed in Artillery Magazine, in Art Now LA, which described her oyster paintings as sensual and formally commanding, and on KCRW, which described the paintings as glamorous shrines to the female body. Her 2023 exhibition Burn, Gleam, Shine at K11 Musea in Hong Kong was covered in the Beijing Times, which described it as a dialogue on humanity's ecological footprint. Her 2023 exhibition Come Ruin or Rapture at Galerie Marguo in Paris was featured in Ocula. Her 2023 group exhibition Boil Toil & Trouble was reviewed by Whitehot Magazine. Her 2024 solo exhibition Everything is Sacred Nothing is Precious; Everything is Precious Nothing is Sacred at MAKE ROOM in Los Angeles was recommended by Whitehot Magazine.

Recent solo exhibitions include Everything is Sacred Nothing is Precious; Everything is Precious Nothing is Sacred at MAKE ROOM in Los Angeles (2024); Come Ruin or Rapture at Galerie Marguo in Paris (2023); GODOG at Lauren Powell Projects in Los Angeles (2023); Burn, Gleam, Shine at Galerie Marguo and K11 Musea in Hong Kong (2023); Love Letters to Costanza Bonarelli at Galerie Marguo and K11 Musea in Hong Kong (2023); and Your Perfect Plastic Heart at Wilding Cran Gallery in Los Angeles (2022).

Recent group exhibitions include Mother Nature in the Bardo at BlackBook Highline Nine Galleries in New York (2025); COHJU at Galerie Marguo in Kyoto (2025); Deli Dali at Galerie Marguo in Paris (2025); TheWrap Book The Art of Television at Nicodim Gallery in Los Angeles (2025); Ten Years at Wilding Cran Gallery in Los Angeles (2024); Beach at Nino Mier Gallery in New York (2023); L.A. Woman at Phillips in Los Angeles (2023); Art Paris at Galerie Marguo (2023); My Body, My Business at Sotheby's in New York (2023); Boil Toil & Trouble at Art In Common in Chicago and Los Angeles (2023); My Condolences at M+B Gallery in Los Angeles (2023); Solitude at Nexx Taipei in Taiwan (2023); Boil Toil & Trouble at Art In Common in Miami (2022); You Me Me You at Nicodim Gallery in Los Angeles (2022); Holy Water at Eric Firestone Gallery in East Hampton (2022); and Don't Give Me Flowers at Praz-Delvallade in Los Angeles (2022).
