= Kateryna Prokopenko =

Ukrainian illustrator (born 1995)

- Катерина Прокопенко
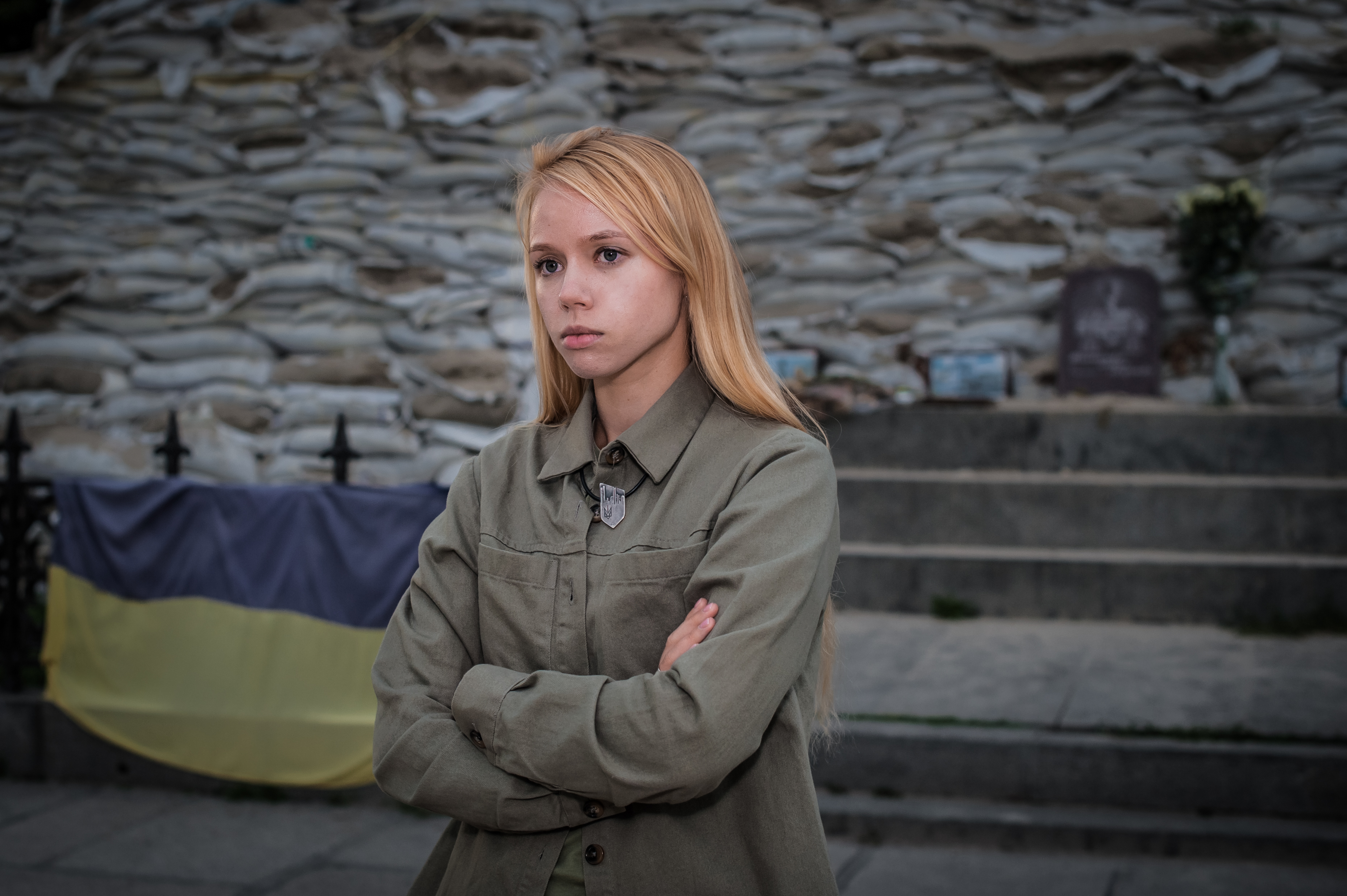
- Kateryna Prokopenko, August 2022
- Born: 1995 (age 30–31); Kyiv, Ukraine
- Spouse: Denys Prokopenko

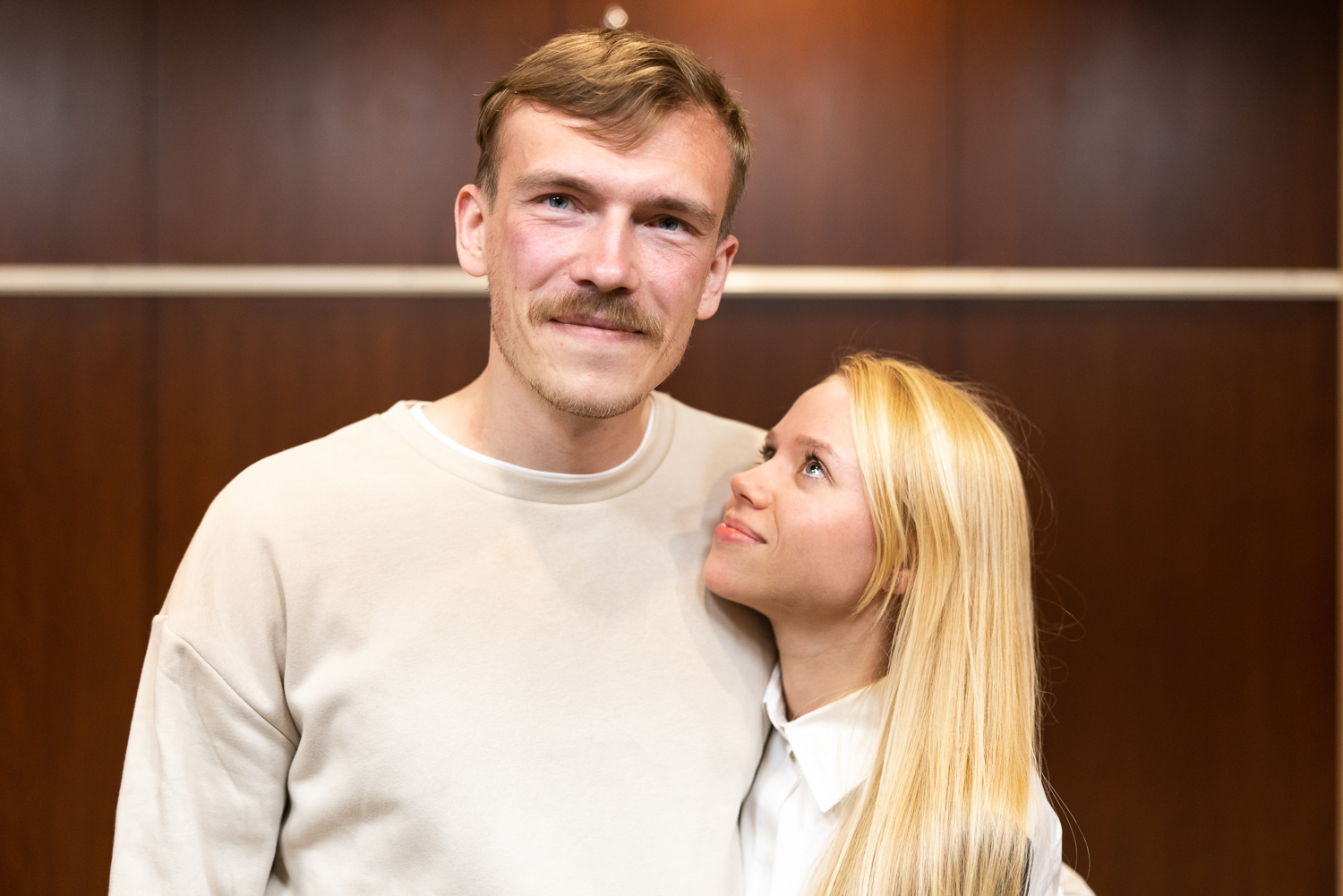
Kateryna and Denys Prokopenko, October 2022

Kateryna Serhiivna Prokopenko (Ukrainian: Катерина Сергіївна Прокопенко; born 1995) is a Ukrainian illustrator, public activist, and volunteer. She is head of the Association of Azovstal Defenders' Families NGO and the "'Azovstal' Defenders' Families support" charitable fund. She is married to Denys Prokopenko.

== Biography ==
Kateryna Prokopenko was born in Kyiv, Ukraine, in 1995.

She met Denys Prokopenko in 2015, and married him in 2019.

=== Russian invasion of Ukraine ===
Before Russia's full-scale invasion of Ukraine, she worked as an illustrator (creative pseudonym "Koza rohata"). Later she started volunteering.

On 11 May 2022, Kateryna Prokopenko and Yuliia Fedosiuk met Pope Francis in the Vatican and addressed him with a plea to help in saving Ukrainian defenders from "Azovstal" in Mariupol in Donetsk Oblast. After the Ukrainian servicemen were captured by the Russians, Kateryna, together with other "azovtsi" (Azovian) families, put all their efforts towards returning them home.

23 March 2023, Prokopenko filed a petition on the president's website asking to dedicate the day of 20 May to commemorate the defenders of Mariupol. As of 7 June, the petition accumulated 27,000 signatures.
