= Why We Fight (2005 film) =

- Theatrical poster
- Directed by: Eugene Jarecki
- Written by: Eugene Jarecki
- Produced by: Susannah Shipman
- Starring: Joseph Cirincione; Richard Perle; Chalmers Johnson; John McCain
- Cinematography: Etienne Sauret; May Ying Welsh
- Edited by: Nancy Kennedy
- Music by: Robert Miller
- Production companies: ARTE; BBC Storyville; CBC; Charlotte Street Films; TV2 Danmark
- Distributed by: Sony Pictures Classics (US); Axiom Films (UK & Ireland)
- Release dates: January 2005 (Sundance); January 22, 2006 (United States)
- Running time: 98 minutes
- Countries: Canada; France; United Kingdom; United States
- Language: English
- Box office: $1.4 million

Why We Fight is a 2005 documentary film by Eugene Jarecki about the military–industrial complex. The title refers to the World War II–era eponymous propaganda films commissioned by the U.S. Government to justify their decision to enter the war against the Axis powers.

Why We Fight was first screened at the Sundance Film Festival on January 17, 2005, exactly forty-four years after President Dwight D. Eisenhower's farewell address. Although it won the Grand Jury Prize for Documentary, the film received a limited public cinema release on January 22, 2006. It also won one of the 2006 Grimme Awards in the competition "Information & Culture"; the prize is one of Germany's most prestigious for television productions and a Peabody Award in 2006.

== Synopsis ==
Why We Fight describes the rise and maintenance of the United States military–industrial complex and its 50-year involvement with the wars led by the United States to date, especially its 2003 invasion of Iraq. The documentary asserts that in every decade since World War II, the American public was misled so that the government (incumbent Administration) could take them to war and fuel the military-industrial economy maintaining American political dominance in the world. Interviewed about this matter are politician John McCain, political scientist and former CIA analyst Chalmers Johnson, politician Richard Perle, neoconservative commentator William Kristol, writer Gore Vidal, and public policy expert Joseph Cirincione.

Why We Fight documents the consequences of said foreign policy with the stories of a Vietnam War veteran whose son was killed in the September 11, 2001 attacks, and who then asked the military to write the name of his dead son on any bomb to be dropped in Iraq; a 23-year-old New Yorker who enlists in the United States Army because he was poor and in debt, his decision impelled by his mother's death; and a military explosives scientist (Anh Duong) who arrived in the U.S. as a refugee child from Vietnam in 1975.

== Producer's list ==
The producer's list included "more than a dozen organizations, from the Canadian Broadcasting Corporation to the United Kingdom's BBC, Estonia's ETV and numerous European broadcasters" but no U.S. names. The Sundance Institute did, however, provide completion funding. Writer and director Jarecki said "serious examination of Eisenhower and the aftermath of his speech proved 'too radical' for potential American funders for his film" and except for Sundance, he "could not raise a dollar in the U.S."

== Contributors and representatives ==
=== Politicians ===
- Senator John McCain: elected to the United States Senate in 1986, he is a former U.S. Navy pilot and Vietnam prisoner of war.
- Richard Perle, chairman, Pentagon Defense Policy Board (2001–03): worked in the U.S. Government for three decades, and is an architect of the George W. Bush Administration's foreign policy. As a writer, he regularly is published in conservative news publications.
- William Kristol, editor, The Weekly Standard: a political theorist identified with the neoconservative movement, co-founder of the Project for the New American Century think tank in 1997.

=== Civilians ===
- Joseph Cirincione, senior associate and Director of the Non-Proliferation Project, Carnegie Endowment for International Peace, Washington, D.C.
- Gwynne Dyer: military historian, writer, and journalist who has worked for the Canadian, British, and American militaries. He published books, articles, information papers, and a radio series, about international affairs.
- Susan Eisenhower, granddaughter of President Eisenhower: senior fellow at the Eisenhower Institute's director of programs. She is serving a third appointment to the Committee on International Security and Arms Control (CISAC) of the National Academy of Sciences.
- John Eisenhower, son of President Eisenhower, Military Historian: A military historian member of White House staff during his father's administration. He is a retired Brigadier General (USA) and served as U.S. ambassador to Belgium, 1969 and 1971.
- Chalmers Johnson, Central Intelligence Agency 1967–73, Political Scientist: With a fifty-year career in foreign policy, he is President of the Japan Policy Research Institute. An academic at the University of California, he has written many articles and books.
- Charles Lewis, Center for Public Integrity: Founder, and ex-executive director, Center for Public Integrity—non-profit, non-partisan "watch-dog" organisation established in 1989—investigating and reporting their research about U.S. public policies.
- Wilton Sekzer, retired police sergeant, New York City Police Department, Vietnam veteran: Vietnam veteran, door gunner from the 13th Combat Aviation Battalion, whose son was killed on 9/11. After the attacks, he says the Bush Administration made him believe Saddam Hussein was responsible. He e-mailed every military branch, asking if his son's name might be written on a bomb to be dropped on Iraq. Later, he is uncertain if he should regret his actions, after hearing President Bush claim he does not know from where people got the idea that there was a link between Saddam Hussein and the 9/11 attacks.
- William Solomon: twenty-three-year-old soldier. Deployed to Iraq on January 10, 2005, for 18 months, as a helicopter mechanic. It appears Solomon made it to Sergeant in the 1st Battalion 52nd Aviation Regiment, Fort Wainwright, Alaska, according to a website that reports on different activities of soldiers. There is a photo of Solomon and a specialist talking to basketball coaches in Kuwait at Camp Virginia. The coaches are on their way to Iraq to participate in Operation Hardwood 5 which is a program that brings US basketball coaches to the American troops in the Middle East.
- Frank "Chuck" Spinney, retired military Analyst: Lehigh University-schooled mechanical engineer (class of 1967), worked in the USAF, in Ohio, before working in the Pentagon's Office of Program Analysis and Evaluation in 1977. He became a harsh critic of the Pentagon, later known as the "Conscience of the Pentagon", when he attacked the spiraling spending increase in the report "Defense facts of life", published in 1982, later known as the "Spinney Report", which earned a cover on Time magazine.
- Gore Vidal, author of Imperial America: writer, playwright, screenwriter, novelist, and essayist, he has written books on American foreign policy explaining the American empire.

=== Military participants ===
- 'Fuji' and 'Tooms': USAF stealth fighter pilots 'Fuji' and 'Tooms' dropped the first bombs on Baghdad city, starting the Iraq War in 2003.
- Colonel Richard Treadway, Commander USAF Stealth Fighter Squadron: Vice-Commander of the 49th Fighter Wing of the U.S. Air Force.
- Colonel Walter W. Saeger Jr., director, U.S. Air Force Munitions Directorate: Director of the Air-to-Surface Munitions Directorate, Ogden Air Logistics Center, Hill Air Force Base in Utah.
- Karen Kwiatkowski: a retired U.S. Air Force Lieutenant Colonel of the Pentagon working with the National Security Agency.
- James G. Roche, Secretary of the Air Force: Twentieth United States Secretary of the Air Force.
- Nguyet Anh Duong: inventor of the thermobaric bunker buster bomb, refugee from South Vietnam.

=== DVD commentators ===
- Colonel Lawrence Wilkerson, Chief of Staff to Secretary of State Colin Powell: From 1984 to 1987, Col. Wilkerson was Executive Assistant to Admiral Stewart A. Ring, USN, Director for Strategy and Policy (J5) USCINCPAC. In the 1990s Col. Wilkerson was Director of the USMC War College, Quantico, Virginia. He has written much about military and national security affairs in mainstream and professional journals.

== Reception ==
On the review aggregator website Rotten Tomatoes, 78% of 115 critics' reviews are positive. The website's consensus reads: "A provocative and timely film that explores the military/industrial complex and the motivating forces that lead us to war." Metacritic, which uses a weighted average, assigned the film a score of 68 out of 100, based on 32 critics, indicating "generally favorable" reviews.

== See also ==
- Military Keynesianism
- The Ground Truth, a 2006 documentary film about veterans of the Iraq War
- We Are Many, a 2014 documentary film about the February 2003 global day of protest against the Iraq War
- Protests against the Iraq War

Awards
Preceded by DiG!	Sundance Grand Jury Prize: U.S. Documentary; 2005	Succeeded by God Grew Tired of Us
Preceded by	Peabody Award; 2006	Succeeded by
