= Havana Marking =

British film producer and director

- Born: England
- Occupations: Director, Producer
- Years active: 2005–present

Havana Marking is a British producer and director of documentary films. Her first feature documentary, Afghan Star, won Best Director and the Audience Award at the 2009 Sundance Film Festival. Her latest feature film Undercover Exposing the Far Right has been nominated for the 2025 BAFTA, RTS award, Realscreen and Broadcast awards . It was released in Oct 2024 on Channel 4 in the UK to critical acclaim. The Guardian described it: “Nail-biting and terrifying… the bravest documentary of the year… Marking’s film isn’t just a good doc, it’s a great one.”. The Telegraph gave 5 stars and wrote: “Unsettling investigation that plays out like a spy thriller… thrilling to behold, chilling to contemplate.”

== Life ==
Marking was born in England and moved to the United States as a child. Her father, Giles Marking, is a designer in London and he was an Architecture professor at the University of Washington. Stacy Marking (13 November 1939; died 2 October 2023), her mother, was a journalist, writer and business woman and was one of the first female television directors in the UK. She now lives in London with her daughter.

Between 2008-2017 as co-director of Roast Beef Productions, Marking oversaw the development and production of a number of documentaries.

Marking has directed films for HBO (Silencing the Song), More4 (Vote Afghanistan!) and the BBC (Secret History of the Family). Her part-animated feature, Smash & Grab: the Story of the Pink Panthers, about Balkan diamond thieves Storyville, had a wide cinematic release in the US and was optioned by Danny Boyle (Currently on Amazon Prime). Her last feature, The Kleptocrats, aired on Starz and can be viewed in iTunes.

She also directed the documentary Undercover: Exposing the Far Right, which was nominated for a 2025 BAFTA Award for Best Television/Single Documentary.

Marking was Executive Producer on numerous films, notably Hell and Back Again (directed by Danfung Dennis), nominated for a 2012 Academy Award, and Pussy Riot: A Punk Prayer.

== Afghan Star ==
The film follows a season of the Afghan TV phenomenon, based on X-Factor / American Idol. Marking lived in Kabul for five months and focused on four main contestants in the series. The film changed pitch at the moment that Setara Hussainzada (a young woman from Herat) danced during her final performance. This led to death threats, condemnation and the possibility that the show itself might be stopped. The film won The Grierson award for ‘best doc on a contemporary issue’, and the Prix Italia.

== Filmography ==
Year	Film	Notes
2005	What Would Jesus Drive?	Producer
2005	The F Word	Producer
2005	The Great Relativity Show	
2007	The Crippendales	
2009	Afghan Star	Winner, Best Director and Audience Award at the 2009 Sundance Film Festival
2013	Pussy Riot: A Punk Prayer	
2014	Smash & Grab	Director
2016	Ashley Madison: Sex, Lies and Cyberattacks	
2016	The Secret History of My Family	
2018	The Kleptocrats	
2024	Undercover: Exposing the Far Right	Director; Nominated for 2025 BAFTA for Best Television/Single Documentary
