= We Are Many =

We Are Many may refer to:

- Legion (demons), a group of demons in the New Testament
- We Are Many (film), a 2014 British documentary film
- We Are Many, an arts and environmental festival in Saskatoon, Canada
