= Graham Reilly =

British composer

Graham Reilly is a British composer, known for composing television music in the UK, Europe and US.

Based in his HQ Studio, Reilly has scored the music to over 1000 hours of prime time TV and Film productions in the US, UK and Europe, for all the major networks including: BBC, ITV, Channel 4, Channel 5 National Geographic Channel, Discovery Channel, SKY UK, Paramount+, Apple TV+.

Reilly was mentored by the late Peter Waygood ex-head of Production, Air Edel Associates Ltd (London/USA). Senior Lecturer at The Royal Academy of Music (London), and Chairman of PCAM (Producers & Composers of Applied Music).

Reilly has composed music for the TV series Seconds From Disaster which has been shown in over 140 territories worldwide on the National Geographic network of channels.

Reel History of Britain presented by broadcaster Lord Melvyn Bragg - performed by the BBC Philharmonic and recorded at BBC Studios Manchester.

The Story of Britain - BBC animation series nominated for a BAFTA.

Heaven Made - BBC One - wins Royal Television Society (RTS) award for Best Daytime Programme.

Dragons' Den - BAFTA nominated TV series - BBC One/TWO.

Columbia’s Last Flight - Seconds From Disaster – National Geographic Channel - New York Festivals TV Awards Gold Winner.

Bali Bombing - Seconds From Disaster – National Geographic Channel - Emmy Nomination.

Mastermind - BBC TWO/SBS TV.

Chinese School - BBC series - nomination - Best of the Year Documentary and shortlisted Best Documentary series Broadcast Awards.

Home Is Where The Art Is - BBC One - Royal Television Society (RTS) nomination for Best BBC Daytime TV series.

Villages by the Sea - BBC One - Royal Television Society (RTS) nomination 2023/24 for Best Factual TV series.

A Lake District Farm Shop - Channel 4 - Royal Television Society (RTS) nomination for Best Factual Entertainment series.

A Lake District Farm Shop - Channel 4 - Royal Television Society (RTS) nomination for Best Regional Programme.

== Music Credits for TV ==
- Motorway Cops: Catching Britain's Speeders - series 7/8/9/10 - Channel 5 / VTM 4
- Villages by the Sea - series 5 - BBC One/TWO / Apple TV+
- Motorway Cops: Catching Britain's Speeders - series 6 - Channel 5 / VTM 4
- Britain's Most Beautiful Road-series 1- Channel 4 / Apple TV+
- Motorway Cops USA - series1-Paramount+/Apple TV+
- Motorway Cops: Catching Britain's Speeders - series 5 - Channel 5 / VTM 4
- Motorway Cops: Total Carnage - series 1 - Channel 5 / VTM 4
- Motorway Cops: Catching Britain's Speeders - series 4 - Channel 5 / VTM 4
- Villages by the Sea - series 4 - BBC One/TWO / Apple TV+
- Motorway Cops: Catching Britain's Speeders - series 3 - Channel 5 / VTM 4
- A Cotswold Farmshop - Channel 4 / Apple TV+
- A Lake District Farm Shop - series 2 - Channel 4 - RTS nomination for Best Factual Entertainment / Best Regional Programme.
- Villages by the Sea - series 3 - BBC One/TWO - RTS nomination for Best Factual series.
- A Lake District Farm Shop at Christmas - Channel 4
- Home Is Where the Art Is - series 2 - BBC One
- Home Is Where the Art Is - series 1 - BBC One - RTS nomination for Best BBC Daytime TV series.
- A Lake District Farm Shop - series 1 - Channel 4
- Villages By The Sea - series 2 - BBC One/TWO/Apple TV+
- Antiques Hunters on Tour - Channel 4
- Motorway Cops: Catching Britain's Speeders - series 2 - Channel 5 / VTM 4
- Mastermind/Celebrity Mastermind - BBC Two/SBS TV
- Christmas City - BBC One
- Dragons' Den - BBC One/TWO
- Motorway Cops: Catching Britain's Speeders - series 1 - Channel 5 / VTM 4
- Call the Council - series 3 - BBC One
- Seconds From Disaster - season 7 - National Geographic Channel
- Tomoko - Japanese Short - Finite Films and TV
- Technobabble - series 2 - CBBC
- Demolition: The Wrecking Crew - BBC Two
- Call the Council - series 2 - BBC One
- Technobabble - series 1 - CBBC
- The Story of Britain - BBC - BAFTA nomination.
- Call the Council - series 1 - BBC One
- Permission Impossible: Britain's Planners - BBC TWO
- Oilfield Iraq - LUK Oil - If Not Us Films
- Thelma's Gypsy Girls / Little Shop of Gypsies - Channel 4 / TLC
- The Planners - BBC Two
- Seconds From Disaster - season 6 - National Geographic Channel
- Children of 9/11: Revealed - Channel 5
- Seconds From Disaster - season 5 - National Geographic Channel - episode: Bali Bombing - Emmy Nomination.
- Reel History of Britain - BBC Two - performed by the BBC Philharmonic and recorded at BBC Studios Manchester.
- Ben Fogle Escape in Time - BBC Two
- Sea Patrol UK - Channel 5 / National Geographic Channel
- Sailing The Treasure Ship - National Geographic Channel
- Arab Treasure Ship (Ancient Megastructures) - National Geographic Channel
- The Trigger - Wellington Films
- Coastline Cops - ITV / ITV4
- Dangerous Adventures For Boys - Channel 5
- Alaska Oilmen - Gamble On The Ice - Discovery Channel
- Chinese School - BBC Two / BBC Four / BBC Worldwide - nomination for Best Documentary - Broadcast Awards.
- El Hoppo! - Dan Films - Festival Finalist Nominated for best short film at this year's Rushes Soho Shorts Film Festival 2008.
- Britain's Best - UKTV
- The Dearly Departed - Living Stone Film
- Big Ideas That Changed The World - Channel 5 -series 2
- Oil, Sweat & Rigs - Discovery Channel
- Seconds From Disaster - National Geographic Channel - episode: Columbia's Last Flight won Gold World Medal 2006 New York Festivals.
- Big Ideas That Changed The World - Channel 5 - series 1
- Scrapheap Challenge - The Scrappy Races - Channel 4 - series 3
- The Sofa - Working Title Films
- Leave No Trace - BBC One
- Scrapheap Challenge - The Scrappy Races - Channel 4 - series 2
- Pieter en de Vogels - Vroum Vroum
- Rebuilding Stonehenge - National Geographic Channel
- Test Case - Discovery Channel
- Stonehenge The Ultimate Experiment Live! - Channel 5
- Scrapheap Challenge - The Scrappy Races - Channel 4 - series 1
- The Real CSI - Channel 5
- Las Vegas CSU (Crime Scene Unit) - Court TV

== Production Music - used on TV Series ==
- Doorbell Detectives - series 1/2 - BBC One
- Jewel of the Med - series 1 - Channel 5 / Apple TV+
- Africa - BBC Earth
- Villages by the Sea - BBC One/BBC Two
- Heaven Made - BBC One/BBC Two - RTS nomination for Best Daytime Programme.
- Heaven Made at Christmas - BBC One/BBC Two
- Britain's Dangerous Drivers - Channel 5
- Traffic Cops - BBC One
- Pitches to Riches - BBC Two
- Harry Hills - TV Burp - BBC Four
- Motorway Cops - BBC One
- Best Ever Pitches - BBC Two
- Secrets of Althorp The Spencers Club - PBS
- The Wonderful World Of Crafting - Channel 5
- Rip Off Britain - BBC One
- Shop, Robbers and Videotape - Channel 5
- Oil Strike! / Wildcatters - Discovery Channel
- Dispatches - Channel 4
- The Harlot’s Progress - Channel 4
- 30 Minutes - Channel 4
- Madonna and Mercy - Channel 4
- Car Crime UK - ITV
- Sewer Men - ITV
- Car Wars - BBC One
- Make Me A Baby - BBC Three
- Watersports World - Sky Sports / Fox
- Race World - Sky Sports / Fox
- Sports Unlimited - Sky Sports / Fox
- Chef Academy - Bravo (US TV channel)
- Birth of Britain - Channel 4
- Wheelers Dealers - Discovery Channel
- Trains with Peter Waterman - Channel 4
- Mayday Mayday - ITV
- Is Our Weather Getting Worse? - Channel 4
- Disasters at Sea: Why Ships Sink - Channel 4
- Death Scene Investigations - Five/MSNBC
- Technobytes - CBBC
- Celebs On The Farm - 5 Star
- Celebrity Big Brother - Channel 5 & MTV
- Bargin Shop Wars - ITV
- Make You Laugh Out Loud - Channel 5
- Weather That Changed The World - Viasat History
- Motorsport 2017 - Sky Sports
- Criminally Funny Caught In The Act - Channel 5
- Short Story - BBC Radio 4
- BBC Children in Need
