= List of Starz original programming =

Starz is an American pay television network owned and operated by Starz Inc., a subsidiary of Starz Entertainment. Primarily a film-based service, it began to introduce original programming in 2005 to compete with rival pay TV services HBO and Showtime.

== Current programming ==
=== Drama ===
Title	Genre	Premiere	Seasons	Runtime	Status
P-Valley	Drama	July 12, 2020	2 seasons, 18 episodes	51–60 min	Final season due to premiere on December 4, 2026
Outlander: Blood of My Blood	Historical romantic fantasy	August 8, 2025	2 seasons, 20 episodes	59–80 min	Season 2 ongoing
S.W.A.T. Exiles	Action drama	September 25, 2026	1 season, 10 episodes	46–47 min	Season 1 ongoing Renewed

=== Unscripted ===
==== Docuseries ====
Title	Subject	Premiere	Seasons	Runtime	Status
The BMF Documentary: Blowing Money Fast	Culture	October 23, 2022	2 seasons, 14 episodes	28 min	Pending

=== Co-productions ===
These shows have been commissioned by Starz in cooperation with a partner from another country.

Title	Genre	Partner/Country	Premiere	Seasons	Runtime	Status
Sweetpea	Dark comedy drama	Sky Atlantic/United Kingdom	October 10, 2024	1 season, 6 episodes	43–52 min	Season 2 due to premiere in early 2027
The Couple Next Door	Psychological thriller	Channel 4/United Kingdom	January 17, 2025	2 seasons, 12 episodes	52–56 min	Pending
Fightland	Sports crime drama	Sky Atlantic/United Kingdom	July 31, 2026	1 season, 8 episodes	50–54 min	Pending

== Upcoming programming ==
=== Drama ===
Title	Genre	Premiere	Seasons	Runtime	Status
Power: Origins	Crime drama	TBA	1 season, 18 episodes	TBA	Post-production
Power: Legacy	Crime drama	TBA	1 season, 8 episodes	TBA	Series order
Untitled Kirk A. Moore series	Western	TBA	1 season, 8 episodes	TBA	Series order

=== Co-productions ===
Title	Genre	Partner/Country	Premiere	Seasons	Runtime	Status
Maya	Drama	Channel 4/United Kingdom	TBA	1 season, 6 episodes	TBA	Post-production
You Are Here	Romantic drama	BBC/United Kingdom	TBA	1 season, 8 episodes	TBA	Series order

=== In development ===
==== Drama ====
- All Fours
- Bone Parish
- The Book of José
- Los Feliz
- Untitled Ippei Mizuhara series
- The Wolf King

== Former programming ==
=== Drama ===
Title	First broadcast	Last broadcast	Seasons
Crash	2008	2009	2 seasons, 26 episodes
Spartacus	2010	2013	3 seasons, 39 episodes
Boss	2011	2012	2 seasons, 18 episodes
Magic City	2012	2013	2 seasons, 16 episodes
Black Sails	2014	2017	4 seasons, 38 episodes
Power	2014	2020	6 seasons, 63 episodes
Outlander	2014	2026	8 seasons, 101 episodes
The Girlfriend Experience	2016	2021	3 seasons, 37 episodes
American Gods	2017	2021	3 seasons, 26 episodes
Counterpart	2018	2019	2 seasons, 20 episodes
Sweetbitter	2018	2019	2 seasons, 14 episodes
Vida	2018	2020	3 seasons, 22 episodes
Hightown	2020	2024	3 seasons, 25 episodes
Power Book II: Ghost	2020	2024	4 seasons, 40 episodes
Power Book III: Raising Kanan	2021	2026	5 seasons, 48 episodes
Heels	2021	2023	2 seasons, 16 episodes
BMF	2021	2025	4 seasons, 38 episodes
Power Book IV: Force	2022	2026	3 seasons, 30 episodes
Becoming Elizabeth	2022	2022	1 season, 8 episodes
The Serpent Queen	2022	2024	2 seasons, 16 episodes
Dangerous Liaisons	2022	2022	1 season, 8 episodes
Spartacus: House of Ashur	2025	2026	1 season, 10 episodes

=== Comedy ===
Title	First broadcast	Last broadcast
Head Case	2007	2009
Hollywood Residential	2008	2008
Party Down	2009	2023
Gravity	2010	2010
Survivor's Remorse	2014	2017
Ash vs Evil Dead	2015	2018
Blunt Talk	2015	2016
Now Apocalypse	2019	2019
Run the World	2021	2023
Blindspotting	2021	2023
Shining Vale	2022	2023

=== Miniseries ===
Title	Year aired
Spartacus: Gods of the Arena	2011
Flesh and Bone	2015
The White Princess	2017
The Rook	2019
The Spanish Princess	2019–20
Gaslit	2022
Three Women	2024

=== Unscripted ===
==== Docuseries ====
Title	First broadcast	Last broadcast
America to Me	2018	2018
Warriors of Liberty City	2018	2018
Wrong Man	2018	2020
Leavenworth	2019	2019
Seduced: Inside the NXIVM Cult	2020	2020
Confronting a Serial Killer	2021	2021
Men in Kilts: A Roadtrip with Sam and Graham	2021	2023
Who Is Ghislaine Maxwell?	2022	2022
Down in the Valley	2024	2024
Magic City: An American Fantasy	2025	2025

==== Variety ====
Title	First broadcast	Last broadcast
Hollywood One on One	1995	2003
Starz Inside	2007	2008
Starz Studios	2008	2016
The Chair	2014	2014
After Spring	2017	2017
Fat Joe Talks	2024	2024

=== Co-productions ===
Title	Partner/Country	First broadcast	Last broadcast
The Bronx Bunny Show	E4/United Kingdom	2007	2007
The Pillars of the Earth	The Movie Network/Canada; Movie Central/Canada; Sat.1/Germany	2010	2010
Camelot	RTÉ/Ireland; CBC/Canada	2011	2011
Da Vinci's Demons	FOX/United Kingdom	2013	2015
The White Queen	BBC One/United Kingdom	2013	2013
The Missing	BBC One/United Kingdom	2014	2016
Howards End	BBC One/United Kingdom	2018	2018
Dublin Murders	BBC One/United Kingdom; RTÉ/Ireland	2019	2019
Mary & George	Sky Atlantic/United Kingdom	2024	2024

=== Continuations ===
Title	First broadcast	Last broadcast
Step Up (season 3)	2022	
Minx (season 2)	2023	

=== Lionsgate+ regional original programming ===
These shows are originals because Starz commissioned or acquired them and had their premiere on the Lionsgate+ (previously Starzplay) service, but they are not available worldwide.

Title	Genre	Premiere	Seasons	Runtime	Exclusive region(s)	Language
Express	Thriller	January 16, 2022	2 seasons, 16 episodes	60 min	Spain & Latin America (Note: Season 2 only aired in Latin America.)	Spanish
Señorita 89 (Note: Co-production with Pantaya.)	Drama	February 27, 2022	1 season, 8 episodes	40–45 min	Latin America	Spanish
All Those Things We Never Said (Note: Co-production with Canal+.)	Comedy drama	December 15, 2022	1 season, 10 episodes	30 min	Europe and Latin America	French
Nacho	Biopic dark comedy	March 3, 2023	1 season, 8 episodes	TBA	Latin America	Spanish

=== Films ===
Title	Year aired
The Dresser	2016
