= Mike Lerner (filmmaker) =

American film director & producer

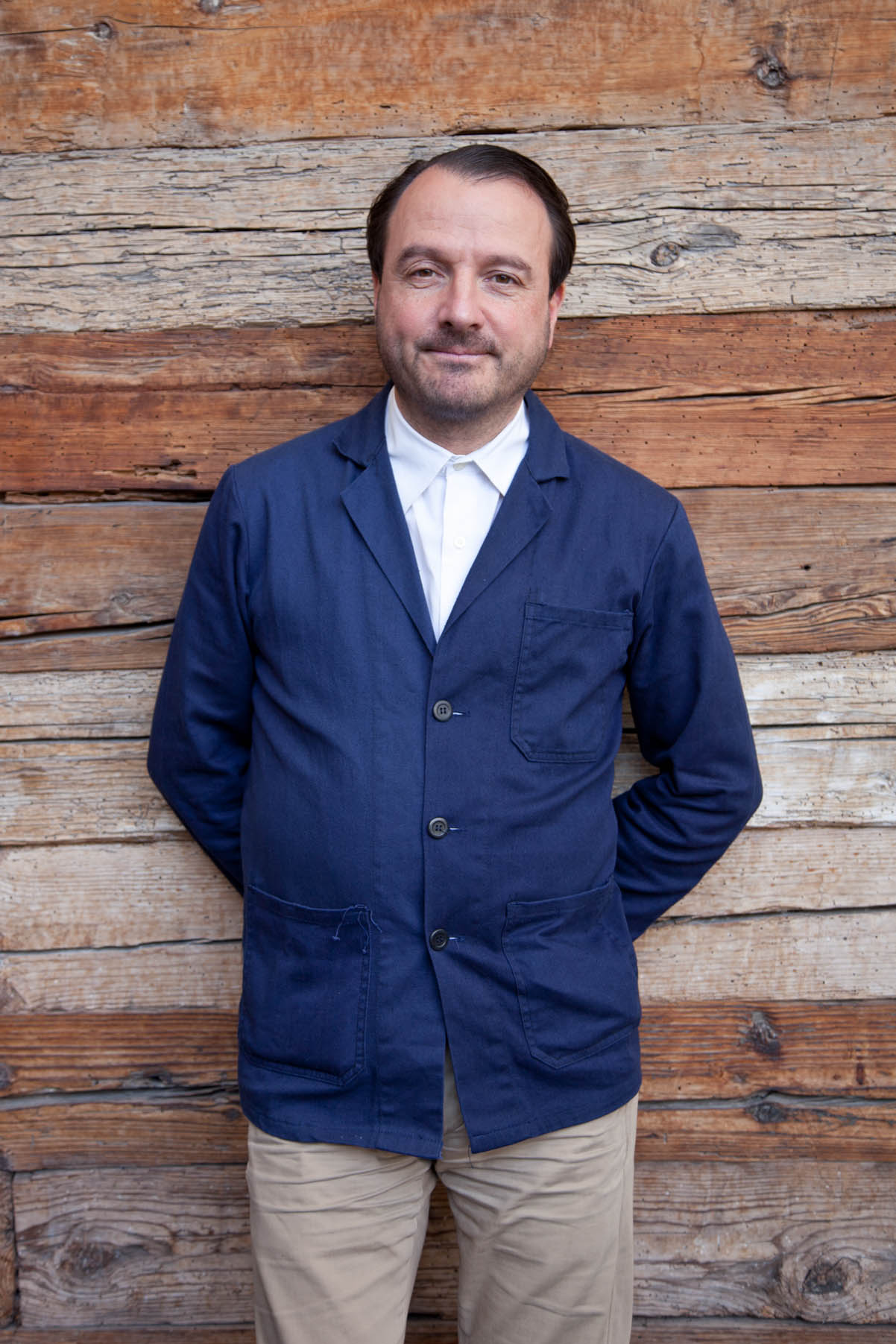
- Occupation: Documentary filmmaker

Mike Lerner is an American film director and producer. He has directed Pussy Riot: A Punk Prayer (2013), and Klarsfeld (2022). He has produced multiple documentary films and series including Hell and Back Again (2011), Rafea: Solar Mama (2012), The Square (2013), The Departure (2017), The Great Hack (2019), The Kleptocrats (2018), The Vow (2020–22), The Meaning of Hitler (2020), F*ck this Job (2021), Flight/Risk (2022), and Defiant (2023).

Lerner has been nominated for an Academy Award and two Primetime Emmy awards.

== Career ==
In 2007, Lerner alongside Martin Herring and Ian Wright launched Roast Beef Productions, a production company focusing on producing documentary films. In 2023, Roast Beef signed a first-look deal with All3Media International. In 2011, he produced Hell and Back Again directed by Danfung Dennis, revolving around the War in Afghanistan. The film and Lerner went onto be nominated for an Academy Award for Best Documentary Feature Film.

In 2012, Lerner executive produced Rafea: Solar Mama directed by Jehane Noujaim and Mona Eldaief, revolving around a woman who travels to be a solar engineer, one of many Solar Mamas. It had its world premiere at the 2012 Toronto International Film Festival in September 2012, and was broadcast on PBS in November 2012. In 2013, Lerner produced and directed Pussy Riot: A Punk Prayer alongside Maxim Pozdorovkin, revolving around the court cases surrounding Russian feminist protest group Pussy Riot, the film went onto be broadcast on HBO and BBC Storyville. That same year, Lerner executive produced The Square directed by Noujaim, which went onto be nominated for an Academy Award and Primetime Emmy Award for Outstanding Documentary or Nonfiction Special.

In 2015, Lerner produced The Russian Woodpecker directed by Chad Gracia, which followed Fedor Alexandrovich's investigation into the Chernobyl disaster, it went onto win the Sundance Grand Jury Prize and be nominated for an Independent Spirit Award for Best Documentary Feature. In 2017, Lerner executive produced The Departure directed by Lana Wilson.

In 2019, Lerner executive produced The Great Hack directed by Jehane Noujaim and Karim Amer, revolving around the Facebook–Cambridge Analytica data scandal, which went onto be nominated for a Primetime Emmy Award, and a BAFTA Award for Best Documentary. That same year, he executive produced Unmasking Jihadi John: Anatomy of a Terrorist for HBO Documentary Films and Channel 4.

In 2021, Lerner produced F*ck This Job directed by Vera Krichevskaya, revolving around a woman deciding to open an independent television station TV Rain, in Russia. In 2022, Lerner directed Klarsfeld alongside Martin Herring revolving around Beate Klarsfeld and Serge Klarsfeld, who confronted and hunted Nazi war criminals. That same year, Lerner produced Flight/Risk directed by Karim Amer revolving around Boeing 737 crashes. In 2023, Lerner produced Defiant also directed by Amer, following Disinformation in the Russian invasion of Ukraine.

Apart from films, Lerner has produced The Vow for HBO, Who Is Ghislaine Maxwell? for Starz and Channel 4, and Spacey Unmasked for Channel 4.

== Pledge ==
In September 2025, he signed an open pledge with Film Workers for Palestine pledging not to work with Israeli film institutions "that are implicated in genocide and apartheid against the Palestinian people."

== Filmography ==
- Machine of Human Dreams (documentary) (producer) 2016
- Pussy Riot: A Punk Prayer (documentary) (director) 2013
- A Whole Lott More (documentary) (producer) 2012
- The Negotiators (producer) 2012
- Hell and Back Again (documentary) (producer) 2011
- A Bipolar Expedition (TV documentary) (producer) 2010
- Afghan Star (documentary) (executive producer) 2009
- America the Wright Way (TV series) (executive producer) 2008
- Sickert vs Sargent (TV documentary) (producer) 2007
- Toulouse-Lautrec: The Full Story (TV documentary) (producer) 2006
- Kazakhstan Swings (TV documentary) (producer) 2006
- Vincent: The Full Story (TV series documentary) (producer) 2004
- Beijing Swings (TV documentary) (producer)2003
- Gauguin: The Full Story (TV documentary) (producer)2003
- Picasso: Magic, Sex & Death (TV mini-series documentary) (producer)2001
- Without Walls (TV series documentary) (producer; 2 episodes) 1995-1996
