= Smash & Grab =

2013 documentary

Smash & Grab: The Story of the Pink Panthers
- Directed by: Havana Marking
- Starring: Tomislav Tom Benzon; Daniel Vivian; Jasmin Topalusic
- Cinematography: Richard Gillespie; Joshua Z Weinstein (segment "New York City")
- Edited by: Joby Gee
- Music by: Simon Russell
- Production company: Roast Beef Productions
- Release date: July 31, 2013
- Running time: 89 minutes
- Countries: United Kingdom; United States; Serbia and Montenegro
- Language: English

Smash & Grab: The Story of the Pink Panthers is a 2013 documentary by Havana Marking based upon the international jewel thief network called the Pink Panthers. The film had a limited release on 31 July 2013 and had a wider release in the United Kingdom on September 27, 2013. It was pitched at the 2010 Sheffield Doc/Fest MeetMarket prior to completion.

== Synopsis ==
The film features CCTV footage from several of the jewel heists attributed to the Pink Panthers, who are credited with over 300 jewel thefts throughout the world. Interspersed throughout the documentary are interviews with various personas such as crime experts as well as anonymous interviews with persons claiming to be members of the Pink Panthers. Smash & Grab also features several segments that follow Mike (Tomislav Tom Benzon), Mr. Green (Daniel Vivian), and Lena (Jasmin Topalusic), fictionalized depictions of members of the Pink Panthers.

== Reception ==
Critical reception has been largely positive. As of October 2, 2013, review aggregator Rotten Tomatoes has the film listed as 83% "fresh" based upon 15 reviews. The Guardian gave the film four stars, commenting that it "asks some fascinating questions – and has fascinating footage to match".
