= Wee Willie Harris =

English rock and roll singer (1933–2023)

- Born: Charles William Harris; 25 March 1933; Bermondsey, London, England
- Died: 27 April 2023 (aged 90)
- Genres: Rock and roll, pop
- Occupation: Singer
- Instruments: Vocals, piano, guitar, double bass
- Years active: 1957–2023
- Labels: Decca, His Master's Voice, Polydor, Parlophone, and others

Charles William Harris (25 March 1933 – 27 April 2023), better known by his stage name of Wee Willie Harris, was an English rock and roll singer. He is best known for his energetic stage shows and TV performances starting in the 1950s, when he was known as "Britain's wild man of rock 'n' roll".

== Life and career ==
Born in Bermondsey, Harris left his job at a Peek Freans bakery in London to start his music career. He began performing at The 2i's Coffee Bar in Soho, London, where he was the resident piano player, performing with Tommy Steele, Adam Faith, Screaming Lord Sutch, and others. He was named for his 5′ 2″ height, and in tribute to Little Richard. In November 1957, he was picked by TV producer Jack Good to appear in the BBC show Six-Five Special. His appearances on the show led to concerns being expressed in the media about the BBC's role in "promoting teenage decadence". His debut single, the self-penned "Rockin' At the 2 I's", was released on the Decca label in December 1957, and was followed by several others, although none reached the UK Singles Chart.

He became a popular performer on TV shows and in live performances, and was known for his energy, multicoloured dyed hair (often green, orange, or pink), and clothes including "larger-than-life stage jackets that looked like the coat hanger was still inside, tight drainpipe trousers, and a huge polka-dot bow tie". Another critic wrote that: "He gyrates like an exploding Catherine wheel, emitting growls, squeals and what sounds like severe hiccupping". Paul McCartney and John Lennon reportedly queued for his autograph when he played in Liverpool in 1958. According to Harris, the idea for dyeing his hair pink originally came from his manager, professional wrestler and wrestling promoter Paul Lincoln, who was inspired by American wrestler Gorgeous George.

In May 1960, he joined a tour of the UK featuring Conway Twitty, Freddy Cannon, and Johnny Preston. He continued to record in the 1960s, for His Master's Voice, Polydor, and Parlophone, and continued to perform in the UK as well as in Israel and Spain and on cruise ships.

In the mid-1970s, he lived in Prestwich, near Manchester. He resurfaced in the late 1970s as a nostalgia act, after Ian Dury mentioned him in the song "Reasons to be Cheerful, Part 3". Harris later recorded an album dedicated to Dury, Twenty Reasons To Be Cheerful (2000), and his early recordings were released on CD in 1999. In 1991, he briefly featured in the music video for Hale & Pace's "The Stonk" contribution to Comic Relief and, in 2003, he released the album Rag Moppin', backed by the Alabama Slammers.

In 2005, Harris appeared as a "mystery guest" on the comedy music quiz programme Never Mind the Buzzcocks, and was easily identified. In 2011, he was interviewed by Melvyn Bragg as part of the series Reel History of Britain, talking about rock and roll in Britain.

Rollercoaster Records published I Go Ape! - The Wee Willie Harris Story by Rob Finnis, an 88-page illustrated biography accompanied by a 30-track CD, featuring the best of Harris's rock and roll recordings, in 2018.

Wee Willie Harris died on 27 April 2023, at age 90.

== Discography ==
=== Singles ===
- "Rockin' At The 2 I's" / "Back To School Again" (Decca, 1957)
- "Love Bug Crawl" / "Rosie Lee" (Decca, 1958)
- "Got A Match" / "No Chemise, Please!" (Decca, 1958)
- "Wild One" / "Little Bitty Girl" (Decca, 1960)
- "You Must Be Joking" / "Better To Have Loved" (His Master's Voice, 1963)
- "Listen to the River Roll Along" / "Try Moving Baby" (Polydor, 1966)
- "Someone's in the Kitchen With Diana" / "Walk With Peter And Paul" (Parlophone, 1966)
- "Together" / "Rock 'n' Roll Jamboree" (Decca, 1974)

=== EPs ===
- Rocking With Wee Willie (Decca, 1958)
- I Go Ape (Arton, 1960)

=== Albums ===
- I Go Ape (Arton, 1962)
- Wee Willie Harris Goes Ape (Ace 178, 1986)
- Twenty Reasons To Be Cheerful (Fury, 2000)
- Rag Moppin' (Pollytone, 2003)
- I Go Ape - Rockin' With Wee Willie Harris (Rollercoaster, 2018)
