= Spacey Unmasked =

- Genre: Documentary
- Directed by: Katherine Haywood
- Composer: Simon Russell
- Country of origin: United Kingdom
- Original language: English
- No. of episodes: 2

Production
- Executive producers: Mike Lerner; Dorothy Byrne
- Producers: Katherine Haywood; Patrick Strudwick
- Cinematography: Ben Steele
- Editor: Colin Mixon
- Running time: 106 minutes
- Production companies: Roast Beef Productions; All3Media International

Original release
- Network: Channel 4
- Release: May 6 – May 7, 2024

Spacey Unmasked is a 2024 television documentary presenting sexual misconduct allegations by 10 men against Kevin Spacey. The two-part series was directed and produced by Katherine Haywood and premiered on Channel 4 in the UK. In addition to providing information about the victims and their allegations, the docuseries also analyzes Spacey's state of mind and posits that the alleged sexual assaults committed by Spacey are motivated by his own self-loathing.

== Cast ==
- Chloe Melas

== Release ==
In the United States, the series was aired on Investigation Discovery and Max beginning on 13 May 2024.

== Reception ==
Several days before the documentary was broadcast, Spacey criticised the lack of detail in the allegations that were put to him and the time he was given to respond.
