= Defiant (2023 film) =

- Directed by: Karim Amer
- Produced by: Karim Amer; Mike Lerner; Odessa Rae; Oleksiy Makukhin; Leen Karadsheh; Janet Knipe
- Cinematography: Jake Swantko; Misha Lubarsky; Michael Downey; Bowie Alexander
- Edited by: Emiliano Battista; Austin Reedy; Zackary Obid
- Music by: Katya Mihailova
- Production companies: Tales Of Others; Roast Beef Productions; Channel 4
- Release date: September 9, 2023 (TIFF)
- Running time: 99 minutes
- Countries: United States; United Kingdom; Ukraine
- Languages: English; Russian; Ukrainian

Defiant is a 2023 internationally co-produced documentary film directed and produced by Karim Amer. It follows the Russian invasion of Ukraine, focusing on Dmytro Kuleba and others fighting disinformation in the Russian invasion of Ukraine.

It had its world premiere at the 2023 Toronto International Film Festival on September 9, 2023.

== Plot ==
The film follows the Russian invasion of Ukraine, focusing on Dmytro Kuleba and others fighting disinformation. Rustem Umierov, Mykhailo Fedorov, Iryna Vereshchuk also appear in the film, as they return to work, focus on restoring Ukraine's internet, and tour cities liberated from occupation, respectively.

== Production ==
Initially, Karim Amer was introduced to Rustem Umerov, who cut their meeting short, in order to meet with Pope Francis, to deliver a message from Volodymyr Zelenskyy.

Showing that Amer and his team of producers, Mike Lerner and Odessa Rae, were interested, they began filming. Instead of focusing on the front lines, Amer chose to focus on the individuals dealing with diplomacy and disinformation. Due to the ongoing conflict, the filmmakers thought the project would be a series, but due to the fading interest in political filmmaking from investors, this idea was scrapped. The film was picture locked prior to the firing of former defense minister Oleksii Reznikov.

== Release ==
It had its world premiere at the 2023 Toronto International Film Festival on September 9, 2023. It also screened at the Camden International Film Festival on September 15, 2023. and DOC NYC on November 15, 2023.
