= Afghan Star (film) =

- Theatrical release poster by Cuban designer Giselle Monzón, 2008
- Directed by: Havana Marking
- Produced by: Martin Herring; Mike Lerner; Havana Marking
- Starring: Habib Amiri; Setara Hussainzada; Rafi Naabzada; Hameed Sakhizada; Lema Sahar
- Cinematography: Phil Stebbing
- Edited by: Ash Jenkins
- Music by: Simon Russell
- Distributed by: Zeitgeist Films
- Release date: 16 January 2009
- Running time: 87 minutes
- Country: United Kingdom
- Languages: English; Pashto; Dari
- Box office: $101,543 (US)

Afghan Star is a 2009 British documentary film following four contestants in the Afghan music competition Afghan Star. Afghan Star was directed by Havana Marking and is distributed by Zeitgeist Films. The film was acclaimed by critics.

== Filming/Production ==
Director and co-producer Havana Marking received funding from the Channel 4 BritDoc Foundation (now known as Doc Society) on the basis of her idea for the film. After spending a month gathering footage for a taster tape and planning the project, the documentary was commissioned by British channel More4.

Marking spent four months in Afghanistan filming, following the development of the four focal characters competing in the show. Producers worked with Afghanistan-based television station Tolo TV. Filming primarily took place in Kabul, where the competition for Afghan Star is held and the show is produced, but also features the cities of Herat and Kandahar when documenting the stories of Setara and Lema, two of the competitors.

Much of the film's decision-making was quite reactive and adapted to the circumstances faced by the filmmakers. Marking notes the mounting tensions and unpredictability of her own situation in the filming process in an interview, stating that while she wasn't threatened directly, a "general protocol had to be followed." She remarked about the danger presented by accompanying a contestant to her hometown of Kandahar and, instead, opted to give the contestant a camera to film in Kandahar on her own. Marking also described the postponing of a shoot due to aggressive militia activity, incited by a governing official and former warlord. Additionally, interviews with the people seen in the documentary were difficult to plan in ahead of time, and they often depended on people agreeing to film on the spot, after some conversation.

== Synopsis ==
Afghan Star follows the story of Hameed Sakhizada, Setara Hussainzada, Rafi Naabzada, and Lema Sahar, four contestants appearing in the third season of the Afghan reality show Afghan Star. Daoud Sediqi, director and host, explains that the show inspires Afghans to enjoy music again after the Taliban's ban. The contestants become national celebrities with people campaigning for votes which are cast via SMS. The show is popular among ordinary Afghan people and fans vote for their favorite contestants even across ethnic lines.

Contestant Setara Hussainzada is the first of the four to be eliminated. During her farewell performance she dances with free body movements without her hijab, as opposed to the more constrained dancing considered socially appropriate. After Daoud Sediqi decides to air the footage, there is outrage in the conservative Muslim community and Setara receives death threats and is evicted from her apartment. She explains that she is open-minded and that she wants other Afghans to be as well. She then returns home to her family. The other female contestant Lema Sahar, a Pashtun, is eliminated in the last round leaving Naabzada and Sakhizada. While one-third of Afghanistan watches, Rafi Naabzada wins the final round, becoming the Afghan Star.

Afghan Star uses each contestant as a lens through which to view various aspects of Afghan society. Setara's elimination and the reasons behind it are focused on at the film's midpoint. Her dancing was viewed as sacrilegious by many Afghan people, and this likely led to her early elimination. When she was eliminated, she was allowed to perform a final song to be broadcast across Afghanistan. She chose to dance more openly and passionately than in any previous performance, sending a message to the many viewers who opposed it. Ismail Khan, a prominent member of government and warlord who gained prominence in the Soviet-Afghan War denounced her dancing. One of the strongest undertones in the film is the rampant sexism in Islamic Afghanistan, as seen by the only two female finalists being eliminated before the last round. Lema Sahar chose to perform conservatively in a bid to gain favor from the Afghan population. She was ultimately voted off right before the last round, leaving Rafi Naabzada and Hameed Sakhizada to compete in the finale. Rafi hails from northern Afghanistan, and is competing to give his countrymen a distraction from the constant war in the region. The film did not spend much time on Rafi, focusing more on the female finalists. Hameed is an ethnic Hazara, hailing from central Afghanistan. His performance in the finale is a cry for ethnic unity among Afghans, a point the film drives. Ultimately, Rafi is the winner.

== Awards and nominations ==
=== Won ===
- 2009 Sundance Film Festival
  - World Cinema Directing Award: Documentary
  - World Cinema Audience Award: Documentary
- 2009 Prix Italia for Cultural/ General Interest

=== Submissions ===
- 82nd Academy Awards
  - Best Foreign Language Film-United Kingdom

== Reception ==
The film was acclaimed by critics. On Rotten Tomatoes the film has an approval rating of 100% based on 62 reviews, with an average rating of 7.67/10. It is the site's best rated film of 2009.

It was also labeled a NYT's Critic's Pick after Stephen Holden recommended it in his review for The New York Times. Holden praised the film for the way in which it explores modern Afghan culture through the "prism" of its four protagonists and their own personal struggles.

== See also ==
- List of films with a 100% rating on Rotten Tomatoes, a film review aggregator website
