= Pussy Riot: A Punk Prayer =

- Directed by: Mike Lerner; Maxim Pozdorovkin
- Produced by: Mike Lerner; Maxim Pozdorovkin; Havana Marking
- Starring: Nadezhda Tolokonnikova; Maria Alyokhina; Yekaterina Samutsevich
- Cinematography: Antony Butts
- Edited by: Simon Barker; Esteban Uyarra
- Music by: Simon Russell
- Production company: Roast Beef Productions
- Distributed by: Goldcrest Films International
- Release dates: 18 January 2013 (Sundance); 10 June 2013
- Running time: 88 minutes
- Countries: Russia; United Kingdom
- Language: Russian

Pussy Riot: A Punk Prayer (Russian: Показательный процесс: История Pussy Riot, romanized: Pokazatel'nyy protsess: Istoriya Pussy Riot, lit. 'Show Trial: The Pussy Riot Story') is a 2013 documentary film by Mike Lerner and Maxim Pozdorovkin. The film follows the court cases on the Russian feminist/anti-Putinist punk-rock protest group Pussy Riot. Directed by Lerner and Pozdorovkin, the film featured publicly available footage of the court proceedings and interviews with the families of the band members, but no interviews with the band members themselves.

The HBO network subsequently bought the U.S. television rights to the film The film aired on HBO on 10 June 2013.

The BBC showed the film on 21 October 2013 in its Storyville series of documentaries. Reviews have generally been generally positive.

== Overview ==
On 21 February 2012, five members of the group staged a performance on the soleas of Moscow's Cathedral of Christ the Savior. Their actions were stopped by church security officials. By evening, they had turned it into a music video entitled "Punk Prayer – Mother of God, Chase Putin Away!". The women said their protest was directed at the Orthodox Church leader's support for Putin during his election campaign.

On 3 March, two of the group members, Nadezhda Tolokonnikova and Maria Alyokhina, were arrested and charged with hooliganism. A third member, Yekaterina Samutsevich, was arrested on 16 March. Denied bail, they were held in custody until their trial began in late July. On 17 August, the three members were convicted of hooliganism motivated by religious hatred, and each was sentenced to two years imprisonment. Two other members of the group, who escaped arrest after February's protest, reportedly left Russia fearing prosecution. On 10 October, following an appeal, Samutsevich was freed on probation, her sentence suspended. The sentences of the other two women were upheld. In late October, Alyokhina and Tolokonnikova were separated and sent to prison.

The trial and sentence attracted considerable criticism, particularly in the West. The case was adopted by human rights groups including Amnesty International, which designated the women prisoners of conscience, and by a wide range of musicians including Madonna, Sting, and Yoko Ono. Public opinion in Russia was generally less sympathetic towards the women. Putin stated that the band had "undermined the moral foundations" of the nation and "got what they asked for".

Prime Minister Dmitry Medvedev said he did not think the three members of Pussy Riot should have been sent to jail, but stressed that the release of the remaining two imprisoned members was a matter for the courts.

== Interviewees ==
- Nadezhda Tolokonnikova
- Maria Alyokhina
- Yekaterina Samutsevich
- Mark Feygin
- Nikolai Polozov
- Stanislav Samutsevich
- Andrey Tolokonnikov
- Peter Verzilov
- Violetta Volkova
- Natalia Alyokhina

Archive footage

- Dmitry Medvedev
- Vladimir Putin
- Madonna
- Yoko Ono
- Dmitry Medvedev

== Release ==
In January 2013, the film was released by British documentary filmmaking company Roast Beef Productions. The working title was Show Trial: The Story of Pussy Riot; but was subsequently released as Pussy Riot: A Punk Prayer. It debuted at the 2013 Sundance film festival, after which Pussy Riot's Yekaterina Samutsevich fielded questions from the audience via Skype. Among other things she reiterated that she had no intention of turning Pussy Riot into a commercial venture. The film won a World Cinema Documentary Special Jury Award for "Punk Spirit" at the festival.

In December 2013, the first screening in Russia was blocked by Department of Culture.

The film was one of 15 feature-length documentaries short listed for a 2014 Academy Award, but it was not included in the final list of nominees.

== Critical response ==
The film received generally reviews from critics. On Metacritic it has a score of 72% based on reviews from 8 critics, indicating "generally favorable reviews". On Rotten Tomatoes it has an approval rating of 83% based on reviews from 34 critics, with an average rating of 6.9 out of 10. Peter Bradshaw of The Guardian gave it 4 out of 5 stars and Amy Taubin of Film Comment called the film "A rousing portrait of courage and resilience."

The film was one of 15 feature-length documentaries short listed for a 2014 Academy Award. It was not included in the final list of nominees.

== See also ==
- Pussy versus Putin, another 2013 Russian documentary about the group
