= Steven Clemons =

American journalist and blogger (born 1962)

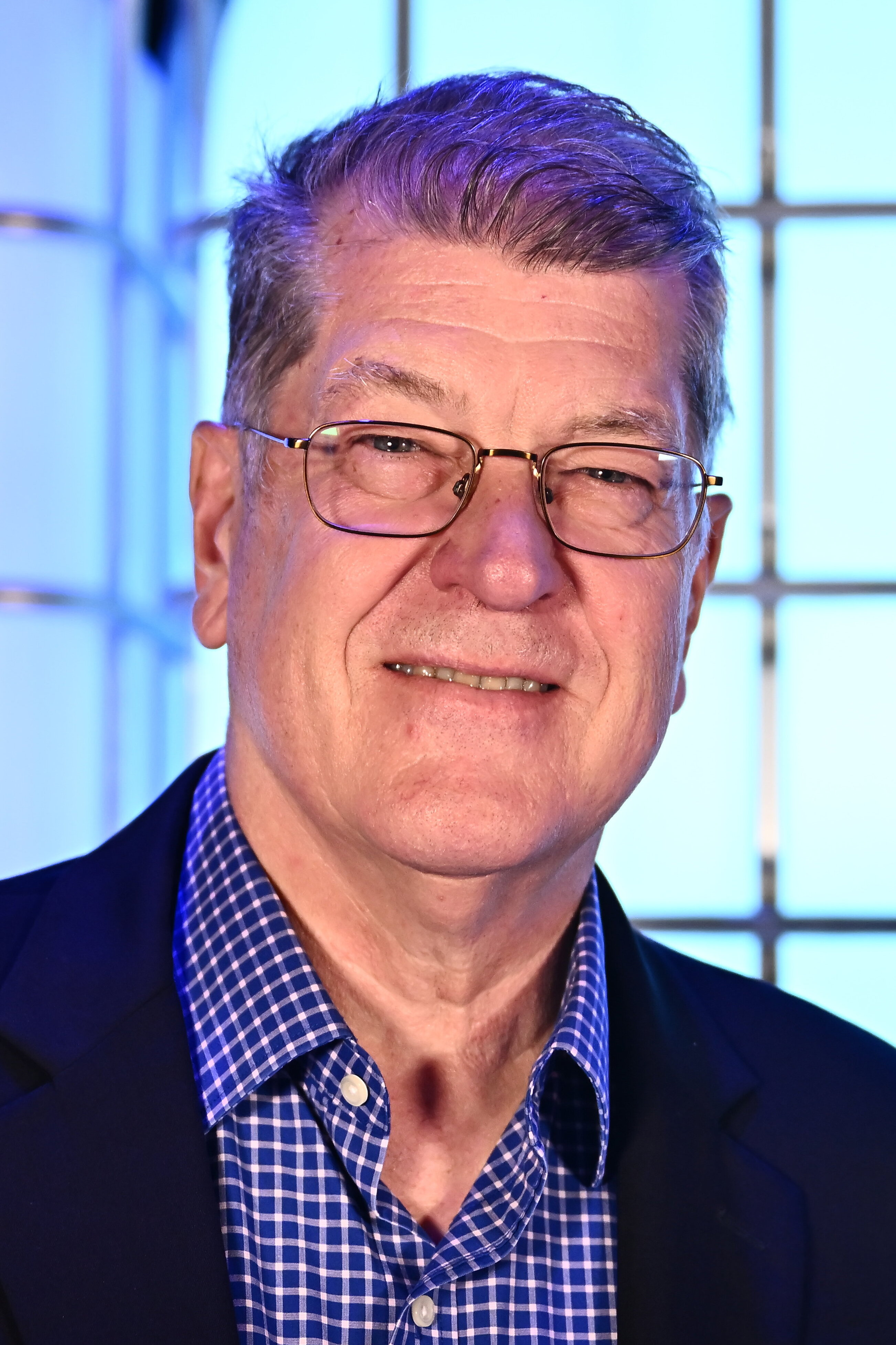
- Clemons in 2024
- Born: Steven Craig Clemons; 1962 (age 63–64); Salina, Kansas, U.S.
- Occupations: journalist and blogger
- Known for: Founding Editor at Large
- Notable work: political blog, The Washington Note
- Awards: Chevalier of the French Legion of Honour

Steven Craig Clemons (born 1962) is an American journalist and blogger. In March 2022, he became Founding Editor at Large of Semafor, Justin Smith and Ben Smith’s new media startup, to create their global events vertical. He spent three years as Editor at Large of The Hill. Before that, Clemons was Washington editor-at-large of The Atlantic and editor-in-chief of AtlanticLIVE, the magazine's live events series. Clemons also served as editor-at-large of Quartz, a digital financial publication owned by Atlantic Media. He is also the host of The Bottom Line that airs on the global network of Al Jazeera English.

Clemons also published a political blog, The Washington Note, through April 2015 and was previously CEO of the multi-arts platform The BeBop Channel. He is a former staff member of Senator Jeff Bingaman. Clemons is also served as Director of the American Strategy Program at the New America Foundation where he previously served as Executive Vice President, and the former director of the Japan Policy Research Institute which he co-founded with Chalmers Johnson. The New America Foundation has been described as radical centrist in orientation, and Clemons characterizes himself as a "progressive realist".

== Background ==
Clemons is the former executive vice president of Economic Strategy Institute, former executive director of the Nixon Center for Peace and Freedom (now the Center for the National Interest), and served as Senator Jeff Bingaman's Senior Policy Advisor on Economic and International Affairs. He has also served on the advisory board to the Center for U.S.-Japan Relations at the RAND Corporation. Earlier in his career, Clemons was the executive director of the Japan America Society of Southern California from 1987 to 1994.

In 1993, Clemons was the technical advisor for the film Rising Sun, which starred Sean Connery and Wesley Snipes. Clemons also had a role as a talk show host. He also had a role in the film State of Play, starring Ben Affleck.

Clemons serves on the board of advisors of the C. V. Starr Center for the Study of the American Experience at Washington College in Chestertown, Maryland, and the Clarke Center at Dickinson College in Carlisle, Pennsylvania.

== Blogging and Media ==
Clemons is perhaps best known for his blog The Washington Note, which focused on foreign policy issues and general US policy debates. In 2010, Time selected Clemons' blog as one of their "Best blogs of the year."

His articles have also appeared in other blogs, such as HuffPost and Daily Kos, and in major publications around the country.

Clemons serves at the host of The Bottom Line on the Al-Jazeera English news services.

== Honors ==
Clemons is a Chevalier of the French Legion of Honour.
