= Undercover: Exposing the Far Right =

2024 documentary film

Undercover: Exposing the Far Right is a documentary film directed by Havana Marking and aired on Channel 4. It reports on Hope not Hate journalists Patrik Hermansson and Harry Shukman's secret investigations into far-right groups in the United Kingdom.

The documentary includes images from hidden cameras that Hermasson and Shukman used to film far-right gatherings. Among the far-right activists filmed by them are politician Nick Scanlon, who is recorded using racial slurs related to Black people, and eugenicist Emil Kirkegaard. Human Diversity Foundation founder Matt Archer was also filmed.

Amid the far-right riots in Southport, the movie was pulled from the London Film Festival in October 2024 due to staff safety reasons.

The documentary was nominated for the Royal Television Society Programme Awards and the British Academy Television Award for Best Single Documentary.
