= Aidan Delgado =

United States Army soldier and conscientious objector

Aidan Delgado is an American attorney, author, and war veteran. His 2007 book The Sutras of Abu Ghraib detailed his experiences during his deployment in Iraq. He graduated from Georgetown Law in 2011.

== Early life ==
He is an American citizen and grew up in Thailand, Senegal and Egypt. His father served in the American diplomatic service. During his eight-year stay in Egypt, Delgado learned to speak Arabic. His family then moved to Florida, where he attended college.

== Army career ==
At 19 years of age, Delgado joined the Army Reserves on September 11, 2001. After signing his enlistment contract, he learned of the 9-11 terrorist attacks on the United States.

He was deployed to Iraq in April 2003. Because of his development of Buddhist beliefs, he filed for conscientious objector status. He continued to serve in Iraq while his request was processed. In November 2003, his unit was redeployed to Abu Ghraib prison.

In April 2004, the Army recognized his conscientious objector status and he was honorably discharged.

== After the Army ==
He returned to Sarasota, Florida and enrolled in the New College of Florida to continue his religion studies. He graduated in 2006.

In 2005, Delgado began giving public presentations about his experiences in Iraq. The Associated Press described it as a "grisly roadshow" that gives "a disturbing account of routine brutality that he [Delgado] claims he saw during his year in Iraq." His presentations resulted in military investigations from the 81st Regional Readiness Command and the United States Army Criminal Investigation Command.

In 2007, Beacon Press published a memoir of Delgado's time at Abu Ghraib and his conscientious objection entitled The Sutras of Abu Ghraib.

In 2011, Delgado received his Juris Doctor from Georgetown University Law Center. He was an associate with the international law firm Brown Rudnick.

== In the media ==
- He appears in the film The Ground Truth by Focus Features and the revised edition of Rush to War.
- In February 2006, blues guitarist Robert Cray released a video for his song "Twenty," about the Iraq War, in which Delgado portrayed a soldier coming home.
- Delgado is one of the individuals featured in the documentary Soldiers of Conscience by Luna Productions, broadcast on PBS on October 16, 2008.

== See also ==
- List of Iraq War Resisters
