= The Planners Are Coming =

- Genre: Documentary
- Narrated by: Timothy Spall
- Theme music composer: Simon Russell
- Country of origin: United Kingdom
- Original language: English
- No. of series: 1
- No. of episodes: 8

Production
- Production locations: London and Essex, United Kingdom
- Running time: 30 minutes
- Production company: IWC Media

Original release
- Network: BBC One
- Release: 11 September 2008 – 14 April 2009

Related
- Permission Impossible: Britain's Planners (2014); The Planners (2013)

The Planners Are Coming is a British fly on the wall documentary television series broadcast on BBC One in 2008 and 2009. It follows council Planning Officers and Enforcement Officers as they dealt with planning applications and enforced planning regulations in cases where planning permission had not been sought.

Council planning departments featured in the programme include those of Braintree in Essex and Barking & Dagenham, Barnet and Brent in London.

In 2008, the first four episodes were shown in an 8pm slot, with the remaining four episodes airing in 2009 at the later time of 10:35pm. The series has also been broadcast on The LifeStyle Channel in Australia.

When the programme was first announced by the BBC in June 2007, the working title was The Planners, but this was later changed to The Planners Are Coming. In 2013, a similar documentary series called The Planners aired on BBC Two and in 2014 a new series called Permission Impossible: Britain's Planners began on BBC Two.

== Episodes ==
#	Title	Original air date
1	"Subject To Approval"	11 September 2008
2	"Garden Designs"	25 September 2008
3	"Planning Police"	4 October 2008
4	"Direct Action"	23 October 2008
	Break in schedule	
5	"Not in My Backyard"	24 March 2009
6	"How Not to Build"	31 March 2009
7	"Permission Impossible"	7 April 2009
8	"Extension Nightmares"	14 April 2009

== See also ==
- Permission Impossible: Britain's Planners
- The Planners
