= The Ground Truth =

- Theatrical release poster
- Directed by: Patricia Foulkrod
- Written by: Patricia Foulkrod
- Produced by: Plum Pictures; Patricia Foulkrod
- Starring: Robert Acosta; Kelly Dougherty; Patricia Foulkrod; Nickie Huze; Sean Huze; Dom Mullins
- Cinematography: Reuben Aaronson; Christopher Bottoms
- Edited by: Rob Hall
- Music by: Dave Hodge
- Distributed by: Focus Features
- Release date: 2006
- Running time: 72 minutes
- Country: United States
- Language: English

The Ground Truth (also known as The Ground Truth: After the Killing Ends) is a 2006 documentary film about veterans of the Iraq War. It was directed and produced by Patricia Foulkrod.

== Plot ==
The film addresses the issues many soldiers face upon their return from the War in Iraq, including problems with posttraumatic stress disorder and an inability to meld back into "normal" society. The film includes footage of soldiers in Iraq and personal interviews with about two dozen people directly affected by the war (either veterans or family members/friends of veterans). The veterans, both men and women, speak of their experiences before, during, and after the war. The veterans speak about recruitment and training, combat, their returns home, facing their families, and their difficulties in making the necessary changes needed to fit back into society. The Ground Truth was released in theatres on September 15 of 2006 and released on DVD on September 26 of the same year. People can sign up to host screenings of the film online at The Ground Truth or view a low-resolution copy online, see bottom. l

== About the soldiers and veterans ==
The soldiers give their accounts of being in the U.S. military and stationed in Iraq. They focus on their experiences before, there, and the dealings afterwards. Before stationed, they joined the military forces and went through basic training. In basic training they mention such concepts as desensitization and depersonalization. The accounts given for the experiences in Iraq consist of the injuries to their physical bodies and to their own mentality. After they were discharged, they have to face and adapt back to the world they lived in before being stationed. Many mention the idea of post traumatic stress disorder, while also the adaptations made to their injuries; such as an amputated limb.

=== The accounts ===
Robert Acosta is a specialist in the U.S. Army and felt his time in the army saved him from facing time in prison. He lost his right hand and part of his right foot in Iraq in a grenade explosion.

Charles Anderson served in the U.S. Navy from 1996-2005, serving time in Iraq in 2003. When discharged he was diagnosed with posttraumatic stress disorder. Upon his return from the war, Anderson became actively involved in the anti-war effort and publicly supported increased government-provided care for veterans returning from Iraq.

Aidan Delgado was a specialist in the U.S. Army Reserve. Delgado served in Iraq in 2003 and was discharged in 2005. After finishing his service in Iraq, he became active in an anti-war program where he spoke publicly about what he felt to be the truth about Iraq. He also became a member of Iraq Veterans Against the War and the Buddhist Peace Fellowship.

Kelly Doughtery served as a medic and military policewoman in the U.S. Army National Guard. Kelly spent a year in Iraq from 2003-2004. After returning home, she became the co-founder and Southwest Coordinator for Iraq Veterans Against the War. She also gave worldwide speeches expressing her views on the war.

Jim Driscoll helped found Vets4Vets, an organization which provides peer support for veterans.

Sean Huze served as a corporal in the U.S. Marine Corps. He served in Iraq in 2003. Upon his discharge, he was awarded a Navy and Marine Corps Achievement Medal, Certificate of Commendation, the Combat Action Ribbon, the Presidential Unit Citation, the Global War on Terrorism Expeditionary Medal, Global War on Terrorism Service Medal, Good Conduct Medal, the National Defense Service Medal, and the Sea Service Deployment Ribbon. After his return he became involved in theatre and used dramatic art and expression to address the issue of posttraumatic stress disorder. He founded and is currently the artistic director for The VetStage Foundation, a non-profit theatre company for veterans.

Denver Jones was a U.S. Army sergeant. After serving in Desert Storm, he re-enlisted initially in the Army Reserve/NG (with the rank of PFC) to serve in Iraq after the attacks on 9/11. Denver lost his previous rank, due to prior service rules at the time. During his service he was involved in a PLS accident, which shattered his lower spine and caused a head injury, severe enough to bust two molars and cause brain damage. These injuries resulted in loss of use of his bladder and bowels, as well as the use of his Legs. The accident left him completely disabled. Jones suffered from posttraumatic stress disorder after his return from Iraq. Jones also has other disabilities as well and was divorced due to his injuries.

Joyce and Kevin Lucey became involved in the anti-war effort after their son (Jeffery Lucey – a 23-year-old veteran of the Iraq war) committed suicide. Jefferey had spent five months in Iraq in 2003, and fought in the Battle of Nasiriyah. He suffered from posttraumatic stress disorder after the war.

Camilo Mejía is a sergeant in the U.S. Army National Guard and fought in Iraq for a period of six months. After his return to America, he began to speak publicly about his experiences and disagreement with the War in Iraq.

Demond Mullins enlisted in the U.S. Army National Guard and served five years. He was deployed to Iraq for one year in 2004. After his return he joined Iraq Veterans Against the War.

Perry O'Brien was discharged as a conscientious objector (CO) after spending eight months in Afghanistan with the 82nd Airborne. He later founded Peace-Out, a website offering assistance to soldiers wishing to obtain CO status. He also became a member of Iraq Veterans Against the War and Veterans for Peace.

Paul Rieckhoff served as a platoon leader in Iraq. After returning home, he joined the anti-war effort by trying to spread word of what he felt are the true conditions soldiers in Iraq face. He is the creator of the Iraq and Afghanistan Veterans of America.

Stephen L. Robinson is a former Airborne Ranger and instructor at Ranger School. From September 2001 to January 2006, he served as Executive Director of the National Gulf War Resource Center. Robinson has been recognized as an expert on chemical and biological weapons and on Gulf War Illness. He served in the Gulf War, and also on the Veterans Affairs Research Advisory Committee on Gulf War Illnesses, and also as a Special Advisor for Vietnam Veterans of America. Robinson also became involved as the Government Relations Director for Veterans of America.

== Awards and critical acclaim ==
At the 2006 Sundance and Nantucket Film Festivals, critics hailed The Ground Truth as "powerful" and "quietly unflinching." The film has caused a great deal of critical controversy, mostly over its dealings with the sensitive subject of the Iraq War. The film has also been mentioned/critiqued in notable sources such as Newsweek, Time Magazine, The New Yorker, USA Today, and the New York Times. The film was one of 15 on the Oscar "short list" for the 2007 Academy Awards.

== Associated organizations ==
10% of proceeds from the sale of The Ground Truth DVDs go to Operation Helmet. Other associated organizations include Iraq Veterans Against the War, AMVETS, Appeal for Redress, Iraq and Afghanistan Veterans of America, the National Center for PTSD, the National Veterans Foundation, Purple Hearts Project, Soldiers Project, US Vets, Veterans for America, Veterans of Foreign Wars, Wounded Warrior Project, Vets 4 Vets, and several faith-based and student organizations.

== Credits ==
- Director: Patricia Foulkrod;
- Producor: Patricia Foulkrod;
- Executive Producers: Jodie Evans, Carl Linderum, Victor Scherb, Louise J. Wannier, Andrew Mysko, *Jon Faiz Kayyem, Dal LaMagna
- Cinematographer: Reuben Aaronson;
- Editor: Rob Hall;
- Released by: Focus Films;
- Running time: 88 minutes;
- Rating: R
- Original Music by David Hodge. The Ground Truth was filmed in Hollywood, Los Angeles, California; *Iraq; and Venice L.A., California.
- DVD release information:
- ASIN B000HA4WSY

== See also ==
- We Are Many, a 2014 documentary film about the February 2003 global day of protest against the Iraq War (by Amir Amirani).
- Why We Fight, a 2005 documentary film about the military–industrial complex, and its rise particularly prior to the 2003 Invasion of Iraq.
- Protests against the Iraq War
