= Chalmers Johnson =

American political scientist (1931–2010)

- Born: August 6, 1931; Phoenix, Arizona, U.S.
- Died: November 20, 2010 (aged 79); Cardiff-by-the-Sea, California, U.S.
- Education: University of California, Berkeley (BA, MA, PhD)
- Known for: Developmental state
- Awards: Before Columbus Foundation (2001)
- Scientific career
- Fields: Economics; Political science; East Asian studies
- Workplaces: University of California, Berkeley; Japan Policy Research Institute; University of San Francisco; University of California, San Diego
- Doctoral students: Cynthia Enloe
- Website: www.americanempireproject.com/johnson/index.asp

Chalmers Ashby Johnson (August 6, 1931 – November 20, 2010) was an American political scientist specializing in comparative politics, and professor emeritus of the University of California, San Diego. He served in the Korean War, was a consultant for the CIA from 1967 to 1973 and chaired the Center for Chinese Studies at the University of California, Berkeley from 1967 to 1972. He was also president and co-founder with Steven Clemons of the Japan Policy Research Institute (now based at the University of San Francisco), an organization that promotes public education about Japan and Asia.

Johnson wrote numerous books, including three examinations of the consequences of American imperialism: Blowback (2000), The Sorrows of Empire (2004), and Nemesis: The Last Days of the American Republic (2006).

== Life and career ==
Johnson was born in 1931 in Phoenix, Arizona, to David Frederick Johnson Jr. and Katherine Marjorie (Ashby) Johnson. He earned a BA in economics in 1953 and an MA and a PhD in political science in 1957 and 1961, respectively. Both of his advanced degrees were from the University of California, Berkeley. Johnson met his wife, Sheila, a junior at Berkeley, in 1956, and they married in Reno, Nevada, in May 1957.

During the Korean War, Johnson served as a naval officer in Japan. He was a communications officer on the USS La Moure County, which ferried Chinese prisoners of war from South Korea back to ports in North Korea. He taught political science at the University of California from 1962 until he retired from teaching in 1992. He was best known early in his career for his scholarship on the subjects of China and Japan.

Johnson set the agenda for 10 or 15 years in social science scholarship on China, with his book on peasant nationalism. His book MITI and the Japanese Miracle, on the Japanese Ministry of International Trade and Industry, was the pre-eminent study of the country's development and it created the subfield of what could be called the political economy of development. He coined the term "developmental state." As a public intellectual, he first led the "Japan revisionists" who critiqued American neoliberal economics with Japan as a model, and their arguments faded from view as the Japanese economy stagnated in the mid-1990s and later. During that period, Johnson served as a consultant to the Office of National Estimates, part of the CIA, and contributed to analysis of China and Maoism.

Johnson was elected a Fellow of the American Academy of Arts and Sciences in 1976. He served as Director of the Center for Chinese Studies (1967–1972) and Chair of the Political Science Department at Berkeley, and he held a number of important academic posts in area studies. He was a strong believer in the importance of language and historical training for conducting serious research. Late in his career, he became well known as a critic of rational choice approaches, particularly in the study of Japanese politics and political economy.

Johnson is probably best known as a sharp critic of what he called “American imperialism.” His book Blowback (2000) won a prize in 2001 from the Before Columbus Foundation, and it was reissued in an updated version in 2004. Sorrows of Empire, published in 2004, updated the evidence and argument from Blowback for the post-9/11 environment, and Nemesis concludes the trilogy. Johnson was featured as an expert talking head in the Eugene Jarecki-directed film Why We Fight, which won the 2005 Grand Jury Prize at the Sundance Film Festival.

Johnson wrote for the Los Angeles Times, the London Review of Books, Harper's, and The Nation.

== Blowback series ==
Johnson believed that the enforcement of American hegemony over the world constitutes a new form of global empire. Whereas traditional empires maintained control over subject peoples via colonies, the US, since World War II, has developed a vast system of hundreds of military bases around the world. A longtime Cold Warrior, he applauded the dissolution of the Soviet Union: "I was a cold warrior. There's no doubt about that. I believed the Soviet Union was a genuine menace. I still think so." At the same time, however, he experienced a political awakening after the dissolution of the Soviet Union and noted that instead of demobilizing its armed forces, the US accelerated its reliance on military solutions to problems both economic and political. The result of that militarism, as distinct from domestic defense, is more terrorism against the US and its allies, the loss of core democratic values at home, and the eventual crumbling of the American economy. Of four books he wrote on the topic, the first three are referred to as the Blowback Trilogy. Johnson summarized the intent of the Blowback series in the final chapter of Nemesis.

=== Blowback: The Costs and Consequences of American Empire ===
In Blowback, I set out to explain why we are hated around the world. The concept "blowback" does not just mean retaliation for things our government has done to and in foreign countries. It refers to retaliation for the numerous illegal operations we have carried out abroad that were kept totally secret from the American public. This means that when the retaliation comes – as it did so spectacularly on September 11, 2001 – the American public is unable to put the events in context. So they tend to support acts intended to lash out against the perpetrators, thereby most commonly preparing the ground for yet another cycle of blowback. In the first book in this trilogy, I tried to provide some of the historical background for understanding the dilemmas we as a nation confront today, although I focused more on Asia – the area of my academic training – than on the Middle East.

— Chalmers Johnson, Nemesis: The Last Days of the American Republic (2006)

=== The Sorrows of Empire: Militarism, Secrecy, and the End of the Republic ===
The Sorrows of Empire was written during the American preparations for and launching of the invasions and occupations of Afghanistan and Iraq. I began to study our continuous military buildup since World War II and the 737 military bases we currently maintain in other people's countries. This empire of bases is the concrete manifestation of our global hegemony, and many of the blowback-inducing wars we have conducted had as their true purpose the sustaining and expanding of this network. We do not think of these overseas deployments as a form of empire; in fact, most Americans do not give them any thought at all until something truly shocking, such as the treatment of prisoners at Guantanamo Bay, brings them to our attention. But the people living next door to these bases and dealing with the swaggering soldiers who brawl and sometimes rape their women certainly think of them as imperial enclaves, just as the people of ancient Iberia or nineteenth-century India knew that they were victims of foreign colonization.

— Chalmers Johnson, Nemesis: The Last Days of the American Republic (2006)

=== Nemesis: The Last Days of the American Republic ===
In Nemesis, I have tried to present historical, political, economic, and philosophical evidence of where our current behavior is likely to lead. Specifically, I believe that to maintain our empire abroad requires resources and commitments that will inevitably undercut our domestic democracy and in the end produce a military dictatorship or its civilian equivalent. The founders of our nation understood this well and tried to create a form of government – a republic – that would prevent this from occurring. But the combination of huge standing armies, almost continuous wars, military Keynesianism, and ruinous military expenses have destroyed our republican structure in favor of an imperial presidency. We are on the cusp of losing our democracy for the sake of keeping our empire. Once a nation is started down that path, the dynamics that apply to all empires come into play – isolation, overstretch, the uniting of forces opposed to imperialism, and bankruptcy. Nemesis stalks our life as a free nation.

— Chalmers Johnson, Nemesis: The Last Days of the American Republic (2006)

A former Cold Warrior, he notably stated, "A nation can be one or the other, a democracy or an imperialist, but it can't be both. If it sticks to imperialism, it will, like the old Roman Republic, on which so much of our system was modeled, lose its democracy to a domestic dictatorship."

=== Dismantling the Empire: America's Last Best Hope ===
Johnson outlines how the United States can reverse American hegemony and preserve the American state.

=== Evil Empire ===
In a 2007, during the Iraq and Afghanistan Wars, Johnson gave a series of lectures titled, Evil Empire, as part of his American Empire Project, in which he summed up his trilogy, Blowback: The Costs and Consequences of American Empire, The Sorrows of Empire: Militarism, Secrecy, and the End of the Republic, and Nemesis:The Last Days of the American Republic in speeches titled Evil Empire. The books and lectures are a warning about the unintended consequences of US policy in the world. In June 2007, he gave a talk at a local Democratic Club in Fallbrook, CA which was filmed and released on DVD. It is produced and directed by Jon Monday for mondayMEDIA.

== Death ==
In 2010, Chalmers Johnson died after a long illness from complications of rheumatoid arthritis at his home, in Cardiff-by-the-Sea.

== Works ==
- Johnson, Chalmers A (1962). Peasant Nationalism and Communist Power. Stanford University Press. ISBN 0-8047-0074-5.
- — (1999). An Instance of Treason: Ozaki Hotsumi and the Sorge Spy Ring. Diane Publishing Co. ISBN 0-7881-6748-0.
- — (1966). Revolutionary Change. Little Brown & Company. ISBN 0-316-46730-8.
- Azrael, Jeremy R; Johnson, Chalmers A (1970). Change in Communist Systems. Stanford University Press. ISBN 0-8047-0723-5.
- Johnson, Chalmers A (1973). Conspiracy at Matsukawa. University of California Press. ISBN 0-520-02063-4.
- Israel, John; Johnson, Chalmers A (1972). Ideology and Politics in Contemporary China. University of Washington Press. ISBN 0-295-95247-4.
- Johnson, Chalmers A (1973). Autopsy on People's War. Berkeley, University of California Press. ISBN 0520025164.
- Johnson, Chalmers (1978). Japan's Public Policy Companies. Aei Pr. ISBN 0-8447-3272-9.
- Johnson, Chalmers A (1982). MITI and the Japanese Miracle. Stanford University Press. ISBN 0-8047-1206-9.
- Johnson, Chalmers (1984). The Industrial Policy Debate. Ics Pr. ISBN 0-917616-65-0.
- Johnson, Chalmers A; D'Andrea Tyson, Laura (1989). Politics and Productivity: The Real Story of Why Japan Works. HarperBusiness. ISBN 0-88730-350-1.
- Johnson, Chalmers (1994). Japan: Who Governs? – The Rise of the Developmental State. W. W. Norton & Company. ISBN 0-393-31450-2.
- — (March 1996). "The Okinawan rape incident and the end of the Cold War in East Asia". Quadrant. 40 (3): 23–29.
- Johnson, Chalmers (1999). "The Developmental State: Odyssey of a Concept". In Woo-Cumings, Meredith (ed.). The Developmental State. Cornell University Press. pp. 32–62. doi:10.7591/9781501720383-004. ISBN 978-1-5017-2038-3. S2CID 210497579.
- — (2004). Blowback; The Costs and Consequences of American Empire (2nd ed.). Holt Paperbacks. ISBN 0-8050-7559-3.
- — (2004). The Sorrows of Empire: Militarism, Secrecy, and the End of the Republic. Metropolitan Books. ISBN 0-8050-7004-4.
- — (2007). Nemesis; The Last Days of the American Republic. Metropolitan Books. ISBN 978-0-8050-7911-1.
- — (2010). Dismantling the Empire; America's Last Best Hope. Metropolitan Books. ISBN 978-0-8050-9303-2.

== Audio and video ==
- Audio interview March 2010 on Media Matters with Bob McChesney
- Video/Audio: Chalmers Johnson on the military-industrial complex October 4–7, 2008 on The Real News with Paul Jay
- Audio: Is America on the brink of destruction through imperial over-reach?
- Audio interview April 2004 on Behind the News with Doug Henwood
- Video Interview: Decline of Empires: The Signs of Decay by Ecological Options Network on YouTube

== See also ==
- Developmental State
- Japanese Economic Miracle
- American Imperialism
