= Permission Impossible: Britain's Planners =

- Title card
- Genre: Documentary
- Narrated by: Barbara Flynn
- Theme music composer: Graham Reilly
- Country of origin: United Kingdom
- Original language: English
- No. of series: 1
- No. of episodes: 8

Production
- Executive producer: Kieron Collins
- Producer: Dympna Jackson
- Production location: United Kingdom
- Camera setup: Single-camera
- Running time: 60 minutes
- Production company: BBC Productions Salford

Original release
- Network: BBC Two
- Release: 25 February – 11 March 2014

Related
- The Planners (2013); The Planners Are Coming (2008–09)

Permission Impossible: Britain's Planners is a British fly-on-the-wall television documentary series broadcast on BBC Two, which follows local council planning officers as they deal with applications for planning permission. It is the successor to The Planners.

Permission Impossible: Britain's Planners follows the work of council planning officers in the United Kingdom, including planners from Broxbourne Borough Council, Denbighshire County Council, Cheshire West and Chester Council, Stroud District Council and Torfaen County Borough Council.

The series, which consists of eight episodes, began on 25 February 2014 and was broadcast each week-night from Tuesday to Friday on BBC Two at 7pm, over a two-week period.

== See also ==
- The Planners
- The Planners Are Coming
