= Japan Policy Research Institute =

The Japan Policy Research Institute (JPRI) is a non-profit organization organized under section 501(c)(3) of the U.S. Internal Revenue Code that was founded in 1994 by Chalmers Johnson and Steven C. Clemons in order "to promote public education about Japan, its then growing significance in world affairs, and trans-Pacific international relations." Japan was never the exclusive focus, and JPRI has also published many articles about China, Korea, Southeast Asia, and Inner Asia. JPRI was founded as a membership organization, but moved all publications to the World Wide Web in 2003 and ceased to charge membership fees.
