= Reel History of Britain =

Reel History of Britain is a 20-part series presented by Melvyn Bragg about the history of modern Britain as seen through the eyes of people who were there. It was first broadcast on BBC Two from 5 to 30 September 2011. The programme is a social history documentary charting the course of the twentieth century through archive film, plus interviews and recollections of key events that took place in the one hundred years after the advent of moving film.

In each episode, Bragg goes to a different place in the UK and shows people film in a 1960s Ministry of Technology mobile cinema, then gauges their reactions and captures them on film.

The series has an original score composed by Bert Appermont and Graham Reilly, which was performed by the BBC Philharmonic and recorded at BBC Studios Manchester.
