= Who Is Ghislaine Maxwell? =

2022 American-British documentary television miniseries

- Genre: Documentary
- Directed by: Erica Gornall
- Countries of origin: United States; United Kingdom
- Original language: English
- No. of episodes: 3

Production
- Executive producers: Mike Lerner; Dorothy Byrne
- Producer: Katherine Haywood
- Cinematography: Erica Gornall; Ian Moubayed; Omar Mullick; Beau Molloy
- Editor: Colin Mixon
- Running time: 50 minutes
- Production company: Roast Beef Productions

Original release
- Network: Starz; Channel 4
- Release: June 26 – July 10, 2022

Who Is Ghislaine Maxwell? is a 2022 American-British documentary television miniseries revolving around British sex trafficker Ghislaine Maxwell, directed by Erica Gornall. It consists of 3 episodes and premiered in the United States on June 26, 2022, on Starz, and in the United Kingdom on July 5, 2022, on Channel 4.

== Plot ==
The series follows Ghislaine Maxwell from her early days to her relationship with Jeffrey Epstein, and conviction.

Epstein and Maxwell were in a common-law marriage while being in open relationships. The opposing parties claim that the couple were having relationship with girls under the age of 18.

Maria Farmer says that the teenage girls were promised the opportunity to work as Victoria's Secret models.

== Episodes ==
No.	Title	Directed by	Original release date	Viewers (millions)
1	"Queen Bee"	Erica Gornall	June 26, 2022 (Note: Queen Bee was released on Starz's on-demand and streaming platforms on June 24, 2022.)	0.140
Ghislaine had a romantic friendship with Gianfranco Cicogna from the prominent Italian family of Cicogna. However, Gianfranco Cicogna dies young. Ghislaine spends considerable time at Headington Hill Hall with her father.
2	"In Plain Sight"	Erica Gornall	July 3, 2022	0.109
Maria Farmer (born 1969) goes to work for Jeffrey Epstein in New York City in 1995. Farmer says, "I only worked for Jeffrey and Ghislaine for over a year." She worked as a receptionist at a lobby. Although she herself was not a teenager at the time, she accuses Jeffrey and Ghislaine of bringing teenage girls "in school uniforms." Farmer accuses Ghislaine of scouting teenage girls in school for Jeffrey Epstein. Farmer says that Ghislaine would go around high school areas when female students were being let out. Gretchen Rhodes was a professional massage therapist before Ghislaine Maxwell employed her. She was above the age of majority at the time. She states in the documentary that she is currently a singer.
3	"The Reckoning"	Erica Gornall	July 10, 2022	0.121

== Production ==
Initially set to be a feature-length film, the project evolved into a three-part series, due to the amount of material. The producers wanted to document Ghislaine Maxwell's entire life, including before and after her association with Jeffrey Epstein.

In February 2021, it was announced Erica Gornall would direct a documentary revolving around Ghislaine Maxwell, with Mike Lerner and Dorothy Byrne set to executive produce, with Channel 4 broadcasting in the United Kingdom. In October 2021, Starz was announced to co-produce the series and distribute in the United States.

== Broadcast ==
In the United Kingdom, the series premiered on July 5, 2022, on Channel 4 as Ghislaine Maxwell: The Making of a Monster.

In Germany, the series aired in full on July 25, 2022, on Das Erste as Wer ist Ghislaine Maxwell?.

== See also ==
- Age of consent#Reforms in the 19th and 20th century
