= Nguyet Anh Duong =

American chemical engineer

- Born: 1960 (age 65–66); Saigon, South Vietnam

Nguyet Anh Duong (Vietnamese: Dương Nguyệt Ánh; born 1960 in Saigon) is an American scientist responsible for the creation of an American thermobaric weapon. Her work in bomb and weapons has earned her the nickname "Bomb Lady" by media. She is noted as the "scientist who developed the bomb that ended the war with Afghanistan" by the Vietnamese American National Gala.

== Biography ==
Nguyet Anh Duong was born in 1960 in Saigon, with her family coming from North Vietnam. Her grandfather is a famous poet and official Dương Khuê from Vân Đình Village, Ứng Hòa Rural District of Hà Đông Province (now Vân Đình Commune, Hanoi).

During the Vietnam War, her family left their homeland on April 28, 1975, right before the Fall of Saigon. Becoming one of the Vietnamese boat people, her family eventually arrived in the Philippines. From there, they were assigned to a refugee camp. Her family then contacted the Embassy of the United States, Manila and were given political asylum in the United States. She graduated from the University of Maryland, College Park with both a Bachelor of Science (B.S.) in chemical engineering and a B.S. degree in computer science.

In 1983, Duong started working as a chemical engineer at the Indian Head Naval Surface Weapons Center. From 1991-1999, she managed all Navy basic, exploratory research and advanced development programs in high explosives. She also served as the U.S. Navy focus point for explosives and the transition of Navy explosives into weapon systems, providing consultation to government/military, industries and allied nations. From 1999-2002, she managed all NSWC Indian Head's technical programs in Explosives and Undersea Weapons, from concept through engineering development to production and demilitarization.

Duong successfully assembled and led a team of scientists and engineers to develop a thermobaric bomb. They then proceeded to limited production and delivery to the Air Force, all in an unprecedented period of 67 days.

Throughout her career, Duong successfully led the development and transition of a total of 10 high-performing explosives into 18 different weapons in the past 12 years, which is an unprecedented record of its kind. She has served as a U.S. Delegate at the NATO AC310 Subgroup I for Explosives, and chairman/member of many national and international Panels/Technical Steering Groups.

Since 2002, Duong has been the director of Science and Technology of Naval Surface Warfare Center, U.S. Department of Defense, where she was responsible for Indian Head's overall technical investment strategies, guiding and overseeing research and development programs in all areas of science and technology and focusing these efforts toward the creation of future weapon generations for the United States. From 2009, she has also been the director for the Borders and Maritime Security Division within the United States Department of Homeland Security Science and Technology Directorate.

In addition to chemical work, Duong actively participates in Vietnamese community activities in Southern California. She kept a close relationship with Major General Viet Xuan Luong and musician Nam Lộc. During the 1990s and 2000s, Duong and Nam Loc were the two hosts with the most contributions to the entertainment programs of the Asia Center.

== Private life and political view ==
Duong is married and has three children. She is actively anti-communism, often voicing her opinions against Communist Party of Vietnam and the Vietnamese government in interviews. Her anti-communist activities and weapons inventions were also strongly opposed by some Vietnamese intellectuals, who said she had a distorted view of her homeland and condemned her actions contributing to genocide through weapons.

== Honours ==
In 1999, Duong was awarded the Dr. Arthur E. Bisson Prize for Achievement in Naval Technology and had her name engraved in a plaque on permanent display at the Office of Naval Research. In 2001, she was awarded the Civilian Meritorious Medal for superb leadership, technical expertise and significant contributions to the Department of Defense in the area of High Performance Explosives. In 2007, she was awarded the National Security Medal for significant contributions to the nation in activities related to national security. Duong is also featured in the popular book Changing Our World: True Stories of Women Engineers, which is a 256-page book celebrating the contributions of women to the engineering profession, produced by the Extraordinary Women Engineers Project and Discovery Channel's documentary Future Weapons.

== See also ==
- Lapthe Flora
- Viet Xuan Luong
