= Simon Russell (composer) =

British TV and film composer

Simon Russell is a British composer for TV and film. He has worked on many documentaries and films including James Bluemel's Exodus; Our Journey to Europe, Once Upon a Time in Iraq and Once Upon a Time in Northern Ireland Havana Marking's Afghan Star, Baroque! From St Peter's to St Paul's, Pussy Riot: A Punk Prayer and Lottie Bearshout animation. He composed 52 episodes of the South Korean kids animation series Canimals.

== Awards ==
- 2023: RTS Craft & Design Award winner Original Score - non-scripted for Once Upon A Time In Northern Ireland
- 2024: Emmy Award winner in Outstanding Music & Sound category for the Pussy Riot score

== Filmography ==
=== Feature films ===
- Weak At Denise (Guerilla Films; directed by Julian Nott, 2002)
- Vampire Diary (Bard/Sterling; directed by Mark James, 2007)
- Afghan Star (Roast Beef; directed by Havana Marking, 2009)
- Vote Afghanistan (Roast Beef/More 4, 2010)
- 66 Months (Moving Target; directed by James Bluemel, 2011)
- Silencing The Song (HBO/Roast Beef, 2011)
- The Do Gooders (Roast Beef, 2013)
- A Whole Lott More (Flying V/Roast Beef, 2013)
- Smash And Grab (Roast Beef/BBC Storyville, 2012)
- Pussy Riot (Roast Beef/BBC Storyville/HBO, 2013)
- We Are Many (2014)

=== Animations ===
- Canimals, 52 Episodes (Aardman/Voozclub/BRB)
- Lottie Bearshout – (Wildseed/Disney)

=== Dramas ===
- Don't Leave Me This Way (BBC 1)
- Stand By Your Man (BBC 1)
- Desperados (BBC 1) – 10 part series
- Between The Sheets (Yorkshire) – 6 part series
- Avenging Angels (Granada)

=== Documentaries ===
- Exodus: Our Journey to Europe (Keo Films/BBC 2)
- Once Upon a Time in Northern Ireland (Keo Films/BBC 2)
- The Trapped 13; How we survived the Cave (Netflix)
- Mariupol; the people's story (TopHat/BBC 1)
- Pandemic 2020 (Keo Films/BBC 2)
- Once Upon A Time in Iraq (Keo Films/BBC 2)
- Trouble at TopShop (Voltage/BBC 2)
- Who is Ghislaine Maxwell (Roast Beef/Channel 4)
- Secrets of the Salisbury Poisonings (Discovery+)
- Outbreak: The Virus that shook the World (HardCash/ITV)
- Undercover: Inside China's Digital Gulag (HardCash/ITV)
- The Curry House Kid (Swan Films/Channel 4)
- The Battle for Hong Kong (PBS Frontline/HardCash/Channel 4)
- How to Steal Pigs and Influence People (DragonFly/Channel 4)
- Europe: 10 Years of Turmoil (Brook Lapping/BBC 2)
- Big Sky, Big Dreams, Big Art: Made in USA (ZCZ/BBC 4)
- The Renaissance Unchained (ZCZ/BBC 4)
- The Alps Murders (Rize/Channel 4)
- "Rubens: An Extra Large Story" (ZCZ/BBC 2)
- "Angry White & Proud" (Mentorn/Channel 4)
- "Holbein: Eye of the Tudors" (ZCZ/BBC 2)
- "The Billionaire Base: Dismantling Camp Bastion" (Roast Beef/Channel 4)
- "How the Wild West was won with Ray Mears" (Tin Can Island/BBC 4)
- Mothers, Murderers & Mistresses; Empresses Of Ancient Rome (Hot Sauce/BBC 4) – 3 part series
- The Impressionists (ZCZ/BBC 2) – 4 part series
- The Pet Detectives (Roast Beef/Channel 4)
- Cheetah Kingdom (Anglia/ITV) – 12 part series
- 9 Months Later (Sky Living) – 6 part series
- "Animal Cops; Houston 2014" (Tin Can Island/Animal Planet)
- The Dark Ages; An Age Of Light (ZCZ/BBC 4) – 4 part series
- The Miracle Baby of Haiti (Roast Beef/Channel 4)
- Invite Mr. Wright (Roast Beef/Discovery) – 6 part series 1 & 2
- Win A Baby (Roast Beef/Channel 4)
- The Millionaire & the Murder Mansion (Films of Record/Channel 4)
- Ugly Beauty (ZCZ/BBC 2)
- My Boyfriend The MI5 Hoaxer (Ronachan/Channel 4)
- Islands Of Britain (ITV) – 3 part series
- The Sculpture Diaries (ZCZ/Channel 4) – 3 part series
- Baroque!: From St Peter's to St Paul's (ZCZ/BBC 4) – 3 part series
- Out Of Bounds (Roast Beef/Travel Channel) – 6 part series
- The 9/11 Faker (Films of Record/Channel 4)
- K9 Cops (Animal Planet/Granada) – 15 part series
- Animal Cops; Houston (Granada/Discovery) – 12 part series
- Atlas: Japan Revealed (ZCZ/Discovery)
- The Planners Are Coming (RDF/BBC 1) – 8 part series
- Sudden Death (Sitting In Pictures/National Geographic)
- Sickert vs Sargent (ZCZ/More 4)
- America; The Wright Way (Roast Beef/Travel Channel)
- The Happy Dictator (ZCZ/More4)
- Kazakhstan Swings (ZCZ/More 4)
- The Black Widow (Firecracker/Channel 4)
- The New Al-Qaeda (BBC 1)
- Toulouse-Lautrec; the full story (ZCZ/Channel 4)
- The Michelangelo Code (ZCZ/Channel 4)
- Manuela Saenz (Move A Mountain)
- Paradise Found (ZCZ/Channel 4)
- Hitler's Britain (Lion TV)
- The Real 4400 (Unique/Sky)
- Picking Up The Pieces (Quality Time/Channel 4) – 3 part series
- What Would Jesus Drive (Fulcrum/Channel 4)
- Grand Designs; The Stirling Prize 2004 (Talkback/Channel 4)
- Who Killed My Baby (Films Of Record/Channel 4)
- Every Picture Tells A Story (ZCZ/Five)
- Mark Thomas; Debt Collector (Just About/Channel 4)
- Building Of The Year (ZCZ/Channel 4) – 2000–2004
- Super Cities (ZCZ/Channel 4) – 3 part series
- The Body Jars (Becker/Discovery)
- Picasso; Magic, Sex & Death (ZCZ/Channel 4) – 3 part series
- VIP Weekends (Sitting In Pics/Firewire Films/Discovery) – 6 part series
- Chronique d'une ville occupee (Move A Mountain)

=== TV theme songs ===
- Clive Anderson Now (BBC 1)
- The People's Awards (BBC 1)
- Food Factory (ITV)
- Brian's Boyfriends (ITV)
- Style Challenge (BBC 1)
- Wrecks To Riches (ITV)
- World Cup Wondergoals (Five)
