= 2012 Academy Awards =

2012 Academy Awards may refer to:

- 84th Academy Awards, the Academy Awards ceremony which took place in 2012
- 85th Academy Awards, the Academy Awards ceremony which took place in 2013 honoring the best in film for 2012
