= Hell and Back Again =

- Promotional poster
- Directed by: Danfung Dennis
- Produced by: Danfung Dennis; Martin Herring; Mike Lerner
- Cinematography: Danfung Dennis
- Edited by: Fiona Otway
- Music by: J. Ralph
- Production companies: Roast Beef Productions; Thought Engine Media Group
- Distributed by: New Video (US); Independent (UK)
- Release dates: October 5, 2011 (USA); October 12, 2011 (UK)
- Running time: 88 minutes
- Countries: United States; United Kingdom; Afghanistan
- Languages: English; Pashto; Dari
- Box office: $40,634

Hell and Back Again is a 2011 documentary film produced, shot, and directed by Danfung Dennis, about a sergeant in the United States Marine Corps who returns from the Afghanistan conflict with a badly broken leg and post-traumatic stress disorder.

On January 24, 2012, the film was announced as one of the five nominees for the Academy Award for Best Documentary Feature.

== Background ==
Director Dennis worked as a war photographer in Afghanistan beginning in 2006, however, he became increasingly frustrated with photojournalism. He switched to films and new media to try to "shake people from their indifference to [the Afghanistan] war" and to present a "brutally honest experience of war". Dennis already had begun filming for some time when he was given the opportunity in July 2009 to spend four weeks with the U.S. Marines Echo Company, 2nd Battalion, 8th Marine Regiment. The unit took part in Operation Khanjar, the then-largest air operation since the Vietnam War. On the first day with the Marines, he met Nathan Harris when, despite the high temperatures, Harris gave him his last bottle of water. At first, the film was only focused on the situation in Afghanistan and was going to be titled Battle for Hearts and Minds. Parts of the former film material were used for the segment "Obama's War" in the documentary series Frontline.

Dennis decided seven months later that Harris would be the person around whom the documentary would revolve. At the Marines' homecoming, Harris did not get off the bus, at which point Dennis learned Harris had been wounded. He made contact with Harris after this and invited Dennis to his home. Dennis spent a total of a year with Harris and his wife.

== Production ==
=== Visual style ===
In six months, approximately 100 hours of footage was shot. Dennis and editor Fiona Otway worked closely in the formulation of the visual style. They discussed their views about the war, where it became clear that popular images of war were at odds with Dennis' experiences.

To create an "honest portrayal of war", Dennis combines the two storylines of the mission in Afghanistan and the situation of Nathan Harris in North Carolina in his documentary. Here he uses flashbacks to represent the "disorientation" and "emotional numbness" experienced "leaving a world of life and death" and "coming back to a world that seems mundane and superficial". According to Dennis is there "really just one battle", at home and on the field, rather than two different ones. In another interview he stated that he worked to combine the "ethics of photojournalism", the role of pure observer, with the "narrative of film" to create an "immersive, visceral experience".

Danfung Dennis processed many personal experiences as he did not discuss his footage with Nathan Harris. Harris got to watch the film after its completion.

=== Film technique ===
The documentary was filmed with a Canon EOS 5D Mark II in its entirety. This presented Dennis some challenges, he especially noted the sound, the image stabilization, the focus and the fact that the camera overheated in about 15 minutes due to the high temperatures in Afghanistan. He built a custom camera stabilizer rig with advanced sound equipment and attached it to his body armor when he was not filming. In addition, he focused the camera manually. Simply switching off the camera helped protect it against overheating. For his filming with Harris and his wife, he changed his equipment so it would be as compact as possible and non intrusive. He explained in an interview that his decision to use the Canon EOS 5D Mark II allowed him to combine the "aesthetics of photography" and the "ethics of journalism" with the "narrative documentary" to create an "impressive, comprehensive experience".

In Afghanistan, Dennis used a zoom lens with a focal length of 24mm to 70mm with a maximum aperture of 2.8. Dennis founded the lens choice with the "diversity necessary to get wide and tight shots". He used two normal lenses in Yadkinville: a lens with a focal length of 35 mm with a maximum aperture of 1.4 and a second with a focal length of 50 mm and a maximum aperture of 1.2. Due to the wide aperture he could even film in low light situations.

=== Tone ===
There is no music in the classical sense in the film. Dennis used only natural sounds as background music, which he picked up in Afghanistan and in part significantly altered (see musique concrète). A scene in the film, in which a village is secured, is under-laid with actual sounds of war-fighting which were slowed down to 2% of their original speed. This results in a "persistent drone". Dennis used the same drone in the background of a conversation between Harris and his physician regarding the dangers of painkillers. He tries [to blur] "the line between past and present through sound alone". Dennis stated that Harris' flashbacks "often begin with a sound". He was trying to "convey what it feels like to actually have a flashback".

Dennis and the sound designer J. Ralph worked closely for the film, as did Dennis and editor Fiona Otway. Ralph also wrote the song "Hell And Back", heard during the end credits. The performer of the song is Willie Nelson.

== Release ==
The film was released for the public on October 5, 2011, after having been shown at Sundance Film Festival 2011 and the Moscow International Film Festival 2011. The first weekend the film took US$3,413, where he ran first in a movie theater. Total, the film grossed $40,634. The distribution rights for North America are held by Docurama Films, which released the documentation on January 24, 2012, on Blu-ray and DVD. The broadcasting rights for television were secured by Public Broadcasting Service. There, the documentary aired on May 24, 2012, within the film series Independent Lens. The film was also at the Hot Docs Canadian International Documentary Festival, and between August 24, 2012, and August 31, 2012, in the Canadian Bloor Hot Docs Cinema. On October 12, 2011, the film was released in the UK, France followed on December 21, 2011. In the United Kingdom it grossed $315. The cinema releases in the United Kingdom and France were several broadcasts on the Spanish TV station Canal+ in April and September 2012. The only screening of the documentary in German-speaking countries took place in Austria in 2012 and 2013 at the frame[o]ut-freestyle-Filmfestival and the Filmfestival Kitzbühel.

== Reception ==
The film received critical acclaim. On review aggregator website Rotten Tomatoes, the film holds an approval rating of 100% based on 30 reviews, and an average rating of 7.9 out of 10. On Metacritic, the film has a weighted average score of 81 out of 100, based on 17 critics, indicating "universal acclaim".

Chicago Sun-Times critic Roger Ebert sums up, the film "presents [Harris'] new reality with a stunningly good use of video and sound editing". The final scenes were given an "emotional and stylistic power that we didn't see coming." He therefore rated the film three and a half stars out of four possible stars. Linda Barnard gave it the same rating in a review for the Toronto Star, where she certifies Dennis to handle Harris' story, though this was approaches his subject "with a journalist’s impartiality even as he crafts an emotionally shattering story". V. A. Musetto, a critic for the New York Post, rated the film three out of four stars and called the documentary "bold." The footage was "often stunning". Wesley Morris, film critic for The Boston Globe, said the film is a "ingenious artistic disturbance". Dennis' film is trying to do what has been created in only a few documentaries: to live in the psyche of the subject. Nevertheless, the film don't pretend to know Harris is thinking. Alison Willmore compared the documentary to The Hurt Locker in a review for The A.V. Club. Willmore called it a work of cinéma vérité with "almost distracting beauty" and gives the movie the grade B. Two reviews in the newspapers The Observer and The Guardian agree with the positive tenor. Philip French indicates the film was "painful and deeply moving" and Peter Bradshaw thinks the film doesn't hold back. Bradshaw gave it four out of five stars.

Chris Knight of the National Post had a mixed opinion. He felt manipulated by Dennis' editing. The transitions are indeed "cinematically effective" but felt "emotionally manipulative". By not showing how the war changed Harris, the movie only showed "two-thirds of the picture" was "crying out for a prelapsarian prologue". Lauren Wissot, critic for Slant Magazine, criticized the editing technique and labeled it as partly "distracting and obvious", but the documentation is a "universal soldier's story". Both critic gave the film of two and a half stars out of four possible.

=== Veterans ===
In conjunction with the release of the documentary, the organization Disabled American Veterans launched an awareness campaign about post-traumatic stress disorder. In the same way, the organization Still Serving Veterans used the film to increase the attention for soldiers with post-traumatic stress disorder and organized for this purpose a public screening of Hell and Back Again. Florida State University showed the film at a special "Veterans Day", which was the start of an initiative for a more veteran-friendly university. At the same time the university inaugurated a "student veteran film festival". Danfung Dennis, the producer Karol Martesko window, as well as Nathan Harris and Ashley Harris took part in the event. The veterans' association of the University of Iowa organized a screening of the documentary.

REACT to FILM launched its College Action Network with a screening of Hell and Back Again at American University in Washington, D.C., on September 21, 2011. Director Danfung Dennis spoke to the audience both at the launch event, and in-person and via Skype at subsequent College Action Network screenings across the country.

=== Accolades ===
At the 2011 Sundance Film Festival, the film won the Jury Prize and the Camera Prize for Best Foreign Documentary. Also at the Moscow International Film Festival 2011, the film won the prize for Best Documentary. In addition, it received documentary awards at several smaller film festivals and award ceremonies was awarded. This included IDA Award in the category Jacqueline Donnet Emerging Filmmaker Award, Cinema Eye Honors prize for Outstanding Achievement In Cinematography, the Alfred I. duPont–Columbia University Award 2012 and the Harrell Award for Best Documentary at the Camden International Film Festival 2011.

In addition to the awards won, the film was nominated at some film festivals and award ceremonies. It was nominated for Independent Spirit Award for Best Documentary Feature, and best documentary at Gotham Independent Film Awards and British Independent Film Awards. At the Cinema Eye it was nominated in four categories, and won in the category of outstanding achievement in cinematography. The additional categories were outstanding achievement in direction, best debut feature and outstanding achievement in production.

On January 24, 2012, the film was nominated for an Academy Award in the category of Best Documentary, but lost to the American contribution Undefeated. In response to the nomination, producer Mike Lerner received a congratulation letter from British Prime Minister David Cameron.

Hell and Back Again won the Grierson Award 2012 in the category Best Documentary on a Contemporary Theme – International on November 6, 2012. On 11 July 2013, the documentary was nominated due to its appearance in the program series Independent Lens for a News & Documentary Emmy Award.

Award	Date of ceremony	Category	Recipients and nominees	Result
Sundance Film Festival	January 29, 2011	World Cinema Grand Jury Prize: Documentary	Danfung Dennis	Won
Sundance Film Festival	January 29, 2011	World Cinema Cinematography Award: Documentary	Danfung Dennis	Won
Academy Awards	26 February 2012	Best Documentary Feature	Danfung Dennis	Nominated

Awards
Preceded by The Red Chapel	Sundance Grand Jury Prize: World Cinema Documentary; 2011	Succeeded by The Law in These Parts
