= The Planners =

- Genre: Documentary
- Directed by: Nick Mattingly
- Narrated by: Barbara Flynn
- Country of origin: United Kingdom
- Original language: English
- No. of series: 1
- No. of episodes: 8

Production
- Producer: Dympna Jackson
- Production location: United Kingdom
- Camera setup: Single-camera
- Running time: 1 hour
- Production company: BBC Productions Salford

Original release
- Network: BBC Two
- Release: 31 January – 21 March 2013

Related
- Permission Impossible: Britain's Planners (2014); The Planners Are Coming (2008-2009)

The Planners is a British television documentary series broadcast on BBC Two. It follows the work of local planning officers in the United Kingdom, including planners in Cheshire, Greater Manchester, the Scottish Borders and Gloucestershire.

The series comprises eight episodes and was first broadcast on 31 January 2013.

On 25 February 2014, The Planners returned to BBC Two, however, the name of the programme was changed to Permission Impossible: Britain's Planners.

== See also ==
- Permission Impossible: Britain's Planners
- The Planners Are Coming
