= We Are Many (film) =

- Directed by: Amir Amirani
- Written by: Amir Amirani
- Produced by: Amir Amirani
- Edited by: Adelina Bichis; Martin Cooper
- Music by: Brian Eno; Simon Russell; Alex Baranowski
- Production company: Amirani Media
- Distributed by: We Are Many Productions
- Release dates: 8 June 2014 (Sheffield Doc/Fest); 21 May 2015
- Running time: 110 minutes
- Country: United Kingdom
- Language: English

We Are Many is a documentary film about the February 2003 global day of protest against the Iraq War, directed by Amir Amirani. Social movement researchers have described the 15 February protest as "the largest protest event in human history." Tony Blair's ally Lord Falconer says the anti-war march did change things: "If a million people come out on the streets in the future, then what government is going to say they are wrong now?"

The film's title is an allusion to a line in Percy Bysshe Shelley's poem "The Masque of Anarchy". The film features activists, politicians and celebrities who participated in the march, such as Medea Benjamin from Code Pink, Phyllis Bennis from Institute for Policy Studies, Tony Benn, Lindsey German, Reverend Jesse Jackson, Danny Glover, Damon Albarn, Brian Eno, among others.

After a successful launch in the U.K. and Europe, the film is releasing in North America and globally, under COVID-19 pandemic, in virtual cinemas. The release date is September 21, 2020, International Day of Peace, in an event titled "100 Cities. One Night for Peace." Many of the communities and local organizers from the 2003 protest will partake in this special event.

== See also ==
- The Ground Truth, a 2006 documentary film about veterans of the Iraq War.
- Why We Fight, a 2005 documentary film about the military–industrial complex, and its rise particularly prior to the 2003 Invasion of Iraq.
- 15 February 2003, anti-war protests
- Protests against the Iraq War
