= Danfung Dennis =

Still photographer and filmmaker

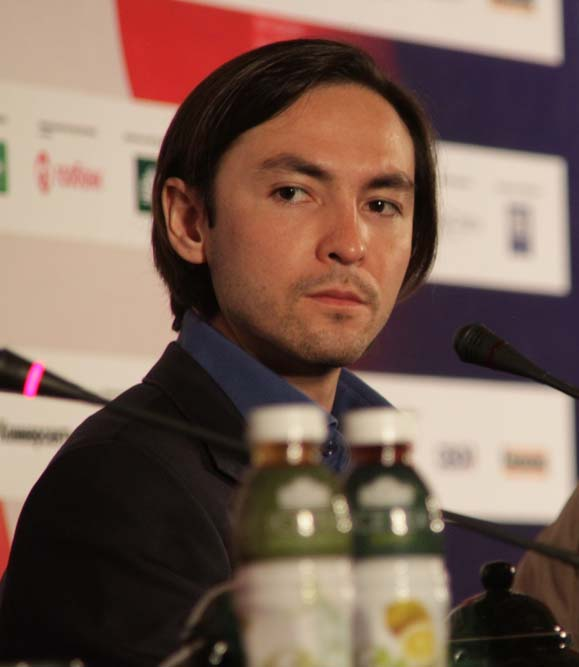
- Dennis at the Moscow International Film Festival
- Occupation(s): Documentary film maker, photographer

Danfung Dennis is a still photographer and documentary film maker. He graduated from the Charles H. Dyson School of Applied Economics and Management. His images have been published in Newsweek, Time, The New York Times, The Washington Post, The Guardian, Rolling Stone, Le Figaro, Financial Times, Mother Jones, Der Spiegel, and The Wall Street Journal.

He won the Bayeux-Calvados Award For War Correspondents in 2010 and was named one of the 25 New Faces of Independent Film by Filmmaker magazine. He was also chosen as one of the 30 New and Emerging Photographers by Photo District News magazine.

He photographed and directed his first feature-length documentary on the war in Afghanistan, Hell and Back Again. The film premiered at the 2011 Sundance Film Festival and won both the World Cinema Jury Award and the World Cinema Cinematography Award. The film was nominated for a 2012 Academy Award for best feature documentary.

Danfung Dennis is currently the CEO and founder of Condition One, a video software company.
