= FYTA =

Greek artist duo

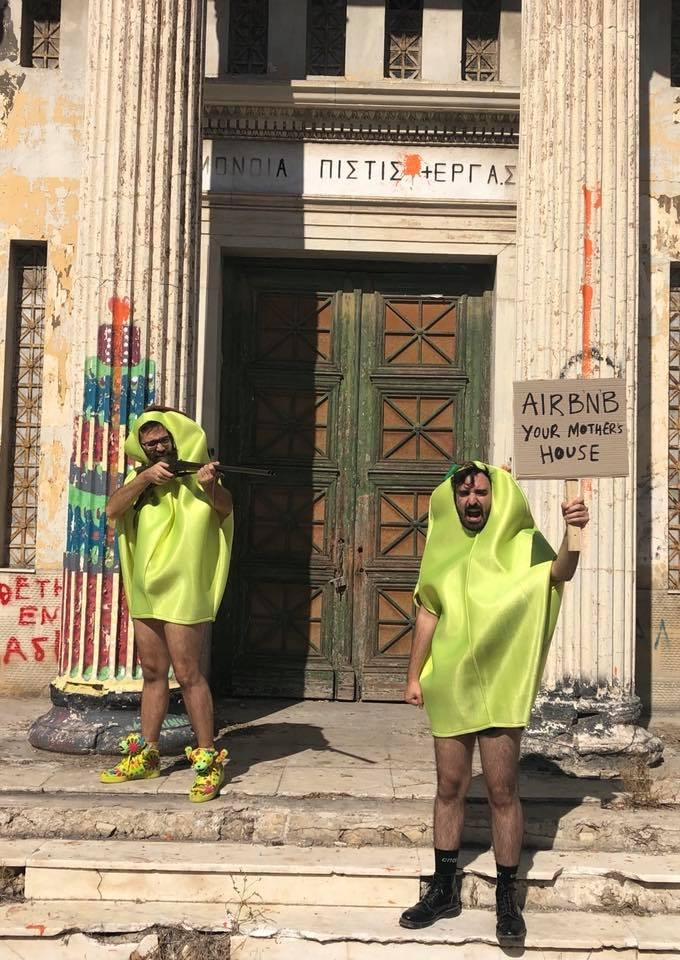
- FYTA at The Garden of Dystopian Pleasures - September 2021
- Born: Fil Ieropoulos; Foivos Dousos
- Known for: Performance art

FYTA (Greek: ΦΥΤΑ, meaning plants) are an Athens-based conceptual art and performance art duo. Their work problematises Greek identity and nationalism. FYTA's work combines different media and disciplines mostly operating within the wider framework of overidentification, queer politics and anti-humanist art, while they aim at a performative destabilisation of concepts of truth and nature / the natural.

== Background ==
"Fyta are far from a fringe group in the Greek art world" and curate regular shows working with the Athens queer community as well as producing artefacts of their own. In an article about Greek queer politics and aesthetics, the Journal of Greek Media and Culture described the work of FYTA as “highly iconoclastic” and “new directors who seem to follow their own path”. Dazed has named their curatorial work as “avant-garde”, while they are also seen as having “an important characteristic often missing by many fine artists: irony and a sense of humour”.

== Work ==
Their artistic work has been shown at The Scala London, NGBK Berlin, Berlin Porn Film Festival, Cuntemporary London, Bâtiment d'art contemporain, Gdańska Galeria Miejska, the Onassis Cultural Centre, and the Zoumboulakis Gallery. In 2013, they participated at the 4th Athens Biennale, AGORA.

=== Publications ===
The Black Book of FYTA (2017) contains descriptions and photos of FYTA's work with analyses on arts and politics by academics. It received a distinction at the "Artist Catalogue design" category at the EBGE_Greek Design and illustration awards 2018.

In 2021, they published an article in Studies in Theatre and Performance on their curation of The Garden of Dystopian Pleasures reflecting on the role of critical artistic practice in responding to contemporary right-wing radicalisation.

=== Academic presentations ===
They have given academic presentations at the London College of Communication, Royal Holloway University, Athens School of Fine Arts, Buckinghamshire New University, and the Athens Museum of Queer Arts.

In 2020, they co-curated the conference "Psychoanalysis and Post-Truth" at the Freud Museum in London, in partnership with Waiting Times - a multi-stranded research project on the temporalities of healthcare funded by The Wellcome Trust. The conference presented the work of contemporary thinkers including Yannis Stavrakakis, Renata Salecl, Richard Seymour, Disnovation.org and ContraPoints.

=== Opera ===
In 2020, they were commissioned by the Greek National Opera to direct a version of Monteverdi's L'Orfeo, but the premiere did not happen because of lockdown measures for the COVID-19 epidemic.

In 2021, the opera was shot as a film titled ORFEAS2021 and was premiered at the 62nd Thessaloniki Festival. The opera is about the struggles of Orfeas, the first gay prime minister of Greece, against a history of oppression in the “land of heroes.” It is dedicated to the memory of activist Zackie Oh!

Vice said of it "the first queer opera in Greece speaks about the dark side of our society" and Anouchka Grose said it is "both an emotional slap and a powerful piece of political polemic".

=== Film ===
In January 2024 they released Avant-Drag! which premiered at several prestigious international film festivals, including the International Film Festival Rotterdam, Thessaloniki International Documentary Festival, the Sarajevo Film Festival, and the Raindance Film Festival, where it was nominated for Best Documentary Feature. The documentary explores the underground drag scene in Athens, Greece, focusing on ten drag performers who challenge societal norms by deconstructing gender, nationalism, and identity, all while facing issues such as police brutality, transphobia, and racism.

The film has received widespread critical acclaim being described as "powerful" by Dana Barbuto in the Boston Movie News, as "unmissable" by Marcel Schlutt in Kaltblut, and described as "profound and moving" by Charlie Kaufman.

== List of exhibitions and events ==
- 2012 On Being Sane in Sunny Places, Panke, Berlin
- 2013 Τα Τρωκτικά / The Great Garbie, Embros Theatre, Athens
- 2013 Fyta Bianella, Athens Biennale 4, Athens
- 2014 ΦΥΤΙΝΗ ιβέντ 1, Coo Cafe Bar, Thessaloniki
- 2014 Instant Psyconalysis, Apiary Studios, London
- 2014 Enjoy (y)our State of Emergency, nGBK, Berlin
- 2014 Sound::Gender::Feminism::Activism, London. College of Communication
- 2015 Sound Acts I, KET, Athens
- 2015 Twisting C(r)ash, Le Commune, Geneva
- 2016 Queertafios, Athens Museum of Queer Arts
- 2016 A Politics of Lies, Circuits & Currents, Athens
- 2016 Twisting C(r)ash II, Romantso, Athens
- 2016 Sound Acts II, KET, Athens
- 2016 Rita Sue project, Athens School of Fine Arts
- 2016 Lemonopita, Lage Egal, Berlin
- 2016 Hypnos Project, Onassis Cultural Centre, Athens
- 2016 Conceptual Song-Writing & Object-Oriented Synthesis, Athens Museum of Queer Arts
- 2016 Technology & Transformations, Buckinghamshire New University, High Wycombe
- 2016 The Equilibrists, New Museum & Benaki Museum, Athens (resigned)
- 2016 Zuckerschock!, P71, Berlin
- 2016 Deep Trash: Greek Trash, Bethnal Green Working Men's Club, London
- 2017 Queer : Unqueer, Atopos cvc (International Museum Day), Athens
- 2017 The Death of Queer, Athens Festival Peiraios 260
- 2017- (ongoing) The ABC of FYTA, podcast, Spotify
- 2017 Sound Acts III, Athens & Epidaurus Festival
- 2017 5 Years of FYTA, Atopos cvc residency, Athens
- 2017 Resurrection with Documena, Baggeion Hotel, Athens
- 2017 Laboratorium Research vol. 2, Gdańska Galeria Miejska, Gdansk
- 2017-8 Waiting for the Barbarians, Athens Biennale
- 2018 Cabaret Negatif, Athens Biennale (cancelled)
- 2018 Queer Approaches to Lena Platonos, Greek National Opera, Athens
- 2018 The Real Athens Queer DIY, Berlin Porn Film Festival, 2018
- 2018 The Garden of Dystopian Pleasures, Athens School of Fine Arts
- 2018 Glam Slam! Cabaret Voltaire, Athens
- 2018 Borderline Offensive, House of Humour, Sofia (resigned)
- 2018 Memes and Online Discourse in Greece, Atopos cvc, Athens
- 2018 Pokémon Poetry, Atopos cvc, Athens
- 2019 The Social Contract & Its Discontents, Athens School of Fine Arts
- 2019 Athens Festival of Queer Performance, Feminist Autonomous Centre for Research, Athens
- 2019 Euronoize, The Scala, London
- 2020 200 Years of Suffocation, Online Festival
- 2020 Psychoanalysis & Post-Truth, Freud Museum, London
- 2020-21 ORFEAS2020/ORFEAS2021, Greek National Opera, Athens
- 2021 Gardening, Zoumboulakis Gallery, Athens
