= CHASOS =

Art activism project by Andreas Heusser

CHASOS was a satirical art activism project, launched 2011 by Andreas Heusser. It consisted of several actions performed by the pastor Wilfried Stocher as president of a fictitious charity organization "Christian Humanitarian Asylum Self-Aid Organization Switzerland" (CHASOS).

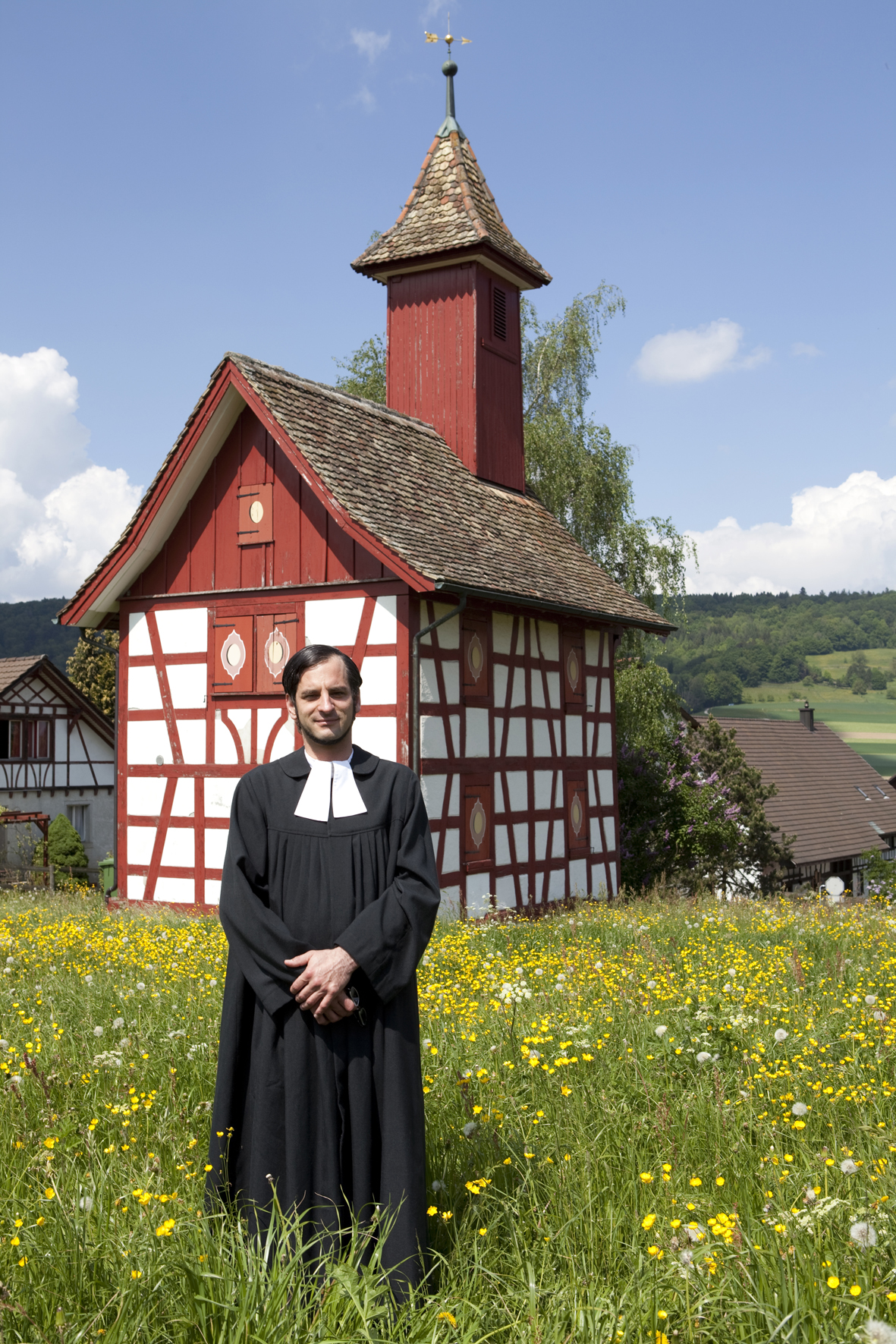
Pastor Wilfried Stocher in front of his church in Schleinikon, Switzerland, 2011

== Inspiration ==
The project was launched in 2011 in response to political debates on the feared influx of refugees to Switzerland due to the Arab Spring. At the time some Swiss politicians, such as Lukas Reimann, SVP, and Christian church representatives were not concerned about how to help, but how to avoid the refugees. The satirical project was aimed to question the moral status of these arguments by means of subversive affirmation and parody.

== Activities ==
=== Prevention campaign for foreigners ===
The project started with the publication of a propaganda video where Stocher addresses potential "waves of refugees" and tries to deter them from "rolling" into Switzerland. The video was a satire on a previous deterrence TV spot produced by the Swiss Government which was aimed at potential immigrants from Africa.

=== Petition for art relocation ===
Stocher next launched an online petition which demanded that all funds for artists and cultural institutions should be suspended, and that their funds and spaces should be used for refugee aid. The petition triggered outraged reactions, especially among artists.

=== Refugee camp hall 32 ===
During the Art Basel, a refugee camp only equipped with the bare essentials was installed in hall Nr. 32. It was electronically secured with a high barbed wire fence and video monitored. Its main function was not to give shelter to refugees, but to protect the Swiss population by imprisoning them. According to the artist, it was the original intention to have it populated with "real" refugees during the duration of the Art Basel, but the prospect participants left before the start of the project.

== Reception ==
The project was covered in a blog discussing the question of how far political art can or must go to gain attention.
