= OLAF (Organization to solve the foreigner question) =

2010 Swiss satirical art activism project

OLAF was a satirical art activism project launched in 2010 by Andreas Heusser, Christoph Nüssli and Christoph Oeschger to subvert the Swiss right-wing populist party's campaign on the deportation initiative. The project consisted of the creation of the "Organization to solve the foreigner question" and series of actions and pranks performed by the fictitious representatives, Dr. Alois B. Stocher and his assistant George Klein.

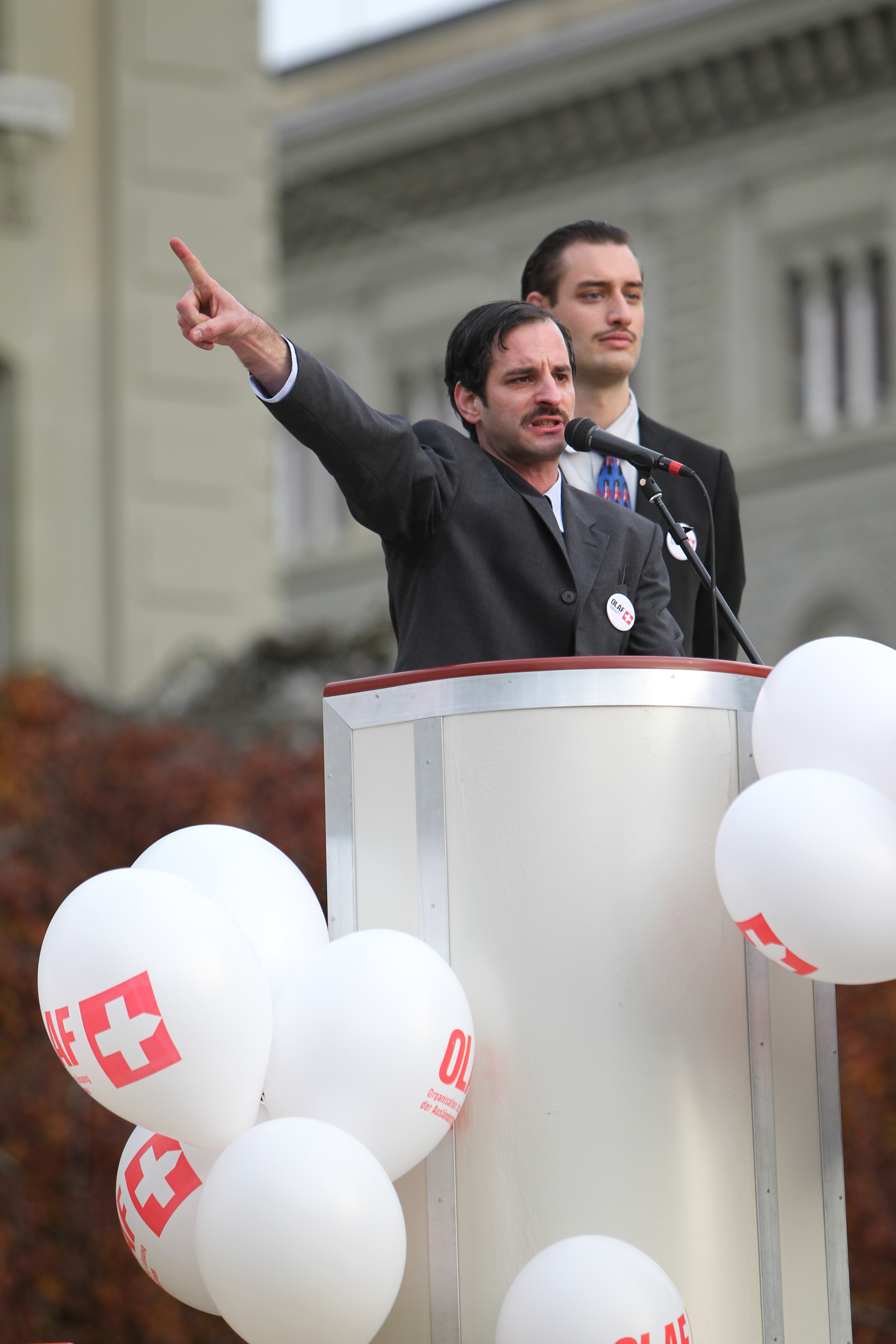
Dr. Alois Stocher, president of OLAF, and his assistant George Klein. Federal square in Bern, 2010

== Art vs. Politics ==
As Heusser and Nüssli explained in a TV interview, the goal was to use the means of art to create a "counterweight to the xenophobic, million-dollar campaign" of the Swiss People's Party. Methods like subversive affirmation, provocation and parody were used to gain the attention of the media which served as multipliers of the project.

Superficially OLAF appeared to be a partner organization of the nationalist Swiss People's Party (SVP), which wanted to automatically expel all criminal foreigners through its deportation initiative. The vote was prepared by the SVP with the controversial Black-Sheep-Campaign and a suggestive survey of the Swiss population which led to accusations of inciting xenophobia and violating international law. However, OLAF even went one step further: in order to tackle the problem of foreigners at its roots, not only criminal foreigners should be deported, – according to OLAF – but all foreigners, because only foreigners can become criminal foreigners.

In numerous propaganda videos, brochures and posters, OLAF took elements and arguments of the SVP's populist campaign and exaggerated them ad absurdum. Dr Alois Stocher quickly collected friends from the right-wing political spectrum on Facebook who did not see through the project as satire, but were enthusiastic about Stocher's radical ideas. OLAF's website (volksbefreiung.ch) was modelled on the SVP's campaign website (volksbefragung.ch) in terms of structure and aesthetics. Photomontages and ambiguous texts parodied the positions of the SVP and brought the Volkspartei close into line of the National Socialists. As a result, the actors received massive threats from both the political right and left, who took the project and persona seriously.

== People's liberation ==
In order to liberate the Swiss population from foreign infiltration, OLAF's website also offered an online form which could be used to propose unwanted foreigners for deportation. It was then possible to follow live which foreigners received the most votes which was presented in form of "deportation charts". The 10 foreigners with the most votes would be directly expelled every week, OLAF promised.

== National Collection Day for Foreigners ==
Dr. Alois B. Stocher and George Klein also made appearances in real life. The highlight of the OLAF campaign was the so-called "National Collection Day for foreigners" on the Bundesplatz in Bern where a yellow container was installed to collect and deport all foreigners who the Swiss population no longer wanted in the country. In addition, there was a stand with information materials on OLAF and SVP, as well as armbands (sorted by cultural descent), which were used for the preventive marking of foreigners.

== Press conference intervention and legal pursuits ==
The press conference on 9 November was announced by the SVP to present the results of their survey of the Swiss population on their resentments towards foreigners. As Alois B. Stocher entered the stage to present the solutions for the problems identified by the survey, he was forced to leave by the security staff. As a result, the SVP threatened a legal action against OLAF, as many media reported. However, this turned out to be another hoax, staged by OLAF.

== Reception ==
The project attracted considerable attention in the Switzerland and abroad and was controversially discussed in online magazines and print media. However, the majority of the Swiss population was unimpressed and accepted the SVP's deportation initiative on 28 November 2010.

For a long time the project was deliberately kept anonymous in order to achieve a stronger political impact, until Andreas Heusser was involuntarily outed by a tabloid newspaper.
