= Jozia =

- Born: Rose Lukhele; 25 March 1993 (age 33)
- Origin: Daveyton, South Africa
- Genres: Indie, Folk, Indie Pop, Alternative R&B, Afropop, Soul
- Occupations: Independent artist, singer, songwriter, director, actress
- Instrument: Vocals
- Years active: Since 2015
- Label: recordJet

Jozia (born 1993) is a South African singer, songwriter, director and actress. She sings in Sepedi, Zulu, Xhsosa, Xevenda and English.

== Music career ==
Jozia was born in 1991 in Daveyton, a township near Johannesburg. After Highschool she worked in Cape Town to fund her music studies that she eventually started in 2015 at COPA in Johannesburg. At this time, she had already recorded dozens of songs on her mobile phone, based on vocal improvisations and instrumental loops. In 2015 she was invited to Switzerland to record her songs at morph2 Recording Studio in Zurich where she was working together with Dutch Guitarist Jordi Kemperman and British Sound Engineer Nigel Hilbourne. After releasing her debut EP At Last with the German music label RecordJet, she performed her first few gigs in Switzerland and the Netherlands, including at Openair Literature Festival Zurich.

In March 2017, she released her first full album entitled Mamokebe, recorded with Kevin Leicher at Darkstar Studio in Johannesburg and produced by the Swiss-based Foundation Society of Arts. The release was accompanied by four music videos, filmed in various places in the US, Mexico, Europe and Africa.

== Musical style ==
Even though Jozia has been compared to female singers like Tracy Chapman or Erykah Badu, she cites artists such as Björk, David Bowie, Thom Yorke, and Amy Winehouse as key influences in the pursuit of her own musical and artistic vision.

Her lyrics reflect much of her history and life in South Africa as well as her time spent abroad, exploring topics like love and loss, otherness and alienation, puberty and identity, marihuana and democracy – typically spiced up with wordplays, poetic ambiguity and a subtle humour.

== Discography ==
=== EPs ===
- 2016: At Last

=== Singles ===
- 2017: "Dlozilame"
- 2017: "Mamokebe"
- 2017: "Julio"
- 2017: "Njalo"

=== Albums ===
- 2017: Mamokebe
