= Der Krieg =

Der Krieg is the Austrian anti-fascist militant organization founded by the Russian-born political artists Oleg Vorotnikov, the leader of the Russian art group Voina, and his wife Natalia Sokol, the Voina's coordinator, in Styria in the middle of 2018.

The organization, in addition to the artists, may include members of one of the Caucasus criminal groups operating in Austria and migrants of different origin arrived in the country illegally.

According to the organizers, Der Krieg aims to "resist the establishment of a fascist regime in Austria".

Until September 2018 the headquarters of Der Krieg was located at the Austrian residence of the Voina group in the Eastern Alps near the city of Deutschlandsberg.

== Persecution ==
From September 11, 2018 EKO Cobra, the сounter-terrorism police tactical unit of the Federal Ministry of the Interior, was engaged by the Austrian authorities to search and arrest Sokol and Vorotnikov at their residence.

September 20 the European arrest warrant (EAW) for Oleg Vorotnikov on charges of illegal weapons possession and trafficking was issued by the Austrian police.

September 22 EKO Cobra equipped with helicopters, a military engineering vehicle and a squad with dogs stormed the Voina residence and partly destroyed the mountain chalet, a central residence building.

September 23 Vorotnikov has been charged with creating and running an illegal militant group.

== Custody ==
On September 11, 2018 Natalia Sokol on the fourth week of pregnancy and her three children 9-year-old boy Kasper (known as an associate curator of the VII Berlin Biennale of Contemporary Art, 6-year-old girl Mama and 3-year-old girl Troïtsa were arrested in the Voina residence just after the children returned from school. It was the first school day for Kasper and Mama in Austria, Mama started her first grade in the elementary school of Deuchlandsberg. Sokol and her children were escorted to the city prison of Graz (PAZ Graz: 8010 Graz Neubaugasse 1) where they were detained together in the cell no. 303.

== Trial ==
The first hearings of the Der Krieg case were held in the Criminal Court of the city of Graz chaired by Judge Andreas Lenz on December 3, 2018 and January 16, 2019

== Indictment ==
May 9, 2019 Sokol and Vorotnikov both have been charged with creating and running a militant anti-fascist group and arms trafficking.

Citing a final version of the indictment, they have been charged with involvement in the creation and leadership of a militant group called ‘Der Krieg’ (‘The War’ or ‘Voina’ in Russian).

The group's activity, according to the indictment, is aimed at inciting murder and violence, causing serious material damage to governmental property, military infrastructure, culture monuments and sites of religious worship as well as inflicting serious bodily harm on officials on duty and perpetrating a range of other offences.

Vorotnikov and Sokol are also charged with arms trafficking on the territory of Austria. In a previous indictment filed in January 2019 Vorotnikov was charged with weapons smuggling. However, that charge was dropped after all melee weapons and firearms seized from Vorotnikov at the time were found to be of Austrian origin.

In addition to that, Vorotnikov has been accused of dodging investigative procedures and resisting legal proceedings in his case.

Austria has issued an Interpol (international) warrant for Vorotnikov's arrest. The police believe that Vorotnikov might be hiding from prosecution in one of the EU member states.

== Appeal ==
On the appeal accepted by Judge Markus Mayrhold to consider at the Federal Administrative Court of Austria in Vienna, the details of the arrest and imprisonment of Sokol and her children in city prison of Graz were revealed.

During the arrest and the interrogations, the Austrian police officers forced the children to stand facing the wall with hands behind head and forbade them to look towards the police. As confirmed in court, Sokol and her children were kept in torture conditions and subjected to round-the-clock surveillance in prison. On September 12, 2018, the prison guards attacked the mother right in front of the children. Two warders beat Sokol with an iron door of the 'family' cell no. 303 for a request to give back the children their warm clothes confiscated during the arrest. Walks in the prison yard are prohibited both to mother and the children throughout the entire term of imprisonment.

== Current situation ==
According to Radio Liberty, the four Sokol's children are under Austrian government care. Echo of Moscow reports that the fate of the children is unknown.

May 20, 2019 Oleg Vorotnikov was arrested in Germany, the federal state of Brandenburg.

== See also ==
- Voina
- Natalia Sokol
