= Fil Ieropoulos =

Greek filmmaker and academic

- Φιλ Ιερόπουλος
- Born: 1 June 1978 (age 48); Athens, Greece
- Occupations: Filmmaker; artist; academic
- Years active: 2002–present

Fil Ieropoulos (/iɛˈroʊpʊləs/; Greek: Φιλ Ιερόπουλος, romanized: Fil Ieropoulos; born June 1, 1978) is a Greek filmmaker, artist and academic. His experimental films combine various media, performance and queer politics. He is one half of the conceptual art duo FYTA.

== Biography ==
Fil Ieropoulos studied film and cultural studies in the UK, completing his PhD on the film poem at the University for the Creative Arts in 2010.

== Work ==
His first feature film, sci-fi opera ORFEAS2021, competed at the Thessaloniki International Film Festival. The film paid homage to and was dedicated to queer activist Zak Kostopoulos. ORFEAS2021 was nominated for the Greek Academy Awards.

His second feature film, the documentary Avant-Drag!, showcasing the life of Athenian drag performers, premiered at the International Film Festival Rotterdam in 2024. The film received wide coverage and critical success. Phuong Le's review for The Guardian gave the film four stars, calling it "a kaleidoscopic portrait of the city's vibrant underground".

His third feature film, Uchronia, based on Arthur Rimbaud's Une Saison En Enfer is set to premiere at the 76th Berlin International Film Festival. Charlie Kaufman is amongst the film's executive producers.

== Filmography ==
=== Feature films ===
Year	Title	Director	Producer
2021	ORFEAS2021	Yes	No
2024	Avant-Drag!	Yes	Yes
2026	Uchronia	Yes	Yes
