= Natalia Sokol =

Russian artist (born 1980)

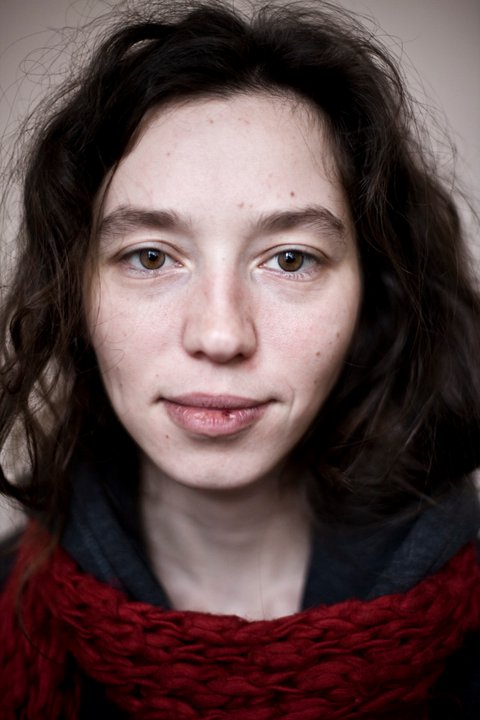
- Born: June 3, 1980 (age 46); Balakovo, Soviet Union
- Other names: Koza, Kozlionok
- Education: PhD of Physics in the Lomonosov Moscow State University
- Known for: Voina
- Spouse: Oleg Vorotnikov
- Children: 3

Natalia Sokol, aka Koza, is a founder of the Russian political artist group Voina, formed in 2005 alongside her husband Oleg Vorotnikov.

== Life and work ==
Sokol studied Molecular Physics in the Lomonosov Moscow State University. She finished with a PHD on "Optical Properties of Protein Solutions Containing Heavy Metal Ions" in 2006. She then began working at the Department of Molecular Physics, Faculty of Physics, MSU, planning to continue her research work in relation to the fight against blood cancer. As she was a member of Voina, this career was not compatible with the State University objectives. April 17, 2012, she was illegally, in violation of Russian law, fired from MSU at the time of leave to care for her second child, Mama.

Since its formation, Voina has made headlines for agitating public space and openly critiquing the Putin administration.

Natalia Sokol, better known by her artistic name Koza, is the author, coordinator, and performer of the Voina works, including, but not limited to:

- Mordovian Hour, 2007, Throwing Cats in McDonald's
- Fuck for the heir Puppy Bear!, 2008, Pre-Election Orgy in Biological Museum
- Cop in a Priest's Robe, 2008, 21st Century Russian Hero Gets Food for the Comrades by Robbing a Supermarket
- Decembrists Commemoration, 2008, Voina Сelebrates Moscow City Day by Executing through Hanging Two Homosexuals and Three Illegal Migrant Workers inside the City's Biggest Mall
- Storming the White House, 2008, Voina Troop Takes the Russian Parliament under the Skull and Bones Laser Drawing
- Cock in the Ass, 2009, Punk Concert in the Court
- Leo the Fucknut is Our President!, 2010, Blue Bucket Attack on President's Guard Limousine
- Dick Captured by KGB, 2010, Giant Dick on Bridge
- Palace Revolution, 2010, Reformation of the Ministry of Police by Playing Football with a Child

== Legal disputes ==
While Sokol was working as an artist and activist in Russia, she experienced clashes with the Russian police.

On March 3, 2011, Natalia Sokol was beaten by police on the street after a public lecture. Her child, Kasper, and other activists in attendance were injured. Sokol's camera was broken.

On March 31, 2011, Kasper was kidnapped during a demonstration on the street in the center of Saint Petersburg by Russian police. Sokol and her husband, Oleg Vorotnikov, were arrested. Later, Sokol and Vorotnikov discovered police had brought their son into the City Children's Hospital as an unidentified child. The family reunited following Sokol's escape from a police van.

Another criminal case against Sokol was opened in which she was accused of assaulting and insulting police officers. It is alleged she was then pressured and threatened by the Russian authorities with both forced labor and imprisonment. Authorities issued an arrest warrant for Sokol in her absence, while Russian police announced that Sokol was also declared an internationally wanted criminal searched by Interpol.

The night of October 18, 2011, Sokol and her 2-year-old son Kasper were arrested after meeting with German TV channel ARD. They escaped after spending the night behind bars.

In December 2011, the Dzerzhinsky District Court in Saint Petersburg issued an arrest warrant for Sokol. Voina claimed that Natalia Sokol was charged with insulting and using violence against police officers (articles 319 and 318 of the Criminal Code). The charges were first revealed to the defense during a court session on December 6, 2011. Her attorney expressed his indignation and denied the investigator's claims that Natalia had missed her arraignments on multiple occasions. However, the judge sided with the investigators to arrest Natalia Sokol in absentia.

At that time, Sokol, who was pregnant with her second child, consulted a specialized medical facility "Women Consultant", where she sought medical assistance. Instead, the doctors called the police. Subsequently, Mama, Sokol's daughter, was born in hiding.

In 2012 Natalia together with other leaders of Voina was announced as an associated curator of Berlin Biennale.

On April 28, 2015, Natalia Sokol while speaking at a public event in Zurich, asked for political asylum, claiming that her husband and her children aged four and six were still in Russia.

Natalia arrived in Switzerland while nine months pregnant with her third child, separated from her husband and co-founder of Voina, Oleg Vorotnikov, and their two children, Kasper (then 6 years old) and Mama (then 3 years). Vorotnikov and their children were unable to legally join Sokol at the time, as they were legally undocumented. As of November 2011, Oleg Vorotnikov is wanted by Interpol.

On March 20, 2016, Natalia Sokol, Oleg Vorotnikov, and their three children were attacked by an armed mob of 20 people in their apartment in Basel. The perpetrators broke the door to family's apartment, attacked the parents and children with tear gas and kidnapped the naked children while they were bathing. The perpetrators bound Vorotnikov's hands and legs with Scotch tape and strangled him. Following Oleg's assault, they attacked Sokol with wooden sticks. The attackers stole laptops belonging to Voina, including hard drives containing artistic and scientific archives, and iPads belonging to the children. On November 10, 2017, Voina published video documentation of the attack. The video shows an armed attack on the family and the kidnapping of their children by an armed group of the ‘Wasserstrasse’ organization, self-proclaimed Swiss human right activists. The video of the crime was confiscated by the police. The Basel prosecutor office opened a criminal case against Sokol and Vorotnikov for their attempts to attract media attention towards the attack.

Prosecution identified the crimes committed against the family as follows: multiple counts of kidnapping, deprivation of liberty, repeated attempts to endanger life, multiple counts of coercion, physical assault, multiple counts of intent to inflict serious bodily injury, robbery, multiple counts of material damage, trespassing, multiple counts of violence and threat to authorities and officials, and disturbance of peace.

Amnesty International acknowledged the xenophobic nature of the attack on family in Switzerland.

Vorotnikov stated in an interview with Radio Free Europe that the family wants to return Russia but worries about the fate of their three children.

On March 2, 2018, Voina arrived in Graz, Austria, to participate in the Elevate Festival under the topic 'Risk and Courage'. At the festival, a documentary of the kidnapping Voina's kids by an armed group of Swiss extremists was presented to the public for the first time. There was backlash to the video, with some festival participants requesting to be completely removed from the showing.

On September 11, 2018, Natalia Sokol and her three children were arrested in the residence of the Voina Group in the Eastern Alps, the Federal Land of Styria, just after the children returned from school. Sokol and her children were escorted to the city prison of Graz (PAZ Graz: 8010 Graz Sauraugasse 1), where they all were imprisoned in the cell no. 303.

On September 20, 2018, the European arrest warrant (EAW) for Sokol's husband, the leader of the Voina Group, Oleg Vorotnikov (Vor of Voina) on charges of illegal weapons possession and trafficking was issued by the Austrian police.

According to Sokol and her husband, Austrian authorities used the 'Einsatzkommando Cobra' special anti-terrorism unit, equipped with helicopters and a squad with dogs to search and arrest Vorotnikov. 'Cobra' stormed the Voina residence, partly destroying the mountain chalet.

On her appeal at the Federal Administrative Court of the Republic of Austria in Vienna, Sokol described the arrest and imprisonment of herself and her children in Graz City Prison. According to Sokol, she and her children were kept in torture conditions and subjected to round-the-clock surveillance in prison, and on September 12, 2018, the prison guards attacked the mother in front of the children; two warders beat Sokol with an iron door of the 'family' cell no. 303 for a request to give the children their warm clothes confiscated during the arrest. Walks in the prison yard were prohibited both to mother and the children throughout the entire term of imprisonment.

In May 2019, together with her husband and the leader of Voina Oleg Vorotnikov, Sokol was charged by the Austrian police with creating and running a militant anti-fascist group and arms trafficking. Citing a final version of the indictment, Sokol has been charged with involvement in the creation and leadership of a militant group called ‘Der Krieg’ (‘The War’ or ‘Voina’ in Russian). Austria has issued an international warrant for Vorotnikov's arrest.

The group's activity, according to the indictment, is aimed at inciting murder and violence, causing serious material damage to governmental property, military infrastructure, culture monuments and sites of religious worship as well as inflicting serious bodily harm on officials on duty and perpetrating a range of other offences.

Sokol is also charged with arms trafficking on the territory of Austria. In a previous indictment filed in January 2019, she was charged with weapons smuggling. However, that charge was dropped after all melee weapons and firearms seized from her at the time were found to be of Austrian origin.

Sokol and her three children were imprisoned in Austria until January 2019, and then transferred to the Traiskirchen refugee camp. Sokol was taken into custody in September 2018 as Vorotnikov's alleged accomplice in the creation of Der Krieg and the arms trade.

== See also ==
- Voina
- Der Krieg
