= No Show Museum =

- Established: 2015
- Location: Johannesburg and Zürich
- Type: Art museum
- Director: Andreas Heusser
- Website: www.noshowmuseum.com

The No Show Museum is an art museum, established in Zurich, Switzerland in 2015, devoted to nothing and its various manifestations throughout the history of art. It describes itself as the first museum dedicated to the concept of nothingness in art. Founded by Swiss conceptual artist and curator Andreas Heusser, the museum's collection today includes around 500 works and documents from over 150 international artists of the 20th and 21st centuries.

== Virtual collection ==
The museum's collection is freely accessible online and displays works, documents, and artifacts from conceptual art, minimalist art, performance art, and painting, as well as from photography, literature, theatre, film, and music. In all, the collection extends over four floors, each with two wings, and with various tracts that are thematically dedicated to different way of approaching nothing:

- Nothing as Refusal: The Art of Doing Nothing
- Nothing as Annihilation: The Art of Destruction
- Nothing as Emptiness: The Art of Absence
- Nothing as Invisibility: The Art of The Imperceptible, The Unseen, and The Hidden
- Nothing as Reduction: The Art of Minimalism
- Nothing as Lacuna: The Art of Omission
- Nothing as Statement: The Art of Saying Nothing
- Nothing as Notion: The Art of Pure Imagination

The museum also provides background information in German, Spanish and English about all the works and artists. In addition, there is library that provides texts, publications, and exhibition catalogues for further research on nothing in art and other disciplines (philosophy, science, literature, music, etc.)

== Mobile museum ==
=== Converted bus ===
Since 2015, the No Show Museum has been on a world tour with a converted bus. Inside, the mobile museum is a futuristic white cube (4 m long, 2 m wide, 2.10 m high), in which the current special exhibition is shown. It also offers access to the virtual collection via ipad stations and includes a selection of conceptual souvenir items related to the museum’s theme. The black-painted exterior of the bus functions as a writable surface for exhibition announcements. .

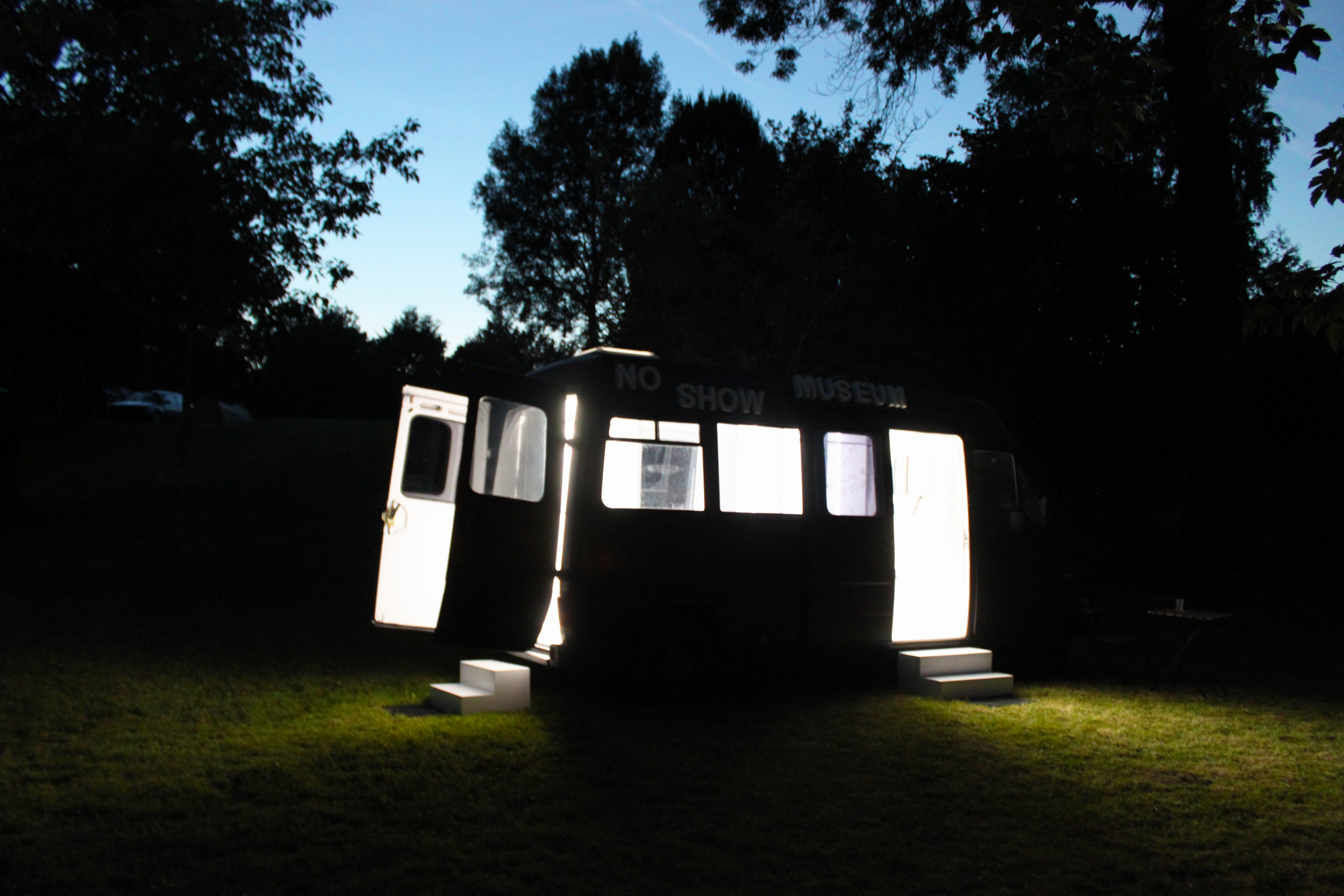
The mobile exhibition space of the No Show Museum. Mansbach, 2015

=== Thematic special exhibitions ===
The special exhibitions in the Mobile Museum each illuminate certain aspects, variants and themes of nothingness in art: INVISIBLE ARTWORKS (2015) presented 24 intangible and invisible works of conceptual art. The show NOTHING IS IMPOSSIBLE (2016) focused on works of art that do not exist and can not possibly exist (eg because it simply exceeds the possibilities of producing the artwork, or because trying to realize it leads to unsolvable conceptual and logical contradictions.) The special exhibition ¡NO FALTA NADA! (2017) was about the art of nothing as an absence, eg because the artwork has been lost or irrevocably destroyed, or because it has never existed. The special exhibition entitled NOTHING MATTERS - ICONS OF THE VOID (2018) was developed in collaboration with Slovak artist Stano Masar. On display in the mobile museum were 20 iconic works of art history from the beginning of the 20th century to the present day, which promote the dematerialization of art and in various ways illuminate the concept of nothingness.

== Nothing world tour ==
The No Show Museum committed itself to the mission to spread "nothing" in the World. For this reason, the museum was touring from 2015 to 2019 year after year from continent to continent. The first stage of the World Tour started in Zürich in July 2015 and led through 20 countries of Central and Northern Europe. It included around 30 exhibitions in museums and empty galleries in public spaces and remote areas. The tour ended in October 2015 with an exhibition and presentation of nothing in Venice where the No Show Museum was invited by Pro Helvetia's Salon Suisse as an official participant of the 56th Art Biennale. In the summer of 2016, the mobile museum was shipped from Europe to America with the mission to spread nothing in the New World: The 80-day exhibition tour led from New York to Canada, then to the West Coast of the U.S., and finally down to Baja California Sur, Mexico. The third stage took place from November 2017 to January 2018 and led from Baja California in Mexico through the countries of Central America (Guatemala, El Salvador, Honduras, Nicaragua, Costa Rica, Panama) to Colombia, with numerous exhibitions in public space and in collaboration with museums and local galleries. The fourth stage took place in October and November 2018 with exhibitions in France, Spain and Portugal, including a show at Museum of Art, Architecture and Technology in Lisbon.

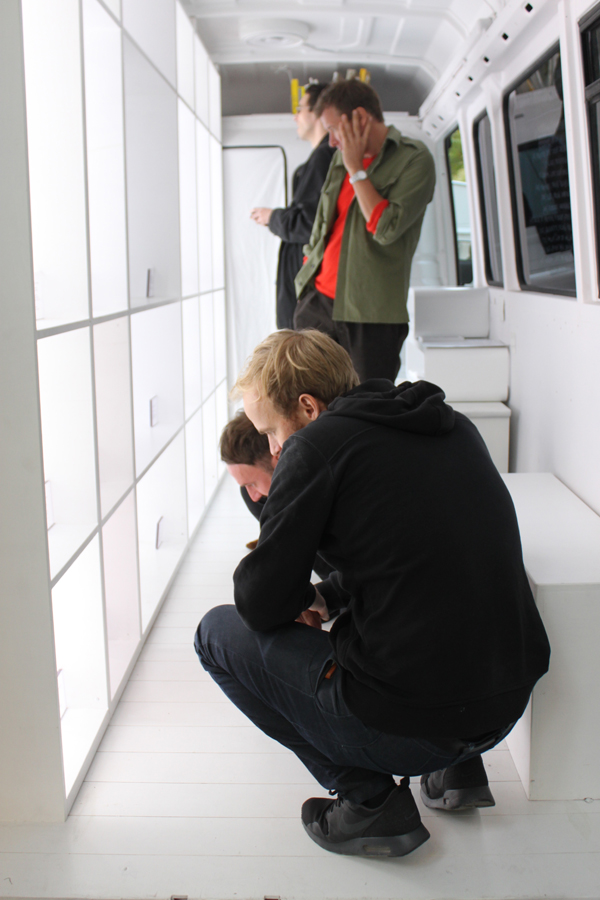
Thematic exhibition Invisible Artworks in the mobile museum. Budapest, 2015

== Conceptual background ==
=== Nothing as an aesthetic category ===
In the course of the 20th century, nothing has become as distinctive an aesthetic category as “the beautiful”, “the ugly” or "the absurd". The artistic examination of the (non) phenomenon "nothing" has led artists and critics to question the traditional practices of art production and open up new possibilities of spatial, temporal and material interpretation. Nothing is usually understood as the negation of being and figuration, but strictly speaking, it is impossible to define nothing. Every attempt to describe, represent or materialize nothing seems doomed to fail, and it is this very fact that has inspired many artists of the 20th century to work intensively with nothing and the paradoxes of its (re)presentation. The result is a large number of artistic strategies and works on nothing.

=== Nothing as a ready-made ===
Already in 1913, Marcel Duchamp demonstrated with his first ready-mades how any object can be converted into art by removing it from the sphere of ordinary life and placing it in a gallery or museum. This move from one context to another changes the way spectators view an object: in the context of art, it is no longer perceived as a mere object, but instead as placeholder of an idea or of an artistic intention. The result of such attributions is that the formerly ordinary object is transformed into a work of art. The same principle can be applied to nothing, and nothing can equally acquire “the dignity of a work of art by the mere choice of the artist” (André Breton). The No Show Museum is an attempt to create such an institutional framework for ensuring in the long run that nothing is art.

=== The museum as a mobile art context ===
Although the museum’s collection is virtual, the museum does have a physical space for presentations setup in a restored and customized post bus. Thus, the museum provides a moving art context that can either be attached to established institutions or function autonomously. Moreover, the mobile museum offers the opportunity to discover new regions and spaces for the contexts of nothing, and it serves as a marker to indicate any place as an exhibition area.
