= Fuck for the heir Puppy Bear! =

Political-artistic performance

Fuck for the Heir Puppy Bear! (Russian: Ебись за наследника Медвежонка, romanized: Yebis za naslednika Medvezhonka) was a political-artistic performance staged by Russian performance group Voina at the Timiryazev State Biological Museum in Moscow in February 2008. Among the participants, Nadya Tolokonnikova (singer of Pussy Riot) and her husband Pyotr Verzilov.

== Performance ==
On 23 February, as a prelude to the event, members of Voina showed up at a meeting of the Young Guard of United Russia and displayed a white banner with the slogan "Fuck for the Heir Puppy Bear".

On 28 February, almost twenty people assembled in the Moscow Biological Museum. Five couples undressed in the museum hall "Metabolism and Energy of Organisms", and engaged in sexual intercourse next to a glass taxidermy display case which contained a stuffed bear. Participants included Vera Kondakova (from Ukraine), Alexandre Karpenko (from Ukraine), as well as other well known Voina members. A video online shows a combination of men having sex with women from behind and oral sex performed on the men.

The performance was a protest of the election of Dmitry Medvedev in the 2008 Russian presidential election. It took place in front of a black flag with a slogan reading: "Fuck for the heir Puppy Bear!". The title "Puppy Bear" is a play on words referring to Medvedev, whose last name derives from the Russian word medved, "bear".

The Voina's performance was photographed and videotaped by several spectators invited by the group. It was also described and photographically illustrated online, by Russian lexicographer and blogger Alexei Plutser-Sarno, who himself participated in the action. Photos of the performance were also published by blogger adolfych. Following these blog reports, the action was covered by the media and met with mostly conservative responses in Russian society.

On March 3, Voina reappeared with the same slogan and marched with the banner "I fuck the Puppy Bear" at the Dissenters March in St. Petersburg.

== Performance goals ==
The performance was announced as a ritual for the bear totem. Plucer-Sarno explained the reason for the action was "We do not have a goal to necessarily be radical instigators. We have a goal to be honest artists and tell what we think. We think that the government fucks the people, and the people like this. This is why the action 'Fuck for the heir Puppy Bear' was born". He also said in the same interview that "This is a portrait of pre-election Russia: everybody fucks each other, and the puppy bear looks at that with an unconcealed scorn".

Plucer-Sarno published in his blog a commentary by artist Maria Perchikhina that described the performance as an "act of subversive affirmation". According to this opinion, the stuffed bear symbolizes the Russian political system, termed "imitation democracy" by Dmitry Furman, and turns into the figure of the "chosen chief bear". The goal of the action then, following the analogy of archaic fertility rituals, is birth assistance for the new political system. The ideas of fertility and reproduction along with the national idea form the core of the new political system. The single transgressive feature in the performance was the publicity of sexual activity. Perchikhina interpreted that transgressive feature as subversive affirmation, in other words, a resistance to the system by outperforming it (similar to "trying to be a better catholic than the Pope"). She also quoted an article by Inke Arns and Sylvia Sasse where the principle of subversive affirmation was explained.

Political science expert Ilya Prokudin commented that the action was clearly political: "The action in the Zoological museum had a political character. It was dedicated to the newly baked (we should not call him newly elected, who elected him?) puppy president, Medvedev, and mocked one of the 'national projects' curated by him, namely 'on the increase in birth rate'. For the least apprehensive, even a pregnant woman ('Nadezhda Tolokonnikova') was part of the scene."

== Response to performance ==
=== Faculty of Philosophy ===
One of the performers in phone interview with internet news agency Lenta.ru said that a student was expelled from the Faculty of Philosophy of MSU for participating in the action. However, the Dean of the Faculty, V.V. Mironov, stated that two or three students had been expelled long before the performance for poor grades. Mironov condemned such performances and claimed that the majority of MSU students share his negative opinion.

An unnamed organization gathered a collection of signatures under a document that condemned the performance. However, an alternative group collected signatures in favor of the performance.

=== Media response ===
==== Press and internet ====
Generally negative opinions of "Fuck for the heir Puppy Bear!" were published by the media. A number of publications focused on the amoral behavior of the performers. Newspaper Komsomolskaya Pravda commented: "They are not unrecognized geniuses. They are losers and poseurs acting on the principle: 'come, trash the place, go away'. For the PR, they would dance on a grave, and even take off their panties in public. And they do not care that after such actions innocent people suffer - metro employees, museum keepers. These actions of urban psychos stink very badly."

Mikhail Zhukhov, a lawyer from the attorney's collegium "Justice" commented that the performers' actions contained elements of crime described in Article 213, "Hooliganism", of Russian Criminal Code: "The action of the participants severely violated social order. Taking into account the place and the fact that people with photo-cameras and video-cameras were invited, a conclusion can be made about the existence or premeditation. All of this was done by a group of people by a prior arrangement. The participants might face harsh consequences - part 2 of article 213 of Russian Criminal Code makes a provision for a prison sentence for up to seven years. Museum staff should write a report to the Internal Affairs Department".

A representative of the foundation for effective politics, Pavel Danilin, called the performers pornographers and jerks and claimed that they had put shame on the Faculty and the University.

==== Radio and television ====
Russian poet Dmitry Volchek, who participated along with Alexei Plucer-Sarno in the Radio Liberty program devoted to the performance, claimed that the action had not been radical enough. He had also commented that the essence of conceptual art is in targeting the most vulnerable spot in the subconsciousness. In Volchek's opinion, that spot was accidentally hit by the action, making the stroke so painful.

Television covered the performance in several programs that described Voina's activities.

Videos of the action and of its media coverage can be found on the Internet.

== See also ==
- Fuck for Forest
- Guerrilla theatre
- Performance art
