= Andreas Heusser =

Swiss artist

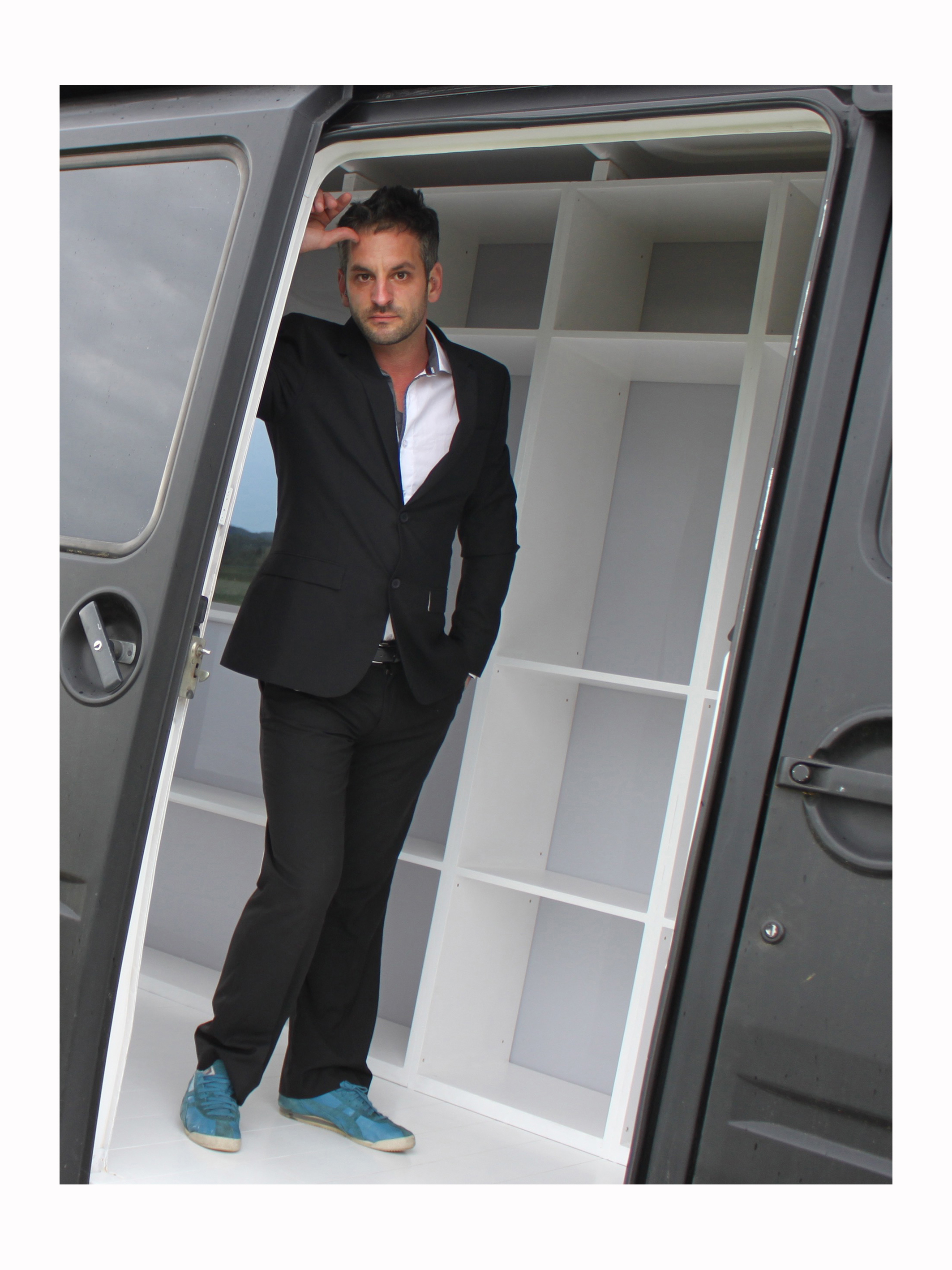
- Heusser in 2015
- Born: 1976 (age 49–50)
- Education: Philosophy, German literature
- Alma mater: University of Zurich
- Occupations: artist, art curator
- Years active: 2013 - present
- Website: www.andreasheusser.com

Andreas Heusser (born 1976) is a Swiss conceptual artist, cultural entrepreneur and curator based in Zurich and Johannesburg. He is the great-great-grandson of Johanna Spyri.

== Education ==
After completing an intermediate diploma in psychology in 2001, Andreas Heusser studied philosophy and German literature at the University of Zurich where he graduated with a master's degree in both subjects in 2003. Between 2011 and 2013, he attended the Bern University of Arts and attained a master's degree in contemporary arts practice (fine arts).

== Career ==
Heusser created the strategy game: Comploty, based on real-life conspiracy theories. It provides background informations and anecdotes about more than 100 current conspiracy myths. "Comploty – Brettspiel aus Verschwörungstheorien". SRF 1 (in German). 2023-12-20. The players slip into the role of the powerful elites who are working behind the scenes towards world domination. In addition to texts, graphics and illustrations, the implementation of the project also includes 3D design, videos, animations, web content, social media content, AI elements and diffusion strategies. The project breaks with the usual conditions of reception by presenting the artwork in the unusual form of a parlour game.

In 2013, Heusser developed the No Show Museum, a museum dedicated to the various manifestations of nothingness throughout the history of art. The museum has a mobile presentation space in a converted postal car. In 2015, the No Show Museum started a world tour. The first stage lasted from July to October 2015 through Europe, staging around 30 exhibitions in 20 different countries, before the museum arrived in Italy and participated at the 56th Venice Art Biennale. In the summer of 2016, the mobile museum was shipped from Europe to America, where an 80-day exhibition tour led from New York to Canada, then to the West Coast of the U.S., and finally to Baja California Sur, Mexico. The third stage of the world tour took place from 2017 to 2018 and led from Mexico through the countries of Central America to Colombia. The fourth stage took place in 2018 through Western Europe with exhibitions in France, Spain, and Portugal, including a show at the Museum of Art, Architecture and Technology (MAAT) in Lisbon.

=== Political art projects ===
As an artist, Heusser first became known for a series of satirical long-term projects that attempt to bridge the gap between art and activism, among them:

- War Development Aid (KEH, launched in 2009 with Nüssli/Oeschger), aimed to expose the hypocrisies of politicians who subordinate their Christian and humanitarian principles to the interests of the arms industry.
- Organization to Solve the Foreigner Question (OLAF, launched in 2010 with Nüssli/Oeschger), was conceived as counterpropaganda to the xenophobic campaign of the Swiss right-wing party (SVP), which demanded to expel all criminal foreigners. OLAF pretended to be a close ally and partner organization of the SVP, but actually parodied them.
- Christian Humanitarian Asylum Self-Aid Organization Switzerland (CHASOS, 2011) was a satirical reaction on how media and politicians reinforced xenophobic prejudices by evoking the dystopia of gigantic waves of refugees after the Arab Spring.

All three were fictional organizations which imitated and parodied real institutions. The projects mainly took place outside of art institutions, and involved counterfeiting websites, propaganda videos, press releases, social media posts, and other forms of dissemination. Tactics like provocation, public interventions, and hoaxes were used to create controversy and generate media coverage in dominant media outlets. Despite the satiric content, the fake organizations and fictitious characters were often mistaken as legitimate.

=== Curatorial works ===
- Zurich Literature Festival: Heusser is the founder and director of the Literaturfestival Zürich (formerly: Openair Literatur Festival Zürich), an week-long literary festival which has taken place annually since 2013. The festival is jointly presented by Kaufleuten and Literaturhaus Zurich.
- The Institute: Heusser is a founding member and co-director of The Institute, a project space for performing and transdisciplinary arts in Zurich. Several artists' collectives from different artistic fields (film, music, dance, literature, performance) are involved and contribute with weekly events and performances to the public programme of the venue which also includes research and workshops.
- index freiraum Artist Residency: Heusser is also the founder and an organizing member of the international artist residency program 'index freiraum', established in 2010. The program offers international artists from various disciplines a free residential stay in Zurich as well as opportunities for networking and public presentation.
- Kaufleuten: Between 2011 and 2013, Heusser was the program director of the cultural venue "Kaufleuten" where he was responsible for the curation and implementation of around 200 cultural events per year, including concerts by international artists and bands, readings, podiums and cabaret events.
- Series and festivals: In 2001, Heusser and Marc Rychener founded the interdisciplinary artist collective index based in Zurich. With index, he organized a number of concert series, performances and festivals (e.g. "Festival der Künste" 2002, "Lyrik am Fluss" 2002–2005).

== Selected solo exhibitions ==
- Museum Strauhof, Zürich, Switzerland, 02/2025
- Valie Export Center, Linz, Austria, 10/2019
- Museum of Art, Architecture and Technology (MAAT) in Lisbon, Portugal, 11/2018
- Galería El Sótano, Guatemala City, Guatemala, 11/2017
- Ice Cube Gallery, Denver, Colorado, USA, 09/2016
- Fort Gondo, St. Louis, Missouri, USA, 09/2016
- Scrap Metal Gallery, Toronto, Canada, 09/2016
- 56. Biennale di Venezia, Salon Suisse / Palazzo Trevisan and Lido, Venice, Italy, 10/2015
- Chimera-Project Gallery, Budapest, Hungary, 10/2015
- #Poligon Art Space, Warsaw, Poland, 09/2015
- Grimmuseum, Berlin, Germany, 08/2015
- Museum Strauhof, Zürich, Switzerland, 07/2015

== Select group exhibitions ==
- "Ours Is Not The Only Planet Earth Has Been", Ballroom Projects, Chicago, 10/2016
- Survival K(n)it Festival 7, Latvian Centre for Contemporary Art, Riga, Latvia, 09/2015
- Kling-Festival, Mansbach, Germany, 08/2015
- Kabinett der Visionäre, Chur, Switzerland, 06/2015
- Doing Nothing Festival, Dock 18, Rote Fabrik, Zürich, Switzerland, 5/2015
- "Show Me Show Me Show Me", Centre PasqArt, Biel, Switzerland, 6/2013
- Werkpreis Kanton Zürich, F+F Schule, Zürich, Switzerland, 10/2011

== Awards and grants ==
- 2019 City of Zurich Art Award for No Show Museum - From Dada to Nada

== Trivia ==
Heusser is a descendant of Swiss author Johanna Spyri (née Johanne Louise Heusser), best known for the classic children’s novel Heidi.

== See also ==
- Literaturfestival Zürich
