= Uchronia (film) =

2026 film

- Poster
- Directed by: Fil Ieropoulos
- Written by: Foivos Dousos
- Based on: A Season in Hell by Arthur Rimbaud
- Produced by: Spyros Patsouras; Fil Ieropoulos
- Starring: Kristof
- Cinematography: Yorgos Koutsaliaris
- Edited by: Fil Ieropoulos
- Music by: Nefeli Bravaki; Niki Bravaki
- Production companies: FYTA Films; Grom Productions
- Distributed by: Arsenal Institute for Film and Video Art
- Release date: 2026
- Running time: 97 minutes

Uchronia is 2026 film directed, edited and co-produced by Fil Ieropoulos, written by Foivos Dousos.

It is inspired by Arthur Rimbaud's Une Saison en Enfer and follows the ghost of Rimbaud as he travels through time meeting queer, revolutionary figures from across the 20th century including Emma Goldman, Marsha P. Johnson and David Wojnarowicz.

The films's executive producers include Charlie Kaufman. It premiered in the Forum Expanded section of the 76th Berlin International Film Festival on 17 February 2026. It won the Wild Dreamer Award for Best Documentary at the Subversive Festival.

After release it also screened at the 40th BFI Flare. in London, Subversive Festival in Zagreb, Wicked Queer in Boston, Prismatic Ground in New York and MIX México.

== Critical reception ==
The film was reviewed by circuit critics following the Berlinale premier. Nick Cunningham, at the documentary trade publication Business Doc Europe, said it was a work of "glorious excess". Cerise Howard said it was "a tirelessly playful film existing outside of conventional realms of genre" and read it as a militantly queer call to honour queer revolutionaries. In the American art magazine The Arts Fuse, Peter Keough said using the chapter headings of Rimbaud's poetic cycle A Season in Hell as the framework resulted in "a tour de force that deserves to be seen, probably more than once".
