= Literaturfestival Zürich =

Annual literary festival in Switzerland

- Status: Active
- Genre: Literary festival
- Locations: Zürich, Switzerland
- Founder: Andreas Heusser
- Website: Official Website

Literaturfestival Zürich (alternative spelling: Zürich Literature Festival, formerly: Openair Literatur Festival Zürich) is an annual week-long international literary festival in Zürich. It enjoys a reputation as one of the "best literary festivals in the world". The main stage of the festival is located in the midst of the sprawling nature of the Old Botanical Garden in Zürich. The Festival is jointly presented by Literaturhaus Zürich and Kaufleuten, the two major institutions for literary events in Zürich. Founder and director of the festival is Swiss conceptual artist and curator Andreas Heusser who is curating the program together with the management team of Kaufleuten and Literaturhaus Zurich. Since 2021, the festival has been held in a hybrid format, with all events streamed live as well. The festival has its own film and streaming team that produces the events in broadcast quality, using multiple camera angles and live editing.

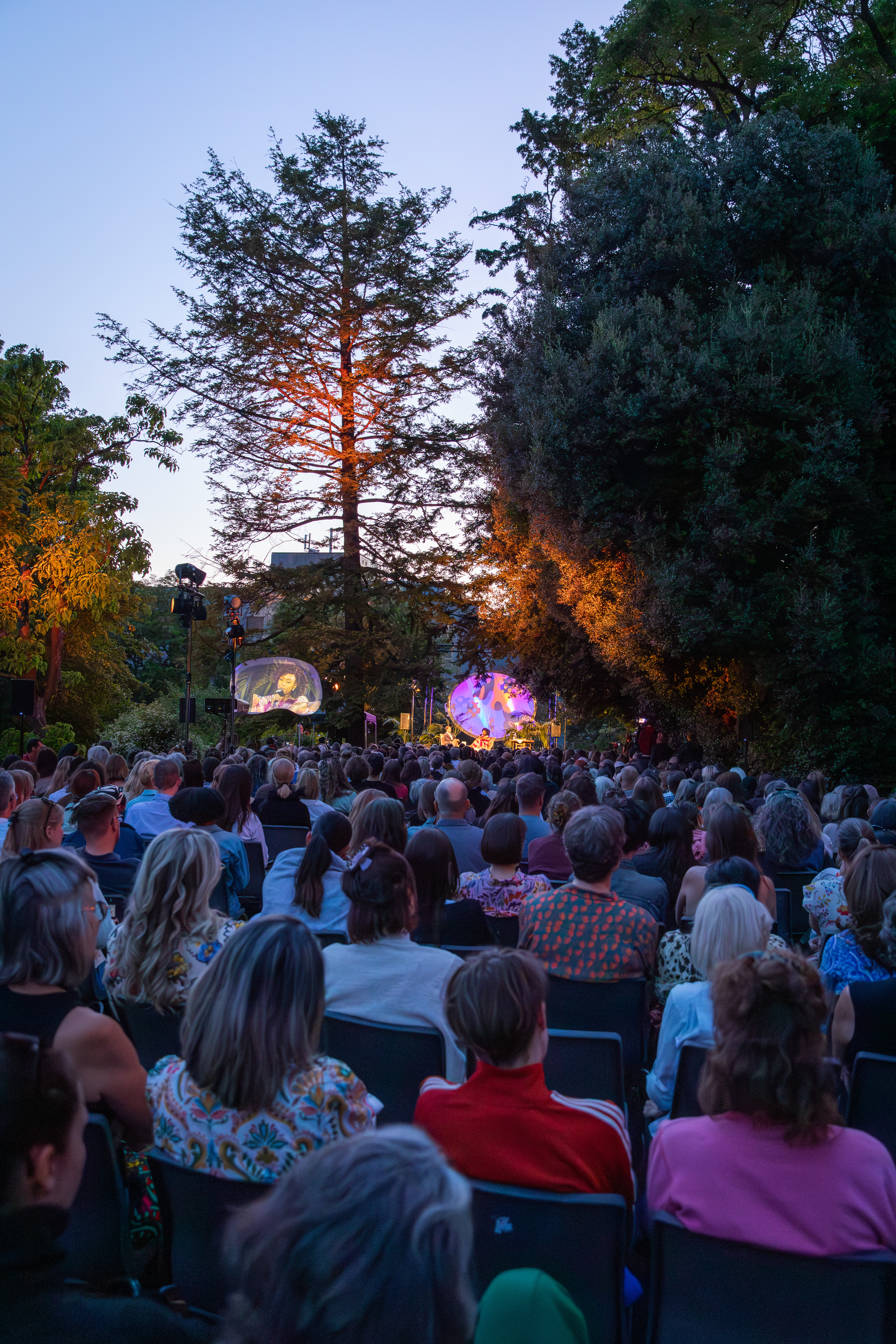
Open-air stage of the Zurich Literature Festival in the Old Botanical Garden, 2025

The main program of the festival consists of premieres, performances and readings by international authors. Many world-famous writers have appeared at the festival in recent years, including John Coetzee, Zadie Smith, Chimamanda Ngozi Adichie, Francis Fukuyama, Anne Enright, Bernardine Evaristo, David Grossman, Julian Barnes, Roxane Gay, John Cleese, Leïla Slimani, Junot Díaz, Connie Palmen, David Mitchell, Rebecca Solnit, John Banville, Tsitsi Dangarembga, Marlon James, Paul Lynch (writer), Xiaolu Guo, Peter Sloterdijk, Deborah Levy, Hua Hsu, Helen Macdonald, Teju Cole, Deborah Feldman.

The format "Words on Stage - Best of Spoken Word" has also established itself as a permanent feature of the program and closing event of the festival. Part of the festival’s curatorial signature is its interdisciplinary approach. While in its early years this included collaborations with other genres – such as poetic installations, interactive radio plays, singer/songwriter concerts, or performances combining text, dance, and theatre – the current focus lies on a distinctive scenographic concept. Readings are staged in immersive settings where live-stream recordings are embedded as projections within the scenography, creating a spatial dialogue between literature and nature, as well as between physical presence and digital mediation. The aim is to create a "poetic overall experience" that involves all the senses. That is why the festival is often called "Switzerland's most beautiful literary festival".

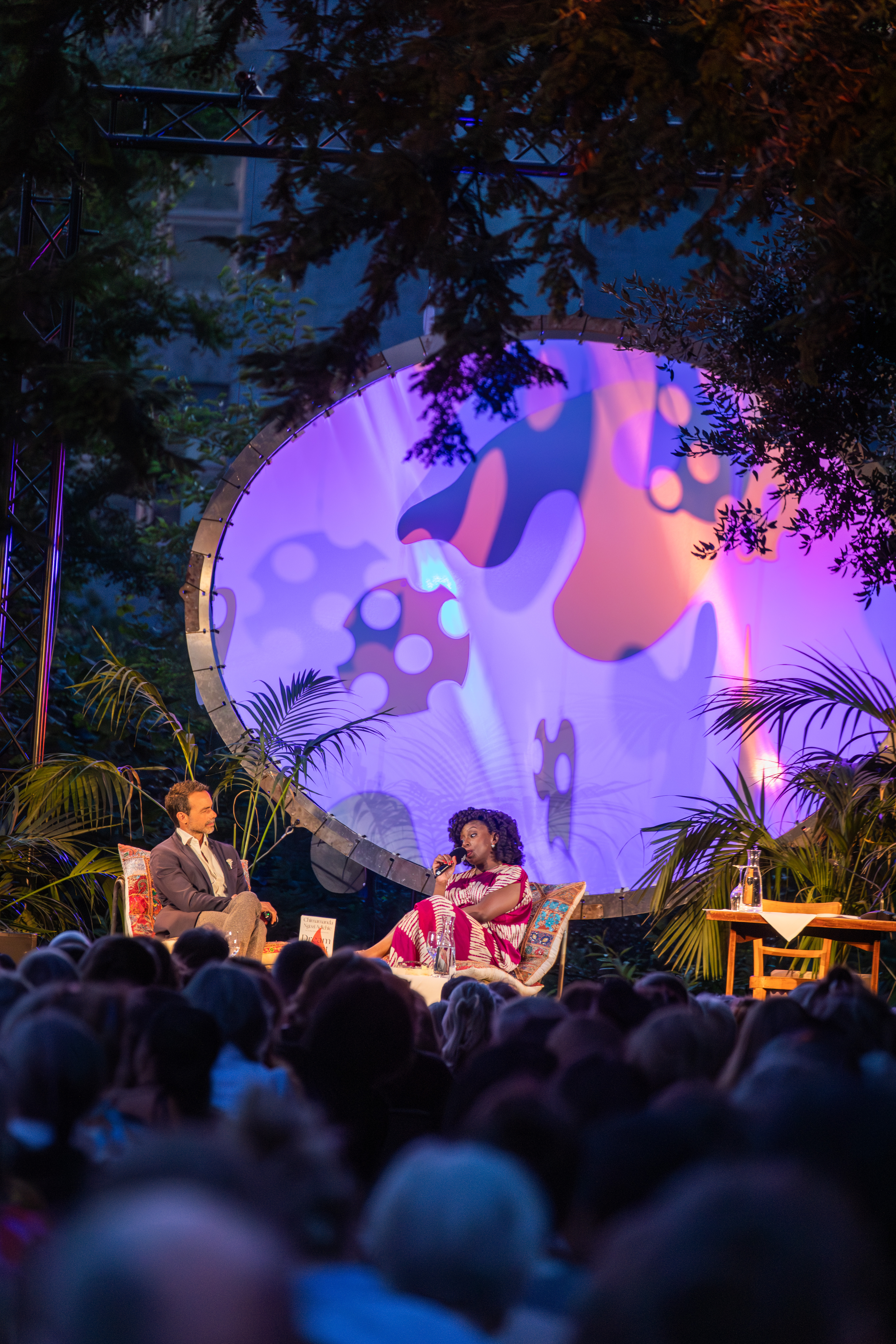
Reading and conversation with Chimamanda Ngozi Adichie, 2025
