= Voina =

Russian political street-art group

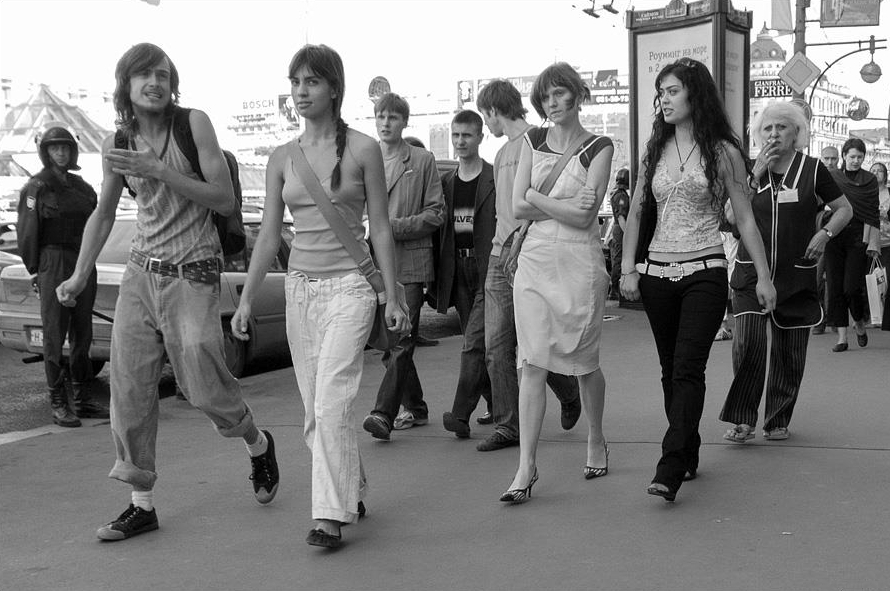
- Members of Voina at the Dissenters' March, 2007
- Years active: 2007-2024
- Location: Moscow, Russia
- Major figures: Natalia Sokol; Nadya Tolokonnikova; Pyotr Verzilov
- Influenced: Pussy Riot

Voina (Russian: Война, IPA: [vɐjˈna] , lit. 'War') is a Russian art collective known for their provocative and politically charged works of performance art. The group has had more than sixty members, including former and current students of the Rodchenko Moscow School of Photography, Moscow State University, and University of Tartu. However, the group does not cooperate with state or private institutions, and is not supported by any Russian curators or gallerists.

The activities of Voina have ranged from street protest, symbolic pranks in public places, and performance-art happenings, to vandalism and destruction of public property. More than a dozen criminal cases have been brought against the group. On 7 April 2011 the group was awarded the "Innovation" prize in the category "Work of Visual Art", established by the Russian Ministry of Culture.

== Origins ==
Oleg Vorotnikov, a philosophy graduate from Moscow State University (MSU), is generally considered to be the founder of Voina. Activist Anton Kotenev goes so far as to say that "Voina is Vorotnikov". In 2005, Vorotnikov and Natalia Sokol, then a physics student at MSU, created the art group "Sokoleg", which focused mainly on large-scale photography. In the spring of 2006, they met with Anton Nikolaev, leader of the art group "Bombily", with whom they began to collaborate. (Bombila is Russian slang for an unlicensed taxi driver, usually of Caucasian origin, who drives a "bomb"). The combined group was based at the studio of performance artist Oleg Kulik. In early 2007, the more radical and politically minded members of the project created Voina, led by Vorotnikov, also known as Vor ("Thief"), and his wife Natalia Sokol, also known as Kozol, Koza or Kozlyonok ("Little She-Goat"). It was founded on a radical left agenda "because the left spectrum is generally absent in Russian art".

Other key members include Leonid Nikolayev (Lyonya Yobnuty, "Crazy Lenya" or "Leo the Fucknut") and Alexei Plutser-Sarno (Plut, "Crook"), chief author of the group's media art and texts.

Voina members were students of philosophy with anarchist politics. The collective had no income, philosophically rejected salaried employment and the use of money. Its members lived a DIY scavenging ethic and putatively "made the lifting of food and drink from supermarkets ...a form of art."

Nadezhda Tolokonnikova and her husband Pyotr Verzilov were members of Voina since its early stages, and lived with the group as squatters in an automobile garage. However, they split from the original group in acrimonious circumstances in late 2009, forming their own group. Tolokonnikova was later jailed for her role in the Pussy Riot "punk prayer" at Moscow's Cathedral of Christ the Saviour.

In late February 2011, activists Oleg Vorotnikov and Leonid Nikolayev were released on bail after four months in Moscow police custody, in connection with an anti-corruption protest. They faced up to seven years of prison. In response to the detention, graffiti artist Banksy helped to raise money for the artists. They have also been denounced by right-wing groups such as the "People's Synod".

== Early activity ==
=== Mordovian Hour ===
On 1 May 2007, Voina staged a celebration of International Workers' Day, entitled Mordovian Hour, by throwing live cats over the counters at the McDonald's restaurant at Serpukhovskaya, Moscow, "to break up the drudgery of workers' routine day". This was a combined project with the Bombily art group. The action was witnessed by two plain-clothes police, who arrested Pyotr Verzilov and kept two cats as evidence. Charges against Verzilov were eventually dropped.

=== Feast ===
On 24 August 2007, Voina conducted a wake for absurdist poet Dmitry Prigov, featuring a table with food and vodka, in a Moscow Metro car. Originally, they had planned an action involving Prigov but he died before they were able to implement it. They later carried out a similar action on the Kyiv Metro.

=== Fuck for the heir Puppy Bear! ===
Voina came to widespread public attention with Fuck for the heir Puppy Bear!, staged on 29 February 2008, the day before the election of Russian President Dmitry Medvedev. Five couples had public sex in Moscow's Timiryazev State Museum of Biology. Two of the performers were Vera Kondakova and Alexandre Karpenko. While there were no immediate legal repercussions, several participants faced disciplinary action by the philosophy department of Moscow University.

Alexei Plutser-Sarno, a linguist and author of a dictionary of Russian Mat (profanity) participated in this action in a minor capacity, and wrote about it in a detailed if somewhat fanciful blog post. Although he criticised the action for its lack of originality (similar actions had previously been staged by other Russian performance art groups), he was soon accepted as a full member of Voina, becoming their chief "media officer" and documenting the group's activities on his blog.

=== Humiliation of a Cop in his House ===
On 6 May 2008 Voina activists, entered a small police station in Bolshevo near Moscow. They hung a portrait of Dmitri Medvedev on the prison bars, and hung posters with phrases such as "Kill the immigrants" and "Abandon hope all ye who enter here". They then formed a human pyramid, and recited Prigov poems.

=== Cop in a Priest's Cassock ===
On 3 July 2008 Oleg Vorotnikov wore the robe of a Russian Orthodox priest and the hat of a police officer, entered a supermarket, then left without paying for a full cart of groceries, to demonstrate the "invulnerability" of these groups.

=== In Memory of the Decembrists ===
On 7 September 2008, to protest homophobic and racist comments by Moscow Mayor Yuri Luzhkov, Voina staged a mock-hanging of two homosexual men and three Central Asian guest workers in a department store in Moscow. The title of the piece references the Decembrist revolt, an 1825 military uprising against Emperor Nicholas I of Russia. Some members of the group held a sign saying "Nobody gives a fuck about Pestel", a reference to the executed Decembrist leader Pavel Pestel.

Later, in 2012, Putin used this action in his response to Angela Merkel's criticism on the Pussy Riot case. He accused the participants of "anti-Semitism" and claimed that they "said that we need to get rid of such people in Moscow". Writing at the Echo of Moscow website, gay activist Oleg Vasilyev identified himself as the Jewish man who was mock-executed. He flatly rejected Putin's version of events, saying that "practically everything about this statement is untrue". He also said that Jews were not even mentioned during the action itself, only in Plutser-Sarno's blog post, Plutser-Sarno himself being Jewish.

=== The Storming of the White House ===
On the night of 6–7 November 2008, Voina gained access to a room in the attic of the Hotel Ukraina, across from the Russian White House building, seat of the Government of the Russian Federation. Using subterfuge, they brought an enormous laser projector into the hotel. They became trapped with the projector in an elevator, but broke through the ceiling, and disabled its door mechanism. The equipment was used to project a skull and crossbones, 12 stories tall, onto the facade of the White House building. Meanwhile, other activists staged a "storming" of the building, by scaling the 8-meter iron gates in front of it.

=== The Banning of the Clubs ===
On 28 December 2008, members of Voina welded shut the entrance doors of the restaurant Oprichnik, using an acetylene torch and metal sheets. A message was left at the scene: "For the security of our citizens, the doors of the elite club Oprichnik have been reinforced".

=== Dick in the Ass – Punk Concert in the Courtroom ===
In May 2009, Voina members interrupted a courtroom hearing for the director of the Andrei Sakharov Museum and Public Center, which was being held in Moscow. They billed themselves as a punk band called "Dick in the Ass" and performed a song, "All Cops are Bаstards, Remember This", using instruments and a small amplifier which they had smuggled into the courtroom. The performance lasted less than two minutes as they were soon removed by security forces.

== Split ==
A schism of the Voina collective into two groups occurred in connection with a performance-art action in November 2009. Tolokonnikova and Verzilov went to Kyiv, Ukraine, to assist in a performance by Ukrainian artist-activist Alexander Volodarsky.

At the Verkhovna Rada building, house of the Ukrainian Parliament, Volodarsky and his girlfriend were arrested for stripping naked and simulating public sex. As a result, Volodarsky served six weeks in police detention, and a six-month sentence in a penal colony.

According to other members, the reason for the split of Voina into two factions was that Tolokonnikova and Verzilov had turned police informant against Volodarsky, then had stolen Volodarsky's personal items, laptop computer, and money, while he was in detention. Several years later, Volodarsky said the sex performance in Kyiv was a botched operation, rather than a betrayal, and described himself as "a bargaining chip in a factional conflict". However, the original Voina group also contend that Verzilov later stole hard disk drives, photographs, and other materials from them, for the purpose of self-promotion.

In December 2009, Tolokonnikova and Verzilov were expelled and moved elsewhere, to re-organize a separate group. The conflict later led to controversy over which faction should take credit for various artworks created under the name "Voina".

Verzilov has continued to use the name "Voina" despite the objections of Vorotnikov and other Voina members. His group is sometimes referred to as the "Moscow faction" of Voina, however Vorotnikov rejects this terminology, and continues to allege that Verzilov is a police provocateur. Verzilov considers himself to be a co-founder of Voina, and therefore entitled to continue to use the name. He rejects the allegations that he is a police informant but offers no further explanation.

== Activities of the original members since 2009 ==
=== Dick Captured by the FSB ===
During the night of 14 June 2010, Voina painted a giant 65 m long phallus on the surface of the Liteyny drawbridge leading to the Bolshoy Dom, headquarters of the Federal Security Service in Saint Petersburg. This painting was entitled Giant Galactic Space Penis. The group studied traffic patterns at the bridge, and practiced coordinated actions for two weeks beforehand, in a parking lot, because they would have only 30 seconds to complete the painting before the drawbridge was raised.

=== How to Snatch a Chicken ===
On 20 July 2010, Voina staged one of their more notorious actions in the Nakhodka supermarket in St. Petersburg. A female Voina activist nicknamed "Vacuous Cunt With Inconceivably Huge Tits" removed a chicken from the refrigerated section of the supermarket, then laboriously stuffed the entire chicken into her own vagina, while being filmed by other Voina members. She then shoplifted the chicken by leaving the supermarket without paying, with the chicken still inserted, and rejoined activists outside the store. The activists held signs spelling out the word "bezblyadno", which translates roughly as "without whoring", a reference to the group's rejection of paid employment and preference for stealing food, and a pun on the word besplatno, "free (of charge)". (This stunt has sometimes been incorrectly attributed to Pussy Riot).

=== Palace Coup ===
On 20 September 2010, members of Voina overturned a police car by rocking it from side to side, on the pretext of retrieving a football for Vorotnikov and Sokol's son Kasper.

=== Cops Auto-da-fe, or Fucking Prometheus ===
On 31 December 2011, Voina broke into a police station in St. Petersburg and set a police car on fire using molotov cocktails.

== Activities of the Moscow faction since 2009 ==
=== Cockroach Court ===
On 12 July 2010, Yuri Samodurov and Andrei Erofeev, curators of the exhibition "Forbidden Art 2006", were being sentenced in the Tagansky Courthouse, Moscow, on charges of "inciting religious hatred". The conservative Orthodox group "People's Synod" had objected to exhibits which depicted Mickey Mouse and Lenin as Jesus Christ.

Members of Voina entered the court building, intending to release approximately 3500 live Madagascan giant cockroaches. It is not clear to what extent they succeeded. The process of raising and collecting the roaches is documented, but no photographic evidence from inside the courthouse has been released. Activist Yekaterina Samutsevich, among those who planned to infiltrate the court with insects, was later prosecuted in the same courtroom, before being sentenced to probation in the Pussy Riot trial.

=== Operation: Kiss Garbage ===
In January and February 2011, Voina enacted a series of provocations in Moscow public areas, entitled Operation: Kiss Garbage (Russian: "Лобзай мусора", roughly translated as "Kiss a Pig"). In Russian, the word musor (literally: 'garbage') is derogatory slang for "police officer", similar to the English "pig". The action consisted of female activists approaching and kissing policewomen without warning or consent; took place in the subway stations and on the streets. It was done as an anticipatory protest of the New Law on Police signed by President Medvedev, which went into effect on 1 March 2011.

=== Pussy Riot ===
The group Pussy Riot was formed in August 2011, and included Nadezhda Tolokonnikova, Pyotr Verzilov, and Yekaterina Samutsevich, members of the Moscow faction of Voina.

== Aftermath of split ==
On 15 November 2010, Leonid Nikolayev and Oleg Vorotnikov were arrested for overturning seven empty police cars as an art performance act, Palace Revolution. The official charges were violations of Article 213, Paragraph 1, Item B of the Criminal Code – hooliganism motivated by hatred or hostility towards a social group. No bail was allowed, and the trial was set for 28 February 2011. When bailed out from prison in late February 2011, Vorotnikov skipped on his bail and went into hiding.

On 31 March 2011, Vorotnikov was arrested again in an unrelated incident, for assaulting a police officer at an unsanctioned political rally. Activists aligned with the group Strategy-31 were demonstrating in favor of proper enforcement of Article 31 of the Russian constitution, which guarantees the right to peaceful assembly. The demonstration turned into an ugly confrontation, after activists doused police officers with bottles containing their own urine. Vorotnikov was detained and released. However, an international warrant was later issued for his re-arrest, in July 2011.

Nikolayev, Vorotnikov, and a third Voina member, Natalya Sokol, allege to have been attacked by plainclothes members of the anti-extremism police in St. Petersburg. The beating followed a press conference where Voina discussed the conditions of their detention. They have been living as fugitives in the St. Petersburg area, and have attempted to evade police by frequently changing location.

On 7 April 2011 the group was awarded the "Innovation" prize in the category "Work of Visual Art", established by the Ministry of Culture. The award was given for the phallus on Foundry Bridge in St. Petersburg, drawn on the night of 15 June 2010. When the bridge opened the 65-meter long penis faced the St. Petersburg FSB (former KGB headquarters). The prize was 400,000 roubles (approx €10,000).

The participants of the art group did not attend the prize giving. Leonid Nikolayev and Oleg Vorotnikov explained this action by the fact that their work does not require formal approval.

On 1 July 2011, it became known they gave the 400,000 rubles state award "Innovation" as a gift to the human rights organisation Agora to help political prisoners.

Some time in late 2012 or early 2013, Vorotnikov, Sokol and their two children fled Russia for Italy, despite their outstanding Interpol arrest warrant. On 10 January 2013 a video was uploaded to YouTube showing Vorotnikov apparently giving a lecture at Sale, an independent art gallery based in a disused salt warehouse in Venice.

On 24 September 2015, prominent member Leonid Nikolaev died after a fall while pruning trees.

In September 2016 Oleg Vorotnikov stated (while he and his wife Natalia Sokol were seeking asylum in Czech Republic) that he had become a supporter of President Vladimir Putin and his policies and entourage. He claimed he had a change of heart after he had concluded that the leaders of the 2011–13 anti-Putin demonstrations "should not be allowed anywhere near politics".
