= Disnovation.org =

Contemporary artists

- Known for: Contemporary Art
- Notable work: Predictive Art Bot (2015-2017), Online Culture Wars (2018-2019), Shanzhai Archeology (2015-2018), The Pirate Cinema (2012-2014)
- Website: disnovation.org

Disnovation.org (sometimes referred to as the disnovation.org working group) is a contemporary art duo of Maria Roszkowska and Nicolas Maigret based in Paris, France, that develops installations, publications and events about technology and politics.

Their work has been presented at Centre Pompidou, Transmediale, Museum of Art and Design and the Science Gallery, Dublin.

== Selected works ==
=== The Pirate Cinema ===
The Pirate Cinema (2012-2014) is a video installation that uses a computer that constantly downloads the 100 most viewed torrents on a tracker website, intercepts the currently downloading video/audio snippets, projects them on the screen with the information on their origin and destination, discards them and repeats the process with the next stream in the download que.

=== Predictive Art Bot ===
Predictive Art Bot (2015-2017) is an algorithm for predicting artistic concepts.

== Publications ==
The Pirate Book (2015) A compilation of stories about sharing, distributing and experiencing cultural contents outside the boundaries of local economies, politics, or laws.
