= Zak Kostopoulos =

Greek LGBT activist (1985–2018)

- Ζακ Κωστόπουλος
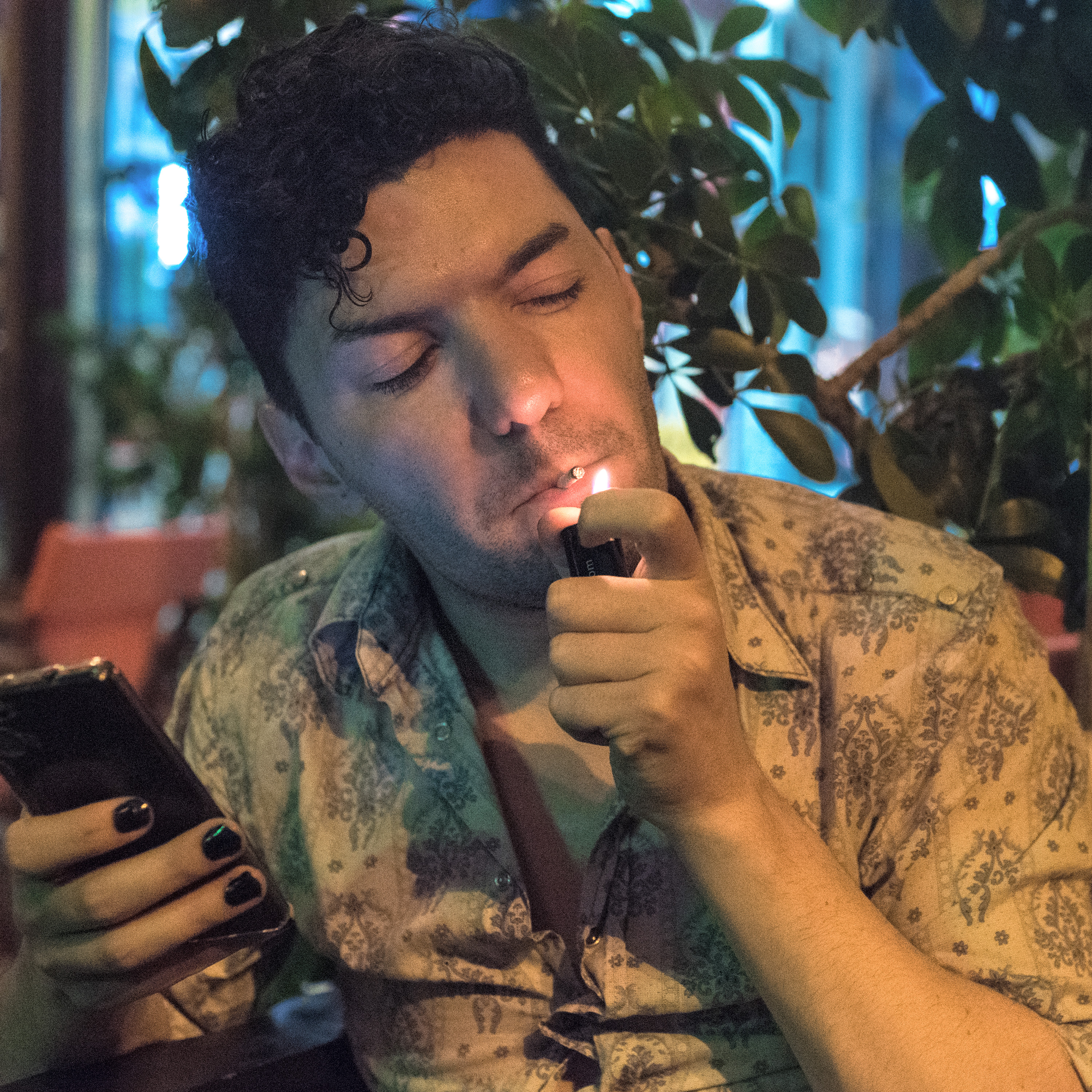
- Zak Kostopoulos in Exarchia, Athens in 2017
- Born: Zacharias Kostopoulos; 22 August 1985; United States of America
- Died: 21 September 2018 (aged 33); Omonoia, Athens, Greece
- Other name: Zackie Oh
- Occupations: LGBT activist, columnist, drag performer

Zacharias "Zak" Kostopoulos (Greek: Ζαχαρίας «Ζακ» Κωστόπουλος; 22 August 1985 – 21 September 2018) was a Greek-American activist, defending the rights of LGBT people, HIV-positive people, sex workers, and refugees. He worked as a drag performer under the stage name Zackie Oh. He was killed on a busy street near Omonoia Square, Athens in broad daylight on 21 September 2018. First beaten by civilians and later by the police, he died while on the way to the hospital. Two men were found guilty of his murder.

== Family life and career ==
Kostopoulos was born in the United States of America in 1985 to a Greek immigrant family. The family returned to Greece when he was seven. Kostopoulos went abroad again as a young man, and eventually returned to Greece. He studied acting and marketing in school.

In the municipal elections of 2014, Kostopoulos stood for election to the Athens municipal council on the electoral list Π.Ν.ΟΙΚ.Α ('Initiative for a New and Ecological Athens', Πρωτοβουλία για μια Νέα και Οικολογική Αθήνα), but lost. He was also HIV positive.

=== Activist work ===
Kostopoulos worked at the "Athens Check Point", and volunteered with the Positive Voice—an association of HIV-positive people of Greece—writing articles on the internet and for newspapers. He was the president of the Homosexual and Lesbian Community of Greece (OLKE) organization. Kostopoulos participated in drag performances in Athens under the alias, "Zackie Oh". In 2017, he performed Disco Inferno at Athens Pride.

== Death ==
Kostopoulos was killed on 21 September 2018 at Gladstonos Street in the center of Athens, and was buried in the town of Kirra where he grew up.

It is unknown how Kostopoulos entered the jewelry shop on Gladstonos street where his killing began. Another Greek LGBT activist, Grigoris Vallianatos, said that he entered the shop to escape an altercation on the street. Videos of the killing show Kostopoulos unarmed and trying to escape from the store as he is being attacked by the store's owner and another man, a real estate agent who was a high-ranking member of the National Front. After a window was broken by the owner, Kostopoulos crawled out, was kicked in the head, and fell to the ground. When police arrived at the scene, despite his injuries, Kostopoulos was apprehended and handcuffed. They also beat him, and he died on the way to the hospital. An eyewitness, Philippos Karagiorgis, described the killing as a "lynching" and criticized onlookers for "...watching as if it was a movie..." instead of intervening.

The police did not immediately arrest the perpetrators of the killing, interview all the witnesses present, or seal off the crime scene. Initial Greek media reports said that Kostopoulos was a drug addict who was committing a robbery of the jewelry shop. A forensic analysis, however, found no traces of drugs in his system. The coroner found that he had died of multiple injuries, especially to his head. Kostopoulos' family commissioned the UK-based research center Forensic Architecture to investigate his death. Forensic Architecture found that the police had overlooked twelve cameras that were recording the scene and failed to question a key witness who appeared in the footage. As a result of the Forensic Architecture investigation, the case was reopened in 2019.

Six people, including four police officers, the shop owner, and another man who was filmed beating Kostopoulos, were charged with inflicting "fatal bodily harm" causing death. Kostopoulos' family wanted his death to be tried as murder. The trial, that presiding judge Giorgos Kassimis described as "historic", was originally scheduled for October 2020, but was delayed due to the effect of the COVID-19 pandemic in Greece. Finally, the trial began 21 October 2021. On 3 May 2022, two men were found guilty, while the police officers were found innocent.

== Legacy ==
In 2018, 2019, and 2021 activists organized marches in Athens to commemorate Kostopoulos' death and call for justice against his killers. The slogan "Zackie lives, smash the Nazis" (Note: Greek: Η Ζάκι ζει, τσακίστε τους Ναζί (I Záki zei, tsakíste tous Nazí)) was chanted at events across the country.

In 2019, Nasos Iliopoulos, who is the leader of the Syriza faction inside the Municipal Council of Athens, proposed the renaming of Gladstonos street (Greek: οδός Γλάδστωνος) to Zak Kostopoulos street (Greek: οδός Ζακ Κωστόπουλου). The Mayor of Athens, Kostas Bakoyannis, responded with a counter-proposal to create a monument against intolerance, racism, and hatred, that the majority voted in favor of.

In 2021, a researcher at Aristotle University of Thessaloniki named a newly discovered species of cyanobacteria, the Iphianassa zackieohae, after Kostopoulos.
