= Subversive affirmation =

Type of artistic performance

Subversive affirmation is an artistic performance that overemphasizes prevailing ideologies and thereby calls them into question. Simultaneously with affirmation, the affirmed concepts are revealed, and artists distance themselves from those concepts. Strategies of subversive affirmation include "over-identification", "over-affirmation" and "yes revolution".

== Overview ==
According to Inke Arns and Sylvia Sasse the methods of subversive affirmation have been developing in Eastern European art since the 1960s. Subversive affirmation was initially chosen because of the necessity to conform to socialist ideology, which is then adopted deliberately. In the late 80s these tactics were carried over to Western art and activism. The term "affirmation" was introduced by Moscow conceptualists to describe Vladimir Sorokin's novels. Sorokin exaggerated serious realism in the style of the 19th-century novel or in the style of socialist realism. Subversive affirmation is not a form of reverse psychology, in part, because it involves mimesis, but mostly because it does not operate according to a predetermined outcome and instead treats The Symbolic as part of the unconscious. It functions therefore in relation to an anonymous symbolic order and not in terms of individual ego psychology.

The concept of subversive affirmation is often credited to the Slovenian philosopher Slavoj Žižek and his 1993 essay 'Why Are Laibach and the Neue Slowenische Kunst Not Fascists?' In his essay Žižek made use of the psychoanalysis of Jacques Lacan to argue that in its musical and artistic performance, Laibach, a band that makes use of totalitarian-style aesthetics, was not providing an ironic imitation of official communist state ideology, but was frustrating the system by over-identifying with its obscene superego underside and manipulating the process of transference with the totalitarian state. For subversive affirmation to be effective, its address must be anonymous rather than targeted. In contrast to film theories that give a specific gender identification to Lacan's notion of the gaze, subversive affirmation emphasizes the inconsistency of symbolic mandates and the fact that there is no Big Other. This is why Laibach avoid both irony as well as the category of art. They also deny that what they do is intended to be subversive.

Kostis Stafylakis argues that Athenian art group FYTA's work through radical ambivalence includes examples of subversive affirmation: in their work titled 'The One Hundred Worst Greeks' they include many that would be universally agreed to be bad along with controversial choices and famous composer Mikis Theodorakis.

Žižek's psychoanalytic approach to subversive affirmation and over-identification is applied to the study of the work of Michael Moore, IRWIN, The Yes Men, Atelier Van Lieshout, and Christoph Schlingensief in a book edited by the Dutch collective BAVO in 2007. In Brave New Avant Garde, Marc James Léger develops Žižek's theory in relation to Lacan's concept of the Sinthome and the Discourse of the Analyst (Four discourses), arguing that Social practice (art) can in some cases be understood in its connection to the Avant-garde. Subversive affirmation is not to be confused with transgression, parody, deception or masquerade. It does not emerge from a place of aggression or as what the French philosopher Michel Foucault defines as a counter-discourse. In this sense Léger compares over-identification to Lacan's Discourse of the Analyst, as opposed to the Discourse of the Master or the Discourse of the Hysteric.

In Surrealism, the use of conservative trappings, for example the illusionistic forms of representation in the paintings of René Magritte, or the Surrealists' bourgeois clothing and bureaucratic model of organization, could be thought of as antecedents to subversive affirmation. In an essay on the work of Hans Haacke, Fredric Jameson proposed that an art that acknowledges the logic of the image-world of late capitalism could be characterized as homeopathic, affirming the logic of the simulacrum to the point at which it is dialectically transformed into something else. Much like Jameson's notion of cognitive mapping, subversive affirmation and over-identification are best conceived in terms of a critical mapping of ideology.
